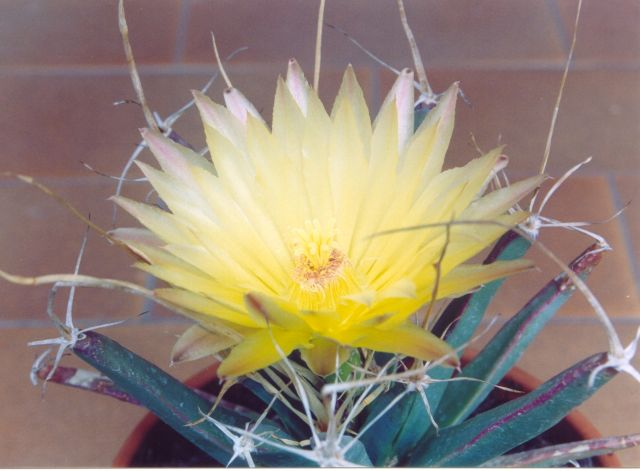
- Leuchtenbergia principis flower

Scientific classification
- Kingdom: Plantae
- Clade: Embryophytes
- Clade: Tracheophytes
- Clade: Angiosperms
- Clade: Eudicots
- Order: Caryophyllales
- Family: Cactaceae
- Subfamily: Cactoideae
- Tribe: Cacteae; Rchb.

Type genus
- Mammillaria

= Cacteae =

Tribe of plants

Cacteae is a tribe of plants of the family Cactaceae found mainly in North America especially Mexico. As of August 2018, the internal classification of the family Cactaceae remained uncertain and subject to change. A classification incorporating many of the insights from the molecular studies was produced by Nyffeler and Eggli in 2010. The main threats to cactus species are poaching, farming, mining developments, and climate change.

== Description ==
The spherical to short columnar plants grow individually or in cushions. Their size varies from dwarf (Turbinicarpus) to huge (Ferocactus). The non-segmented shoot axis is ribbed (Echinocactus), warty (Coryphantha) or ribbed-warty. The size and shape of the warts ranges from long and leafy (Leuchtenbergia) to broad with flat axillae (Turbinicarpus). The areoles are usually oval, ribbon-like, grooved, or dimorphic. The small to medium-sized, regular to rarely bilaterally symmetrical flowers appear below the crown and open during the day. The fruits are fleshy to juicy berry-like, with a scaly to glabrous pericarp. They are bursting to non-bursting or simply crumbling. The small to large seeds vary in shape and surface structure of the seed coat.

== Genera ==
The classification of cacti is in flux; the following list of genera is that from Nyffeler and Eggli (2010). with species updated from Plants of the World Online.

Image	Genus	Living species
	Acharagma (N.P.Taylor) Zimmerman ex Glass	Acharagma aguirreanum (Glass & R.A.Foster) Glass; Acharagma galeanense (Haugg) Lodé; Acharagma roseanum (Boed.) E.F.Anderson
	Ariocarpus Scheidw.	Ariocarpus agavoides (Castañeda) E.S.Anderson; Ariocarpus bravoanus H.M.Hern. & E.F.Anderson; Ariocarpus × drabi Halda & Sladk.; Ariocarpus fissuratus (Engelm.) K.Schum.; Ariocarpus kotschoubeyanus (Lem.) K.Schum.; Ariocarpus retusus Scheidw.; Ariocarpus scaphirostrus Boed.; Ariocarpus trigonus (F.A.C.Weber) K.Schum.
	Astrophytum Lem.	Astrophytum asterias (Zucc.) Lem.; Astrophytum capricorne (A.Dietr.) Britton & Rose; Astrophytum caput-medusae (Velazco & Nevárez) D.R.Hunt; Astrophytum coahuilense (H.Moeller) Kanfer; Astrophytum myriostigma Lem.; Astrophytum ornatum (DC.) Britton & Rose
	Aztekium Boed.	Aztekium hintonii Glass & W.A.Fitz Maur.; Aztekium ritteri (Boed.) Boed.
	Cochemiea (K.Brandegee) Walton	Cochemiea albicans (Britton & Rose) P.B.Breslin & Majure; Cochemiea angelensis (R.T.Craig) P.B.Breslin & Majure; Cochemiea armillata (K.Brandegee) P.B.Breslin & Majure; Cochemiea barbata (Engelm.) Doweld; Cochemiea blossfeldiana (Boed.) P.B.Breslin & Majure; Cochemiea boolii (G.E.Linds.) P.B.Breslin & Majure; Cochemiea bullardiana (H.E.Gates) P.B.Breslin & Majure; Cochemiea capensis (H.E.Gates) Doweld; Cochemiea cerralboa (Britton & Rose) P.B.Breslin & Majure; Cochemiea dioica (K.Brandegee) Doweld; Cochemiea estebanensis (G.E.Linds.) P.B.Breslin & Majure; Cochemiea fraileana (Britton & Rose) P.B.Breslin & Majure; Cochemiea goodridgei (Scheer ex Salm-Dyck) P.B.Breslin & Majure; Cochemiea grahamii (Engelm.) Doweld; Cochemiea guelzowiana (Werderm.) P.B.Breslin & Majure; Cochemiea halei (Brandegee) Walton; Cochemiea hutchisoniana (H.E.Gates) P.B.Breslin & Majure; Cochemiea insularis (H.E.Gates) P.B.Breslin & Majure; Cochemiea mainiae (K.Brandegee) P.B.Breslin & Majure; Cochemiea maritima G.E.Linds.; Cochemiea mazatlanensis (K.Schum.) D.Aquino & Dan.Sánchez; Cochemiea multidigitata (Radley ex G.E.Linds.) P.B.Breslin & Majure; Cochemiea palmeri (J.M.Coult.) P.B.Breslin & Majure; Cochemiea phitauiana (E.M.Baxter) Doweld; Cochemiea pondii (Greene) Walton; Cochemiea poselgeri (Hildm.) Britton & Rose; Cochemiea saboae (Glass) Doweld; Cochemiea schumannii (Hildm.) P.B.Breslin & Majure; Cochemiea setispina (J.M.Coult.) Walton; Cochemiea sheldonii (Britton & Rose) Doweld; Cochemiea tetrancistra (Engelm.) P.B.Breslin & Majure; Cochemiea theresae (Cutak) Doweld; Cochemiea thomasii García-Mor., Rodr.González, J.García-Jim. & Iamonico; Cochemiea thornberi (Orcutt) P.B.Breslin & Majure; Cochemiea viridiflora (Britton & Rose) P.B.Breslin & Majure; Cochemiea wrightii (Engelm.) Doweld
	Coryphantha (Engelm.) Lem.	Coryphantha clavata (Scheidw.) Backeb.; Coryphantha compacta (Engelm.) Orcutt; Coryphantha cornifera (DC.) Lem.; Coryphantha delaetiana (Quehl) A.Berger; Coryphantha delicata L.Bremer; Coryphantha difficilis (Quehl) Orcutt; Coryphantha durangensis (Runge ex K.Schum.) Britton & Rose; Coryphantha echinoidea (Quehl) Britton & Rose; Coryphantha echinus (Engelm.) Orcutt; Coryphantha elephantidens (Lem.) Lem.; Coryphantha erecta (Lem. ex Pfeiff.) Lem.; Coryphantha georgii Boed.; Coryphantha glanduligera (Otto & A.Dietr.) Lem.; Coryphantha glassii Dicht & A.Lüthy; Coryphantha gracilis L.Bremer & A.B.Lau; Coryphantha hintoniorum Dicht & A.Lüthy; Coryphantha ibarrana Matusz. & Šnicer; Coryphantha jalpanensis Franc.G.Buchenau; Coryphantha kracikii Halda, Chalupa & Kupčák; Coryphantha longicornis Boed.; Coryphantha maiz-tablasensis Fritz Schwarz; Coryphantha neglecta L.Bremer; Coryphantha nickelsiae (K.Brandegee) Britton & Rose; Coryphantha octacantha (DC.) Britton & Rose; Coryphantha ottonis (Pfeiff.) Lem.; Coryphantha pallida Britton & Rose; Coryphantha poselgeriana (A.Dietr.) Britton & Rose; Coryphantha potosiana (Jacobi) Glass & R.A.Foster ex Rowley; Coryphantha pseudechinus Boed.; Coryphantha pseudonickelsiae Backeb.; Coryphantha pulleineana (Backeb.) Glass; Coryphantha pycnacantha (Mart.) Lem.; Coryphantha ramillosa Cutak; Coryphantha recurvata (Engelm.) Britton & Rose; Coryphantha retusa (Pfeiff.) Britton & Rose; Coryphantha robustispina (A.Schott ex Engelm.) Britton & Rose; Coryphantha salinensis (Poselg.) Dicht & A.Lüthy; Coryphantha sulcata (Engelm.) Britton & Rose; Coryphantha tripugionacantha A.B.Lau; Coryphantha vaupeliana Boed.; Coryphantha vogtherriana Werderm. & Boed.; Coryphantha werdermannii Boed.; Coryphantha wohlschlageri Holzeis
	Echinocactus Link & Otto	Echinocactus × diabolicus (Halda, L.Vacek & Vaško) Janeba; Echinocactus horizonthalonius (Lem.; Echinocactus platyacanthus (Link & Otto
	Epithelantha F.A.C.Weber ex Britton & Rose	Epithelantha bokei L.D.Benson; Epithelantha cryptica D.Donati & Zanov.; Epithelantha greggii (Engelm.) Orcutt; Epithelantha ilariae D.Donati & Zanov.; Epithelantha micromeris (Engelm.) F.A.C.Weber ex Britton & Rose; Epithelantha pachyrhiza (W.T.Marshall) Backeb.; Epithelantha polycephala Backeb.; Epithelantha potosina (D.Donati & Zanov.) D.Aquino & S.Arias; Epithelantha pulchra (D.Donati & Zanov.) D.Aquino & S.Arias; Epithelantha spinosior C.Schmoll
	Ferocactus Britton & Rose	Ferocactus acanthodes (Lem.) Britton & Rose; Ferocactus alamosanus (Britton & Rose) Britton & Rose; Ferocactus chrysacanthus (Orcutt) Britton & Rose; Ferocactus diguetii (F.A.C.Weber) Britton & Rose; Ferocactus echidne (DC.) Britton & Rose; Ferocactus emoryi (Engelm.) Orcutt; Ferocactus flavovirens (Scheidw.) Britton & Rose; Ferocactus fordii (Orcutt) Britton & Rose; Ferocactus glaucescens (DC.) Britton & Rose; Ferocactus gracilis H.E.Gates; Ferocactus haematacanthus (Monv. ex Salm-Dyck) Bravo ex Backeb. & F.M.Knuth; Ferocactus hamatacanthus (Muehlenpf.) Britton & Rose; Ferocactus herrerae J.G.Ortega; Ferocactus histrix (DC.) G.E.Linds.; Ferocactus johnstonianus Britton & Rose; Ferocactus latispinus (Haw.) Britton & Rose; Ferocactus lindsayi Bravo; Ferocactus macrodiscus (Mart.) Britton & Rose; Ferocactus peninsulae (F.A.C.Weber) Britton & Rose; Ferocactus pilosus (Galeotti ex Salm-Dyck) Werderm.; Ferocactus pottsii (Salm-Dyck) Backeb.; Ferocactus robustus (Otto ex Pfeiff.) Britton & Rose; Ferocactus santa-maria Britton & Rose; Ferocactus schwarzii G.E.Linds.; Ferocactus tiburonensis (G.E.Linds.) Backeb.; Ferocactus townsendianus Britton & Rose; Ferocactus viridescens (Torr. & A.Gray) Britton & Rose; Ferocactus wislizeni (Engelm.) Britton & Rose
	Geohintonia Glass & W.A.Fitz Maur.	Geohintonia mexicana Glass & W.A.Fitz Maur.
	Glandulicactus Backeb.	Glandulicactus mathssonii (A.Berger ex K.Schum.) D.J.Ferguson; Glandulicactus uncinatus (Galeotti) Backeb.
	Homalocephala Britton & Rose	Homalocephala parryi (Engelm.) Vargas & Bárcenas; Homalocephala polycephala (Engelm. & J.M.Bigelow) Vargas & Bárcenas; Homalocephala texensis (Hopffer) Britton & Rose
	Kadenicarpus Doweld	Kadenicarpus heliae (García-Mor., Díaz-Salím & Gonz.-Bot.) D.Aquino; Kadenicarpus horripilus (Lem.) Vázquez-Sánchez; Kadenicarpus pseudomacrochele (Backeb.)
	Kroenleinia Lodé	Kroenleinia grusonii (Hildm.) Lodé
	Leuchtenbergia Hook.	Leuchtenbergia principis Fisch. ex Hook.
	Lophophora J.M.Coult.	Lophophora alberto-vojtechii Bohata, Myšák & Šnicer; Lophophora diffusa (Croizat) Bravo; Lophophora fricii Haberm.; Lophophora williamsii (Lem. ex J.F.Cels) J.M.Coult.
	Mammillaria Haw.	Mammillaria albicoma Boed.; Mammillaria albiflora (Werderm.) Backeb.; Mammillaria albilanata Backeb.; Mammillaria anniana Glass & R.A.Foster; Mammillaria ariasii U.Guzmán & D.Aquino; Mammillaria arreolae P.Carrillo & Ortiz-Brunel; Mammillaria aureilanata Backeb.; Mammillaria backebergiana Franc.G.Buchenau; Mammillaria baumii Boed.; Mammillaria beiselii Diers; Mammillaria bertholdii Linzen; Mammillaria bocasana Poselg.; Mammillaria bocensis R.T.Craig; Mammillaria boelderliana Wohlschl.; Mammillaria bombycina Quehl; Mammillaria brandegeei (J.M.Coult.) Engelm. ex K.Brandegee; Mammillaria carmeniae Castañeda; Mammillaria carnea Zucc. ex Pfeiff.; Mammillaria carretii Rebut ex K.Schum.; Mammillaria chionocephala J.A.Purpus; Mammillaria coahuilensis (Boed.) Moran; Mammillaria columbiana Salm-Dyck; Mammillaria compressa DC.; Mammillaria crinita DC.; Mammillaria crucigera Mart.; Mammillaria decipiens Scheidw.; Mammillaria deherdtiana Farwig; Mammillaria densispina (J.M.Coult.) Orcutt; Mammillaria discolor Haw.; Mammillaria dixanthocentron Backeb. ex Mottram; Mammillaria duoformis R.T.Craig & E.Y.Dawson; Mammillaria duwei Rogoz. & P.J.Braun; Mammillaria ekmanii Werderm.; Mammillaria elongata DC.; Mammillaria eriacantha Link & Otto ex Pfeiff.; Mammillaria erythrosperma Boed.; Mammillaria evermanniana (Britton & Rose) Orcutt; Mammillaria fittkaui Glass & R.A.Foster; Mammillaria flavicentra Backeb. ex Mottram; Mammillaria formosa Galeotti ex Scheidw.; Mammillaria × gajii Chvastek & Halda; Mammillaria gasseriana Boed.; Mammillaria geminispina Haw.; Mammillaria gigantea Hildm. ex K.Schum.; Mammillaria glassii R.A.Foster; Mammillaria glochidiata Mart.; Mammillaria grusonii Runge; Mammillaria guerreronis (Bravo) Boed.; Mammillaria haageana Pfeiff.; Mammillaria hahniana Werderm.; Mammillaria hernandezii Glass & R.A.Foster; Mammillaria herrerae Werderm.; Mammillaria heyderi Muehlenpf.; Mammillaria huitzilopochtli D.R.Hunt; Mammillaria humboldtii C.Ehrenb.; Mammillaria johnstonii (Britton & Rose) Orcutt; Mammillaria karwinskiana Mart.; Mammillaria klissingiana Boed.; Mammillaria knippeliana Quehl; Mammillaria kraehenbuehlii (Krainz) Krainz; Mammillaria lasiacantha Engelm.; Mammillaria laui D.R.Hunt; Mammillaria lenta K.Brandegee; Mammillaria limonensis Repp.; Mammillaria linaresensis R.Wolf & F.Wolf; Mammillaria longiflora (Britton & Rose) A.Berger; Mammillaria longimamma DC.; Mammillaria luethyi G.S.Hinton; Mammillaria magnifica Franc.G.Buchenau; Mammillaria magnimamma Haw.; Mammillaria mammillaris (L.) H.Karst.; Mammillaria manana W.A.Fitz Maur. & B.Fitz Maur.; Mammillaria marksiana Krainz; Mammillaria mathildae Kraehenb. & Krainz; Mammillaria matudae Bravo; Mammillaria meiacantha Engelm.; Mammillaria melaleuca Karw. ex Salm-Dyck; Mammillaria melanocentra Poselg.; Mammillaria mercadensis Patoni; Mammillaria meyranii Bravo; Mammillaria microhelia Werderm.; Mammillaria moelleriana Boed.; Mammillaria monochrysacantha Gonz.-Zam., D.Aquino & Dan.Sánchez; Mammillaria morentiniana Gonz.-Zam., D.Aquino, J.Mohl & Dan.Sánchez; Mammillaria muehlenpfordtii C.F.Först.; Mammillaria multihamata Boed.; Mammillaria mystax Mart.; Mammillaria nana Backeb.; Mammillaria napina J.A.Purpus; Mammillaria nivosa Link ex Pfeiff.; Mammillaria nunezii (Britton & Rose) Orcutt; Mammillaria occulta Zamudio & U.Guzmán; Mammillaria orcuttii Boed.; Mammillaria oteroi Glass & R.A.Foster; Mammillaria parkinsonii C.Ehrenb.; Mammillaria pectinifera F.A.C.Weber; Mammillaria peninsularis (Britton & Rose) Orcutt; Mammillaria pennispinosa Krainz; Mammillaria perbella Hildm. ex K.Schum.; Mammillaria perezdelarosae Bravo & Scheinvar; Mammillaria petrophila K.Brandegee; Mammillaria petterssonii Hildm.; Mammillaria picta Meinsh.; Mammillaria pilispina J.A.Purpus; Mammillaria plumosa F.A.C.Weber; Mammillaria polyedra Mart.; Mammillaria polythele Mart.; Mammillaria pottsii Scheer ex Salm-Dyck; Mammillaria pringlei (J.M.Coult.) K.Brandegee; Mammillaria prolifera (Mill.) Haw.; Mammillaria rekoi (Britton & Rose) Vaupel; Mammillaria rhodantha Link & Otto; Mammillaria roseoalba Boed.; Mammillaria rzedowskiana Zamudio & U.Guzmán; Mammillaria sanchez-mejoradae Rodr.González; Mammillaria sartorii J.A.Purpus; Mammillaria scheinvariana R.Ortega V. & Glass; Mammillaria schiedeana C.Ehrenb.; Mammillaria schwarzii Shurly; Mammillaria scrippsiana (Britton & Rose) Orcutt; Mammillaria sempervivi DC.; Mammillaria senilis Lodd. ex Salm-Dyck; Mammillaria sinistrohamata Boed.; Mammillaria solisioides Backeb.; Mammillaria sonorensis R.T.Craig; Mammillaria sphaerica A.Dietr.; Mammillaria spinosissima Lem.; Mammillaria standleyi (Britton & Rose) Orcutt; Mammillaria supertexta Mart. ex Pfeiff.; Mammillaria surculosa Boed.; Mammillaria tayloriorum Glass & R.A.Foster; Mammillaria tepexicensis J.Meyrán; Mammillaria uncinata Zucc. ex Pfeiff.; Mammillaria varieaculeata Franc.G.Buchenau; Mammillaria vetula Mart.; Mammillaria voburnensis Scheer; Mammillaria wagneriana Boed.; Mammillaria weingartiana Boed.; Mammillaria wiesingeri Boed.; Mammillaria winterae Boed.; Mammillaria xaltianguensis Sánchez-Mej.; Mammillaria zeilmanniana Boed.; Mammillaria zephyranthoides Scheidw.; Mammillaria zublerae Repp.
	Neolloydia Britton & Rose	Neolloydia conoidea (DC.) Britton & Rose; Neolloydia inexpectata D.Donati; Neolloydia matehualensis Backeb.
	Obregonia Fric	Obregonia denegrii Fric
	Ortegocactus Alexander	Ortegocactus macdougallii Alexander
	PediocactusBritton & Rose	Pediocactus bradyi L.D.Benson; Pediocactus despainii S.L.Welsh & Goodrich; Pediocactus hajekii Hochstätter; Pediocactus indranus (Hochstätter) Hochstätter; Pediocactus knowltonii L.D.Benson; Pediocactus nigrispinus (Hochstätter) Hochstätter; Pediocactus paradinei B.W.Benson; Pediocactus peeblesianus (Croizat) L.D.Benson; Pediocactus sileri (Daul) L.D.Benson; Pediocactus simpsonii (Engelm.) Britton & Rose; Pediocactus winkleri K.D.Heil
	Pelecyphora C.Ehrenb.	Pelecyphora abdita (Řepka & Vaško) D.Aquino & Dan.Sánchez; Pelecyphora alversonii (J.M.Coult.) D.Aquino & Dan.Sánchez; Pelecyphora aselliformis C.Ehrenb.; Pelecyphora chihuahuensis (Britton & Rose) D.Aquino & Dan.Sánchez; Pelecyphora chlorantha (Engelm.) Stock; Pelecyphora cubensis (Britton & Rose) D.Aquino & Dan.Sánchez; Pelecyphora dasyacantha (Engelm.) D.Aquino & Dan.Sánchez; Pelecyphora duncanii (Hester) D.Aquino & Dan.Sánchez; Pelecyphora emskoetteriana (Quehl) D.Aquino & Dan.Sánchez; Pelecyphora hesteri (Y.Wright) D.Aquino & Dan.Sánchez; Pelecyphora laredoi (Glass & R.A.Foster) D.Aquino & Dan.Sánchez; Pelecyphora lloydii (Britton & Rose) D.Aquino & Dan.Sánchez; Pelecyphora macromeris (Engelm.) D.Aquino & Dan.Sánchez; Pelecyphora minima (Baird) D.Aquino & Dan.Sánchez; Pelecyphora missouriensis (Sweet) D.Aquino & Dan.Sánchez; Pelecyphora robbinsiorum (W.H.Earle) D.Aquino & Dan.Sánchez; Pelecyphora sneedii (Britton & Rose) D.Aquino & Dan.Sánchez; Pelecyphora strobiliformis (Werderm.) Frič & Schelle ex Kreuz.; Pelecyphora tuberculosa (Engelm.) D.Aquino & Dan.Sánchez; Pelecyphora vivipara (Nutt.) D.Aquino & Dan.Sánchez; Pelecyphora zilziana (Boed.) D.Aquino & Dan.Sánchez
	Rapicactus Buxb. & Oehme)	Rapicactus beguinii (N.P.Taylor) Lüthy; Rapicactus booleanus (G.S.Hinton) D.Donati; Rapicactus mandragora (Frič ex A.Berger) Buxb. & Oehme; Rapicactus subterraneus (Backeb.) Buxb. & Oehme; Rapicactus zaragosae (Glass & R.A.Foster) D.Donati
	Sclerocactus Britton & Rose	Sclerocactus blainei S.L.Welsh & K.H.Thorne; Sclerocactus brevihamatus (Engelm.) D.R.Hunt; Sclerocactus brevispinus K.D.Heil & J.M.Porter; Sclerocactus cloverae K.D.Heil & J.M.Porter; Sclerocactus dawsoniae McGlaughlin & Naibauer; Sclerocactus glaucus (K.Schum.) L.D.Benson; Sclerocactus hispidus (D.Donati & Zanov.) Lodé; Sclerocactus intertextus (Engelm.) N.P.Taylor; Sclerocactus johnsonii (Parry ex Engelm.) N.P.Taylor; Sclerocactus mariposensis (Hester) N.P.Taylor; Sclerocactus megarrhizus (Rose) Lodé; Sclerocactus mesae-verdae (Boissev. & C.Davidson) L.D.Benson; Sclerocactus nyensis Hochstätter; Sclerocactus papyracanthus (Engelm.) N.P.Taylor; Sclerocactus parviflorus Clover & Jotter; Sclerocactus pinkavanus (García-Mor., Gonz.-Bot. & Rodr.González) M.H.J.van der Meer; Sclerocactus polyancistrus (Engelm. & J.M.Bigelow) Britton & Rose; Sclerocactus pubispinus (Engelm.) L.D.Benson; Sclerocactus scheeri (Salm-Dyck) N.P.Taylor; Sclerocactus sileri (L.D.Benson) K.D.Heil & J.M.Porter; Sclerocactus spinosior (Engelm.) D.Woodruff & L.D.Benson; Sclerocactus tobuschii (W.T.Marshall) Lodé; Sclerocactus unguispinus (Engelm.) N.P.Taylor; Sclerocactus warnockii (L.D.Benson) N.P.Taylor; Sclerocactus wetlandicus Hochstätter; Sclerocactus whipplei (Engelm. & J.M.Bigelow) Britton & Rose; Sclerocactus wrightiae L.D.Benson
	Stenocactus (K.Schum.) A.Berger	Stenocactus boedekerianus A.Berger; Stenocactus coptonogonus (Lem.) A.Berger; Stenocactus crispatus (DC.) A.Berger; Stenocactus × irregularis Gonz.-Zam., D.Aquino & Dan.Sánchez; Stenocactus multicostatus (Daul) A.Berger; Stenocactus obvallatus (DC.) A.Berger; Stenocactus ochoterenianus Tiegel; Stenocactus phyllacanthus (A.Dietr.) A.Berger; Stenocactus sulphureus (A.Dietr.) Bravo; Stenocactus vaupelianus (Werderm.) F.M.Knuth
	Strombocactus Britton & Rose	Strombocactus corregidorae S.Arias & E.Sánchez; Strombocactus disciformis (DC.) Britton & Rose
	Thelocactus (K.Schum.) Britton & Rose	Thelocactus bicolor (Galeotti ex Pfeiff.) Britton & Rose; Thelocactus buekii (E.Klein bis) Britton & Rose; Thelocactus conothelos (Regel & E.Klein bis) F.M.Knuth; Thelocactus hastifer (Werderm. & Boed.) F.M.Knuth; Thelocactus hexaedrophorus (Lem.) Britton & Rose; Thelocactus lausseri Říha & Busek; Thelocactus leucacanthus (Zucc. ex Pfeiff.) Britton & Rose; Thelocactus macdowellii (Rebut ex Quehl) W.T.Marshall; Thelocactus × mirandus Halda & Panar.; Thelocactus multicephalus Halda & Panar.; Thelocactus rinconensis (Poselg.) Britton & Rose; Thelocactus setispinus (Engelm.) E.F.Anderson; Thelocactus tepelmemensis T.J.Davis, H.M.Hern., G.D.Starr & Gómez-Hin.; Thelocactus tulensis (Poselg.) Britton & Rose
	Turbinicarpus (Backeb.) Buxb. & Backeb.	Turbinicarpus alonsoi Glass & S.Arias; Turbinicarpus × amoenulus Halda & Panar.; Turbinicarpus boedekerianus García-Mor., Gonz.-Bot., Matusz., Nitzschke & Iamonico; Turbinicarpus gielsdorfianus (Werderm.) V.John & Říha; Turbinicarpus graminispinus Matusz., Myšák & Jiruše; Turbinicarpus hoferi Lüthy & A.B.Lau; Turbinicarpus laui Glass & R.A.Foster; Turbinicarpus lophophoroides (Werderm.) Buxb. & Backeb.; Turbinicarpus × mombergeri Říha; Turbinicarpus nikolae Šnicer, Myšák, Zachar & Jiruše; Turbinicarpus pseudopectinatus (Backeb.) Glass & R.A.Foster; Turbinicarpus × roseiflorus Backeb.; Turbinicarpus saueri (Boed.) V.John & Říha; Turbinicarpus schmiedickeanus (Boed.) Buxb. & Backeb.; Turbinicarpus swobodae Diers; Turbinicarpus valdezianus (H.Moeller) Glass & R.A.Foster; Turbinicarpus viereckii (Werderm.) V.John & Říha

The type genus is Mammillaria.
