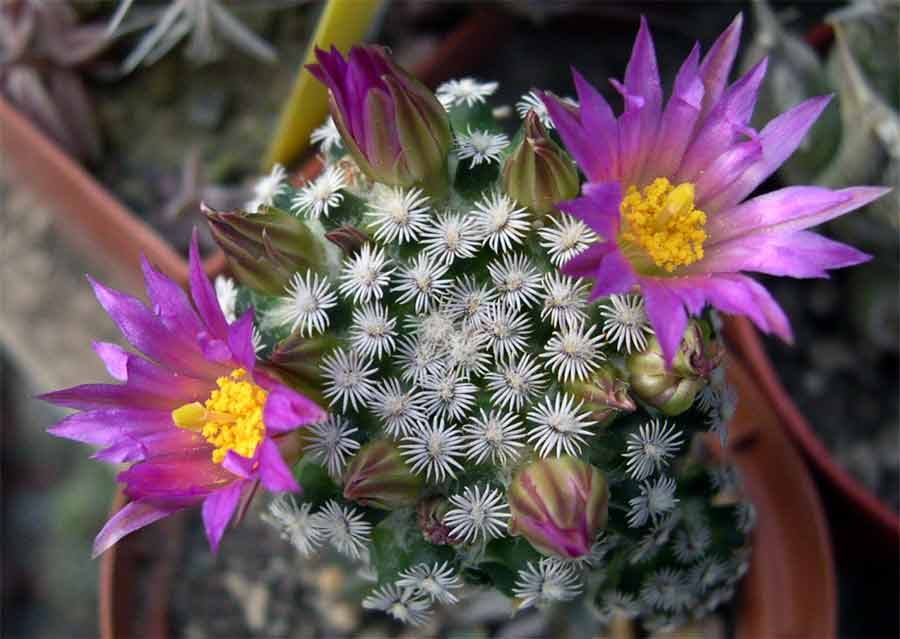

Conservation status
- Endangered (IUCN 3.1)

Scientific classification
- Kingdom: Plantae
- Clade: Tracheophytes
- Clade: Angiosperms
- Clade: Eudicots
- Order: Caryophyllales
- Family: Cactaceae
- Subfamily: Cactoideae
- Genus: Mammillaria
- Species: M. hernandezii

Binomial name
- Mammillaria hernandezii Glass & R.A.Foster

= Mammillaria hernandezii =

Species of cactus

Mammillaria hernandezii is a species of cacti in the tribe Cacteae. It is native to Mexico where it has a disjointed distribution in a small area of upland tropical pine scrub. There are estimated to be fewer than 500 plants in the wild and is classified as endangered.
