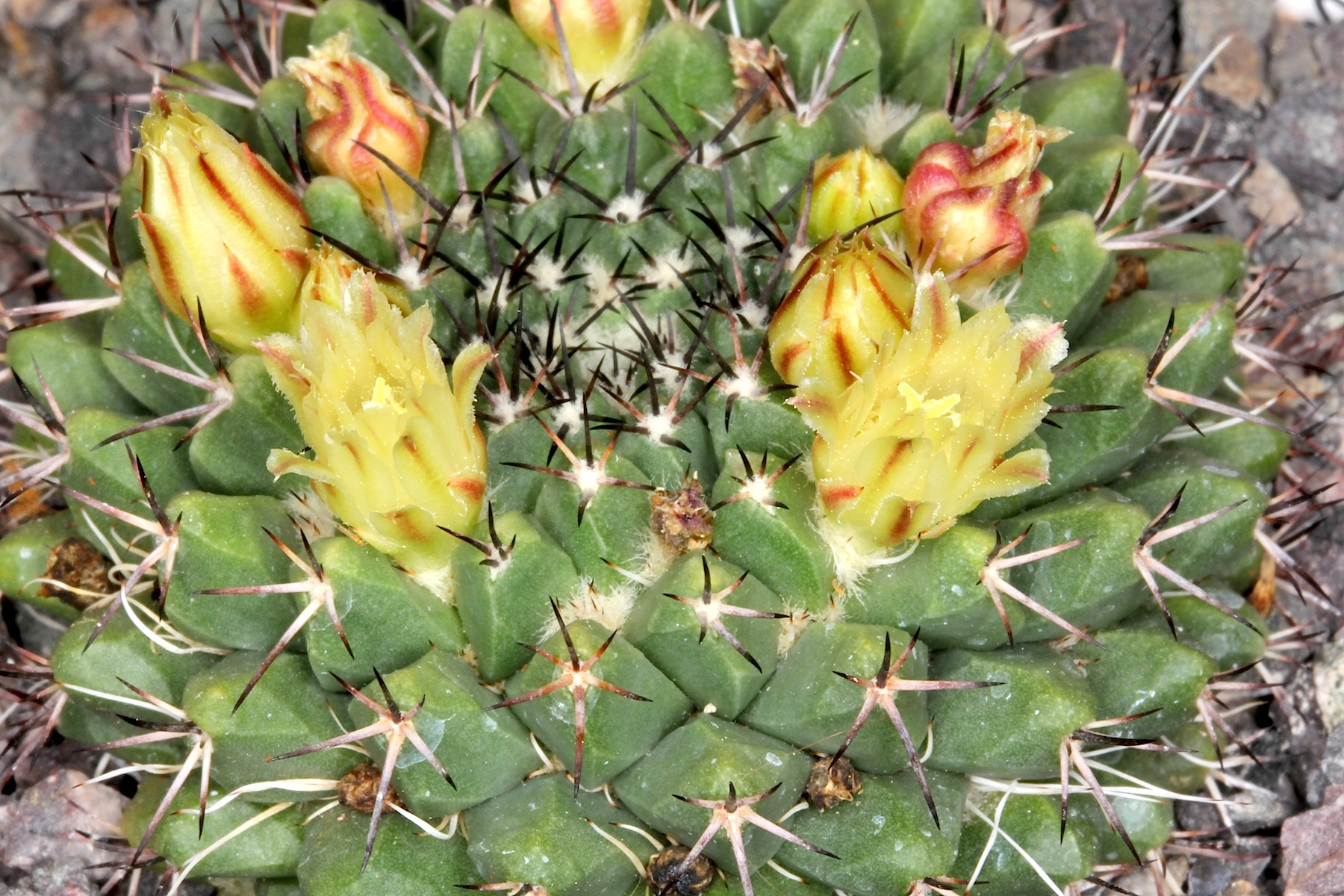
- Mammillaria karwinskiana subsp. karwinskiana

Conservation status
- Least Concern (IUCN 3.1)

Scientific classification
- Kingdom: Plantae
- Clade: Tracheophytes
- Clade: Angiosperms
- Clade: Eudicots
- Order: Caryophyllales
- Family: Cactaceae
- Subfamily: Cactoideae
- Genus: Mammillaria
- Species: M. karwinskiana

Binomial name
- Mammillaria karwinskiana Mart.

Subspecies
- M. k. beiselii M. k. collinsii M. k. karwinskiana M. k. nejapensis

Synonyms
- Mammillaria woburnensis Scheer; Mammillaria voburnensis subsp. voburnensis Scheer; Mammillaria voburnensis Scheer; Mammillaria strobilina Tiegel; Mammillaria ebenacantha Shurly

= Mammillaria karwinskiana =

Species of cactus

Mammillaria karwinskiana is a species of cacti in the tribe Cacteae. It is native to Mexico.

== Gallery ==
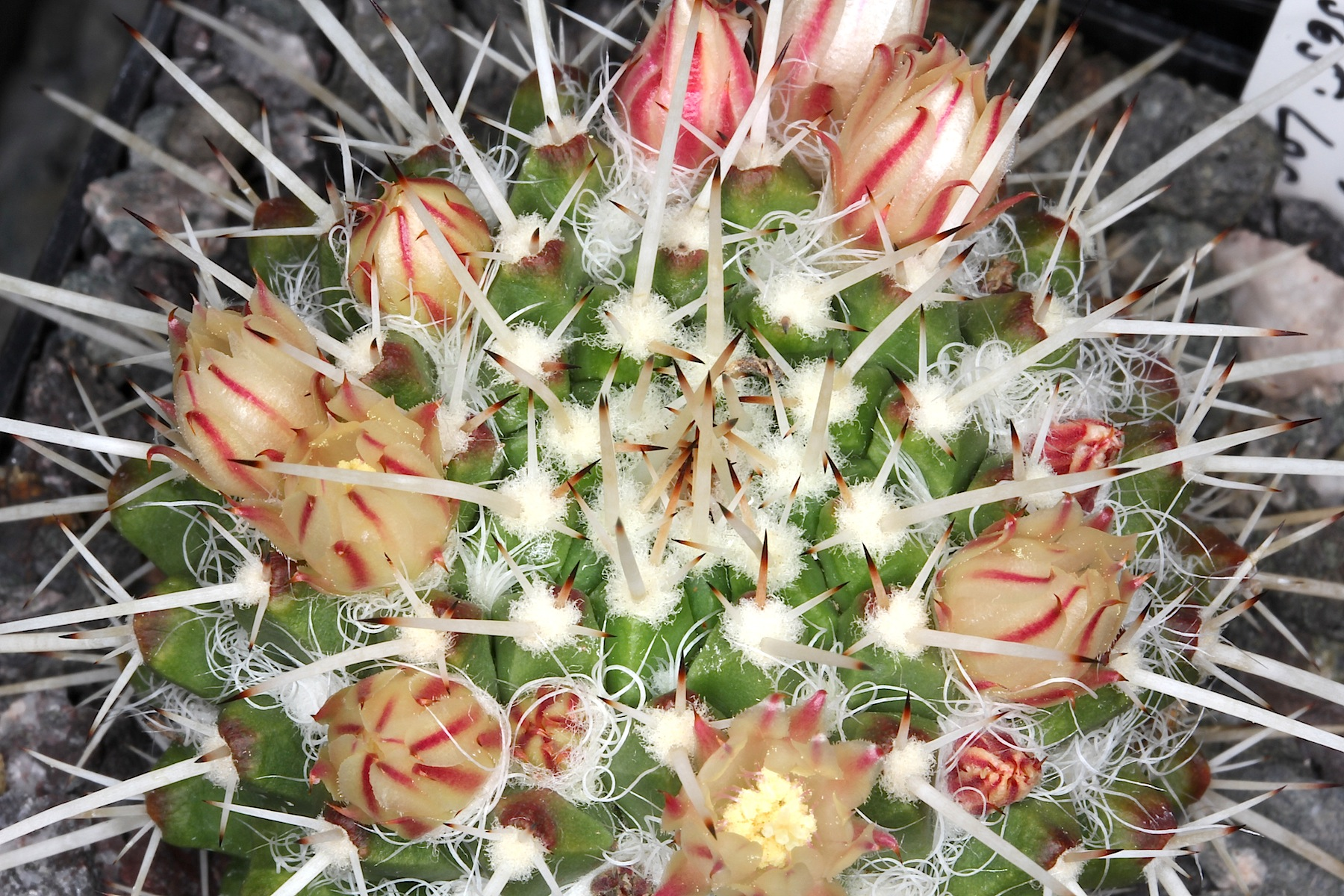

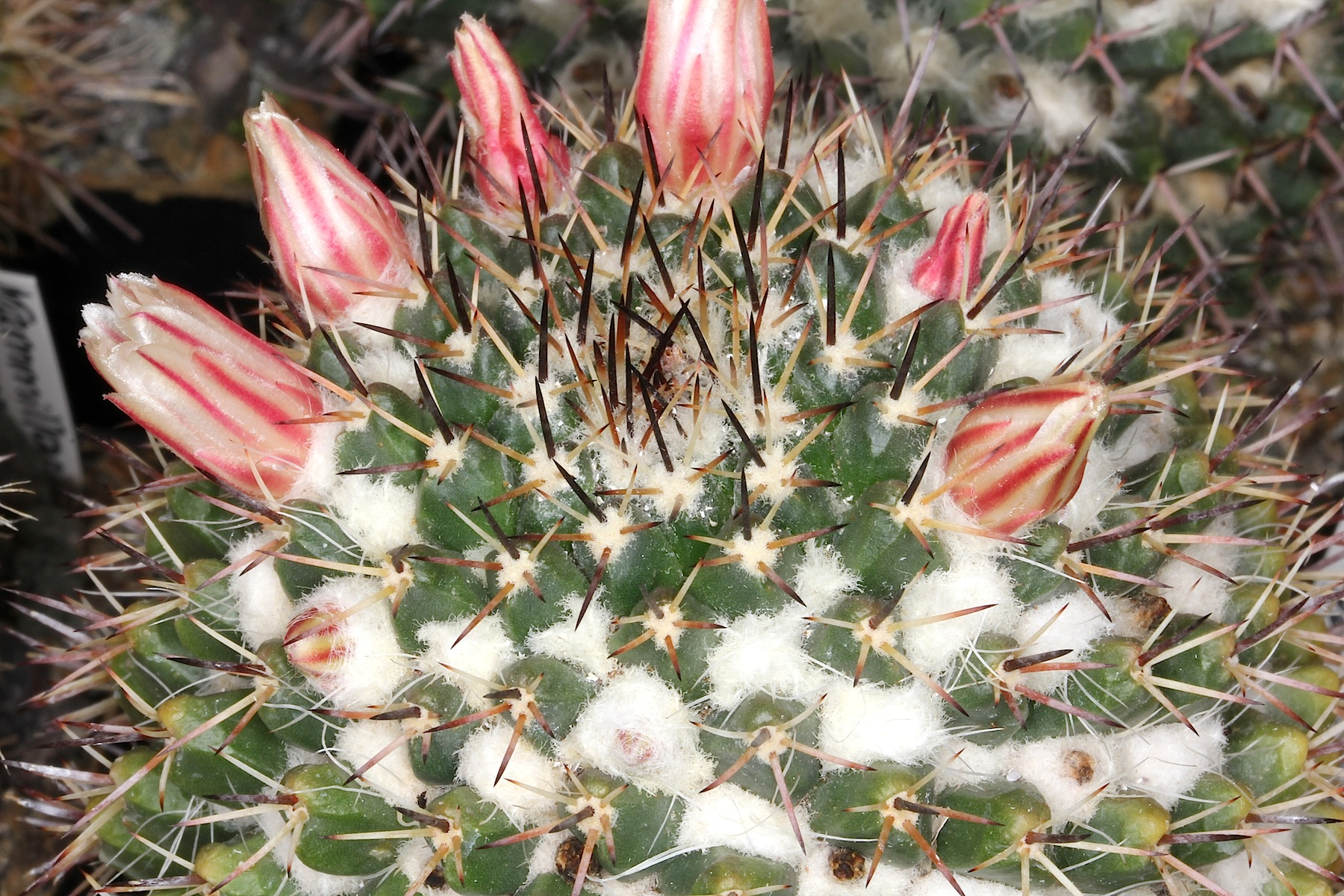

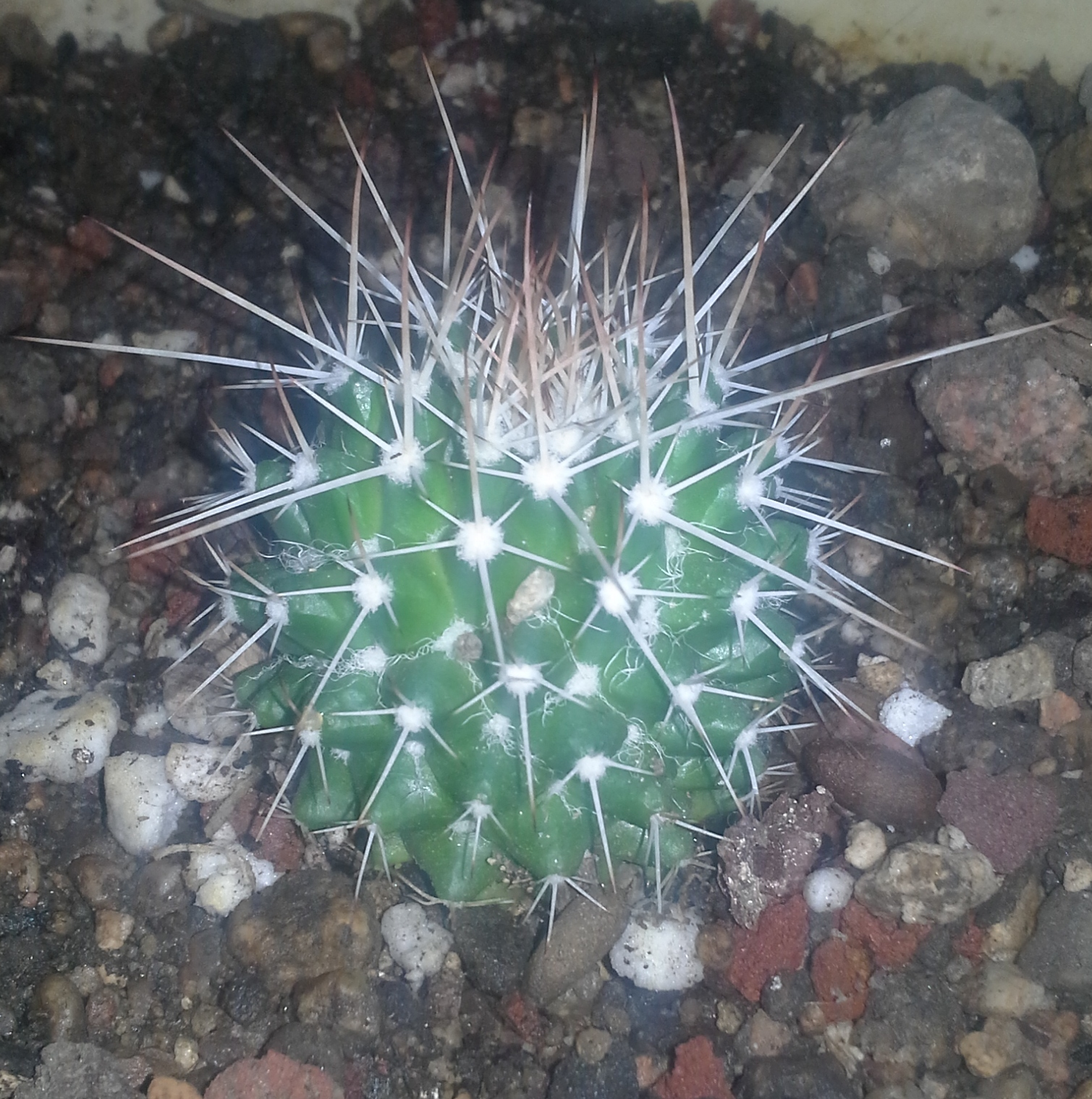

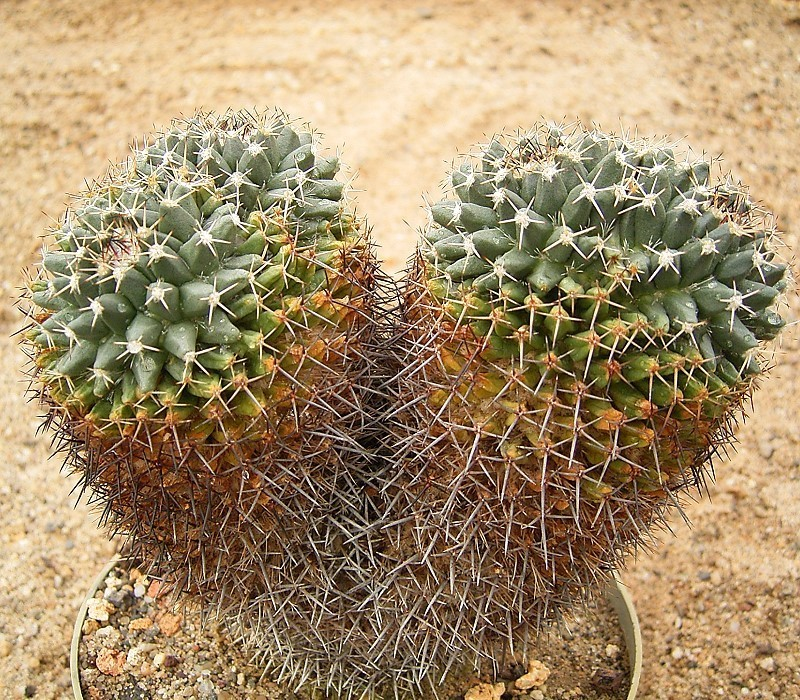
