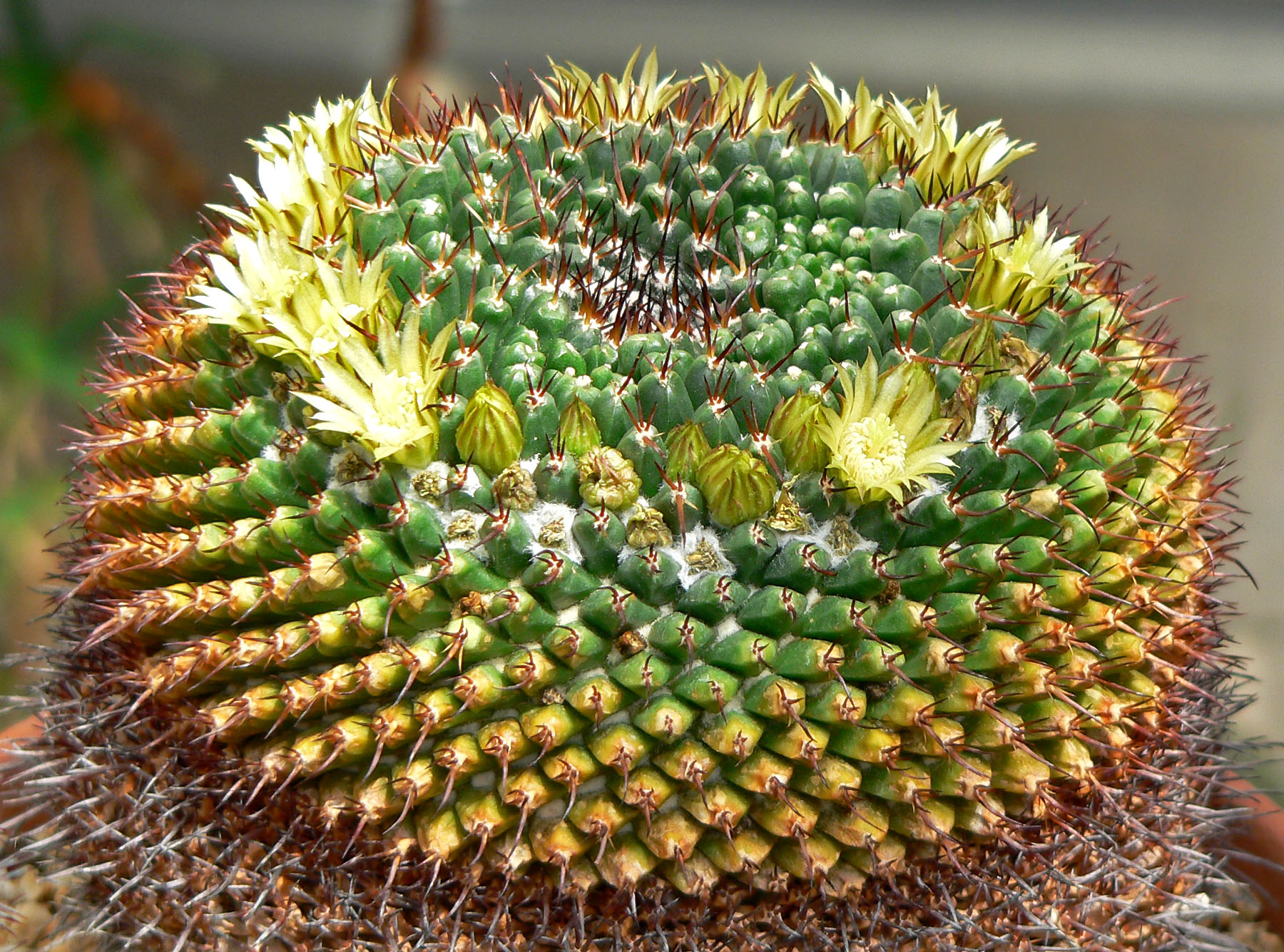

Conservation status
- Data Deficient (IUCN 3.1)

Scientific classification
- Kingdom: Plantae
- Clade: Tracheophytes
- Clade: Angiosperms
- Clade: Eudicots
- Order: Caryophyllales
- Family: Cactaceae
- Subfamily: Cactoideae
- Genus: Mammillaria
- Species: M. gigantea

Binomial name
- Mammillaria gigantea Hildm ex K.Schum, 1898

Synonyms
- Neomammillaria gigantea (Hildm. ex K.Schum.) Britton & Rose 1923; Mammillaria armatissima R.T.Craig 1945; Mammillaria flavovirens Salm-Dyck 1850; Mammillaria flavovirens var. cristata {{{1}}}; Mammillaria flavovirens f. cristata (Salm-Dyck) Schelle 1907; Mammillaria gigantea subsp. flavovirens Rogoz. & Plein 2003; Mammillaria gigantea subsp. hamiltonhoytiae (Bravo) Rogoz. & Plein 2003; Mammillaria guanajuatensis Rudge ex K.Schum. 1898; Mammillaria hamiltonhoytiae (Bravo) Werderm. 1931; Mammillaria hamiltonhoytiae var. fulvaflora R.T.Craig 1945; Mammillaria hamiltonhoytiae var. pilensis (Shurly) Repp. 1987; Mammillaria hastifera Krainz & A.Keller 1946; Mammillaria macdowellii K.Schum. 1898; Mammillaria ocotillensis R.T.Craig 1945; Mammillaria ocotillensis var. brevispina R.T.Craig 1945; Mammillaria ocotillensis var. longispina R.T.Craig 1945; Mammillaria pilensis Shurly 1961; Mammillaria pilensis Shurly ex Eggli 1985; Mammillaria saint-pieana Backeb. 1963; Neomammillaria flavovirens (Salm-Dyck) Britton & Rose 1923; Neomammillaria hamiltonhoytiae Bravo 1931; Neomammillaria pilensis (Shurly) Y.Itô 1981

= Mammillaria gigantea =

Species of cactus

Mammillaria gigantea is a species of cactus in the subfamily Cactoideae native to Mexico. It is named for its large size.

== Description ==
Mammillaria gigantea is a cactus that grows low and almost cake-shaped, often slightly sunken at the top, and covered in white wool felt. Its blue-green body is 9 to 10 cm (3.5 to 3.9 in) high and 15 to 17 cm (5.9 to 6.7 in) in diameter, with densely packed warts that produce milky juice. The axillae are covered with white wool. It has up to 12 small, fine-needle, straight white radial spines, each up to 3 mm (0.12 in) long, and 4 to 6 strong, usually curved central spines, with the lowest one reaching up to 2 cm (0.79 in). New central spines are yellow-brown with dark tips, later becoming yellowish, white to horn-colored, and reddish at the base.

As with all Mammillaria, the flowers appear in a wreath. They are green-yellow and about 15 mm (0.59 in) in diameter. The fruits are pink to greenish, and the seeds are brown.

== Distribution ==
Mammillaria gigantea is found in the mountainous regions of the Mexican states of Guanajuato, Durango, San Luis Potosí, and Querétaro, at altitudes between 1,750 and 2,400 m (5,740 and 7,870 ft).

== Taxonomy ==
It was first described in 1898 by Karl Moritz Schumann. The specific epithet "gigantea" comes from Latin and means "enormously large," referring to the plant's size.
