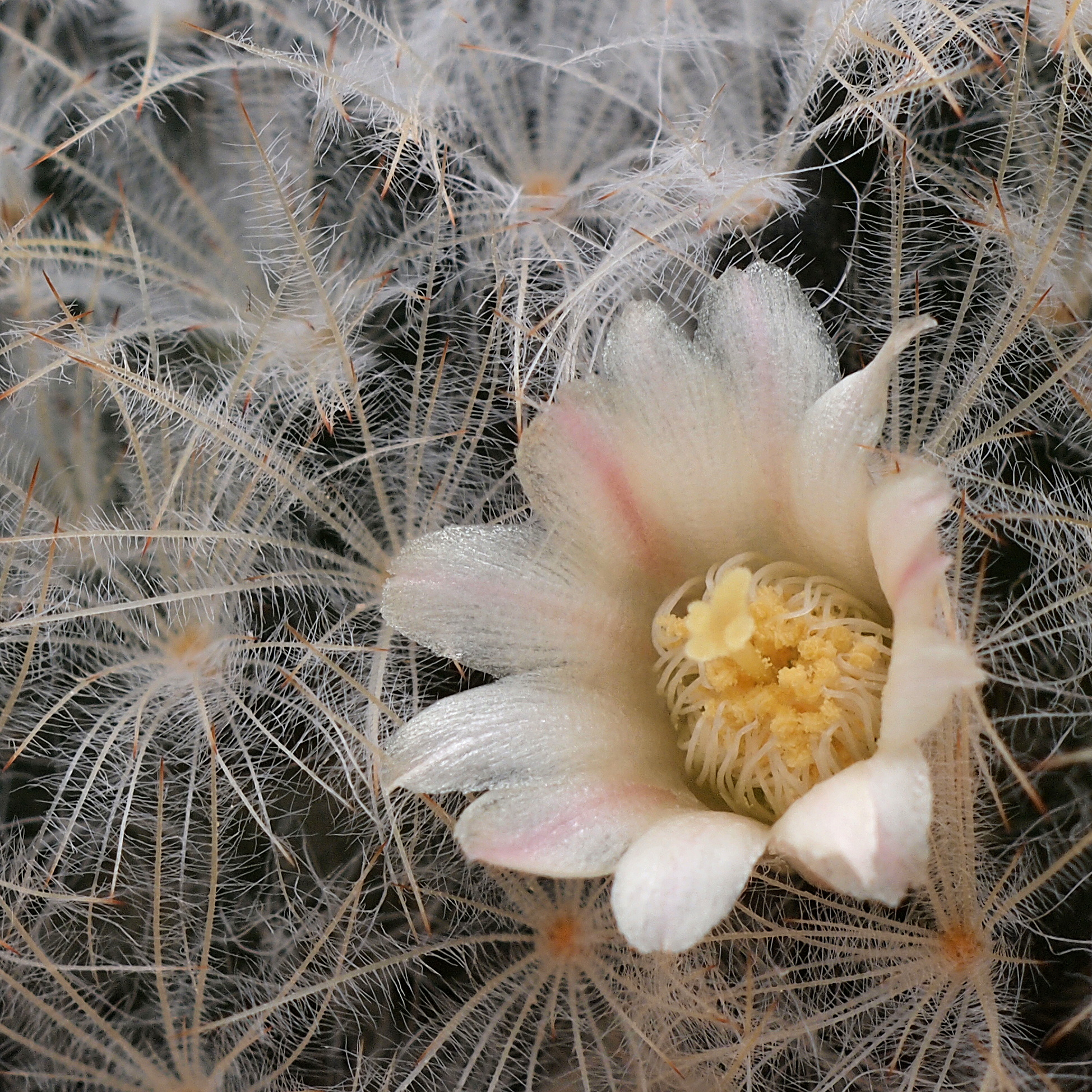

Conservation status
- Near Threatened (IUCN 3.1)

Scientific classification
- Kingdom: Plantae
- Clade: Tracheophytes
- Clade: Angiosperms
- Clade: Eudicots
- Order: Caryophyllales
- Family: Cactaceae
- Subfamily: Cactoideae
- Genus: Mammillaria
- Species: M. plumosa

Binomial name
- Mammillaria plumosa F.A.C.Weber

= Mammillaria plumosa =

Species of cactus

Mammillaria plumosa, the feather cactus, is a species of flowering plant in the family Cactaceae, native to Northeastern Mexico.

It grows to 12 cm (5 in) tall by 40 cm (16 in) broad. The clustering spherical stems, 7 cm (3 in) in diameter, are completely covered in white downy spines. The spines are adorned with very long hairs that are arranged like the segments of a bird's feather and protect the plant against the blistering sun of the desert. White or greenish yellow flowers are borne in late summer.

Its status is listed as "Near Threatened" by the IUCN Red List.

== Cultivation ==
Mammillaria plumosa is one of several Mammillaria species to be cultivated. In temperate regions it must be grown under glass with heat. It has gained the Royal Horticultural Society's Award of Garden Merit.
