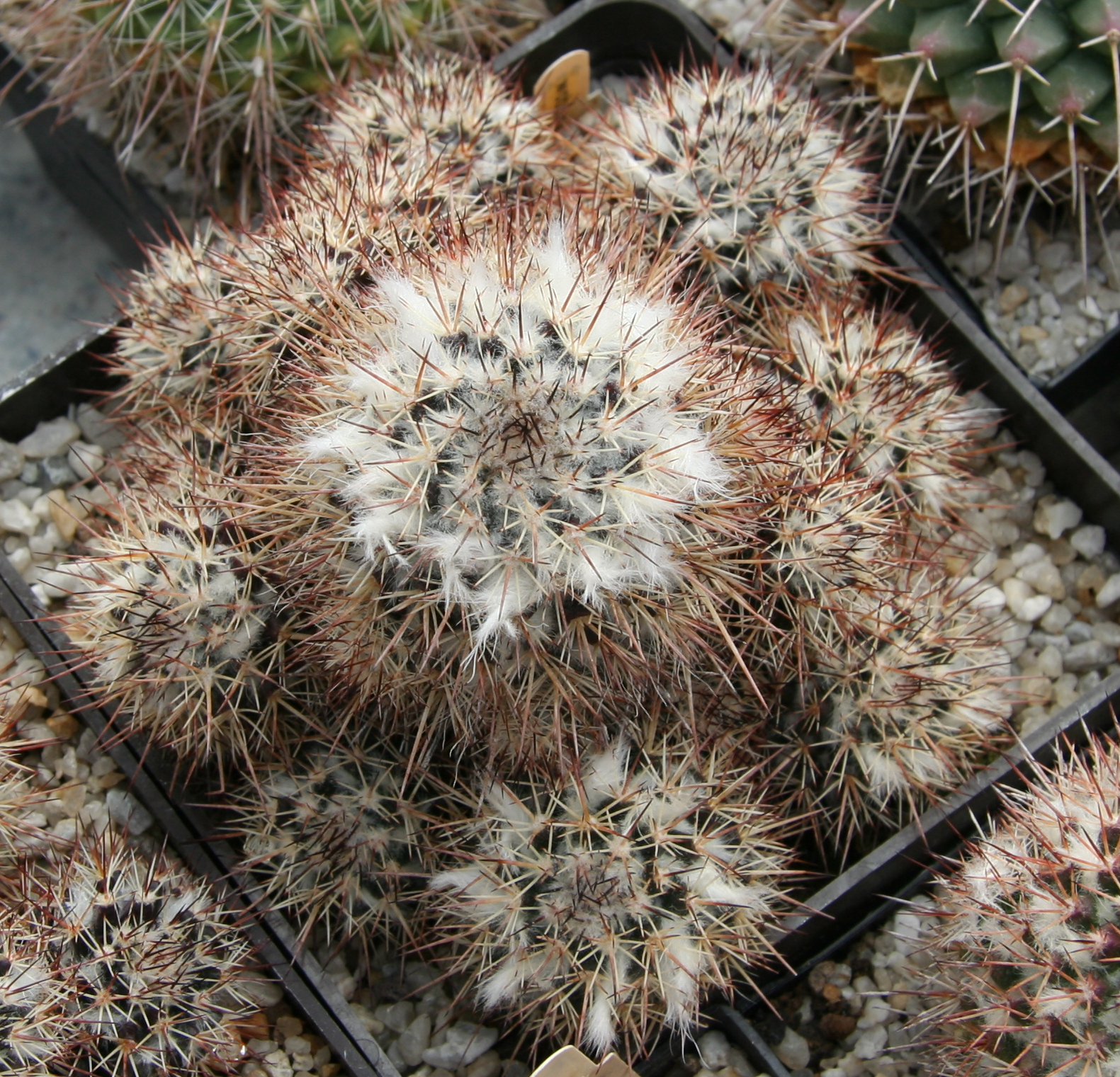
- Mammillaria voburnensis in cultivation

Scientific classification
- Kingdom: Plantae
- Clade: Tracheophytes
- Clade: Angiosperms
- Clade: Eudicots
- Order: Caryophyllales
- Family: Cactaceae
- Subfamily: Cactoideae
- Genus: Mammillaria
- Species: M. voburnensis

Binomial name
- Mammillaria voburnensis Scheer (1845)

Synonyms
- Cactus voburnensis (Scheer) Kuntze; Mammillaria chapinensis Schelle; Neomammillaria voburnensis (Scheer) Britton & Rose

= Mammillaria voburnensis =

Species of cactus

Mammillaria voburnensis is a species of flowering plant in the cactus family Cactaceae. It is a freely clustering or solitary cactus native to southern Mexico, Guatemala, Honduras, and Nicaragua. The species is well known in cultivation as an ornamental plant due to its attractive spines, yellowish-red flowers, and relatively easy care requirements.

== Taxonomy ==
The species was first described by the botanist Frederick Scheer in 1845 in the London Journal of Botany. The specific epithet voburnensis refers to Woburn Abbey in Bedfordshire, England, where the type specimen was cultivated.

The species has a somewhat convoluted taxonomic history. It was reclassified as Cactus voburnensis by Carl Ernst Otto Kuntze in 1891, and later as Neomammillaria voburnensis by Nathaniel Lord Britton and Joseph Nelson Rose in 1923. Some authorities have considered it a synonym of Mammillaria karwinskiana. However, it is currently accepted as a distinct species by Plants of the World Online (POWO) and other taxonomic sources.

The name is sometimes misspelled as "Mammillaria woburnensis".

=== Infraspecific taxa ===
Several subspecies and varieties have been described, although their taxonomic status is subject to debate. Recognized infraspecific taxa include:

- Mammillaria voburnensis subsp. collinsii (Britton & Rose) U.Guzmán
- Mammillaria voburnensis subsp. eichlamii (Quehl) D.R.Hunt
- Mammillaria voburnensis subsp. voburnensis (autonym)

Some of these taxa are treated as synonyms of the main species by some authorities, while others recognize them as distinct.

== Description ==
Mammillaria voburnensis is a small cactus that can be either solitary or clump-forming, eventually forming large mounds up to 30 cm (12 in) high and wide, sometimes comprising 25 or more individual stems. The stems are cylindrical, sometimes only globose when young, measuring 5 to 15 cm (2.0 to 5.9 in) in height and about 3 cm (1.2 in) in diameter (often larger in cultivation). The stem color ranges from yellowish-green to dull green, often with a reddish tinge, and it exudes a copious milky sap when injured.

The tubercles are small, sub-ovoidal, and arranged in 8 to 13 spirals. The axils (the spaces between tubercles) are densely filled with silky white or yellowish wool and long, white bristles.

The areoles bear spines of two types:

- Radial spines: 5 to 9 in number, measuring approximately 4 mm long, are white or yellowish, irregularly spreading, and often recurved.
- Central spines: 1 or rarely 2, are subulate (awl-shaped), rigid, and upright, measuring about 12 mm long. They are initially brown, brownish-red, or yellow, later becoming ivory-brown.

The flowers are small, about 2 cm long, and appear in spring and summer. They are yellowish with a reddish central stripe or reddish-yellow. The fruit is club-shaped, red, and measures 18 to 25 mm in length.

== Distribution and habitat ==
The species is native to southern Mexico (the states of Chiapas and Oaxaca), Guatemala, Honduras, and Nicaragua. It grows at altitudes ranging from sea level to 800 meters.

Its natural habitat is primarily in the seasonally dry tropical biome, where it grows in rocky gravel, sandy, and stony soils, often in cloud forests and dry forests. It is a lithophyte, growing on rocky substrates, and can also be found in association with other cactus species such as Opuntia decumbens and Stenocereus pruinosus.

== Cultivation ==
Mammillaria voburnensis is widely cultivated as an ornamental plant for its attractive form and abundant flowering. It is considered relatively easy to grow, making it suitable for beginners.

=== Growing conditions ===
- Light: It requires as much light as possible to maintain compact growth, but should be protected from intense direct sunlight that can scorch the plant. A south-facing window is ideal for indoor cultivation.
- Soil: A well-drained cactus or succulent potting mix is essential. A mix containing 70-80% mineral grit, such as coarse sand, pumice, or perlite, is recommended.
- Watering: During the active growing season (spring and summer), the plant should be watered thoroughly, allowing the soil to dry out completely between waterings. In winter, watering should be suspended or greatly reduced to prevent root rot.
- Temperature: The species prefers warm conditions and is not frost-hardy. It is recommended for USDA hardiness zones 9a to 11b. It can tolerate brief exposures to light freezing temperatures if kept dry and properly hardened off, but temperatures below -4 °C may cause damage.

=== Propagation ===
The species is best propagated from seeds, which germinate readily at temperatures of 20–22 °C. Offsets, if produced, can also be removed and rooted.

=== Pests and diseases ===
Like many cacti, Mammillaria voburnensis is susceptible to root rot if overwatered or grown in poorly draining soil. It may also be affected by common pests such as mealybugs and spider mites.

== Conservation ==
As of 2026, Mammillaria voburnensis has not been assessed for the IUCN Red List. However, like all cacti, it is listed in Appendix II of the Convention on International Trade in Endangered Species of Wild Fauna and Flora (CITES), which regulates international trade to ensure it does not threaten the species' survival in the wild.

== Common names ==
The plant is known by several common names in its native range, including:

- "Biznaga de woburn" (Spanish)
- "Biznaga tropical" (Spanish)
