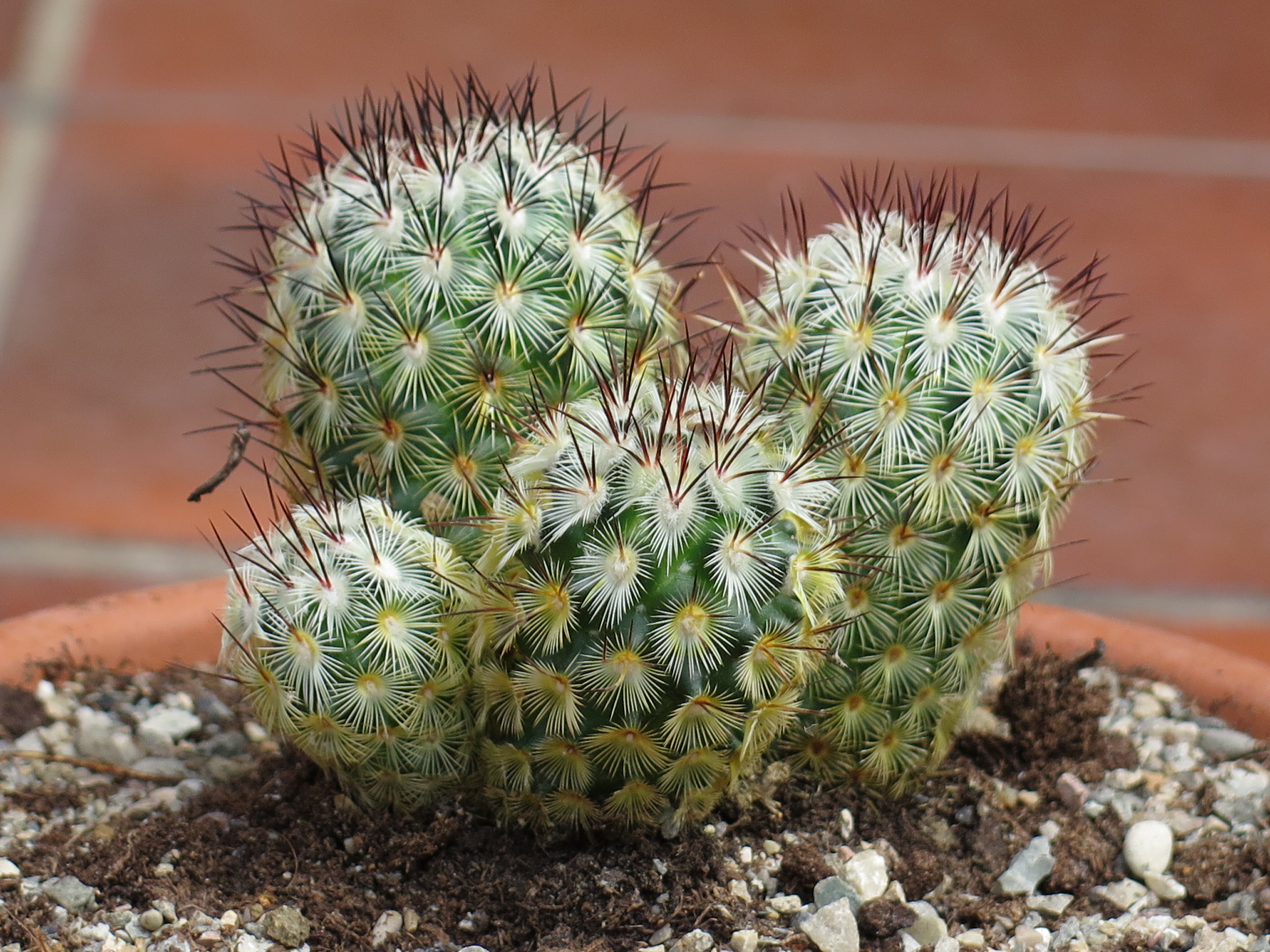

Conservation status
- Endangered (IUCN 3.1)

Scientific classification
- Kingdom: Plantae
- Clade: Tracheophytes
- Clade: Angiosperms
- Clade: Eudicots
- Order: Caryophyllales
- Family: Cactaceae
- Subfamily: Cactoideae
- Genus: Mammillaria
- Species: M. microhelia

Binomial name
- Mammillaria microhelia Werderm.

Synonyms
- List: Krainzia microhelia (Werderm.) Doweld; Leptocladia microhelia (Werderm.) Buxb.; Leptocladia microheliopsis (Werderm.) Buxb.; Leptocladodia microhelia (Werderm.) Buxb.; Leptocladodia microheliopsis (Werderm.) Buxb.; Mammillaria droegeana (K.Schum.) Borg; Mammillaria microheliopsis Werderm.; Mammillaria rhodantha f. droegeana (K.Schum.) Schelle; Mammillaria rhodantha var. droegeana K.Schum.

= Mammillaria microhelia =

Species of cactus

Mammillaria microhelia is a species of plant in the family Cactaceae. It is endemic to Mexico. Its natural habitat is hot deserts.
