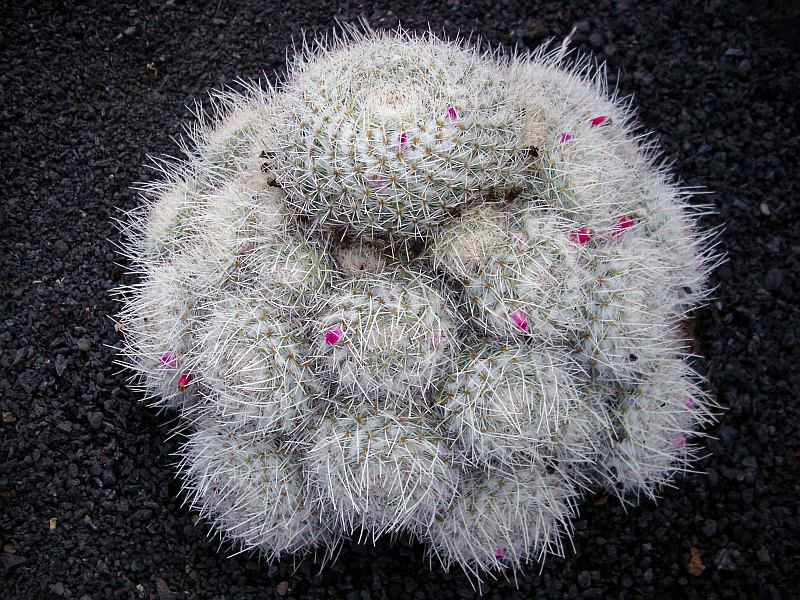
- M. geminispina
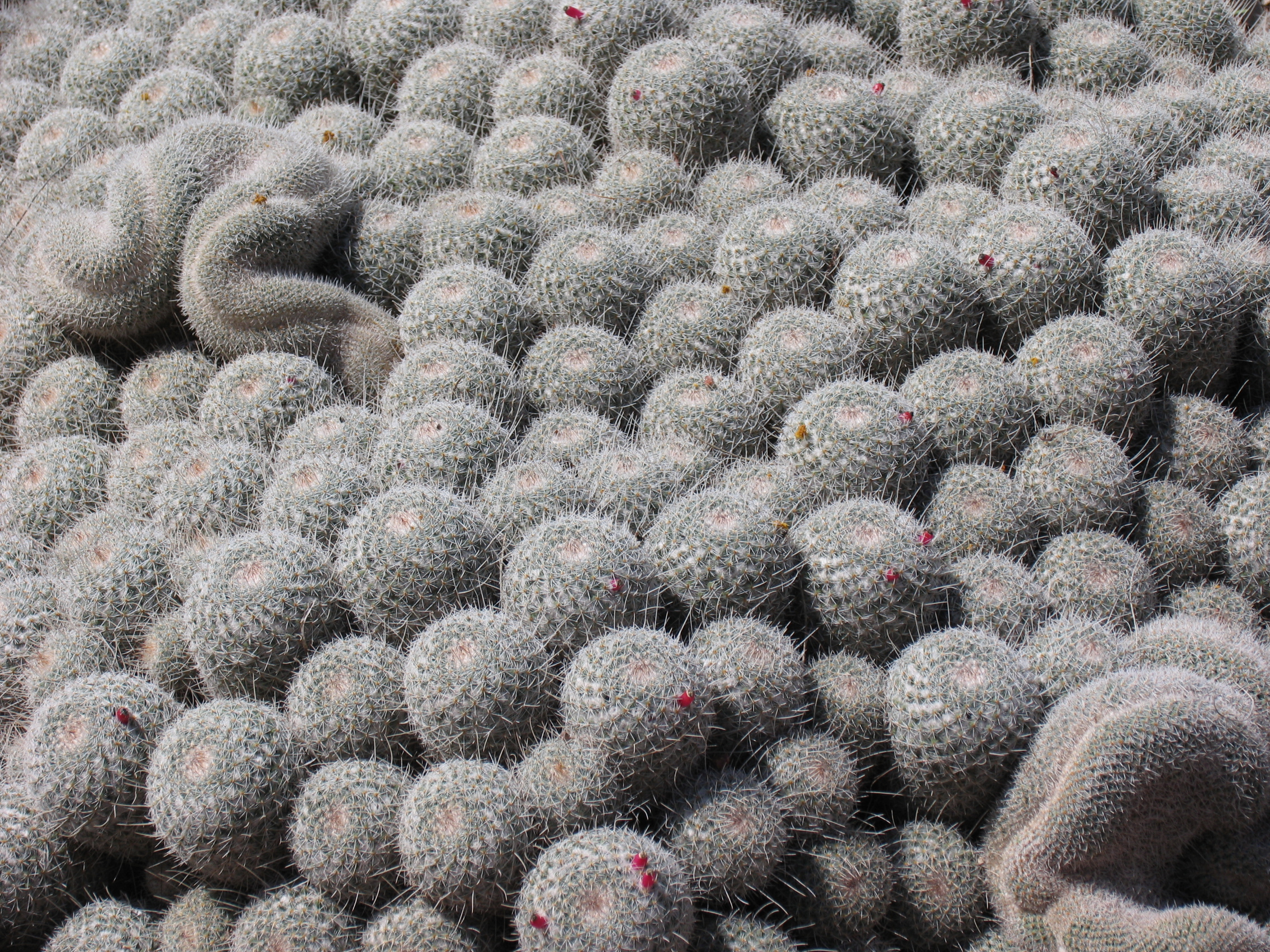
- Patch of M. geminispina, with examples of crested mutations.

Conservation status
- Least Concern (IUCN 3.1)

Scientific classification
- Kingdom: Plantae
- Clade: Tracheophytes
- Clade: Angiosperms
- Clade: Eudicots
- Order: Caryophyllales
- Family: Cactaceae
- Subfamily: Cactoideae
- Genus: Mammillaria
- Species: M. geminispina

Binomial name
- Mammillaria geminispina Haw.

= Mammillaria geminispina =

Species of cactus

Mammillaria geminispina, the twin spined cactus, is a species of flowering plant in the family Cactaceae, native to central Mexico.

== Description ==
The growth habit of M. geminispina is variable; most grow into clump-forming colonies, though some are solitary specimens, while others still have only very few offsets. The species matures with long, white spines at the end of conical tubercles, distinct among the Mammillaria. Between these tubercles is white wool. Foliage tissue is a teal-blue to dark seafoam-green.

== Flowers ==
Carmine-pink flowers are borne in a crown formation around the head of the plant, with blooming occurring in summer and autumn. Flowers are pollinated and develop into small, ovate fruits, which are technically edible and have a tart, fruity flavor. These fruits are consumed by birds, rodents and some reptiles, which aid in spreading the species' seed to new locations.

== Cultivation ==
Mammillaria geminispina is one of several Mammillaria species to be cultivated. It has gained the Royal Horticultural Society's Award of Garden Merit.
