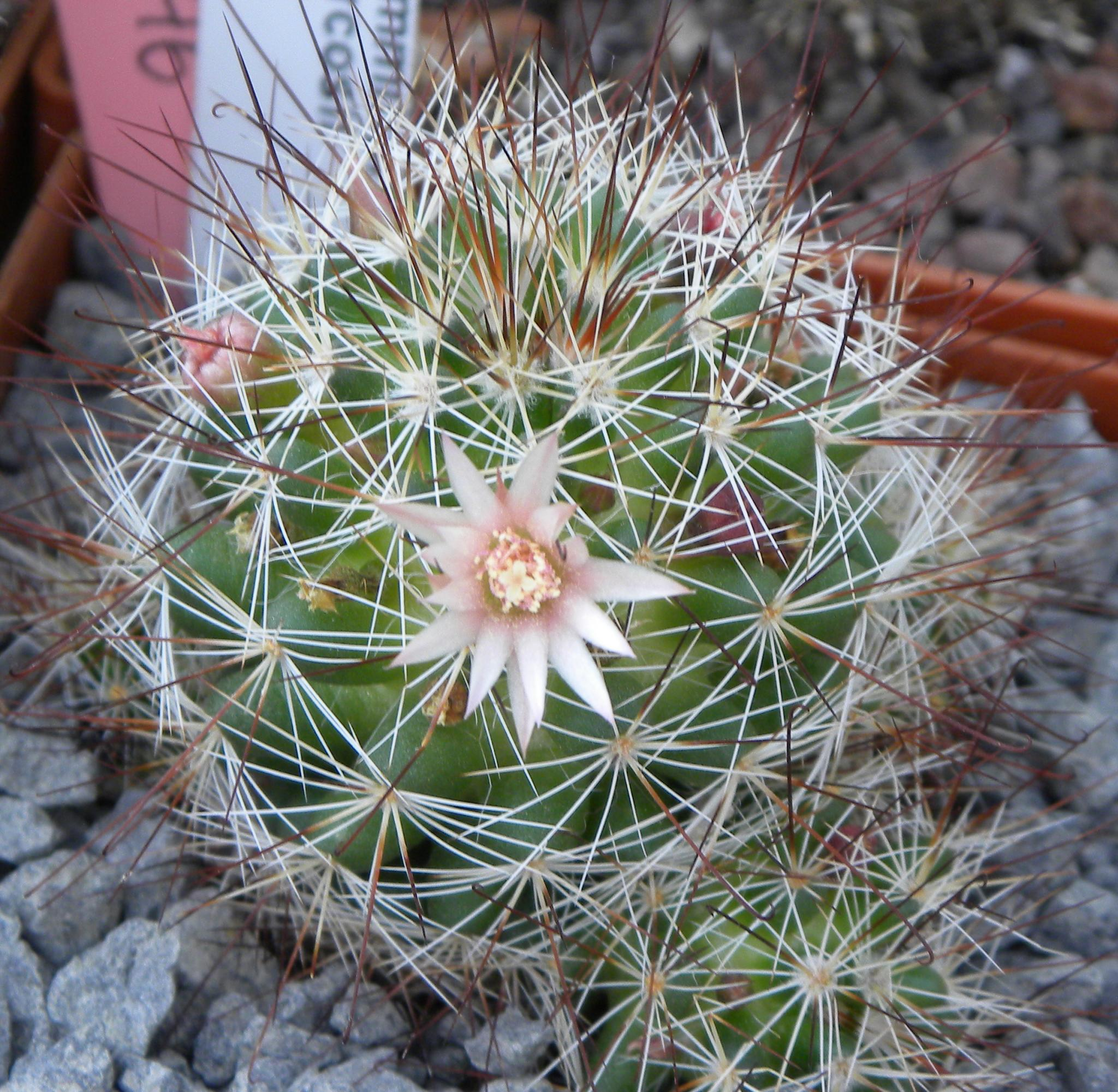

Conservation status
- Critically Endangered (IUCN 3.1)

Scientific classification
- Kingdom: Plantae
- Clade: Tracheophytes
- Clade: Angiosperms
- Clade: Eudicots
- Order: Caryophyllales
- Family: Cactaceae
- Subfamily: Cactoideae
- Genus: Mammillaria
- Species: M. multihamata

Binomial name
- Mammillaria multihamata Boed.

Synonyms
- Chilita multihamata (Boed.) Orcutt; Ebnerella multihamata (Boed.) Buxb.; Mammillaria marcosii W.A.Fitz Maur., B.Fitz Maur. & Glass; Neomammillaria multihamata (Boed.) Britton & Rose

= Mammillaria multihamata =

Species of cactus

Mammillaria multihamata is a species of flowering plant in the family Cactaceae. It is a succulent cactus subshrub endemic to northeastern Mexico, where it ranges from Guanajuato to San Luis Potosí. Its natural habitat is submontane semi-desert matorral (shrubland), where it grows in steeply sloping volcanic rocky terrain at about 1200 meters elevation.

The IUCN Red List assesses the species as Critically Endangered, under the synonym Mammillaria marcosii.
