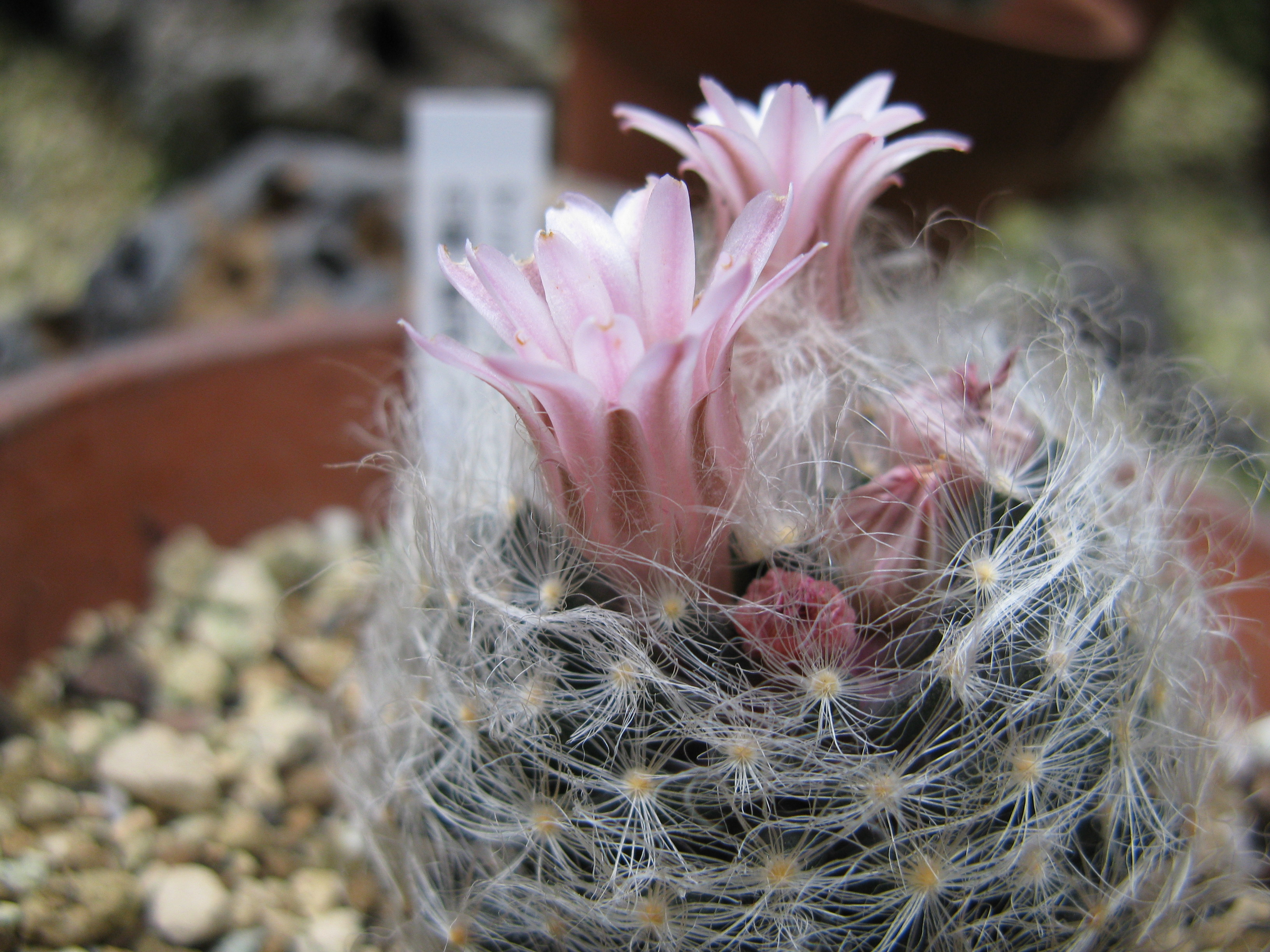

Conservation status
- Endangered (IUCN 3.1)

Scientific classification
- Kingdom: Plantae
- Clade: Tracheophytes
- Clade: Angiosperms
- Clade: Eudicots
- Order: Caryophyllales
- Family: Cactaceae
- Subfamily: Cactoideae
- Genus: Mammillaria
- Species: M. aureilanata

Binomial name
- Mammillaria aureilanata Backeb.

= Mammillaria aureilanata =

Species of cactus

Mammillaria aureilanata is a species of plant in the family Cactaceae. It is endemic to Mexico. Its natural habitat is hot deserts.
