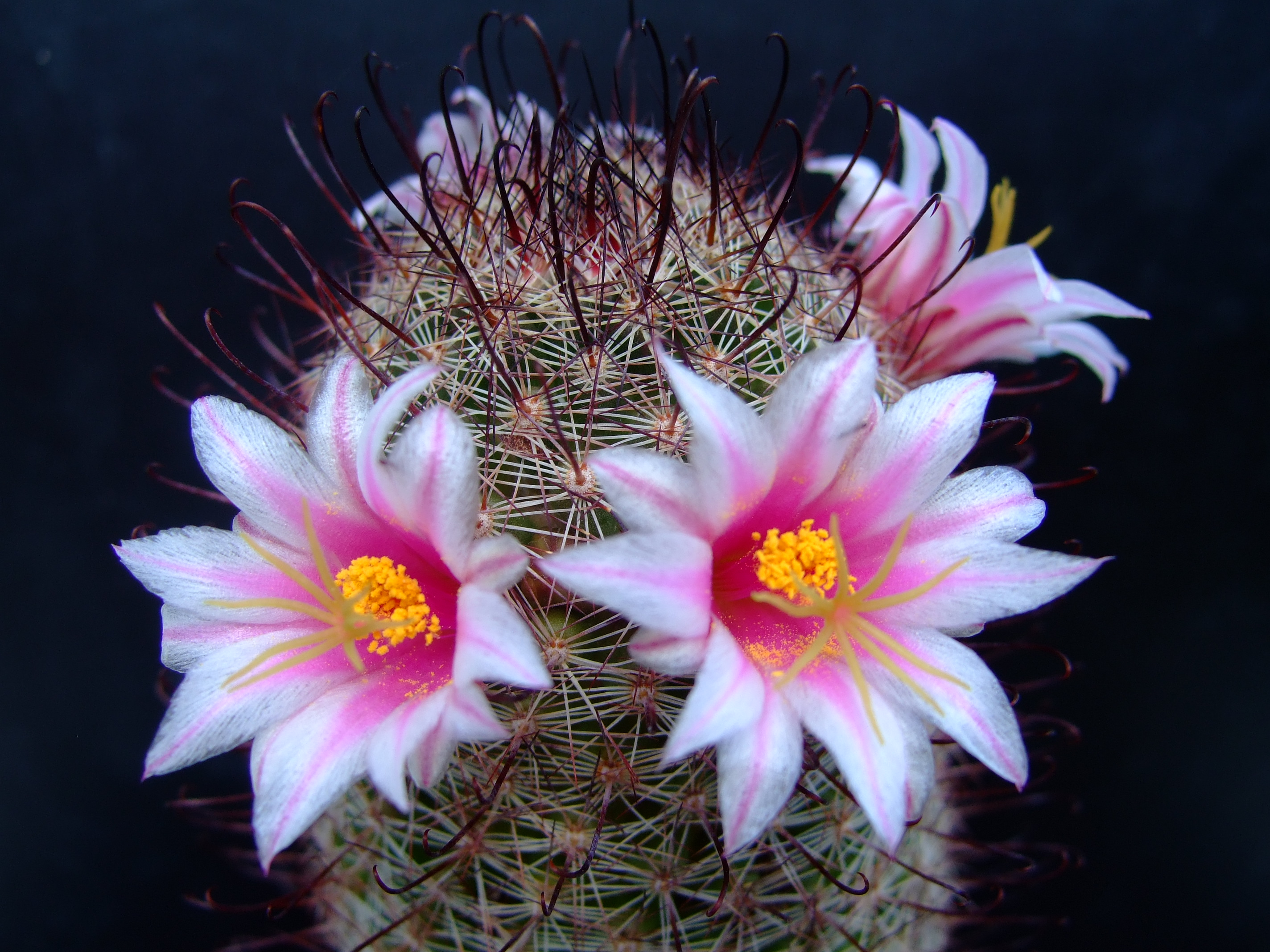

Scientific classification
- Kingdom: Plantae
- Clade: Tracheophytes
- Clade: Angiosperms
- Clade: Eudicots
- Order: Caryophyllales
- Family: Cactaceae
- Subfamily: Cactoideae
- Genus: Cochemiea
- Species: C. sheldonii

Binomial name
- Cochemiea sheldonii (Britton & Rose) Doweld 2001

Synonyms
- Chilita sheldonii (Britton & Rose) Orcutt 1926; Ebnerella sheldonii (Britton & Rose) Buxb. 1951; Mammillaria grahamii subsp. sheldonii (Britton & Rose) D.R.Hunt 2005; Mammillaria microcarpa var. sheldonii (Britton & Rose) Neutel. 1986; Mammillaria milleri var. sheldonii (Britton & Rose) Neutel. 1986; Mammillaria sheldonii (Britton & Rose) Boed. 1933; Neomammillaria sheldonii Britton & Rose 1923; Chilita alamensis (R.T.Craig) Buxb. 1954; Chilita gueldemanniana (Backeb.) Buxb. 1954; Chilita inae (R.T.Craig) Buxb. 1954; Chilita swinglei (Britton & Rose) Orcutt 1926; Cochemiea swinglei (Britton & Rose) Doweld 2000; Ebnerella guirocobensis (R.T.Craig) Buxb. 1951; Ebnerella inae (R.T.Craig) Buxb. 1951; Ebnerella swinglei (Britton & Rose) Buxb. 1951; Mammillaria alamensis R.T.Craig 1945; Mammillaria dioica subsp. swinglei (Britton & Rose) Hoeve 2013; Mammillaria gueldemanniana Backeb. 1941; Mammillaria gueldemanniana var. guirocobensis (R.T.Craig) Backeb. 1961; Mammillaria guirocobensis R.T.Craig 1945; Mammillaria inae R.T.Craig 1939; Mammillaria marnieriana Backeb. 1952; Mammillaria microcarpa f. gueldemanniana (Backeb.) Neutel. 1986; Mammillaria microcarpa f. swinglei (Britton & Rose) Neutel. 1986; Mammillaria milleri f. gueldemanniana (Backeb.) Neutel. 1986; Mammillaria milleri f. swinglei (Britton & Rose) Neutel. 1986; Mammillaria pseudoalamensis Backeb. 1953; Mammillaria swinglei (Britton & Rose) Boed. 1933; Mammillaria swinglei var. diabloa P.C.Fisch. 1992; Neomammillaria alamensis (R.T.Craig) Y.Itô 1981; Neomammillaria inae (R.T.Craig) 1981; Neomammillaria swinglei Britton & Rose 1923

= Cochemiea sheldonii =

Species of cactus

Cochemiea sheldonii is a species of cactus found in Arizona and Mexico.

== Description ==
The plants branch out from the base and usually form small cushions. The slender, cylindrical shoots are dull green, often reddish and reach heights of growth of 8 to 20 centimeters with diameters of up to 6 centimeters. The cylindrical, keel-shaped warts on four sides at the base do not contain any milky sap. The axillae are bare and sometimes have some bristles. The 1 to 4 strong central spines are up to 15 millimeters long. The lower one is stretched and either straight or hooked. The 9 to 24 radial spines are white with dark tips and are 6 to 8 millimeters long. The funnel-shaped, light purple-pink flowers are 2 inches long and in diameter. The edges of the petals are paler and almost white. The flower often opens for several days. The stamens consist of light purple stamens and orange-yellow anthers. The style is light pink to yellow. The light olive, 3 to 5 millimeter long stigma is 6 to 8 parts and protrudes over the stamens by about 4 millimeters. The club-shaped, pale scarlet-red fruits have a slightly sloping flower remnant, are 25 to 30 millimeters long and contain black, spherical seeds.

== Distribution ==
This species, native to the desert and dry scrubland biomes of southern Arizona and northern Mexico, specifically in the Mexican states of Sonora, Sinaloa, and western Chihuahua.

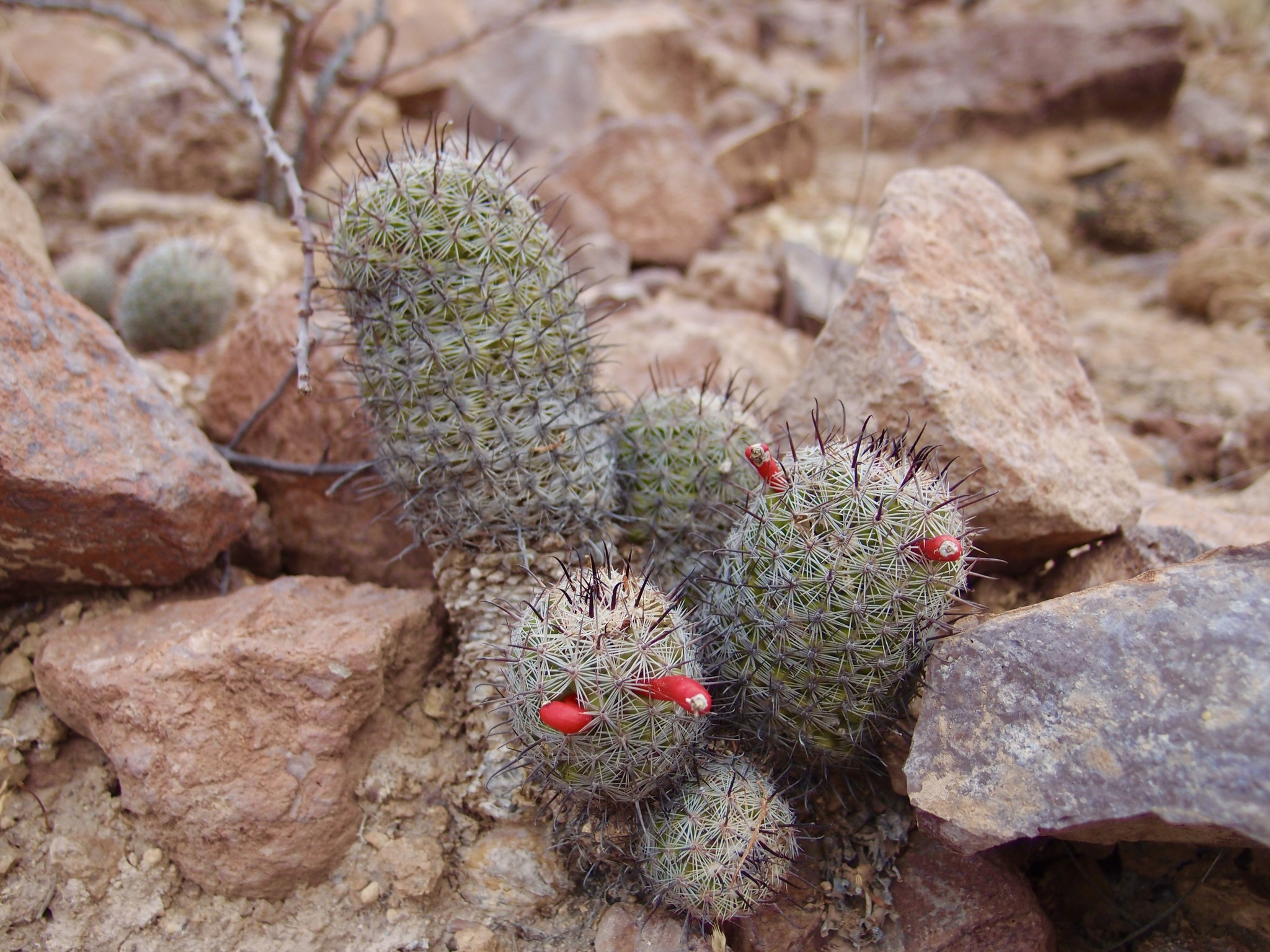
Plant fruiting in San Carlos Nuevo Guaymas, Sonora, Mexico

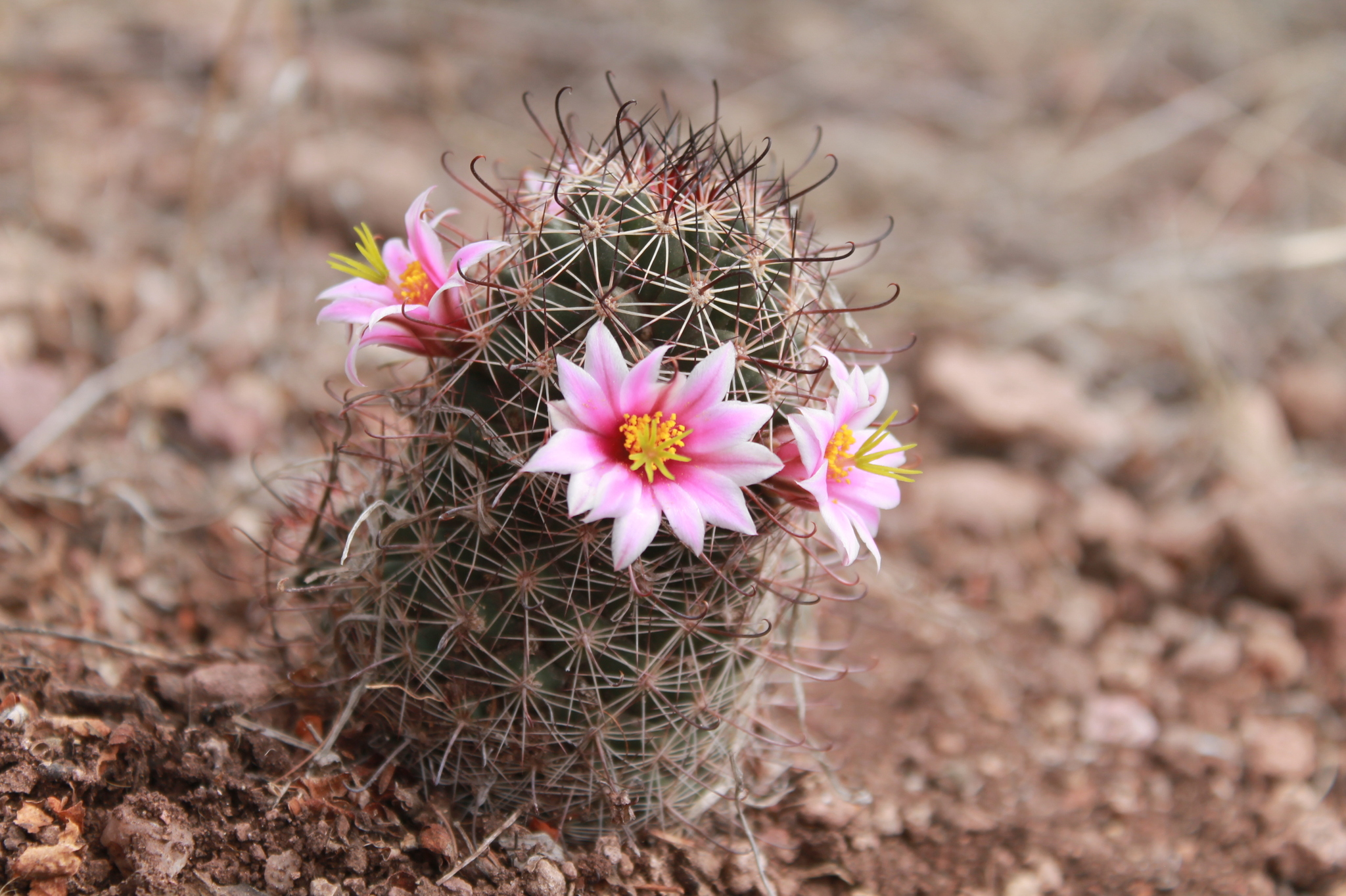
Plant blooming in Zona de Granjas, Sonora, Mexico

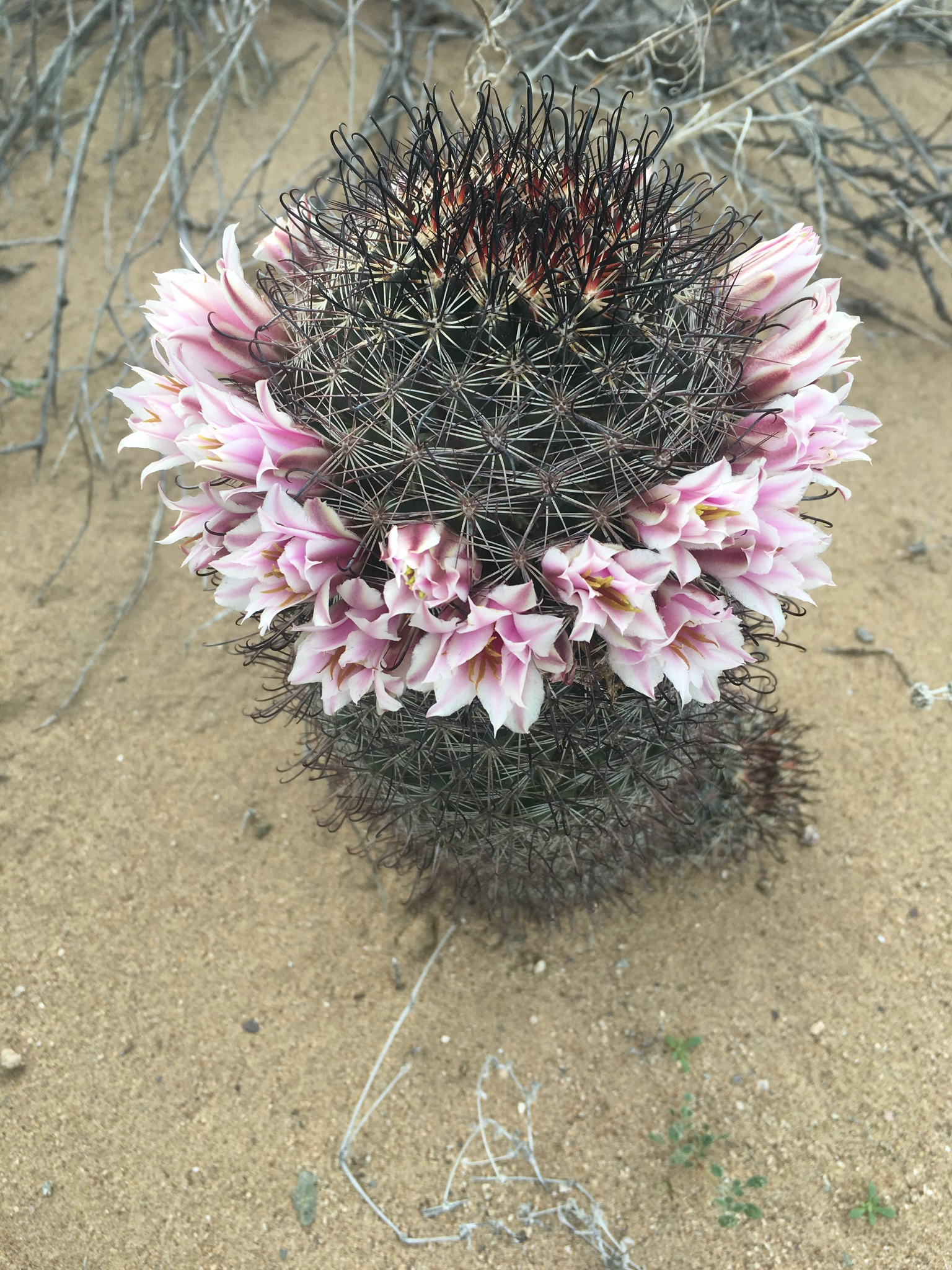
Plant blooming in Caborca, Sonora, Mexico

== Taxonomy ==
This species was first described as Neomammillaria sheldonii in 1923 by Nathaniel Lord Britton and Joseph Nelson Rose. The specific epithet honors Charles Alexander Sheldon, an American nature enthusiast and mining company owner in Mexico. In 2001, Alexander Borissovitch Doweld reclassified the species into the genus Cochemiea, resulting in its current scientific name, Cochemiea sheldonii.
