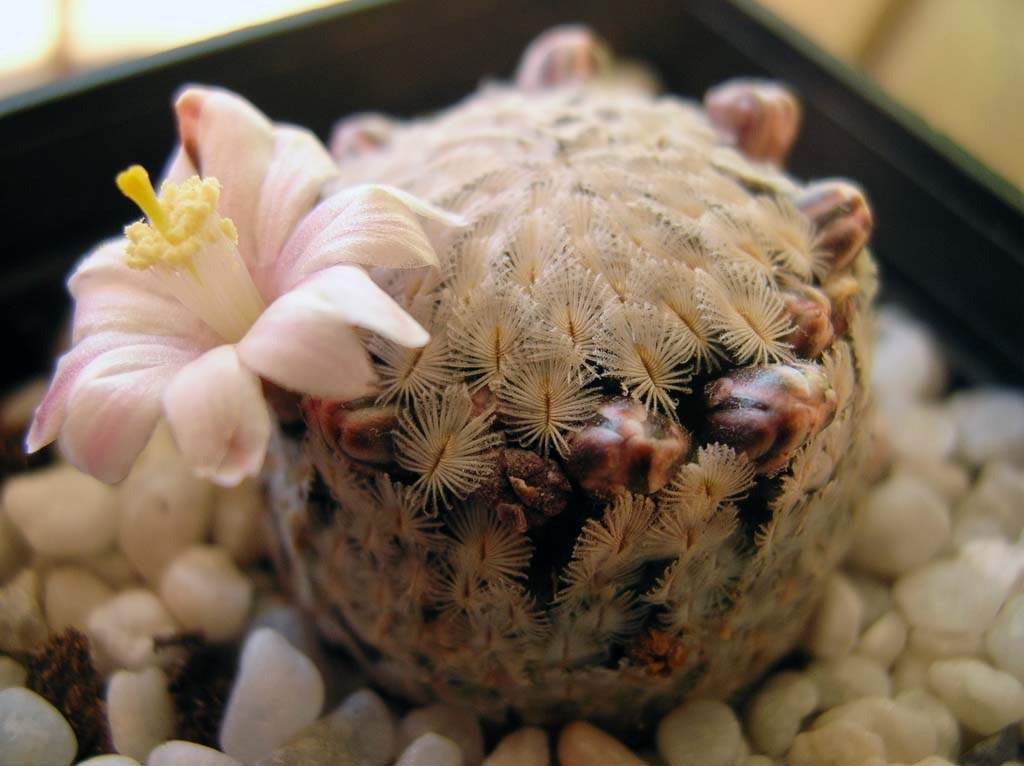

Conservation status
- Critically Endangered (IUCN 3.1)

Scientific classification
- Kingdom: Plantae
- Clade: Tracheophytes
- Clade: Angiosperms
- Clade: Eudicots
- Order: Caryophyllales
- Family: Cactaceae
- Subfamily: Cactoideae
- Genus: Mammillaria
- Species: M. sanchez-mejoradae

Binomial name
- Mammillaria sanchez-mejoradae Rodr.González

Subspecies
- Mammillaria sanchez-mejoradae subsp. breviplumosa (García-Mor., Ramírez-Chap., Sigala-Chav. & Iamonico) Guiggi; Mammillaria sanchez-mejoradae subsp. sanchez-mejoradae

Synonyms
- Escobariopsis sanchez-mejoradae (Rodr.González) Doweld

= Mammillaria sanchez-mejoradae =

Species of cactus

Mammillaria sanchez-mejoradae is a species of flowering plant in the family Cactaceae. It is a succulent cactus subshrub endemic to Nuevo León state of northeastern Mexico. Its natural habitat is hilly dry scrubland on calcareous rocks. It is a Critically endangered species, threatened by habitat loss.

Two subspecies are accepted.

- Mammillaria sanchez-mejoradae subsp. breviplumosa (García-Mor., Ramírez-Chap., Sigala-Chav. & Iamonico) Guiggi
- Mammillaria sanchez-mejoradae subsp. sanchez-mejoradae
