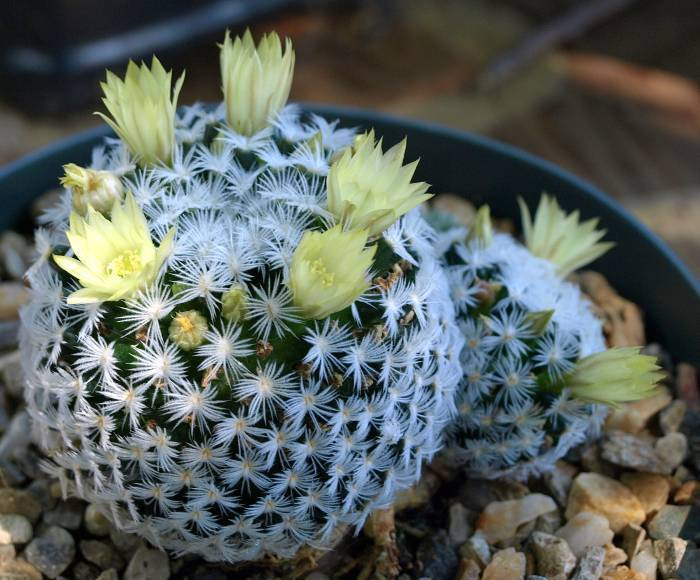

Conservation status
- Critically Endangered (IUCN 3.1)

Scientific classification
- Kingdom: Plantae
- Clade: Tracheophytes
- Clade: Angiosperms
- Clade: Eudicots
- Order: Caryophyllales
- Family: Cactaceae
- Subfamily: Cactoideae
- Genus: Mammillaria
- Species: M. duwei

Binomial name
- Mammillaria duwei H.Rogozinski & P.Braun

= Mammillaria duwei =

Species of cactus

Mammillaria duwei is a species of flowering plant in the cactus family. It is endemic to Mexico, where it occurs only in the state of Guanajuato. It is known from only one location. It is known commonly as the biznaguita.

This is a critically endangered species due to its limited distribution and illegal collecting for trade. There are perhaps 500 mature individuals left in the wild.
