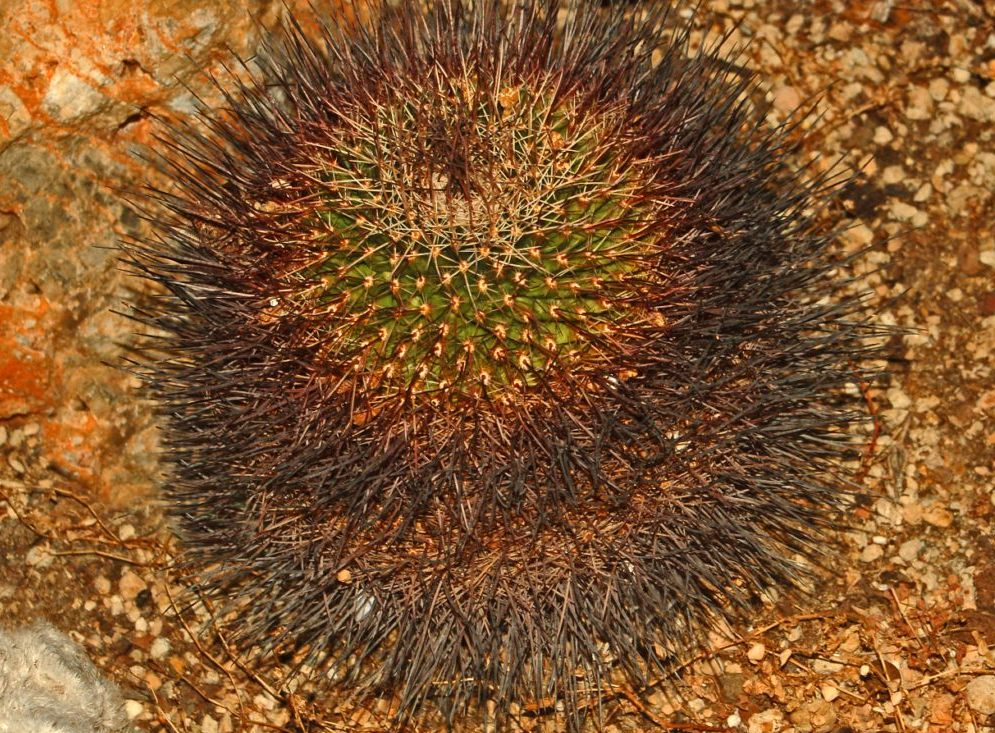
- Mammillaria grusonii at the botanical garden of Villa Durazzo-Pallavicini, Genova Pegli

Scientific classification
- Kingdom: Plantae
- Clade: Tracheophytes
- Clade: Angiosperms
- Clade: Eudicots
- Order: Caryophyllales
- Family: Cactaceae
- Subfamily: Cactoideae
- Genus: Mammillaria
- Species: M. grusonii

Binomial name
- Mammillaria grusonii Runge

Synonyms
- Mammillaria zeyeriana F.Haage ex K.Schum. (1898); Mammillaria grusonii var. zeyeriana (F.Haage ex K.Schum.) E.Kuhn (1980); Mammillaria pachycylindrica Backeb. (1959); Mammillaria grusonii var. pachycylindrica (Backeb.) E.Kuhn (1980); Mammillaria tesopacensis var. papasquiarensis Bravo (1966); Mammillaria papasquiarensis (Bravo) Repp. (1987); Mammillaria durangicola Repp. (1987)

= Mammillaria grusonii =

Species of cactus

Mammillaria grusonii is a cactus in the genus Mammillaria of the family Cactaceae. The epithet grusonii honors the inventor, scientist, industrialist and cacti collector Hermann Gruson of Magdeburg.

== Description ==
Crested specimen in habitat in Durango, Mexico

Mammillaria grusonii usually grows singly. This cactus is spherical to thick cylindrical, bright green, with a diameter of about 25 centimetres (9.8 in). The tubercles are four-angled and contain latex. The axillae are initially woolly, later naked. The spines are straight, reddish and becomes white with age. The two central spines are 0.4 to 0.6 centimeters long, while the 12 to 14 radial spines are 0.6 to 0.8 centimeters long. The pale yellow, bell-shaped flowers are up to 2.5 centimeters long and have an equal diameter. The fruits are bright scarlet and contain brown seeds.

== Distribution ==
This species can be found in Mexico (in the states of Coahuila and Durango), at an altitude of 800–1,850 metres (2,620–6,070 ft) above sea level.
