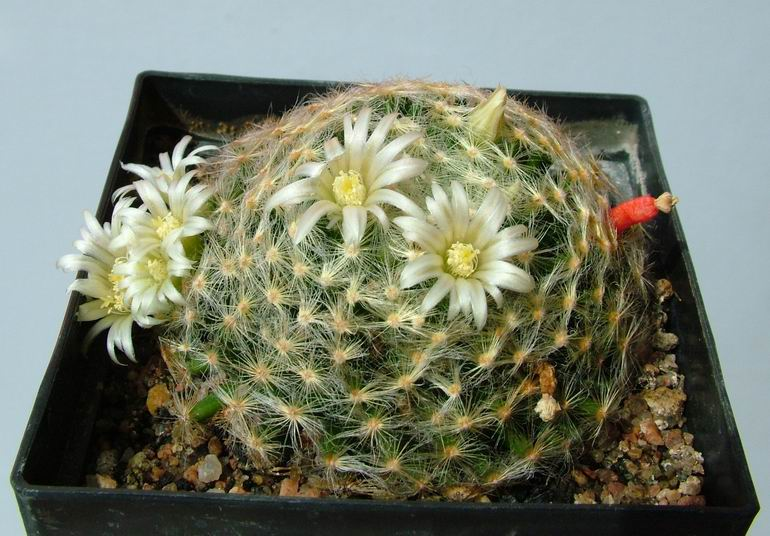

Scientific classification
- Kingdom: Plantae
- Clade: Tracheophytes
- Clade: Angiosperms
- Clade: Eudicots
- Order: Caryophyllales
- Family: Cactaceae
- Subfamily: Cactoideae
- Genus: Mammillaria
- Species: M. schiedeana

Binomial name
- Mammillaria schiedeana C.Ehrenb.

= Mammillaria schiedeana =

Species of cactus

Mammillaria schiedeana is a species of Mammillaria native to Mexico that was first described in 1838 by C. Ehrenb.

== Description ==
Mammillaria schiedeana has a circle of yellow thorns around its growing point, with the rest being white. It has turbicles like all other Mammillaria species. This plant is also a rapid clumper.

== Flowers ==
Its flowers are white and in a "crown" like other Mammillaria species.
