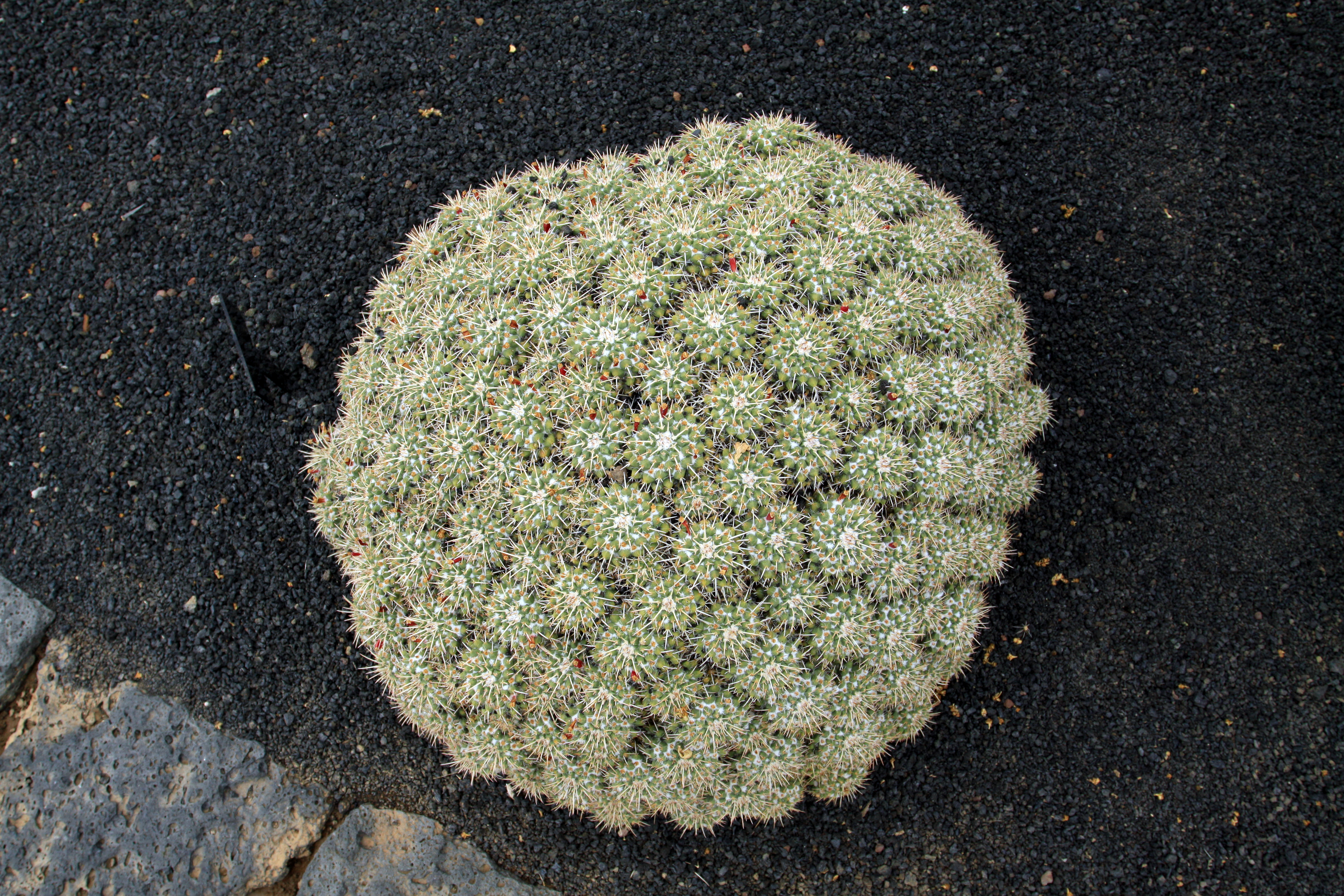

Scientific classification
- Kingdom: Plantae
- Clade: Tracheophytes
- Clade: Angiosperms
- Clade: Eudicots
- Order: Caryophyllales
- Family: Cactaceae
- Subfamily: Cactoideae
- Genus: Mammillaria
- Species: M. compressa

Binomial name
- Mammillaria compressa DC., 1828

= Mammillaria compressa =

Species of cactus

Mammillaria compressa, commonly called mother of hundreds, is a species of cactus in the subfamily Cactoideae. It is native to northern and southern Mexico, and is cultivated as an ornamental plant. It blooms in the winter and early spring, with bell-shaped flowers that range from a purplish pink to red color. Its curved spines were traditionally used as hooks for fishing.

== Gallery ==
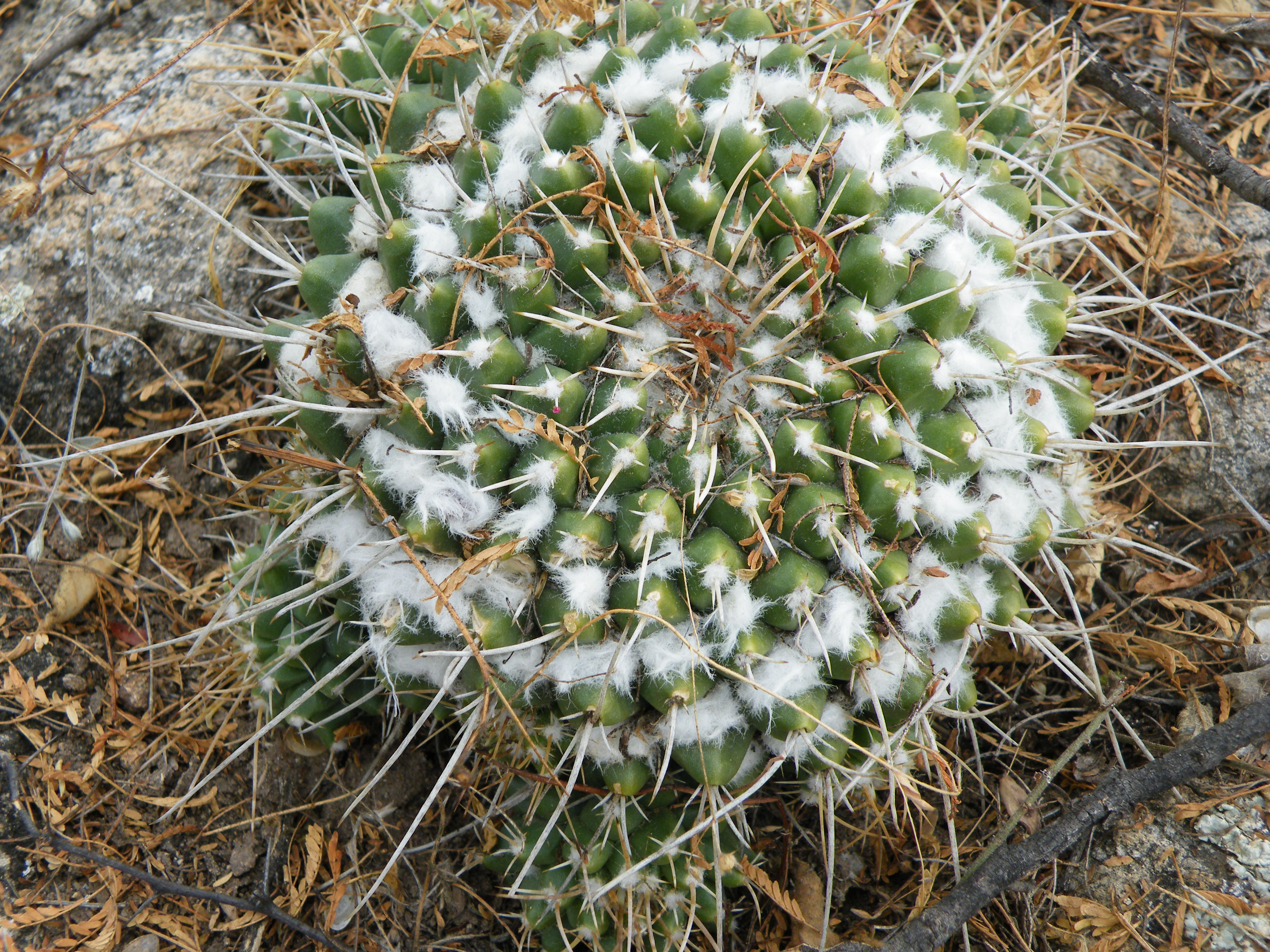

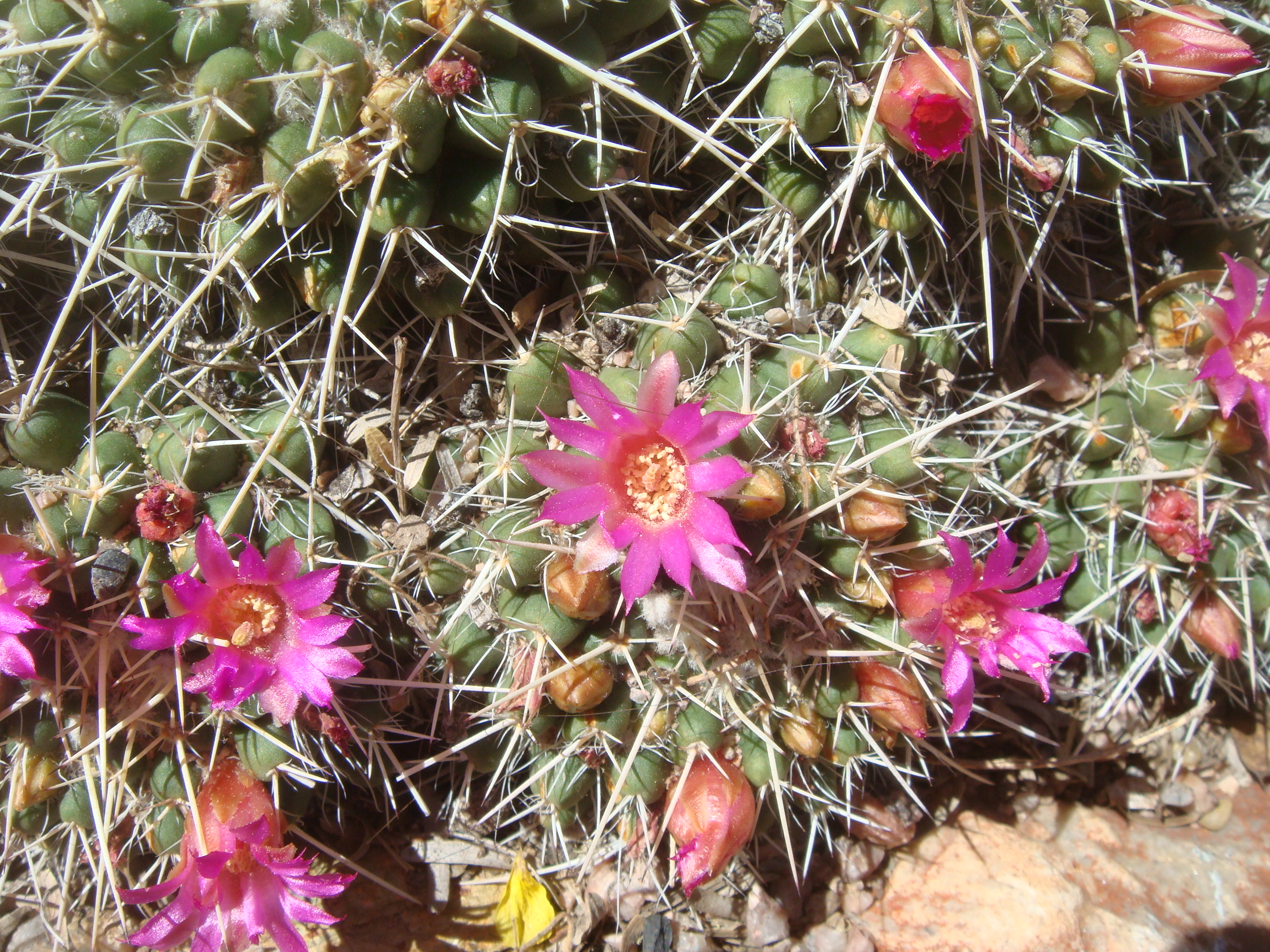

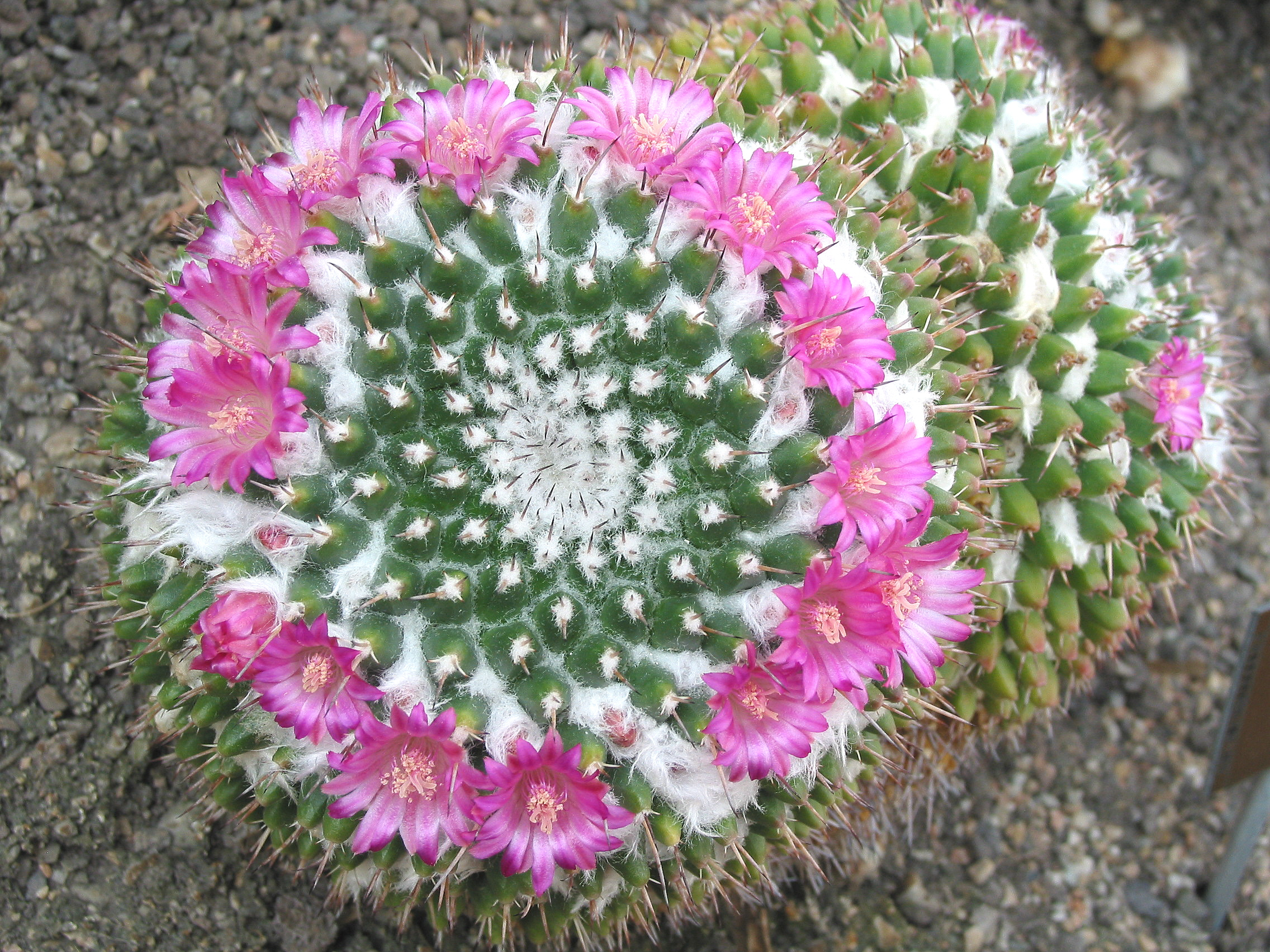

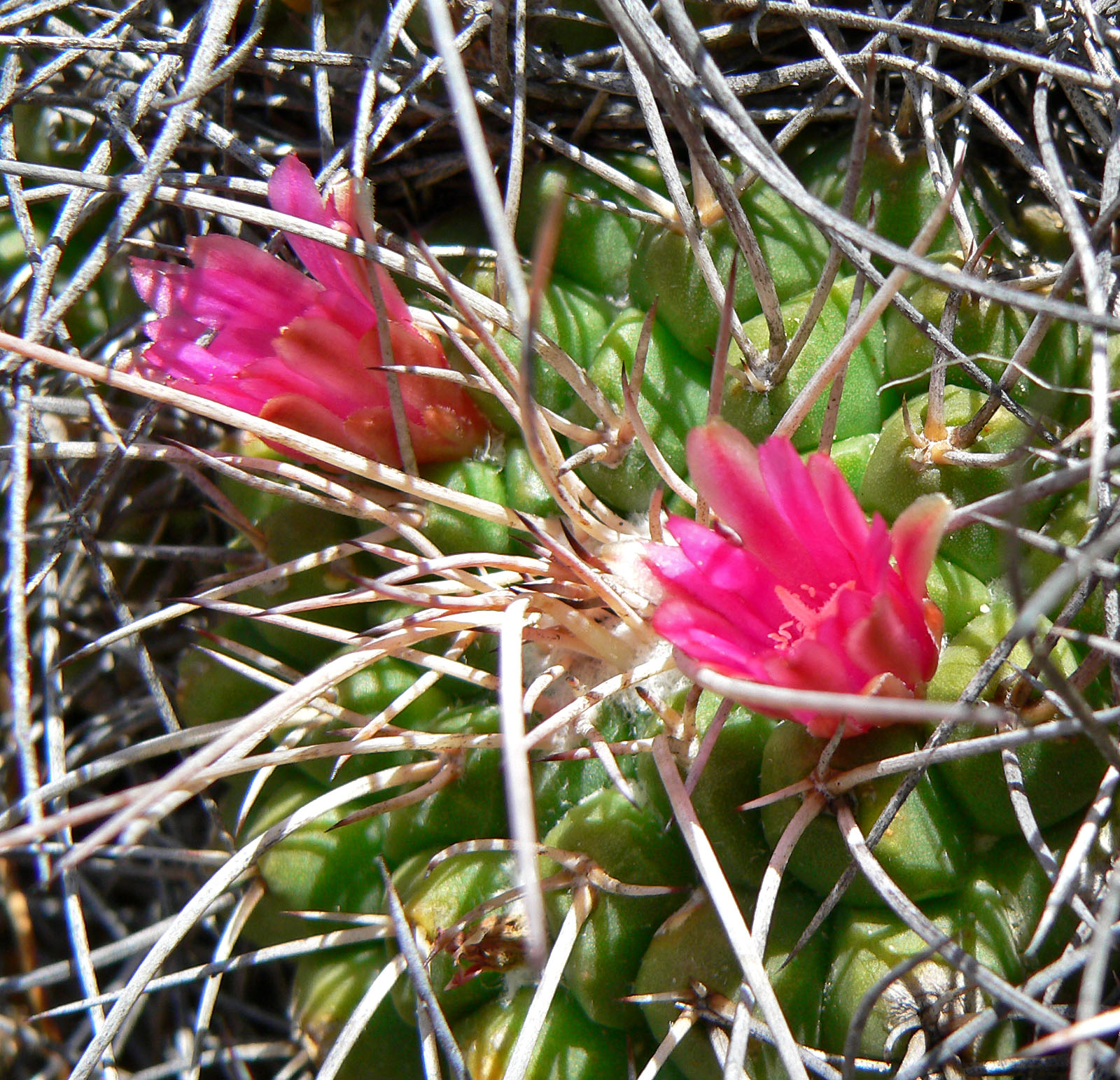
Flower detail

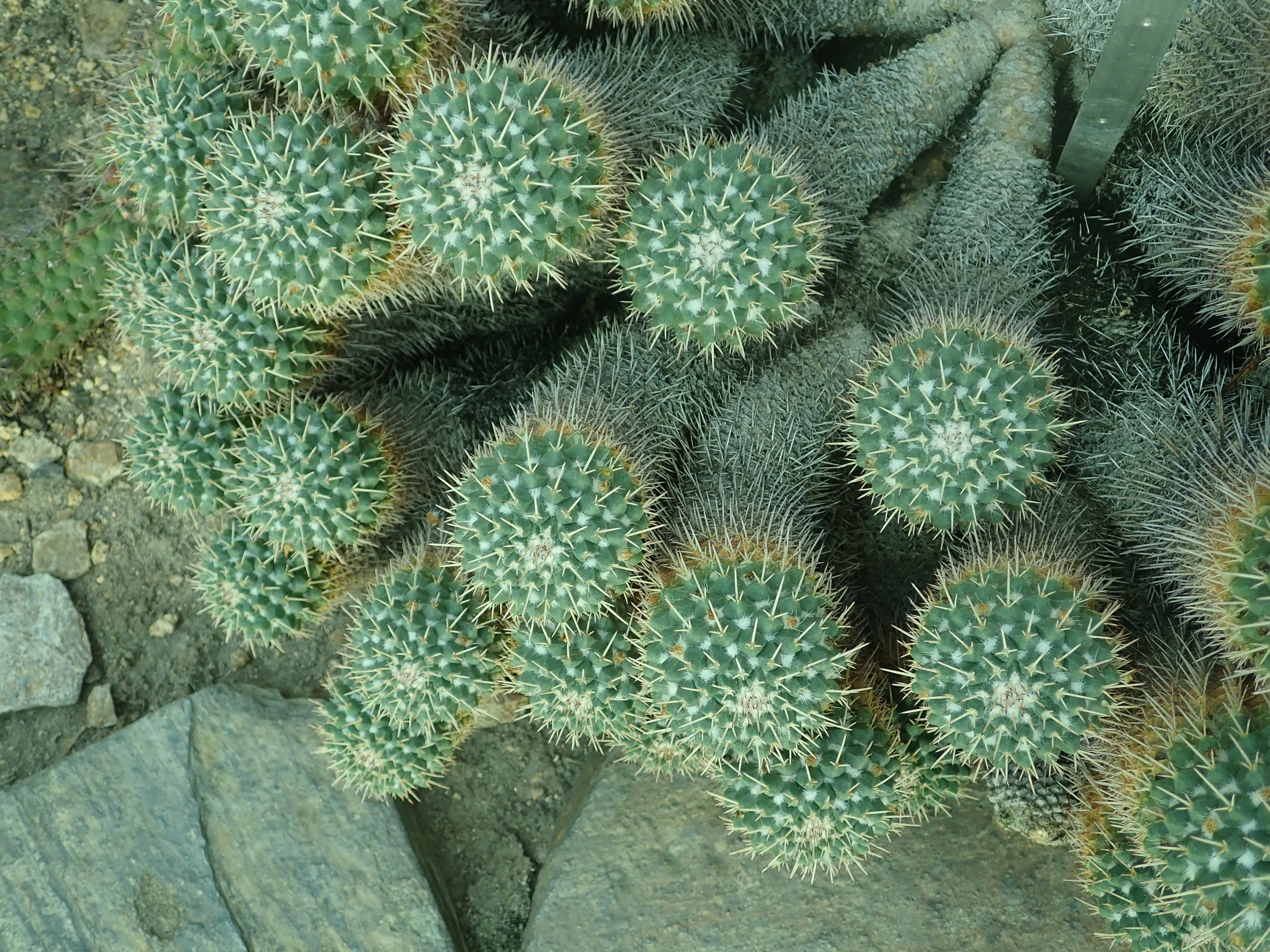
Mammillaria compressa at the botanical garden in Berlin

== Alkaloids ==

Ushinsunine (Micheline A) is an aporphine alkaloid extracted from Michelia compressa MAXIM. var. Formosana KANEHIRA.
