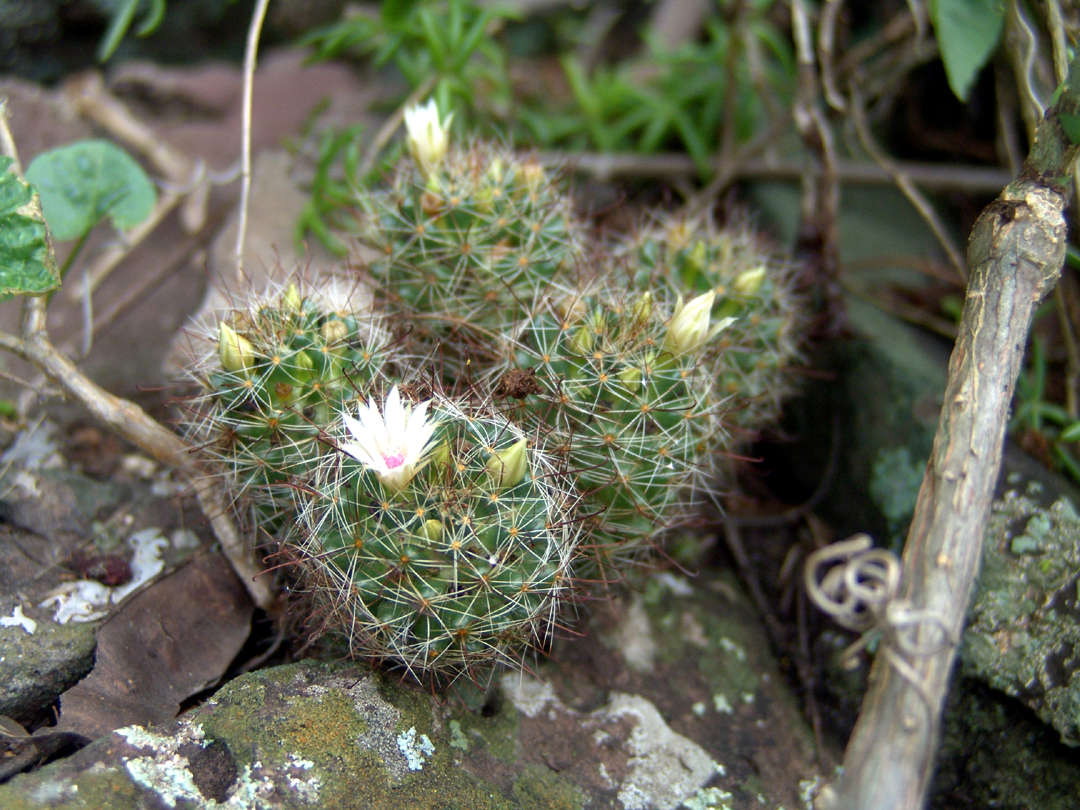

Conservation status
- Endangered (IUCN 3.1)

Scientific classification
- Kingdom: Plantae
- Clade: Tracheophytes
- Clade: Angiosperms
- Clade: Eudicots
- Order: Caryophyllales
- Family: Cactaceae
- Subfamily: Cactoideae
- Genus: Mammillaria
- Species: M. mathildae

Binomial name
- Mammillaria mathildae Kraehenbuehl & Krainz

= Mammillaria mathildae =

Species of cactus

Mammillaria mathildae is a species of plant in the family Cactaceae. It is endemic to Querétaro, Mexico. Its natural habitat is hot deserts. It is of IUCN Red List Vulnerable status and threatened by habitat loss.
