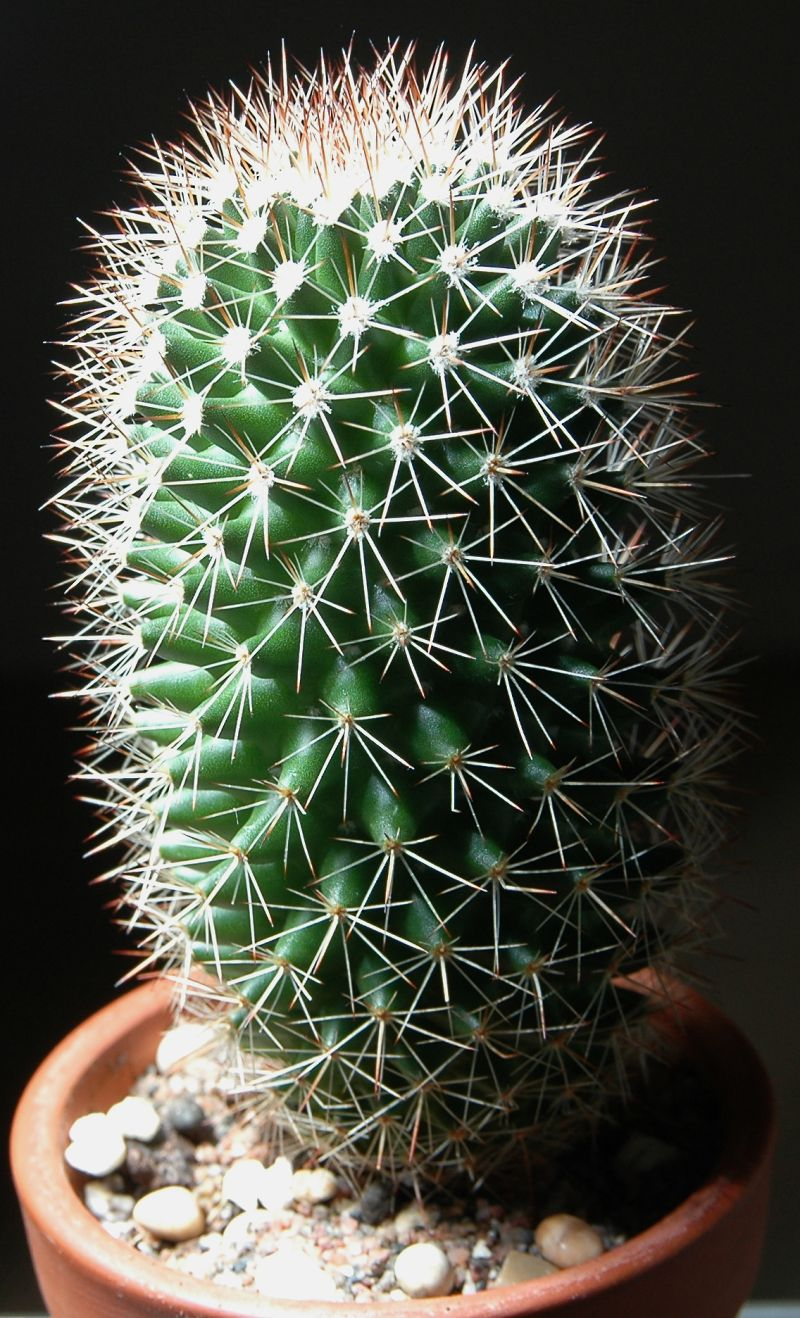

Conservation status
- Data Deficient (IUCN 3.1)

Scientific classification
- Kingdom: Plantae
- Clade: Tracheophytes
- Clade: Angiosperms
- Clade: Eudicots
- Order: Caryophyllales
- Family: Cactaceae
- Subfamily: Cactoideae
- Genus: Mammillaria
- Species: M. backebergiana

Binomial name
- Mammillaria backebergiana F.G.Buchenau, 1966

= Mammillaria backebergiana =

Species of cactus

Mammillaria backebergiana is a species of cactus in the subfamily Cactoideae. It is native to Mexico and can be found on cliffs at elevations of around 1,900 m.
