= Mammillaria anniana =

Conservation status
- Critically Endangered (IUCN 3.1)

Scientific classification
- Kingdom: Plantae
- Clade: Tracheophytes
- Clade: Angiosperms
- Clade: Eudicots
- Order: Caryophyllales
- Family: Cactaceae
- Subfamily: Cactoideae
- Genus: Mammillaria
- Species: M. anniana

Binomial name
- Mammillaria anniana Glass & R.C.Foster

Species of plant

Mammillaria anniana is a species of plant in the family Cactaceae. It is endemic to Tamaulipas state of northeastern Mexico. Its natural habitat is hot deserts. It is a Critically endangered species, threatened by habitat loss.
