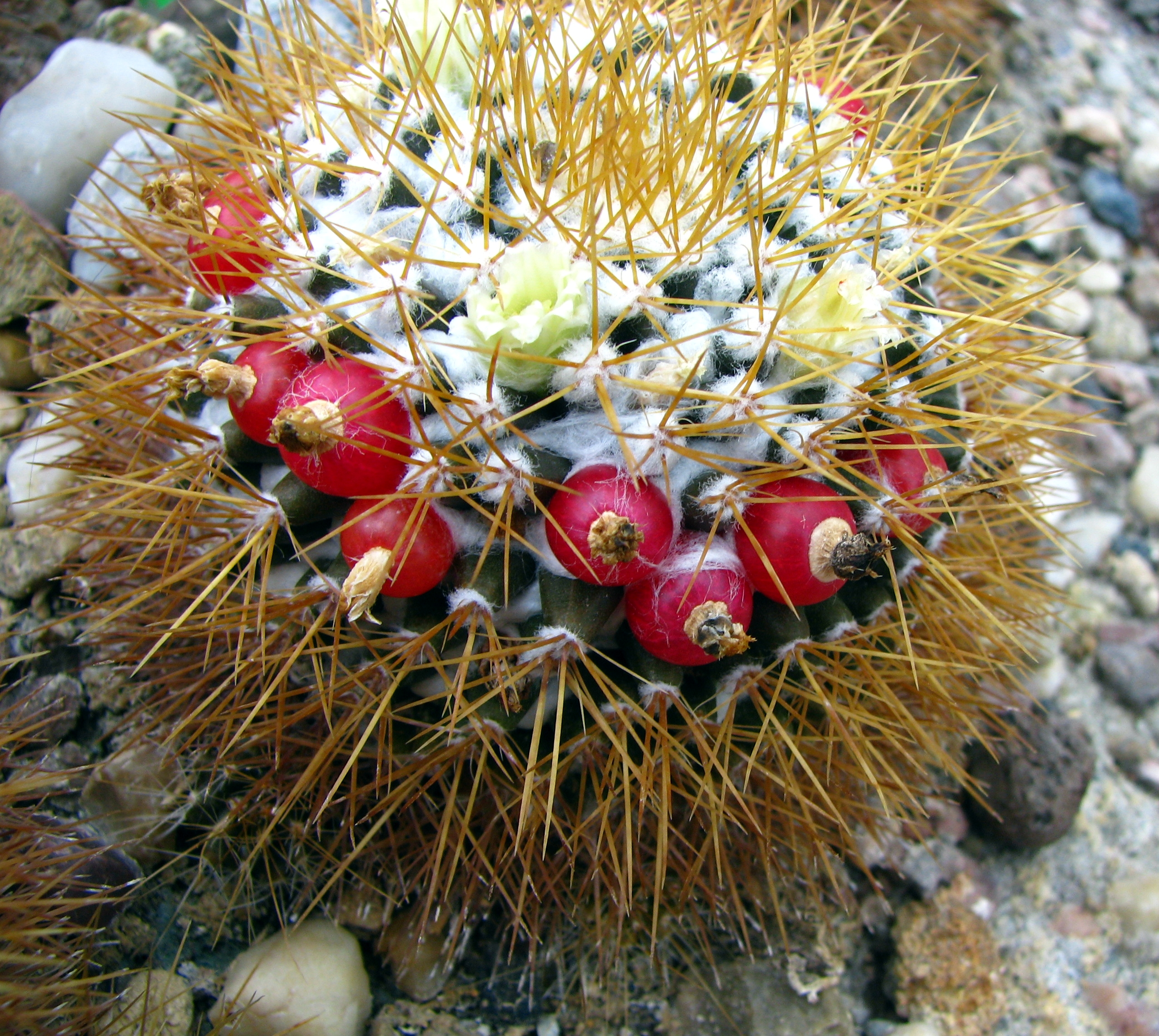

Scientific classification
- Kingdom: Plantae
- Clade: Tracheophytes
- Clade: Angiosperms
- Clade: Eudicots
- Order: Caryophyllales
- Family: Cactaceae
- Subfamily: Cactoideae
- Genus: Mammillaria
- Species: M. nivosa

Binomial name
- Mammillaria nivosa Link ex Pfeiff.

= Mammillaria nivosa =

Species of cactus

Mammillaria nivosa is a species of cactus also known by the name woolly nipple cactus and is native to the Caribbean.

== Description ==
Mammillaria nivosa is radially symmetrical and can grow up to 25 cm (9.8 in) tall. It has spines that can grow to about 38 mm (1.5 in) and often overlap, probably to make it difficult for large organisms to reach the flesh of the cactus.

The plant produces yellow flowers that are approximately 15 mm (0.59 in) long.
