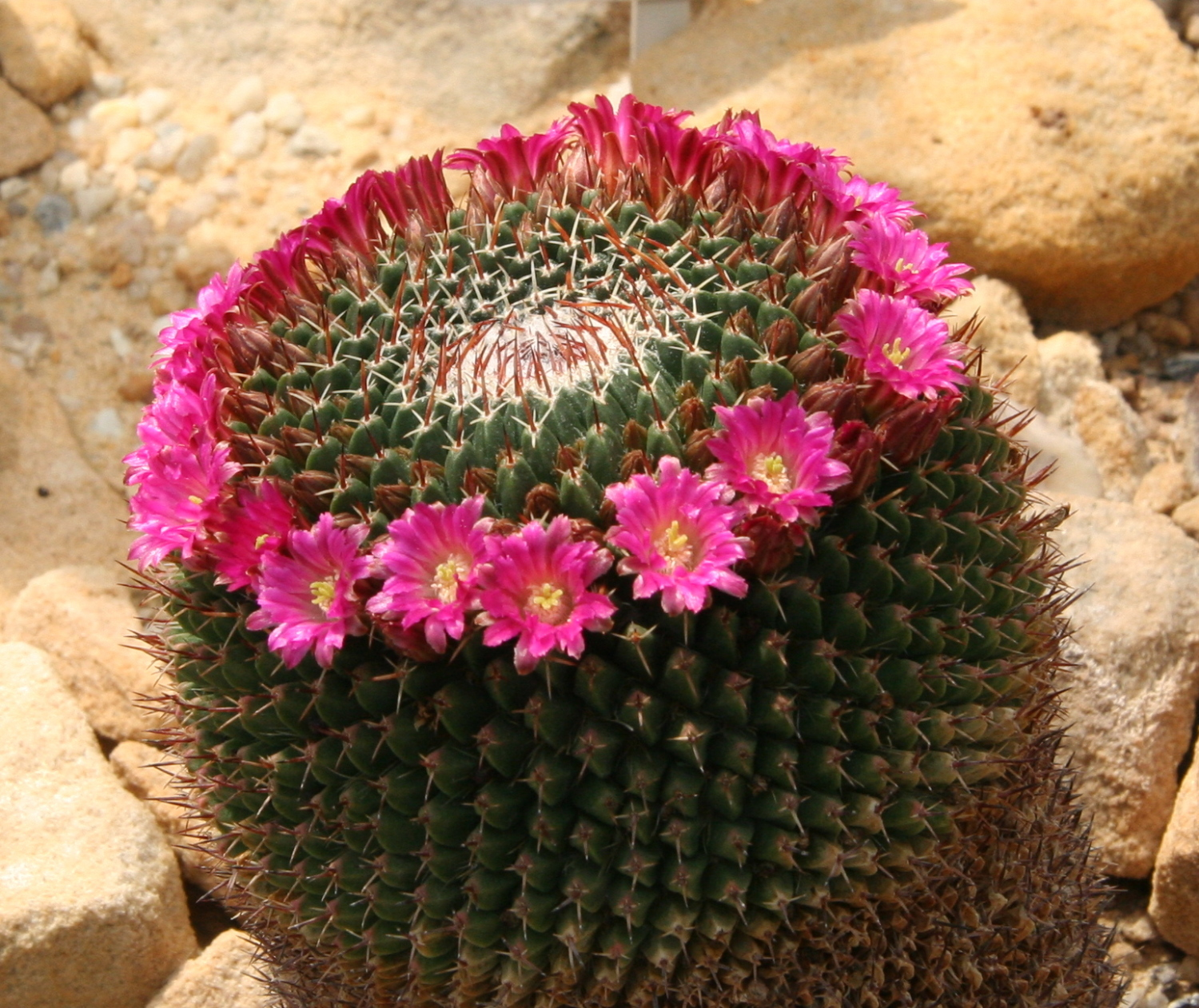

Conservation status
- Least Concern (IUCN 3.1)

Scientific classification
- Kingdom: Plantae
- Clade: Tracheophytes
- Clade: Angiosperms
- Clade: Eudicots
- Order: Caryophyllales
- Family: Cactaceae
- Subfamily: Cactoideae
- Genus: Mammillaria
- Species: M. mystax

Binomial name
- Mammillaria mystax Mart., 1832

Synonyms
- Mammillaria atroflorens Backeb.; Mammillaria casoi Bravo; Mammillaria erythra Repp.; Mammillaria huajuapensis Bravo; Mammillaria mixtecensis Bravo

= Mammillaria mystax =

Species of cactus

Mammillaria mystax is a species of cactus in the subfamily Cactoideae. It is endemic to the Mexican states of Hidalgo, Oaxaca and central Puebla.
