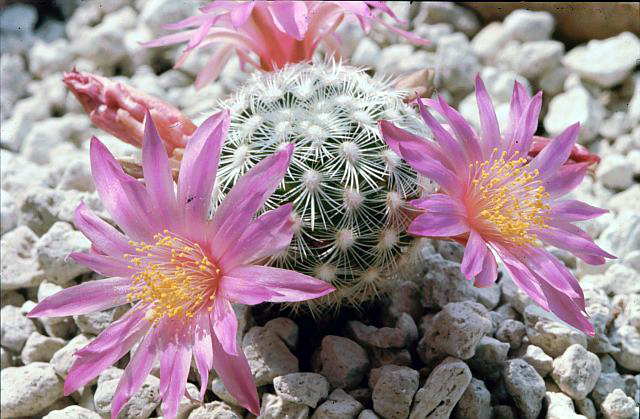

Scientific classification
- Kingdom: Plantae
- Clade: Tracheophytes
- Clade: Angiosperms
- Clade: Eudicots
- Order: Caryophyllales
- Family: Cactaceae
- Subfamily: Cactoideae
- Genus: Mammillaria
- Species: M. deherdtiana

Binomial name
- Mammillaria deherdtiana Farwig, 1969

= Mammillaria deherdtiana =

Species of cactus

Mammillaria deherdtiana is a species of cactus in the subfamily Cactoideae. It is native to South-western Mexico, in particular to Oaxaca, in a region between Nejaba, Juquila, Mixes.
