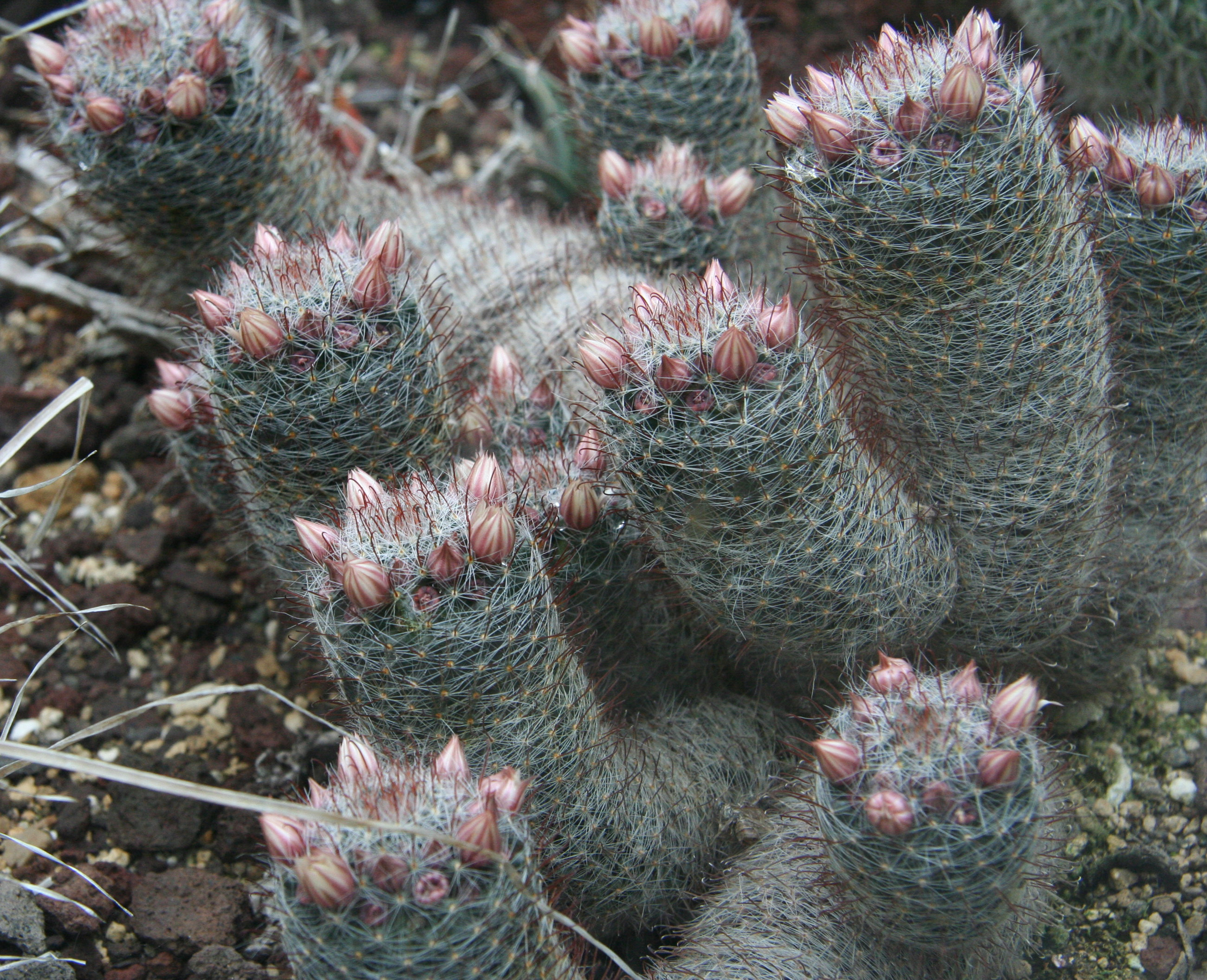

Conservation status
- Critically Endangered (IUCN 3.1)

Scientific classification
- Kingdom: Plantae
- Clade: Tracheophytes
- Clade: Angiosperms
- Clade: Eudicots
- Order: Caryophyllales
- Family: Cactaceae
- Subfamily: Cactoideae
- Genus: Mammillaria
- Species: M. glochidiata

Binomial name
- Mammillaria glochidiata Mart.

= Mammillaria glochidiata =

Species of cactus

Mammillaria glochidiata is a species of plant in the family Cactaceae. It is endemic to Mexico, where it is known from the Barranca de Tolimán in Hidalgo. Its natural habitat is hot deserts. It was classed as Extinct in the wild but since 2013, it has been classed as Critically Endangered by the IUCN Red List.
