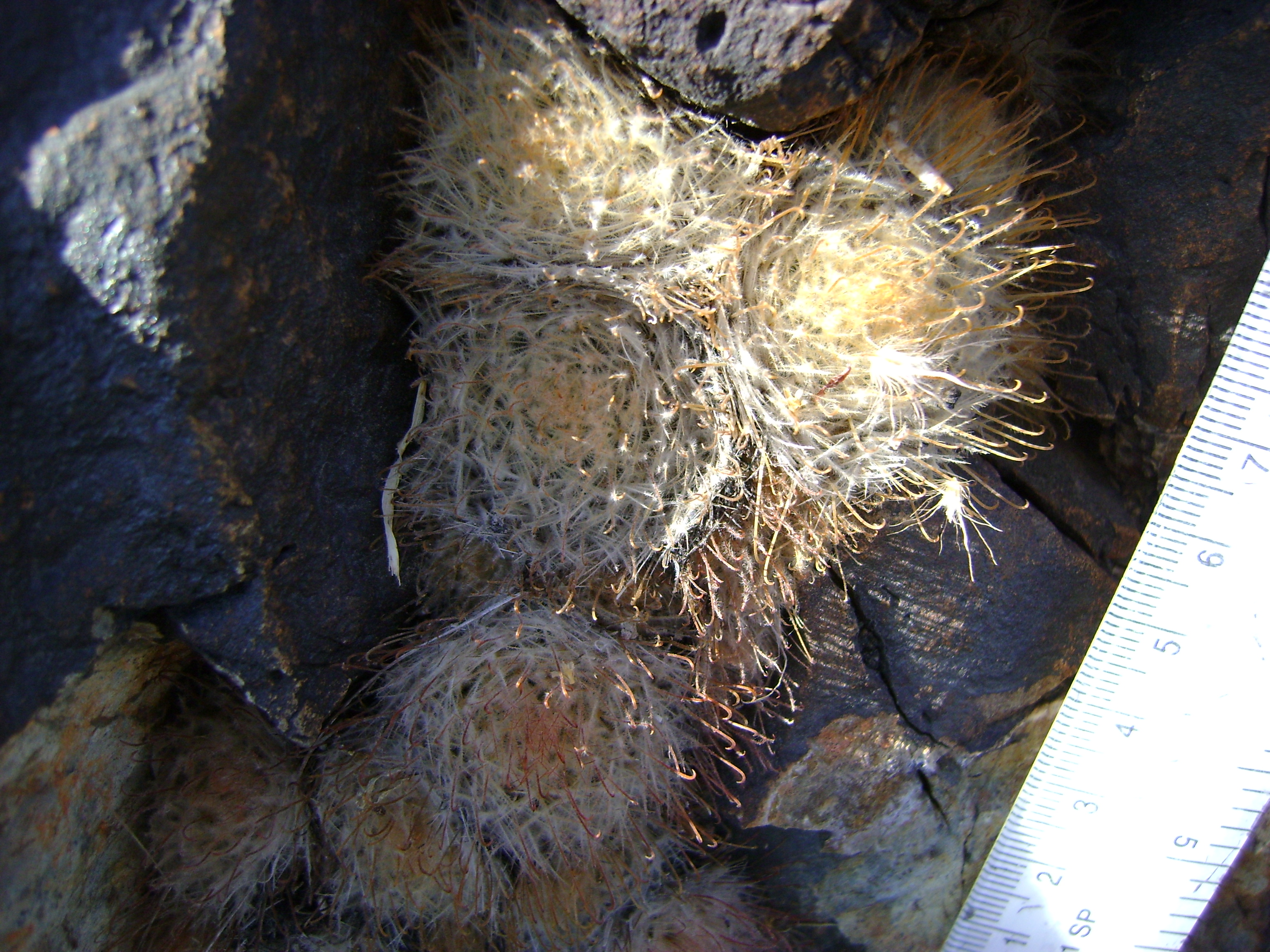

Conservation status
- Critically Endangered (IUCN 3.1)

Scientific classification
- Kingdom: Plantae
- Clade: Tracheophytes
- Clade: Angiosperms
- Clade: Eudicots
- Order: Caryophyllales
- Family: Cactaceae
- Subfamily: Cactoideae
- Genus: Mammillaria
- Species: M. pennispinosa

Binomial name
- Mammillaria pennispinosa Krainz

= Mammillaria pennispinosa =

Species of cactus

Mammillaria pennispinosa is a species of cactus. It is endemic to Mexico, where it is known only from a single location in Durango. Its total population is fewer than 1250 individuals. They grow on volcanic rock in desert habitat.
