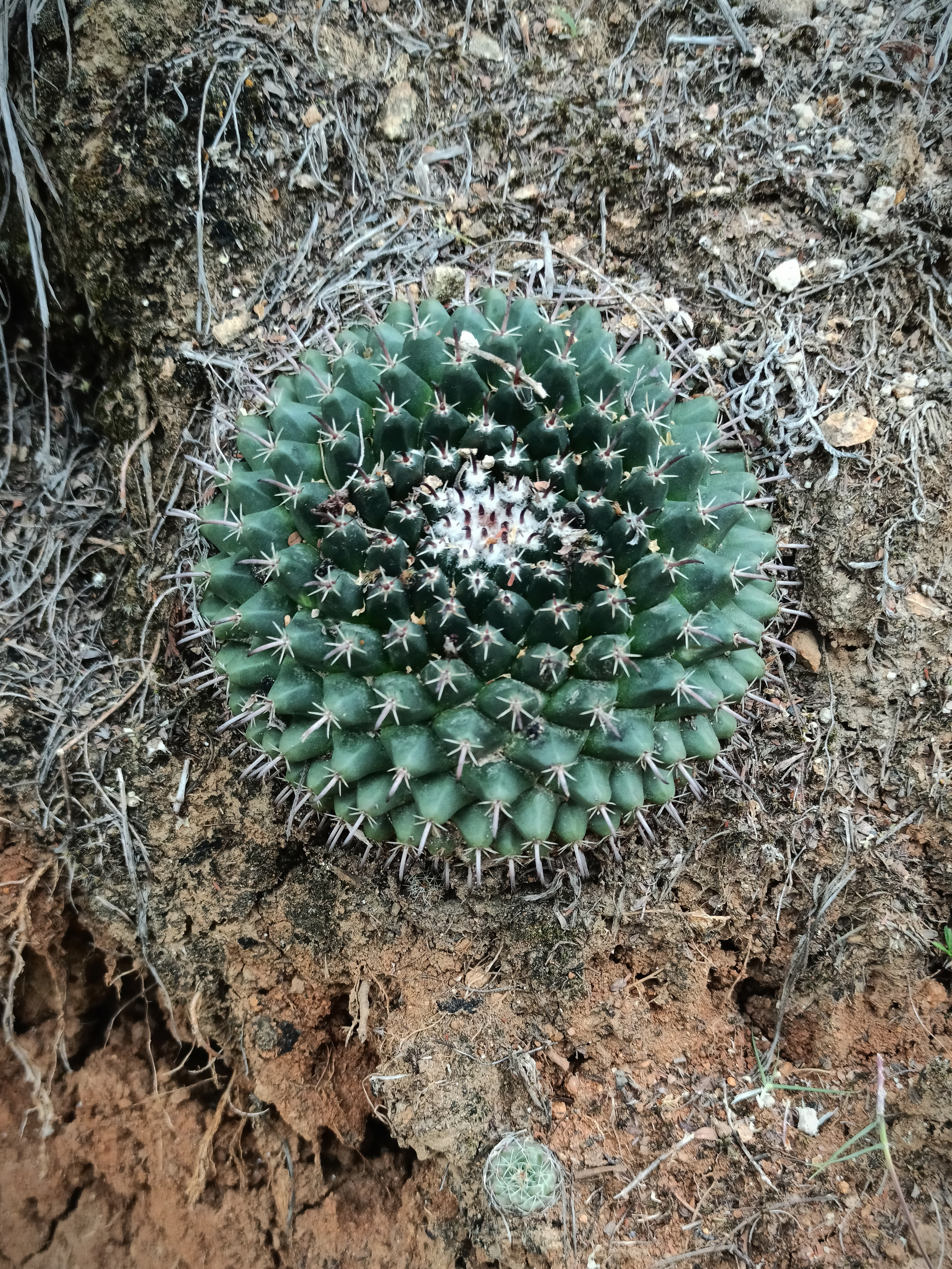

Conservation status
- Least Concern (IUCN 3.1)

Scientific classification
- Kingdom: Plantae
- Clade: Tracheophytes
- Clade: Angiosperms
- Clade: Eudicots
- Order: Caryophyllales
- Family: Cactaceae
- Subfamily: Cactoideae
- Genus: Mammillaria
- Species: M. uncinata

Binomial name
- Mammillaria uncinata Zucc. ex Pfeiff., 1837
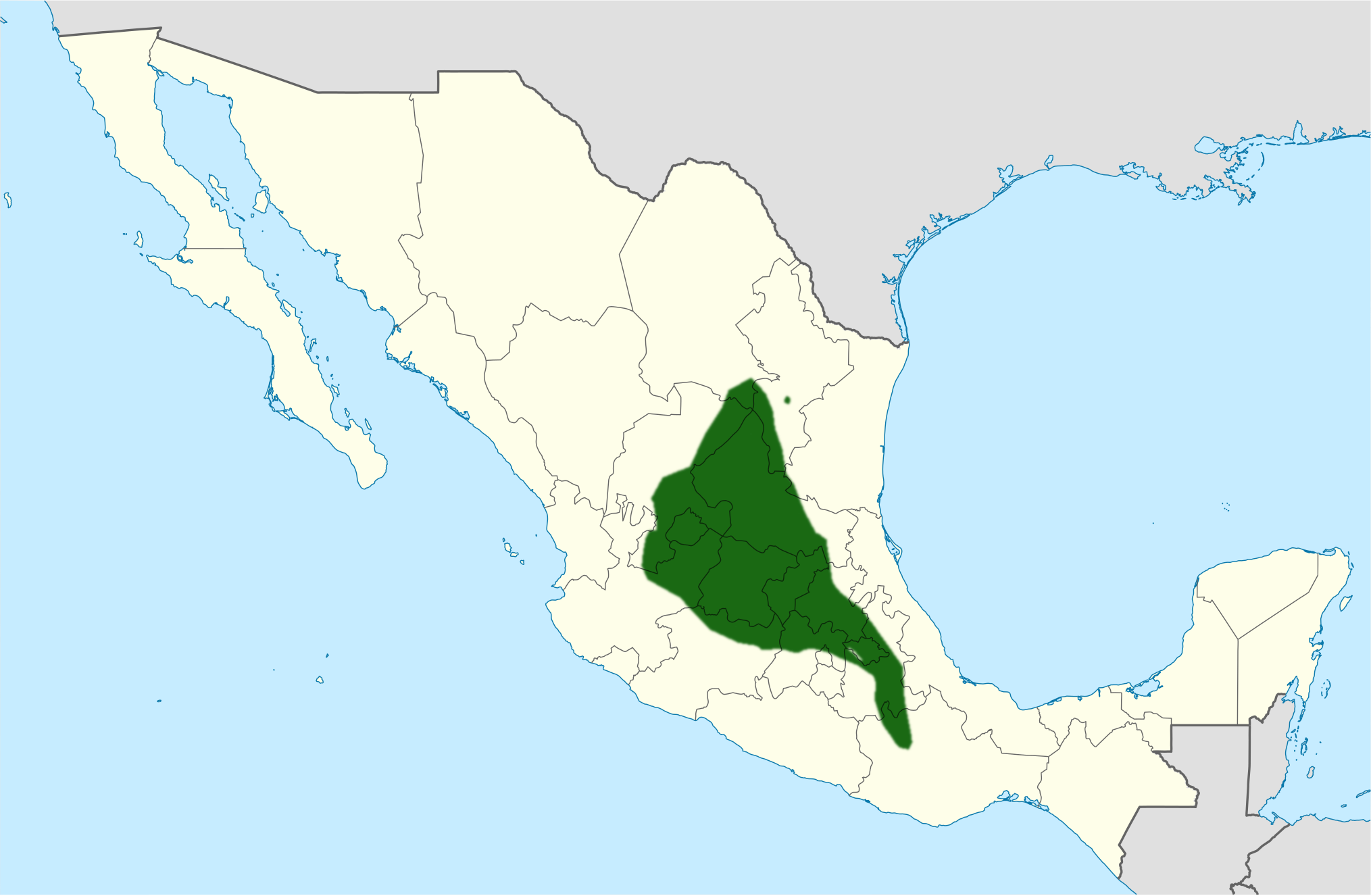

Synonyms
- Cactus uncinatus (Zucc. ex Pfeiff.) Kuntze 1891; Neomammillaria uncinata (Zucc. ex Pfeiff.) Britton & Rose 1923; Cactus bihamatus (Pfeiff.) Kuntze 1891; Cactus depressus Kuntze 1891; Mammillaria adunca Scheidw. ex C.F.Först. 1846; Mammillaria bihamata Pfeiff. 1838; Mammillaria depressa Scheidw. 1838), nom. illeg; Mammillaria lloydii (Britton & Rose) Orcutt 1926; Mammillaria uncinata var. bihamata (Pfeiff.) Backeb. 1961; Mammillaria uncinata var. biuncinata Lem. 1839; Mammillaria uncinata var. rhodantha A.Dietr. 1850; Mammillaria uncinata var. spinosior Lem. 1839; Neomammillaria lloydii Britton & Rose 1923

= Mammillaria uncinata =

Species of cactus

Mammillaria uncinata is a species of cactus in the family Cactaceae. It is endemic to Mexico.

== Description ==
Mammillaria uncinata typically grows alone, but can also form clusters. Its flattened, spherical to globular shoots are dark blue-green in color, measuring 6 to 10 cm (2.4 to 3.9 in) in height and 8 to 10 cm (3.1 to 3.9 in) in diameter. The plant features firm, pyramidal tubercles that are angular at the base and exude a milky sap. The axils of the tubercles are initially covered with wool, which later becomes bare.

The cactus has a central spine that is pinkish-gray to dark purple-brown, with a dark tip, and can be up to 1 cm (0.39 in) long. It also has 3 to 6 radial spines that are straight or slightly curved; the uppermost ones are shorter and stronger. These radial spines are pinkish to grayish-white and measure about 5 to 6 mm (0.20 to 0.24 in) in length.

The flowers are yellowish or white with a reddish-brown central stripe. They are 1.5 to 2 cm (0.59 to 0.79 in) long and up to 1.5 cm (0.59 in) in diameter. The fruits are club-shaped, purple-red, and grow up to 1.8 cm (0.71 in) long. They contain brown seeds.

== Distribution ==
Mammillaria uncinata is a cactus species native to several Mexican states, including Hidalgo, San Luis Potosí, Mexico, Morelos, Puebla, Oaxaca, Guerrero, Durango, Querétaro, Aguascalientes, Michoacán, and Jalisco at elevations between 1,500–2,800 m (4,900–9,200 ft).

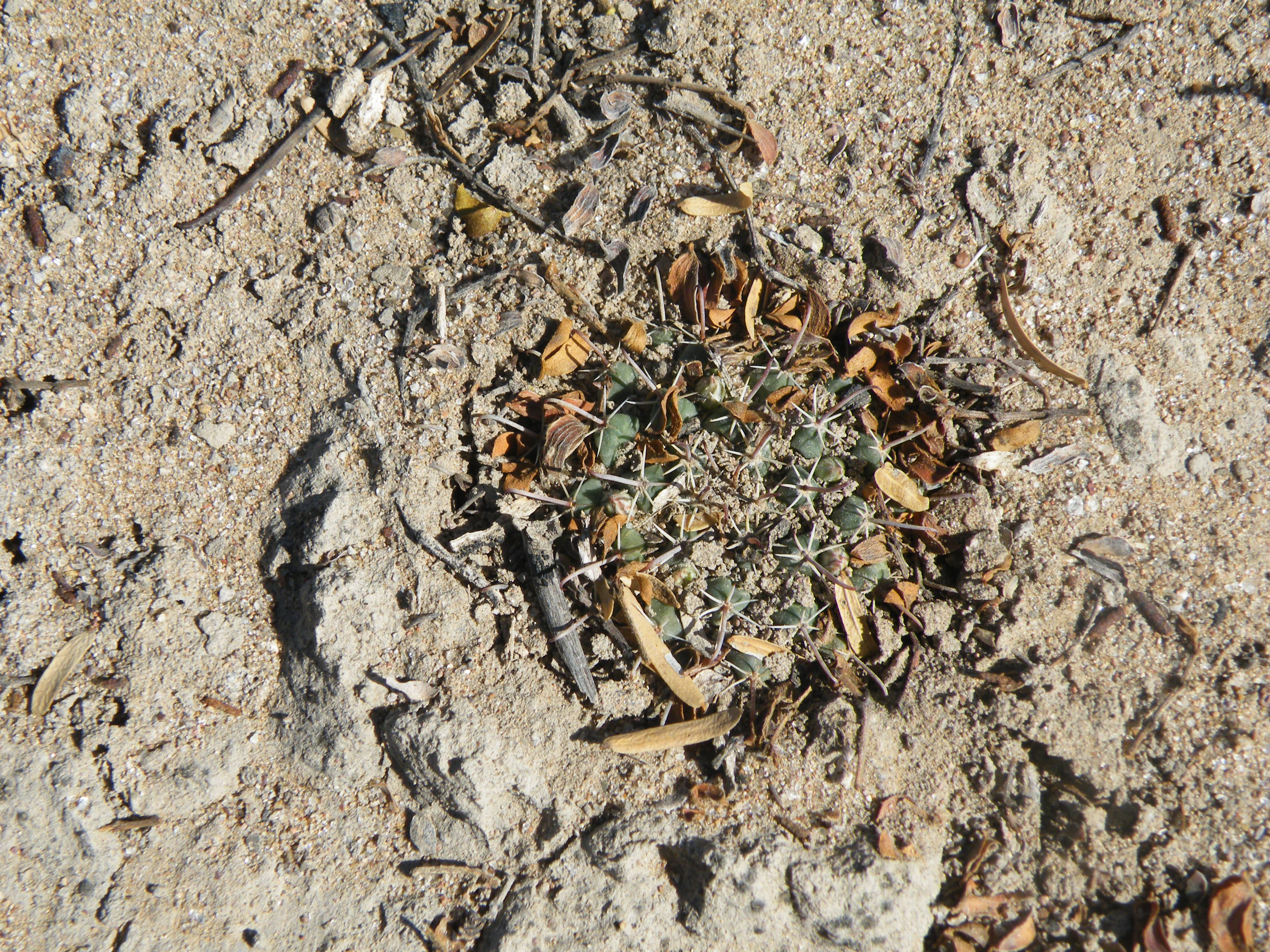
Plant in habitat near Cerritos, San Luis Potosí

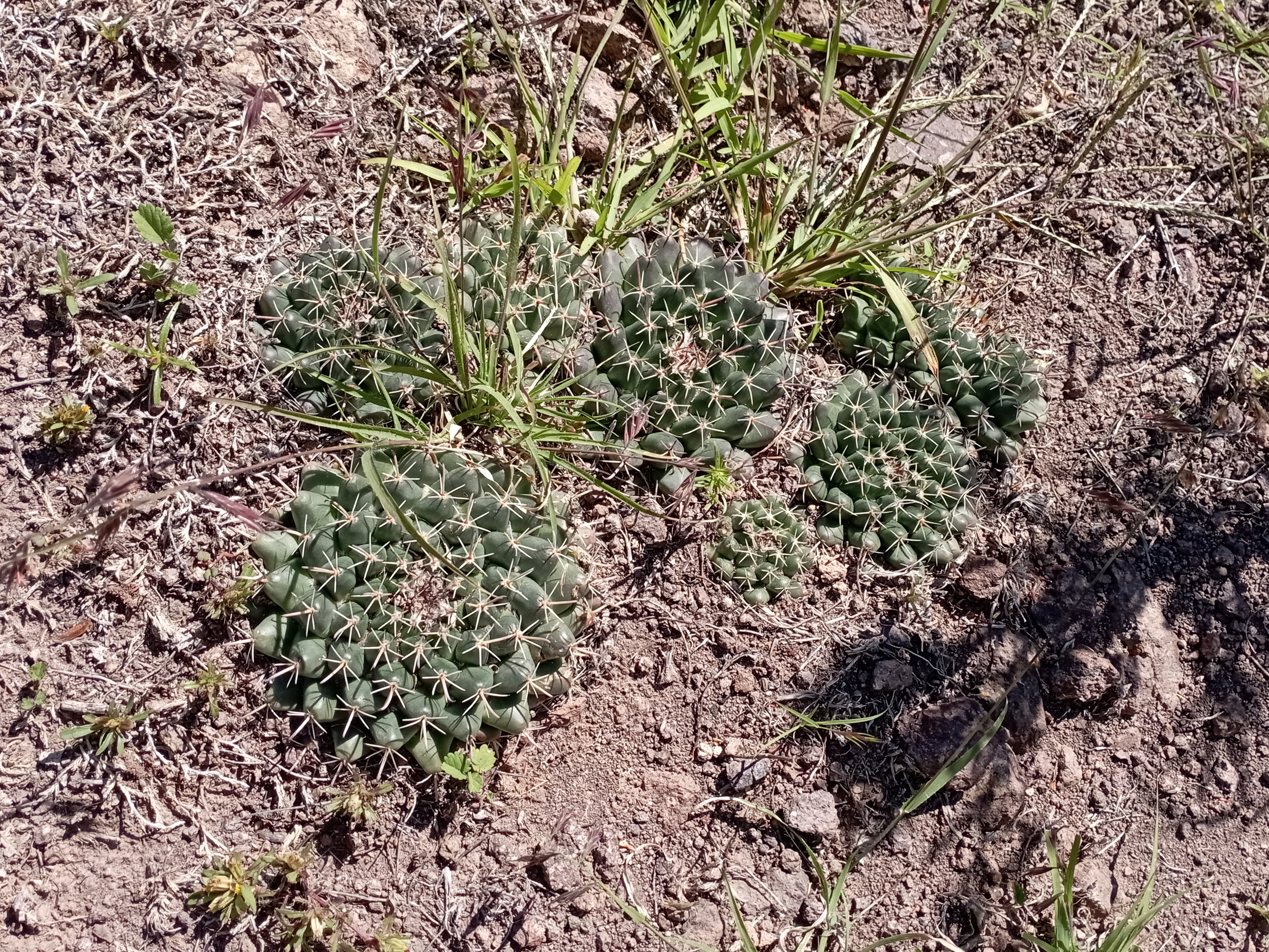
Habitat in Dolores, Hidalgo

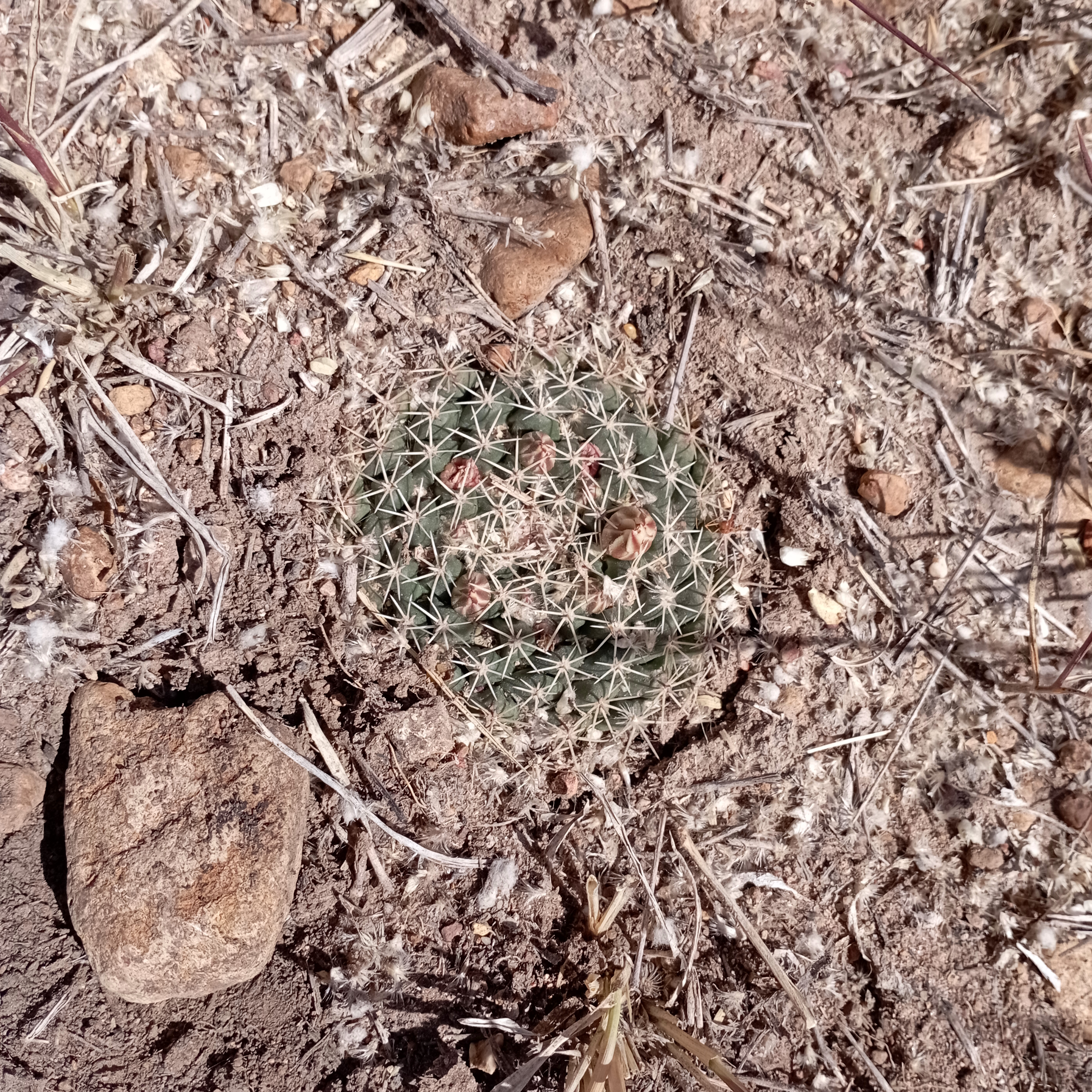
Habitat in Dolores, Hidalgo

== Taxonomy ==
This species was first described in 1837 by Ludwig Karl Georg Pfeiffer. The name "uncinata" refers to the shape of its spines, meaning 'hooked' or 'hook-shaped'.
