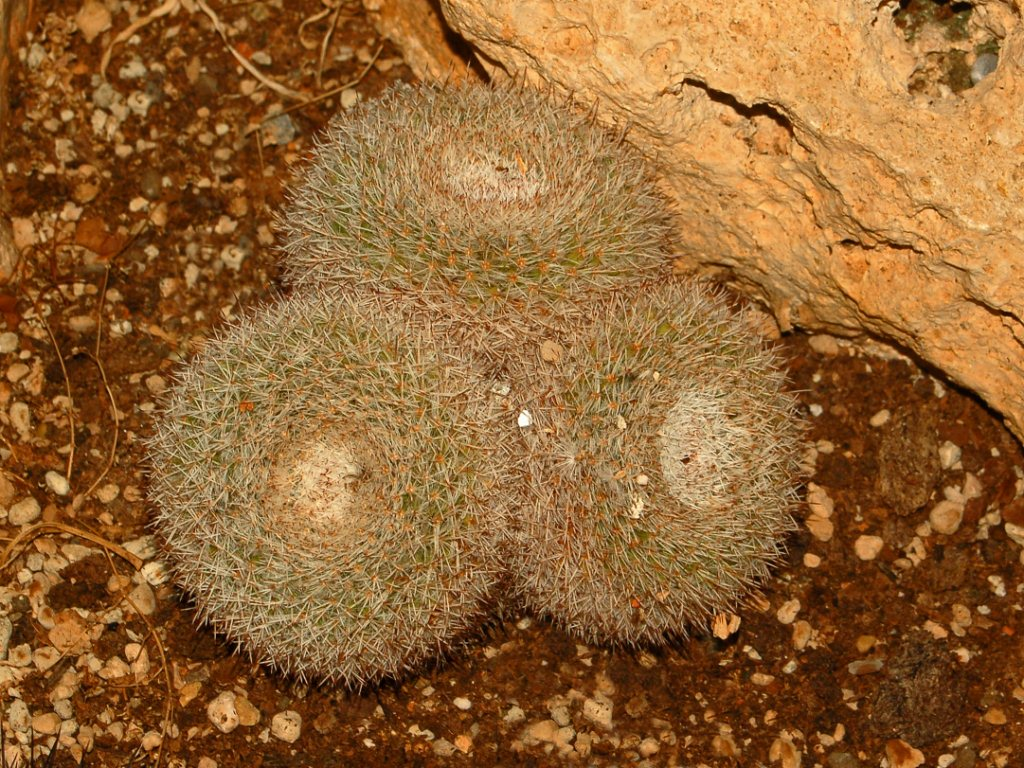
- Mammiliaria morganiana at the botanical garden of Villa Durazzo-Pallavicini, Genova Pegli

Scientific classification
- Kingdom: Plantae
- Clade: Tracheophytes
- Clade: Angiosperms
- Clade: Eudicots
- Order: Caryophyllales
- Family: Cactaceae
- Subfamily: Cactoideae
- Genus: Mammillaria
- Species: M. morganiana

Binomial name
- Mammillaria morganiana Tiegel

= Mammillaria morganiana =

Species of cactus

Mammillaria morganiana, common name owl's eyes or owl-eye pincushion, is a cactus in the genus Mammillaria of the family Cactaceae. The epithet morganiana honors the U.S. optometrist Meredith Walter Morgan (1887-1957) of Richmond.

== Description ==
Mammillaria morganiana is a spherical or slightly cylindrical cactus, reaching a diameter of about 8 inches. This plant is pale blue-green, densely covered by woolly whitish tubercles. The 4-5 central spines are straight, about 1 foot long, while the 40 to 50 radial spines are very thin or hairlike and reach about 1.2 inches. The funnel-shaped flowers are creamy white to pink, with central red venation, about 1.5 inches long and wide. The red-brown fruits contain the seeds.

== Distribution ==
This species is native to the Mexican state of Guanajuato.

== Habitat ==
It can be found in semi-desert warm area at an elevation of 1,400–1,700 metres (4,600–5,600 ft) above sea level.
