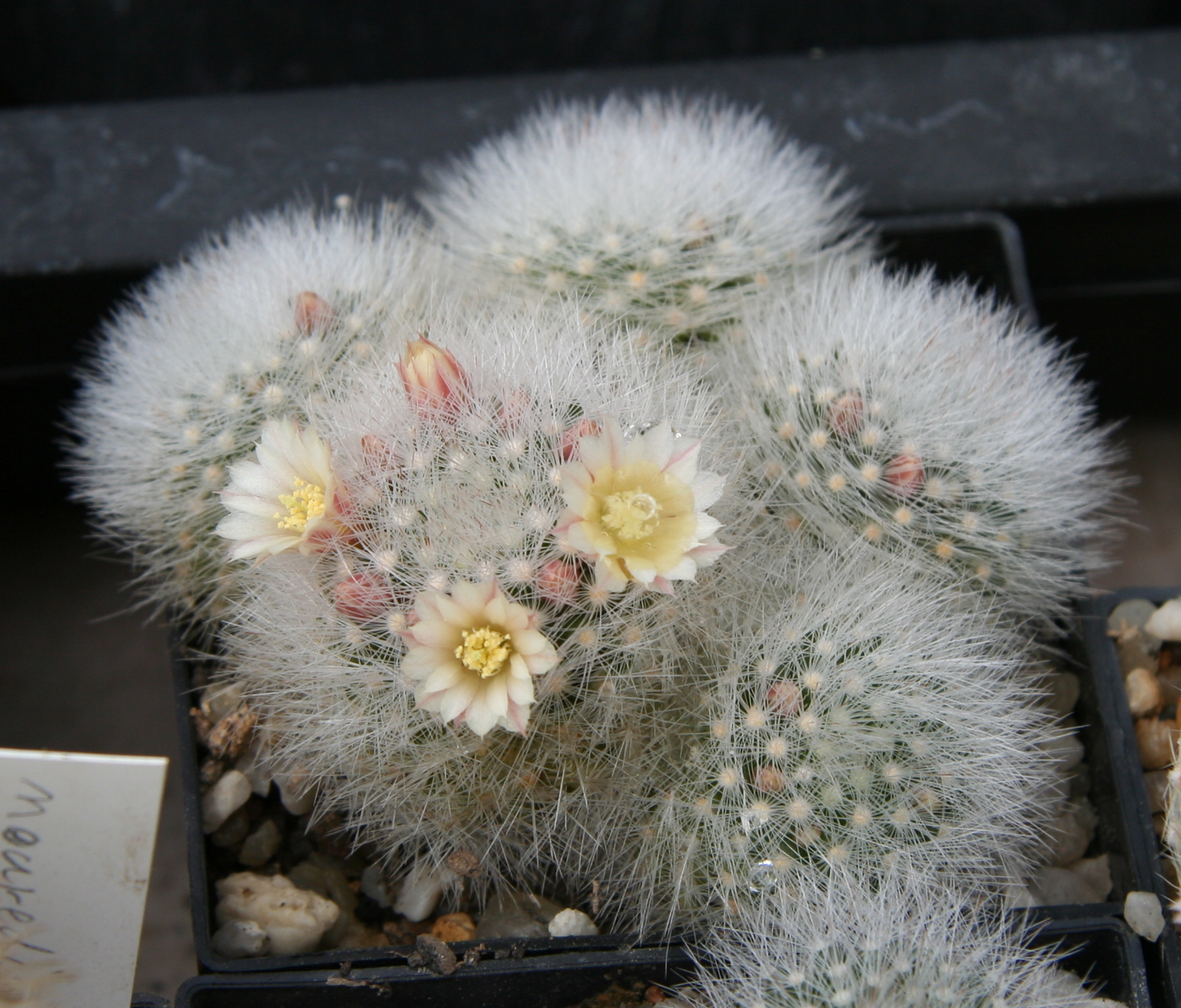

Conservation status
- Critically Endangered (IUCN 3.1)

Scientific classification
- Kingdom: Plantae
- Clade: Tracheophytes
- Clade: Angiosperms
- Clade: Eudicots
- Order: Caryophyllales
- Family: Cactaceae
- Subfamily: Cactoideae
- Genus: Mammillaria
- Species: M. schwarzii

Binomial name
- Mammillaria schwarzii Shurly

Synonyms
- Krainzia schwarzii (Shurly) Doweld

= Mammillaria schwarzii =

Species of cactus

Mammillaria schwarzii is a species of plant in the family Cactaceae. It is a succulent cactus subshrub endemic to Guanajuato state in Mexico. It is native to semi-desert matorral (scrubland) and oak woodland from 2,150 to 2,400 meters elevation, where grows on steep igneous rock faces.

Thought to be extinct for some time, it was rediscovered in 1987.
