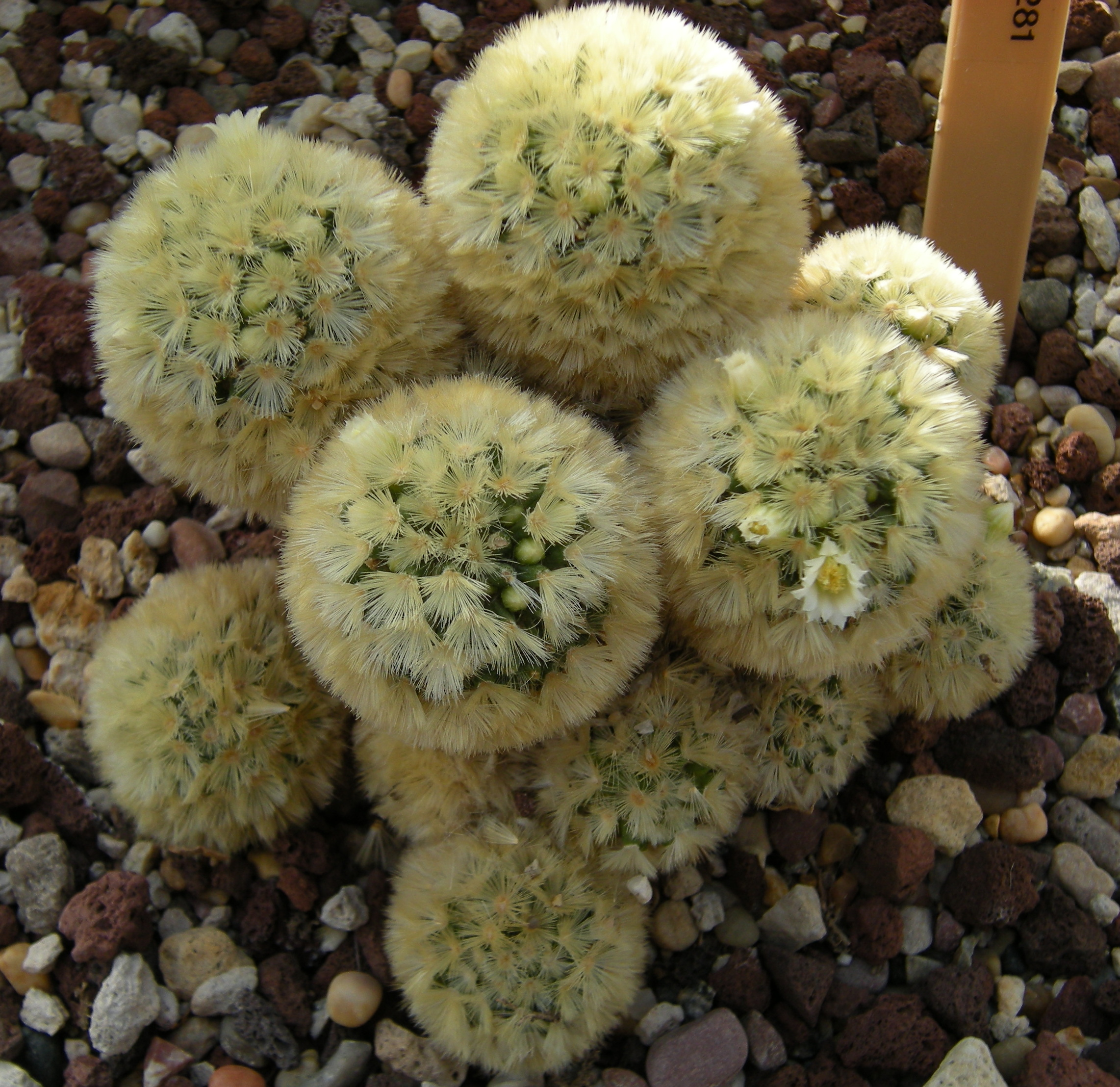
- M. carmenae, Volunteer Park Conservatory, Seattle

Scientific classification
- Kingdom: Plantae
- Clade: Tracheophytes
- Clade: Angiosperms
- Clade: Eudicots
- Order: Caryophyllales
- Family: Cactaceae
- Subfamily: Cactoideae
- Genus: Mammillaria
- Species: M. carmenae

Binomial name
- Mammillaria carmenae Castañeda (1953)

= Mammillaria carmenae =

Species of cactus

Mammillaria carmenae, the Isla Carmen pincushion cactus, is a species of flowering plant in the family Cactaceae.

It is native to Tamaulipas state, in eastern central Mexico.

It grows to 8 cm (3 in) tall by 15 cm (6 in) broad. The clustered egg-shaped stems, 3–4 cm thick, are covered in creamy-coloured yellow down and bristles. In spring they bear pale cream or pink-tinged flowers with yellow centres.

== Taxonomy ==
Mammillaria carmenae was named by Marcelino Castañeda y Nuñez de Caceres in 1953, after his second wife, Carmen Gonzales-Castaneda.

== Cultivation ==
Mammillaria carmenae is one of several Mammillaria species to be cultivated. In temperate regions it must be grown under glass with heat. It has gained the Royal Horticultural Society's Award of Garden Merit.
