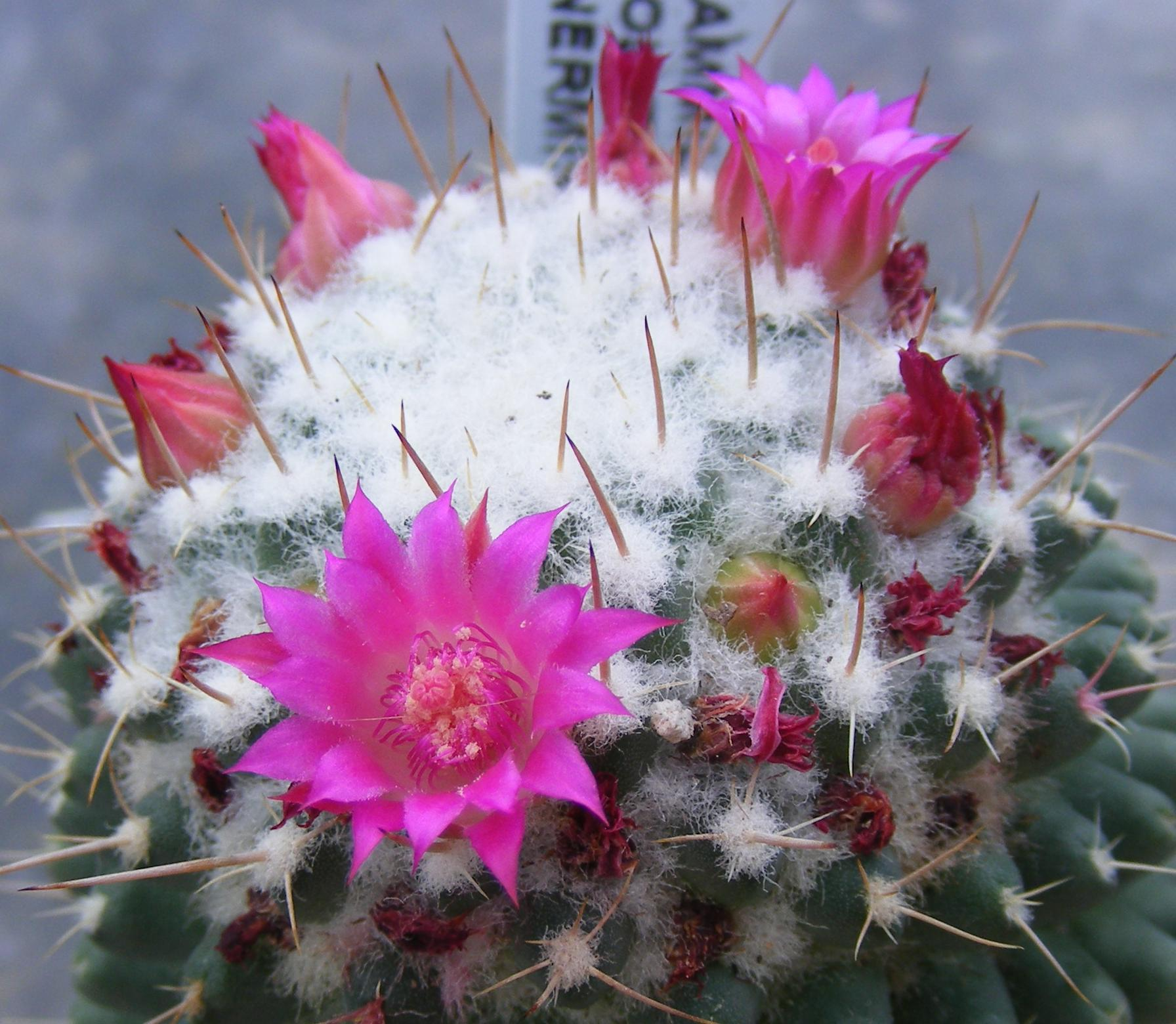

Conservation status
- Least Concern (IUCN 3.1)

Scientific classification
- Kingdom: Plantae
- Clade: Tracheophytes
- Clade: Angiosperms
- Clade: Eudicots
- Order: Caryophyllales
- Family: Cactaceae
- Subfamily: Cactoideae
- Genus: Mammillaria
- Species: M. polythele

Binomial name
- Mammillaria polythele Mart.

= Mammillaria polythele =

Species of cactus

Mammillaria polythele is a cactus in the genus Mammillaria, native to Mexico.

Solitary plants are cylindrical, with erect stem to about 24 inches (61 centimeter) high and 3 to 4 inches (7.6 to 10.16 centimeter) in diameter. The color is dark green to blue green.
