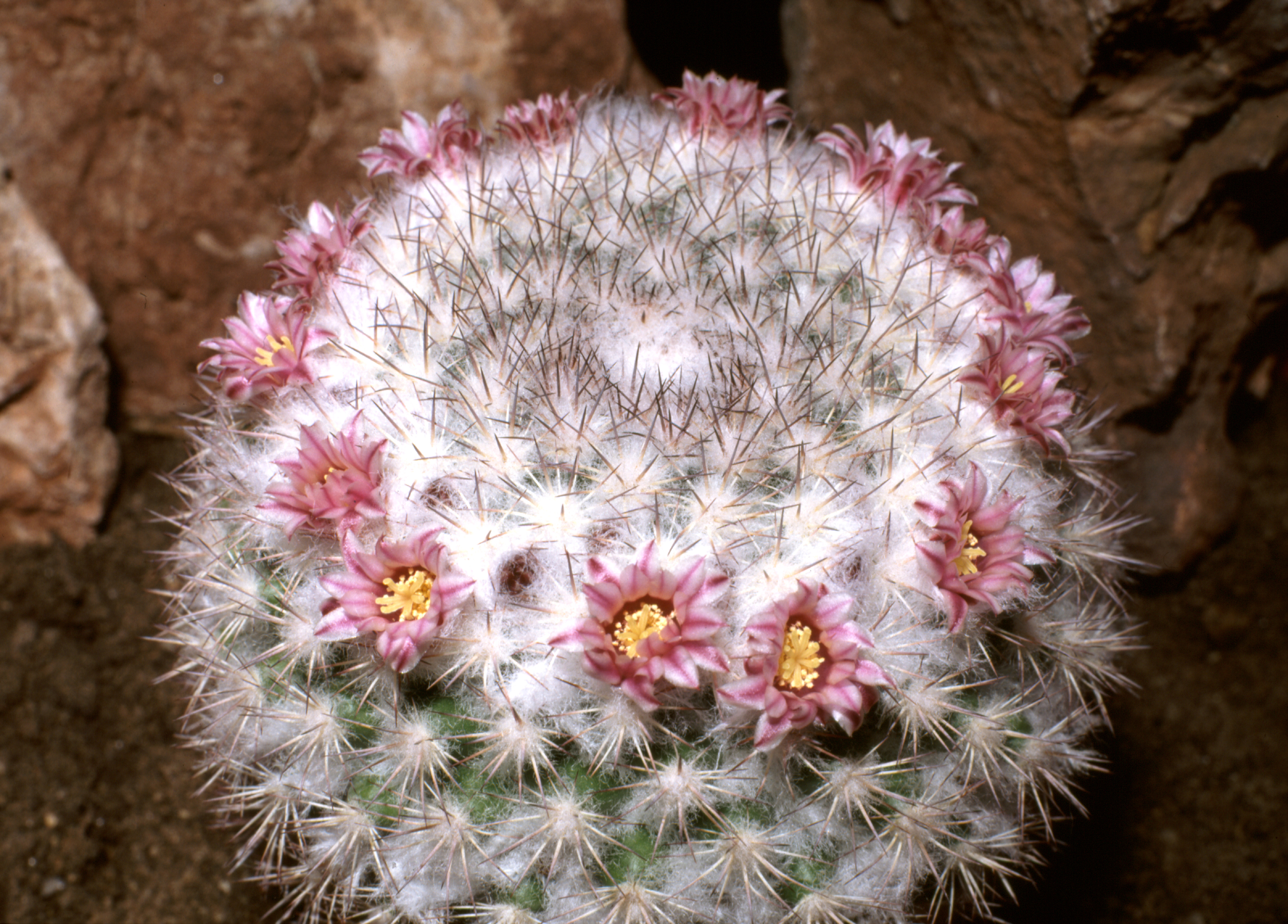
- Mammillaria tayloriorum

Scientific classification
- Kingdom: Plantae
- Clade: Tracheophytes
- Clade: Angiosperms
- Clade: Eudicots
- Order: Caryophyllales
- Family: Cactaceae
- Subfamily: Cactoideae
- Tribe: Cacteae
- Genus: Mammillaria; Haw., nom. cons.

Species
- About 144 species: see text

Synonyms
- Cactus L.; Cryptocaryocactus Guiggi; Dolichothele (K.Schum.) Britton & Rose; Ebnerella Buxb.; Escobariopsis Doweld; Haagea Fric; Krainzia Backeb.; Lactomammillaria Fric (nom. inval.); Leptocladia Buxb.; Leptocladodia Buxb.; Mamillaria F.Rchb. (orth. var.); Mamillopsis (E.Morren) F.A.C.Weber ex Britton & Rose; Mammariella Shafer (nom. inval.); Mammilaria Torr. & A.Gray (orth. var.); Neomammillaria Britton & Rose; Melocactus Boehm. (not to be confused with the accepted genus Melocactus Link & Otto); Porfiria Boed.; Pseudomammillaria Buxb.; Solisia Britton & Rose

= Mammillaria =

Genus of cactus mostly from Mexico

Mammillaria is one of the largest genera in the cactus family (Cactaceae), with currently about 144 accepted species and around 99 subspecies. The majority of these species are native to Mexico, while some are found in the Southwestern United States, the Caribbean, Colombia, Guatemala, Honduras and Venezuela. The common name "pincushion cactus" refers to this genus and the closely related Escobaria.

The first species was described by Carl Linnaeus as Cactus mammillaris in 1753, deriving its name from the Latin mammilla, (meaning "nipple"), referring to the tubercles that are among the distinctive features of the genus. Numerous species are commonly known as globe cactus, nipple cactus, birthday cake cactus, fishhook cactus or pincushion cactus (though such terms are also commonly used for related taxa, such as Pelecyphora or Ferocactus).

== Description ==
The distinctive feature of the genus is the possession of an areole split into two clearly separated parts, one occurring at the apex of the tubercle, the other at its base. The apex part is spine-bearing, and the base part is always spineless, but usually bears some bristles or wool. The base part of the areole bears the flowers and fruits, and is a branching point. The apex part of the areole does not carry flowers, but in certain conditions can function as a branching point as well.

The plants are usually small, globose to elongated, the stems from 1 to 20 centimetres (1/2 to 7 3/4 inches) in diameter and from 1 to 40 cm (1/2 to 15 3/4 in) tall, clearly tuberculate, solitary to clumping forming mounds of up to 100 heads and with radial symmetry. Tubercles can be conical, cylindrical, pyramidal or round. The roots are fibrous, fleshy or tuberous. The flowers are funnel-shaped and range from 7 to 40 millimetres (1/4 to 1 1/2 in) and more in length and in diameter, from white and greenish to yellow, pink and red in colour, often with a darker mid-stripe; the reddish hues are due to betalain pigments as usual for Caryophyllales. The fruit is berry-like, club-shaped or elongated, usually red but sometimes white, magenta, yellow or green. Some species have the fruit embedded into the plant body (cryptocarpic). The seeds are black or brown, ranging from 1 to 3 mm (1/16 to 1/8 in) in size. Many species exude a milky latex when injured.

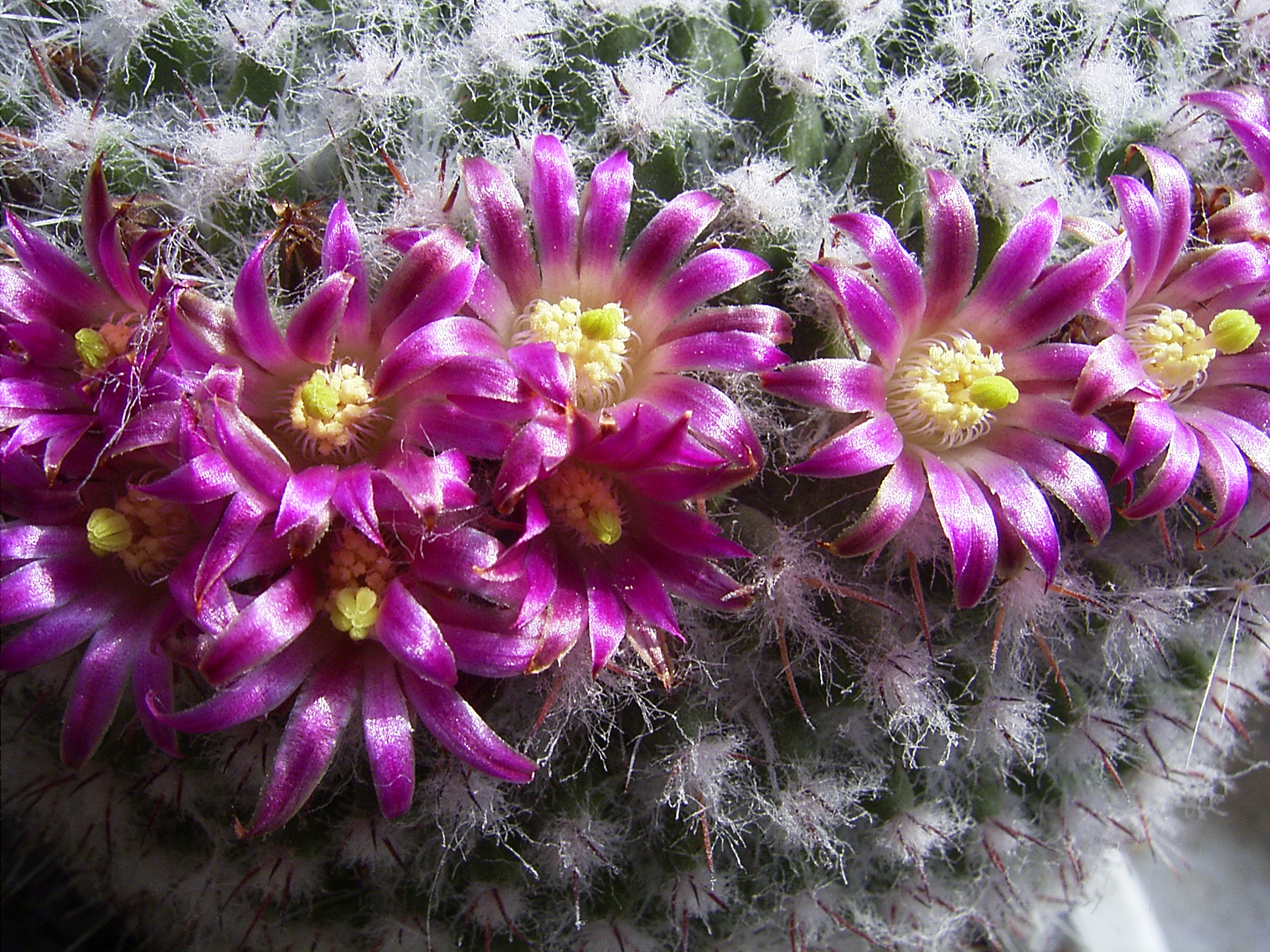

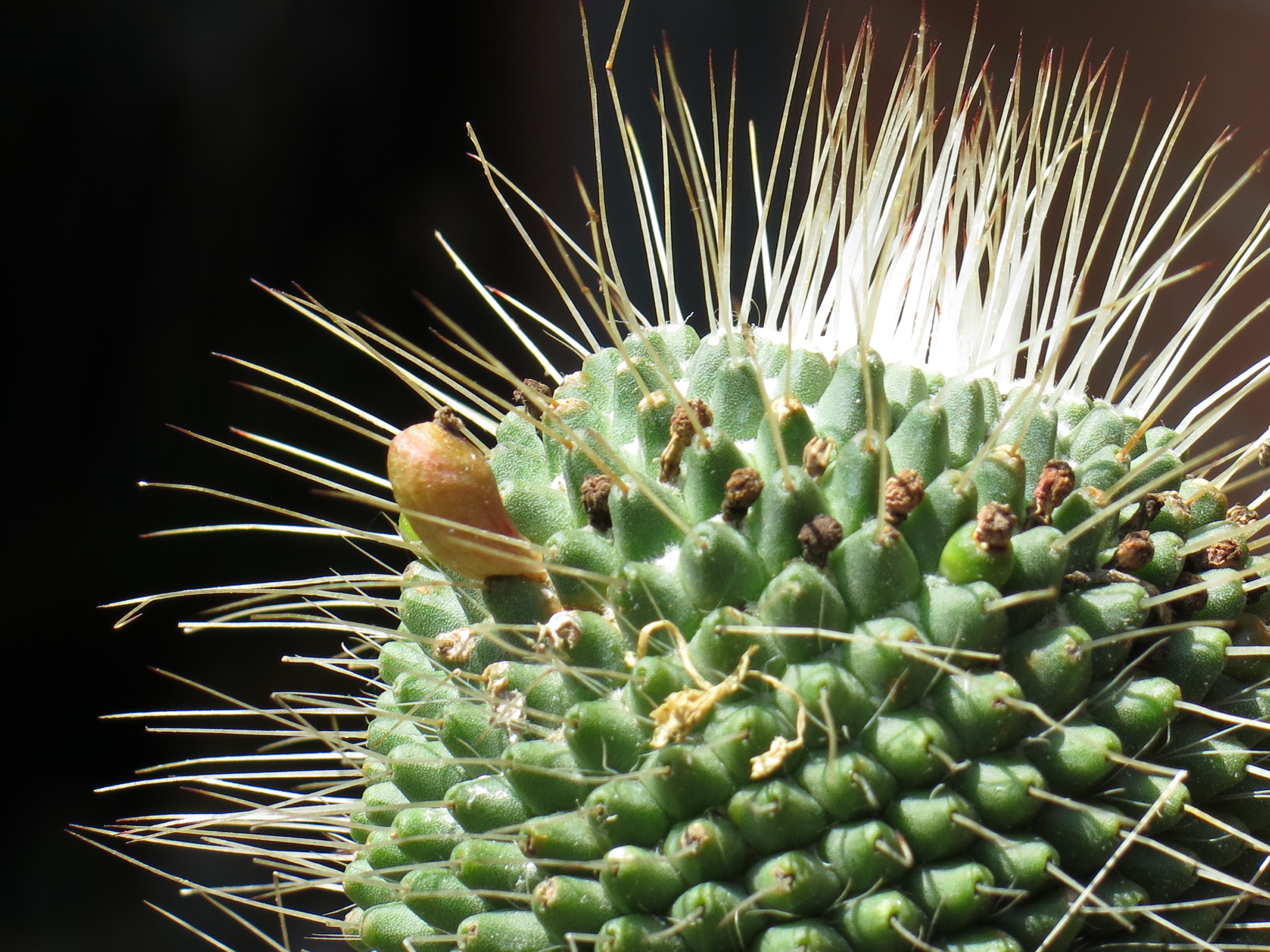
Detail of cactus with fruit

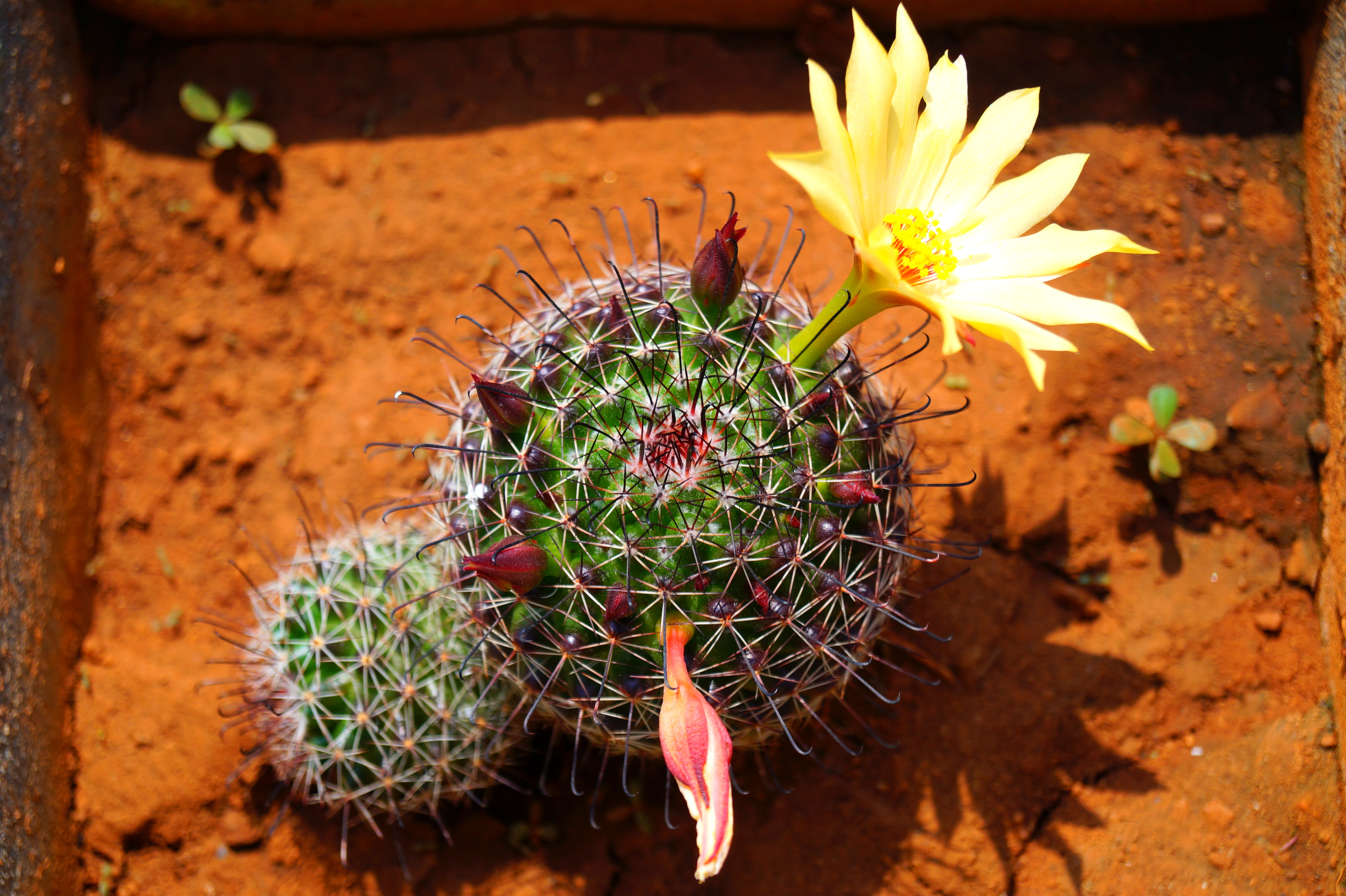
Fish hook cactus (Mammillaria beneckei var. balsasoides)

== Taxonomy ==
The genus Mammillaria in the family Cactaceae was proposed by Adrian Hardy Haworth in 1812. Initial spellings varied between authors, but Mammillaria is now recognized as the accepted spelling. The first species in the genus was described by Carl Linnaeus in 1753 as Cactus mammillaris (now Mammillaria mammillaris). The name Cactus became so confused that the 1905 Vienna botanical congress rejected Cactus as a genus name, and conserved Mammillaria.

Mammillaria is a large and diverse genus with many species often exhibiting variations due to the nature of terrain, weather, soil and other ecological factors. As a result, subdivisions within the species has been rather inconsistent over time. Initially, some investigators were more inclined to consider each variation as a unique species, creating confusion and long synonymy-lists for some of the species. Over time, new investigators began grouping closely related forms under the same name to attempt to more accurately define the species.

Several systems for classification began to emerge. The first of note, created by Schumann and modified by Berger, divided the species into ten named groups. However, the criteria for these divisions was somewhat indefinite and flexible. In the early 1923, cactologists Nathaniel Lord Britton and Joseph Nelson Rose developed the Britton & Rose system which arranged the classification characteristics in a system of keys with tangible separation factors, resulting in a much more workable system of identification.

Later classification was performed by the cactus specialists Hunt, Reppenhagen and Lüthy, with much work focusing on researching the meanings and value of the original plant descriptions, synchronizing them with modern taxonomic requirements and studying the morphology of plants and seeds, as well as ecological aspects of the genus. These works helped to expand the understanding of Mammillaria taxa.

Currently the classification of Mammillaria is in a state where few newly discovered species are likely, though some new species may yet be found when the chaos of names created earlier by commercial plant collectors is resolved. Many names that were introduced for plants barely differentiated by a shade of flower colour or variation in spination were eliminated in attempt to make the use of names consistent with the rest of the botanical world. The number of taxa, which at one time numbered above 500, is now below 200. Some genera (Dolichothele, Mammillopsis, Krainzia, and others) have been merged back into Mammillaria, and others like Coryphantha and Pelecyphora were confirmed as separate.

Intense studies of DNA of the genus are being conducted. Based on DNA research results, the genus does not seem to be monophyletic and is likely to be split into two large genera, one of them possibly including certain species of other closely related genera like Coryphantha, Ortegocactus, and Neolloydia.

=== Species ===
As of November 2026, Plants of the World Online accepted the following 144 species and 1 natural hybrid:

When distribution information from Plants of the World Online is insufficiently specific (for example, "NE Mexico" as opposed to "Nuevo León"), distribution information from Das Große Kakteen-Lexikon (2012) by Edward F. Anderson will be used instead or in addition if the species in question is represented within that book. This information is also cross-referenced with iNaturalist, GBIF, or IUCN data in case of conflict, vagueness, or inaccuracy.

Common names are taken from iNaturalist.

Image	Scientific name	Common name	Native range
	Mammillaria albicoma Boed.		NE and N Central Mexico (S Nuevo León, SW Tamaulipas, N Central San Luis Potosí)
	Mammillaria albiflora (Werderm.) Backeb.		C Mexico (NE Guanajuato)
	Mammillaria albilanata Backeb.		W/C/SW Mexico (Colima, Guerrero, S Puebla, Oaxaca, Chiapas), W Guatemala
	Mammillaria anniana Glass & R.A.Foster	Bernal Cactus	NE Mexico (S Tamaulipas: Cerro Bernal)
	Mammillaria ariasii U.Guzmán & D.Aquino		C Mexico (NE Guanajuato)
	Mammillaria arreolae P.Carrillo & Ortiz-Brunel		W Mexico (N Central Jalisco)
	Mammillaria aureilanata Backeb.		N Central Mexico (C San Luis Potosí)
	Mammillaria backebergiana Franc.G.Buchenau		C and SW Mexico (México, Michoacán, Guerrero)
	Mammillaria baumii Boed.		NE Mexico (SW Tamaulipas)
	Mammillaria beiselii Diers		W Mexico (SW Jalisco, Colima, Michoacán, W Nayarit: Islas Marías)
	Mammillaria bertholdii Linzen		SW Mexico (Oaxaca)
	Mammillaria bocasana Poselg.	Powderpuff Cactus	N Central Mexico (SW San Luis Potosí, SE Zacatecas)
	Mammillaria bocensis R.T.Craig		NW and W Mexico (S Sonora, Sinaloa, Nayarit?, Jalisco?)
	Mammillaria boelderliana Wohlschl.		N Central Mexico (SE Zacatecas)
	Mammillaria bombycina Quehl	Silken Pincushion Cactus	N Central Mexico (SW Aguascalientes, NE Jalisco)
	Mammillaria brandegeei (J.M.Coult.) Engelm. ex K.Brandegee		NW Mexico (W and S Baja California, N Baja California Sur)
	Mammillaria carmeniae Castañeda		NE Mexico (SW Central Tamaulipas)
	Mammillaria carnea Zucc. ex Pfeiff.		C and SW Mexico (SE Puebla, N Guerrero, N Oaxaca)
	Mammillaria carretii Rebut ex K.Schum.		NE Mexico (SE Coahuila, W Nuevo León)
	Mammillaria chionocephala J.A.Purpus		N and N Central Mexico (S Coahuila, W and S Nuevo León, SW Tamaulipas, NE Durango, N Zacatecas, NW San Luis Potosí)
	Mammillaria coahuilensis (Boed.) Moran		NE and N Central Mexico (S Coahuila, E Durango, N Zacatecas, NW San Luis Potosí)
	Mammillaria columbiana Salm-Dyck		SE Mexico (Chiapas, Yucatán) to Nicragua; Jamaica; N Central and SW Colombia, NW Venezuela
	Mammillaria compressa DC.	Mother of Hundreds	NE to C Mexico (S Nuevo León, SW Tamaulipas, San Luis Potosí, E Guanajuato, Querétaro, Hidalgo)
	Mammillaria crinita DC.		N Central and C Mexico (C and S Zacatecas, San Luis Potosí, Aguascalientes, N/C/E Jalisco, Guanajuato, N Michoacán, Querétaro, Hidalgo)
	Mammillaria crucigera Mart.		C and SW Mexico (SE Puebla, NW Oaxaca)
	Mammillaria decipiens Scheidw.	Bird's Nest Cactus	N Central and C Mexico (SW San Luis Potosí, N and NE Guanajuato, Querétaro)
	Mammillaria deherdtiana Farwig		SW Mexico (C Oaxaca)
	Mammillaria densispina (J.M.Coult.) Orcutt		N Central and C Mexico (S Durango, S Zacatecas, Aguascalientes, N and E Jalisco, SW San Luis Potosí, Guanajuato, W Querétaro)
	Mammillaria discolor Haw.		C and SW Mexico (S Hidalgo, México, Distrito Federal, Tlaxcala, Puebla, W Veracruz, NW Oaxaca)
	Mammillaria dixanthocentron Backeb. ex Mottram		C and SW Mexico (SE Puebla, NW Oaxaca)
	Mammillaria duoformis R.T.Craig & E.Y.Dawson		C and SW Mexico (Morelos, SW and S Puebla, NW Oaxaca)
	Mammillaria duwei Rogoz. & P.J.Braun		C Mexico (NE Guanajuato)
	Mammillaria ekmanii Werderm.		Haiti
	Mammillaria elongata DC.	Gold Lace Cactus	C Mexico (NE Guanajuato, Querétaro, W Hidalgo)
	Mammillaria eriacantha Link & Otto ex Pfeiff.		E Mexico (C Veracruz)
	Mammillaria erythrosperma Boed.		N Central Mexico (SW Central San Luis Potosí)
	Mammillaria evermanniana (Britton & Rose) Orcutt		NW Mexico (E and SE Baja California Sur: islands in Sea of Cortez)
	Mammillaria fittkaui Glass & R.A.Foster		W and C Mexico (Jalisco, Guanajuato, Michoacan?)
	Mammillaria flavicentra Backeb. ex Mottram		C and SW Mexico (SE Puebla, NW Oaxaca)
	Mammillaria formosa Galeotti ex Scheidw.		NE to C Mexico (SE Coahuila, C and S Nuevo León, SW Tamaulipas, N and E Zacatecas, San Luis Potosí, NE Guanajuato)
	Mammillaria gasseriana Boed.		NE Mexico (SW Coahuila, E Durango)
	Mammillaria geminispina Haw.		N Central and C Mexico (C San Luis Potosí, NE Guanajuato, Querétaro, N and E Hidalgo, NW Veracruz)
	Mammillaria gigantea Hildm. ex K.Schum.		N Central and C Mexico (S San Luis Potosí, Guanajuato, W Querétaro, Jalisco?, Durango?)
	Mammillaria glassii R.A.Foster		NE Mexico (SE Coahuila, W/C/S Nuevo León, SW Tamaulipas)
	Mammillaria glochidiata Mart.		C Mexico (NW Hidalgo)
	Mammillaria grusonii Runge		N Mexico (S Chihuahua, S Coahuila, N and E Durango, N Zacatecas)
	Mammillaria guerreronis (Bravo) Boed.		SW Mexico (NE Central Guerrero)
	Mammillaria haageana Pfeiff.		C and SW Mexico (México, Distrito Federal, Morelos, Puebla, W Veracruz, NW and C Oaxaca)
	Mammillaria hahniana Werderm.	Old Woman Cactus	N Central and C Mexico (SE San Luis Potosí, NE Guanajuato, N Querétaro)
	Mammillaria hernandezii Glass & R.A.Foster		SW Mexico (NW Oaxaca)
	Mammillaria herrerae Werderm.		C Mexico (Guanajuato?, C Querétaro, W Hidalgo?)
	Mammillaria heyderi Muehlenpf.	Little Nipple Cactus	SW and S Central United States (SE Arizona, New Mexico, N/W/C/S Texas, SW Oklahoma), N/N Central/SE Mexico (N Sonora to Tamaulipas to C Zacatecas; also N Yucatán)
	Mammillaria huitzilopochtli D.R.Hunt		SW Mexico (NW Oaxaca)
	Mammillaria humboldtii C.Ehrenb.		C Mexico (Hidalgo)
	Mammillaria johnstonii (Britton & Rose) Orcutt		NW Mexico (SW Sonora: near San Carlos)
	Mammillaria karwinskiana Mart.		W/C/SW Mexico (SW Jalisco to S Puebla to Chiapas)
	Mammillaria klissingiana Boed.		NE to N Central Mexico (S Nuevo León, SW Tamaulipas, NW Central San Luis Potosí, NE Guanajuato?)
	Mammillaria knippeliana Quehl		C and SW Mexico (Morelos, N Guerrero)
	Mammillaria kraehenbuehlii (Krainz) Krainz		SW Mexico (NW Oaxaca: Tehuacán-Cuicatlán Biosphere Reserve)
	Mammillaria lasiacantha Engelm.	Lace-Spined Nipple Cactus	SW and S Central United States (S New Mexico, W Texas), N Mexico (N/C/E Chihuahua, Coahuila, NE and E Durango, N Zacatecas)
	Mammillaria laui D.R.Hunt		NE Mexico (SW Central Tamaulipas)
	Mammillaria lenta K.Brandegee		NE Mexico (C and SW Coahuila, Nuevo León?, N Zacatecas?)
	Mammillaria limonensis Repp.		W Mexico (SW Central Jalisco)
	Mammillaria linaresensis R.Wolf & F.Wolf		NE Mexico (C Nuevo León)
	Mammillaria longiflora (Britton & Rose) A.Berger		NW Mexico (S Chihuahua, Durango, W Zacatecas)
	Mammillaria longimamma DC.	Long Nipple Cactus	C Mexico (NE Guanajuato, C Querétaro, W and C Hidalgo)
	Mammillaria luethyi G.S.Hinton		NE Mexico (N Coahuila)
	Mammillaria magnifica Franc.G.Buchenau		C Mexico (E Morelos, W Puebla)
	Mammillaria magnimamma Haw.	Mexican Pincushion Cactus	NE to C Mexico (SE Coahuila to Hidalgo to México)
	Mammillaria mammillaris (L.) H.Karst.		N Venezuela, N Colombia, Windward Islands, Trinidad and Tobago, ABC Islands
	Mammillaria manana W.A.Fitz Maur. & B.Fitz Maur.		W Mexico (S Central Jalisco)
	Mammillaria marksiana Krainz		NW Mexico (S Sonora?, Sinaloa, SW Chihuahua, W Durango)
	Mammillaria mathildae Kraehenb. & Krainz		C Mexico (SE Guanajuato, SW Querétaro, NE Michoacán)
	Mammillaria matudae Bravo		C Mexico (México)
	Mammillaria meiacantha Engelm.	Little Nipple Cactus	SW and S Central United States (New Mexico, W Texas), N and N Central Mexico (Chihuahua and Coahuila to Zacatecas and San Luis Potosí)
	Mammillaria melaleuca Karw. ex Salm-Dyck		NE Mexico (SW Tamaulipas)
	Mammillaria melanocentra Poselg.		N Mexico (Durango, S Coahuila, W/C/S Nuevo León, S Tamaulipas)
	Mammillaria mercadensis Patoni		N Central/C Mexico (Durango, Zacatecas, N and NE Jalisco, Aguascalientes, W San Luis Potosí, Guanajuato)
	Mammillaria meyranii Bravo		C Mexico (E Michoacán, W México)
	Mammillaria microhelia Werderm.		C Mexico (W Querétaro)
	Mammillaria moelleriana Boed.		N Central Mexico (SE Durango, NW and C Zacatecas)
	Mammillaria monochrysacantha Gonz.-Zam., D.Aquino & Dan.Sánchez		C Mexico (NE Guanajuato)
	Mammillaria morentiniana Gonz.-Zam., D.Aquino, J.Mohl & Dan.Sánchez		N Central Mexico (SW San Luis Potosí)
	Mammillaria muehlenpfordtii C.F.Först.		N Central/C Mexico (SW San Luis Potosí, N and NE Guanajuato, W Querétaro)
	Mammillaria multihamata Boed.		N Central/C Mexico (San Luis Potosí, NE Guanajuato)
	Mammillaria mystax Mart.		C and SW Mexico (SE Puebla, W Veracruz, NW Oaxaca)
	Mammillaria nana Backeb.		N Central and C Mexico (SW San Luis Potosí, N Guanajuato)
	Mammillaria napina J.A.Purpus		C Mexico (SE Puebla)
	Mammillaria nivosa Link ex Pfeiff.	Woolly Nipple Cactus	S Bahamas, Turks and Caicos Islands, Puerto Rico (Mona Island), Virgin Islands, St. Martin, Saint-Barthélemy, Antigua and Barbuda
	Mammillaria nunezii (Britton & Rose) Orcutt		W/C/SW Mexico (S Jalisco, Michoacán, México, S Morelos, N Guerrero)
	Mammillaria occulta Zamudio & U.Guzmán		C Mexico (E Central Querétaro)
	Mammillaria orcuttii Boed.		N Central and C Mexico (SW Central San Luis Potosí, NE Guanajuato?, C Hidalgo)
	Mammillaria oteroi Glass & R.A.Foster		SW Mexico (NW Oaxaca)
	Mammillaria parkinsonii C.Ehrenb.		C Mexico (NE Guanajuato, C Querétaro, NW Hidalgo)
	Mammillaria pectinifera F.A.C.Weber		C and SW Mexico (SE Puebla, NW Oaxaca)
	Mammillaria peninsularis (Britton & Rose) Orcutt		NW Mexico (S Baja California Sur)
	Mammillaria pennispinosa Krainz		N Mexico (NE Durango, SW Coahuila?)
	Mammillaria perbella Hildm. ex K.Schum.		C Mexico (NE Guanajuato, C Querétaro, NW Hidalgo)
	Mammillaria perezdelarosae Bravo & Scheinvar		N Central and C? Mexico (S Zacatecas, Aguascalientes, NE Jalisco, NW Guanajuato?)
	Mammillaria petrophila K.Brandegee	Pichilingue Nipple Cactus	NW Mexico (S Baja California Sur)
	Mammillaria petterssonii Hildm.		N Central and C Mexico (SE Durango to W Querétaro)
	Mammillaria picta Meinsh.		NE and N Central Mexico (S Nuevo León, SW Tamaulipas, N Central San Luis Potosí)
	Mammillaria pilispina J.A.Purpus		NE and N Central Mexico (SE Coahuila?, S Nuevo León, SW Tamaulipas, NW and C San Luis Potosí, N Zacatecas?)
	Mammillaria plumosa F.A.C.Weber	Feather Cactus	NE Mexico (SE Coahuila, NW Nuevo León)
	Mammillaria polyedra Mart.		C and SW Mexico (S Puebla, NE Guerrero, NW Oaxaca)
	Mammillaria polythele Mart.		W and C Mexico (E Jalisco, Guanajuato, Querétaro, Hidalgo)
	Mammillaria pottsii Scheer ex Salm-Dyck	Rat-Tail Nipple Cactus	S Central United States (SW Texas), N and N Central Mexico (C and E Chihuahua, W/C/S Coahuila, W Nuevo León, NE and E Durango, N Zacatecas, NW San Luis Potosí)
	Mammillaria pringlei (J.M.Coult.) K.Brandegee		C Mexico (S Querétaro, S Hidalgo, N México, Veracruz?)
	Mammillaria prolifera (Mill.) Haw.	Silver Cluster Cactus	S Central United States (S Central and S Texas), NE to C Mexico (N and E Coahuila, Nuevo León, Tamaulipas, C San Luis Potosí, N Querétaro), Cuba, N and S Hispaniola
	Mammillaria rekoi (Britton & Rose) Vaupel		SW Mexico (C Oaxaca)
	Mammillaria rhodantha Link & Otto	Rainbow Pincushion Cactus	N Central/W/C Mexico (C and E Jalisco, S Zacatecas, S Aguascalientes, Guanajuato, Querétaro, Hidalgo, NE Puebla, N Tlaxcala, Distrito Federal, N México, N Michoacán)
	Mammillaria roseoalba Boed.		NE Mexico (SW Tamaulipas, Nuevo León?)
	Mammillaria rzedowskiana Zamudio & U.Guzmán		N Central/C Mexico (SE San Luis Potosí, NE Querétaro)
	Mammillaria sanchez-mejoradae Rodr.González		NE Mexico (W Nuevo León)
	Mammillaria sartorii J.A.Purpus		E Mexico (C Veracruz)
	Mammillaria scheinvariana R.Ortega V. & Glass		C Mexico (Querétaro, Hidalgo)
	Mammillaria schiedeana C.Ehrenb.		N Central and C Mexico (C and S San Luis Potosí, NE Guanajuato, N Querétaro, Hidalgo)
	Mammillaria schwarzii Shurly		C Mexico (N Guanajuato)
	Mammillaria scoria Gonz.-Zam., D.Aquino & Dan.Sánchez		C Mexico (SW Querétaro)
	Mammillaria scrippsiana (Britton & Rose) Orcutt		W and N Central Mexico (Sinaloa, W and S Durango, Nayarit, S Zacatecas, Jalisco)
	Mammillaria sempervivi DC.		NE to C Mexico (S Nuevo León, San Luis Potosí, NE Guanajuato, Querétaro, Hidalgo, N México)
	Mammillaria senilis Lodd. ex Salm-Dyck		NW and W Mexico (SW Chihuahua, E Sinaloa, W and S Durango, W Zacatecas, E Nayarit, N Jalisco)
	Mammillaria sinistrohamata Boed.		N Central Mexico (Zacatecas)
	Mammillaria solisioides Backeb.		C and SW Mexico (S Puebla, NW Oaxaca)
	Mammillaria sonorensis R.T.Craig		NW Mexico (SE Sonora, SW Chihuahua)
	Mammillaria sphaerica A.Dietr.	Longmamma Nipple Cactus	S Central United States (S Texas), NE Mexico (NE Coahuila?, E Nuevo León, Tamaulipas)
	Mammillaria spinosissima Lem.		C and SW Mexico (México, Morelos, N Guerrero)
	Mammillaria standleyi (Britton & Rose) Orcutt		NW Mexico (C/E/S Sonora, W Chihuahua, N Sinaloa)
	Mammillaria supertexta Mart. ex Pfeiff.		C and SW Mexico (SE Puebla, NW Oaxaca)
	Mammillaria surculosa Boed.		NE and N Central Mexico (SW Tamaulipas, N Central San Luis Potosí)
	Mammillaria tayloriorum Glass & R.A.Foster		NW Mexico (SW Sonora: Isla San Pedro Nolasco)
	Mammillaria tepexicensis J.Meyrán		SW Mexico (NW Oaxaca)
	Mammillaria uncinata Zucc. ex Pfeiff.		N Central/C/SW Mexico (S Durango to San Luis Potosí to NW Oaxaca)
	Mammillaria varieaculeata Franc.G.Buchenau		C Mexico (SE Puebla)
	Mammillaria vetula Mart.		C Mexico (NE Guanajuato, C Querétaro, W and C Hidalgo)
	Mammillaria voburnensis Scheer	Woburn Cactus	S Mexico (S and E Oaxaca, Chiapas), C Guatemala, El Salvador, W and S Honduras, NW Nicaragua
	Mammillaria wagneriana Boed.		W and N Central Mexico (C/E/S Durango, W/E/S Zacatecas, N Jalisco, Aguascalientes)
	Mammillaria weingartiana Boed.		NE Mexico (S Central Nuevo León)
	Mammillaria wiesingeri Boed.		C Mexico (Hidalgo, México, N Puebla)
	Mammillaria winterae Boed.		NE Mexico (SE Coahuila, C Nuevo León, SW Tamaulipas?)
	Mammillaria xaltianguensis Sánchez-Mej.		W? and SW Mexico (SW Jalisco?, Colima?, Michoacán, Guerrero)
	Mammillaria zeilmanniana Boed.		C Mexico (SW Guanajuato, Querétaro?)
	Mammillaria zephyranthoides Scheidw.		N Central/C/SW Mexico (SW San Luis Potosí, Guanajuato, S Querétaro, SW Hidalgo, NW México, SE Puebla, NW Oaxaca)
	Mammillaria zublerae Repp.		NE Mexico (SE Tamaulipas)

Image	Hybrid Name	Common Name	Native Range	Parentage
	Mammillaria × gajii Chvastek & Halda		SW Mexico (C Oaxaca)	Mammillaria deherdtiana ssp. dodsonii × rekoi

=== Some former species ===
- Mammillaria angelensis = Cochemiea angelensis
- Mammillaria barbata = Cochemiea barbata
- Mammillaria boolii = Cochemiea boolii
- Mammillaria dioica = Cochemiea dioica
- Mammillaria fraileana = Cochemiea fraileana
- Mammillaria goodridgei = Cochemiea goodridgei
- Mammillaria grahamii = Cochemiea grahamii
- Mammillaria guelzowiana = Cochemiea guelzowiana
- Mammillaria mainiae = Cochemiea mainiae
- Mammillaria multidigitata = Cochemiea multidigitata
- Mammillaria pondii = Cochemiea pondii
- Mammillaria sheldonii = Cochemiea grahamii
- Mammillaria tetrancistra = Cochemiea tetrancistra
- Mammillaria thornberi = Cochemiea thornberi
- Mammillaria wrightii = Cochemiea wrightii
- Mammillaria elegans = Mammillaria geminispina
- Mammillaria marcosii = Mammillaria multihamata
- Mammillaria microthele = Mammillaria formosa subsp. microthele
- Mammillaria morganiana = Mammillaria parkinsonii
Mammillaria bombycina

Mammillaria elongata var. rufocrocea

Crested Mammillaria grusonii, Durango, Mexico

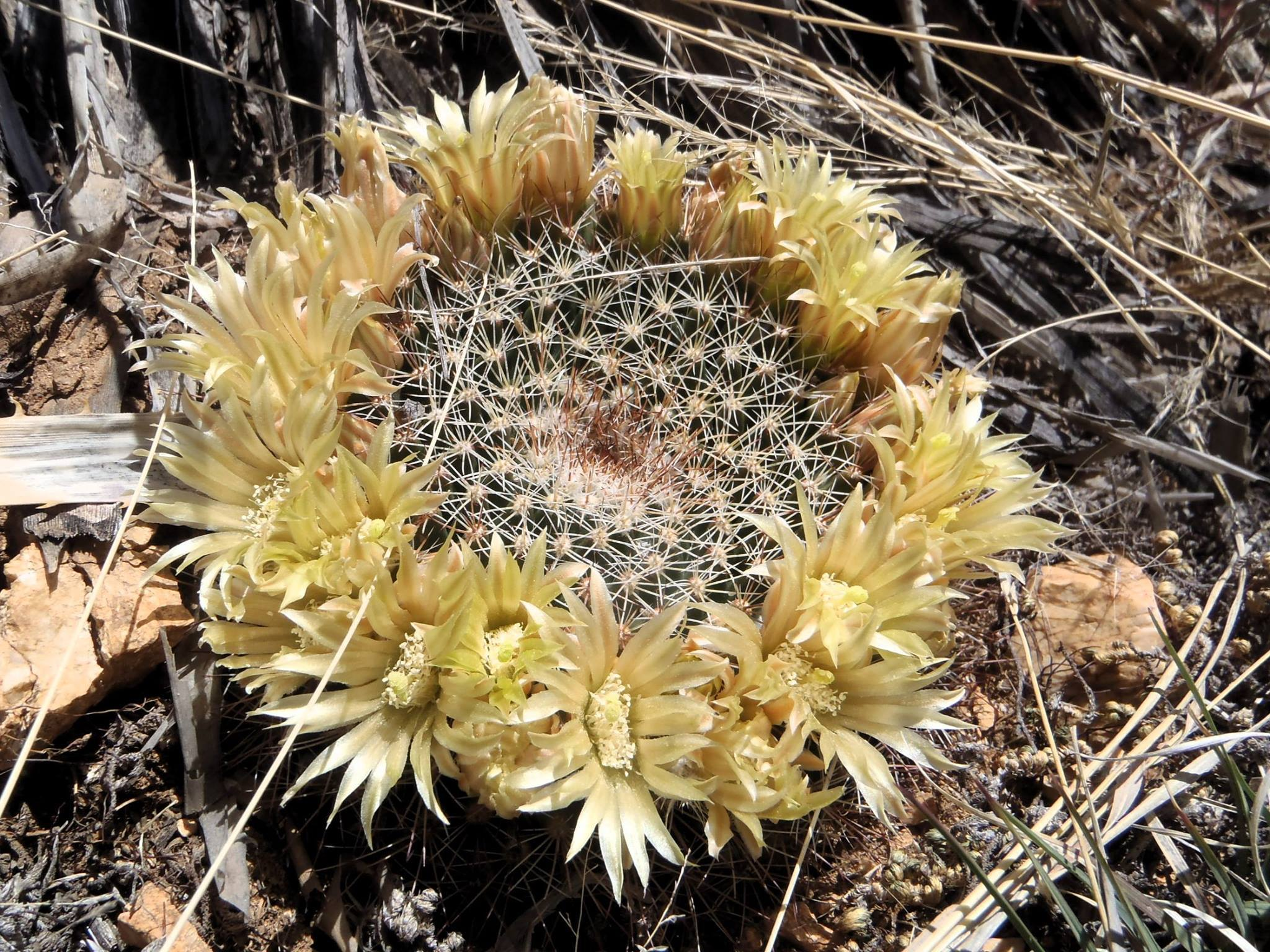
Mammillaria heyderi in Saguaro National Park, Arizona, United States

Mammillaria luethyi

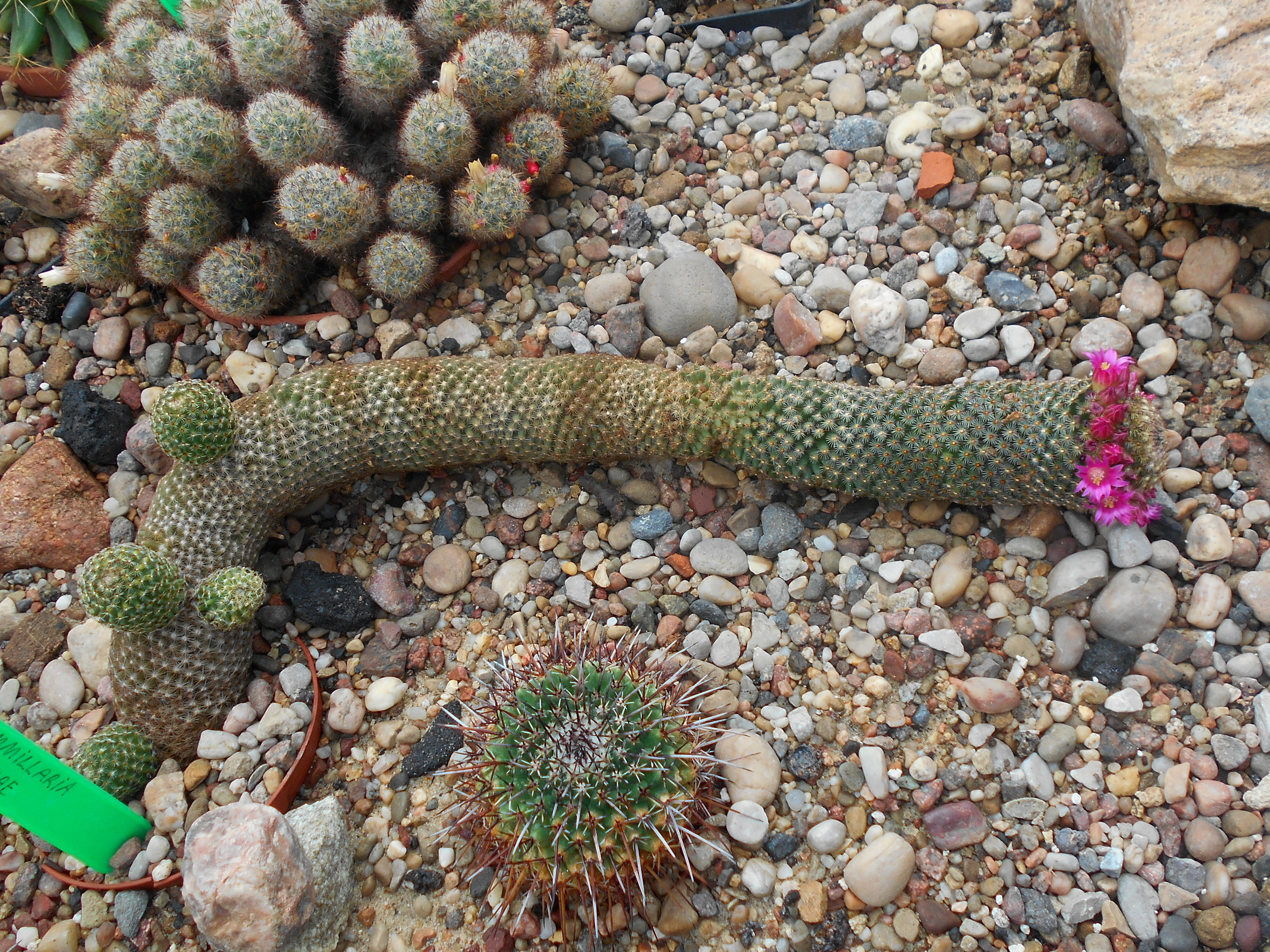
Mammillaria matudae

Mammillaria mystax

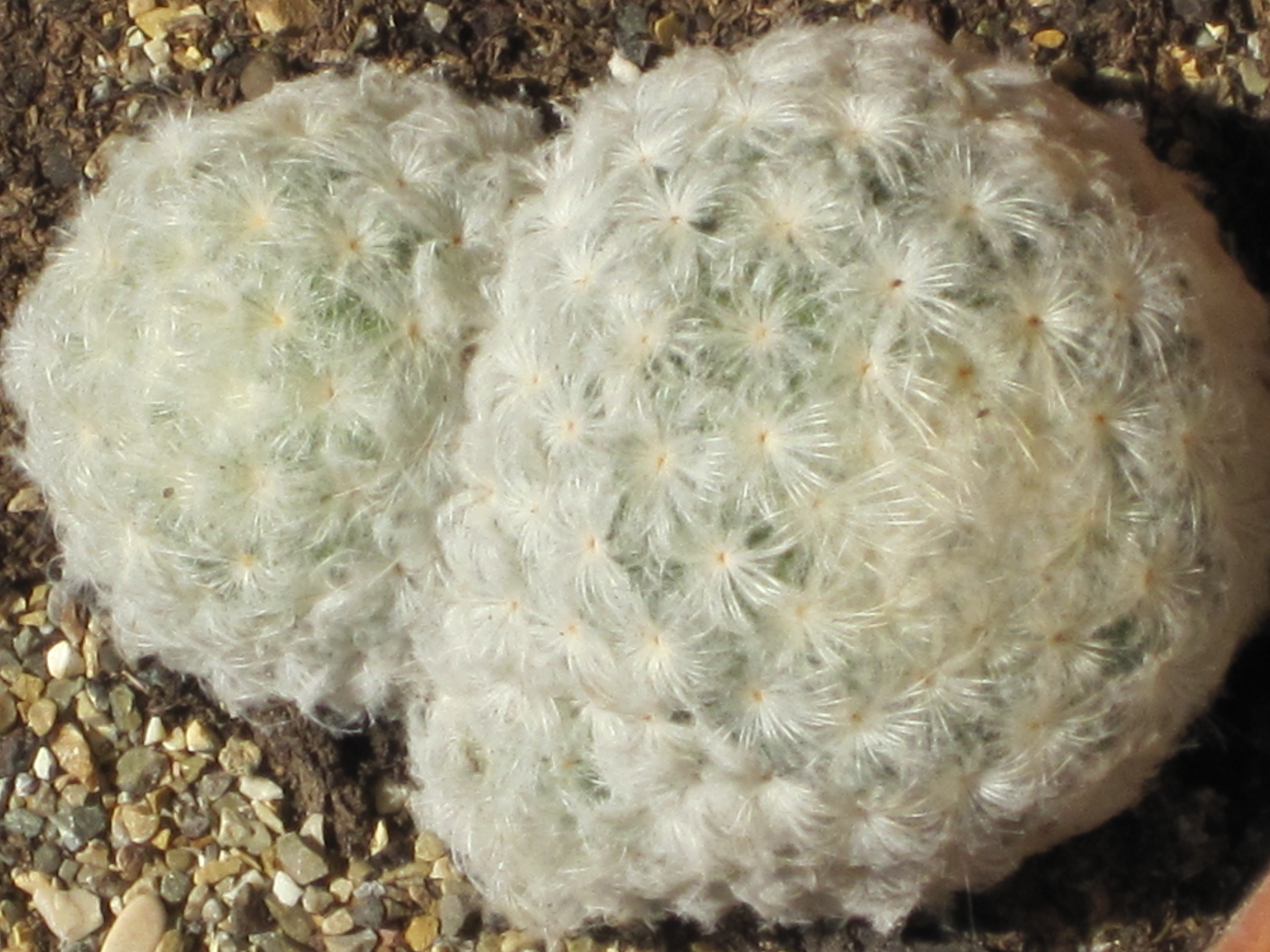
Mammillaria plumosa

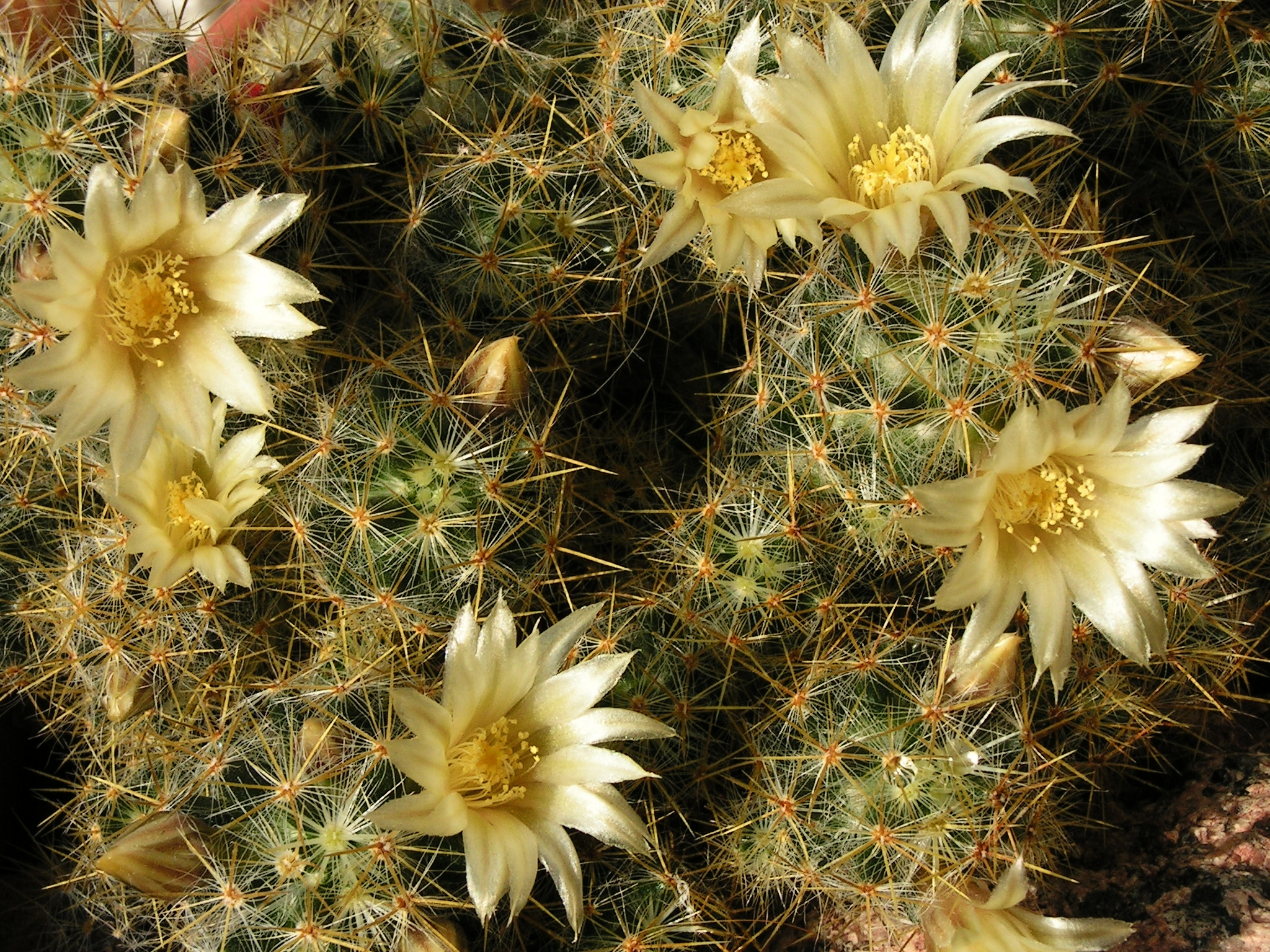
Mammillaria prolifera

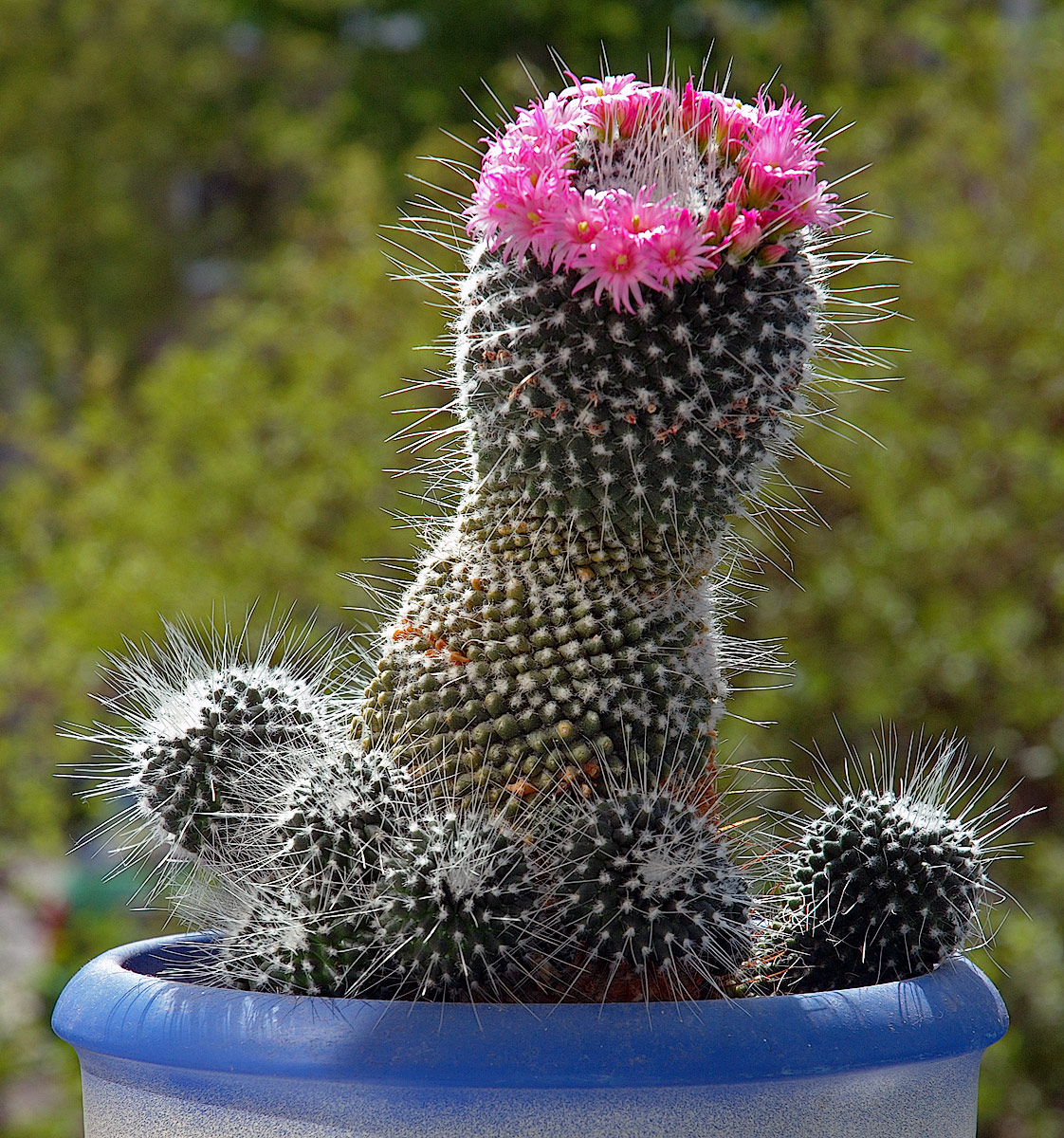
Mammillaria spinosissima 'Un Pico'

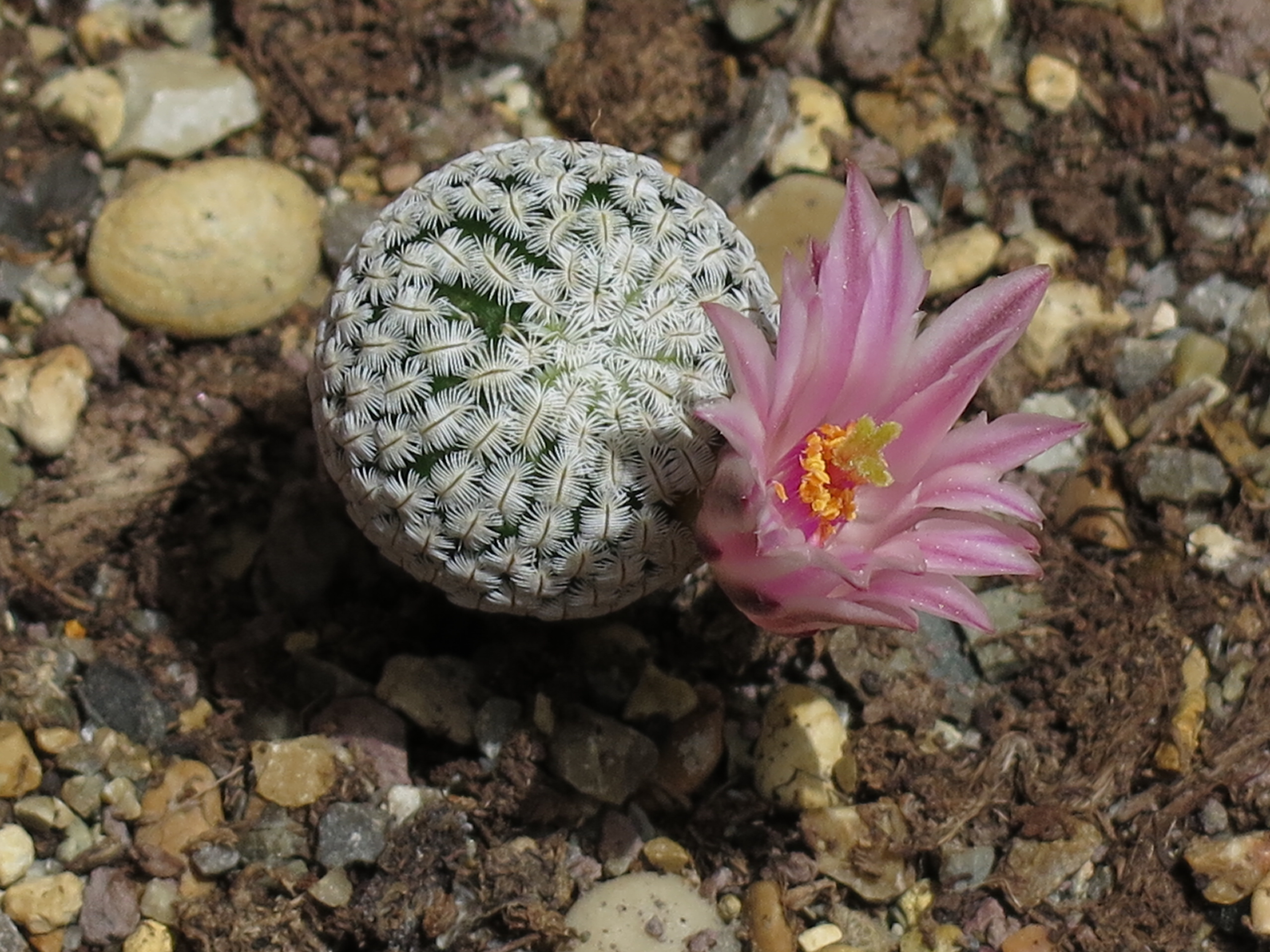
Mammillaria pectinifera

Mammillaria pottsii

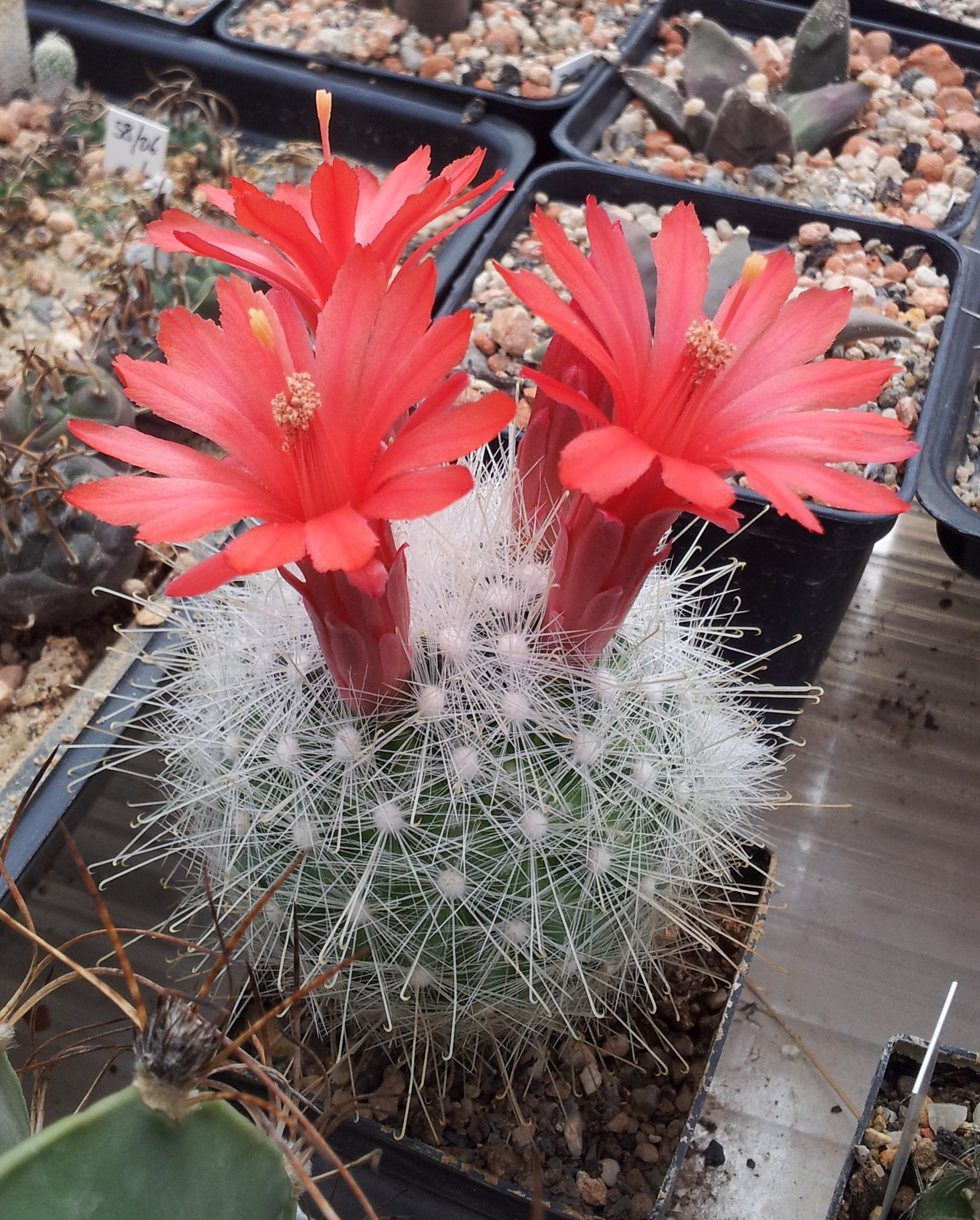
Mammillaria senilis

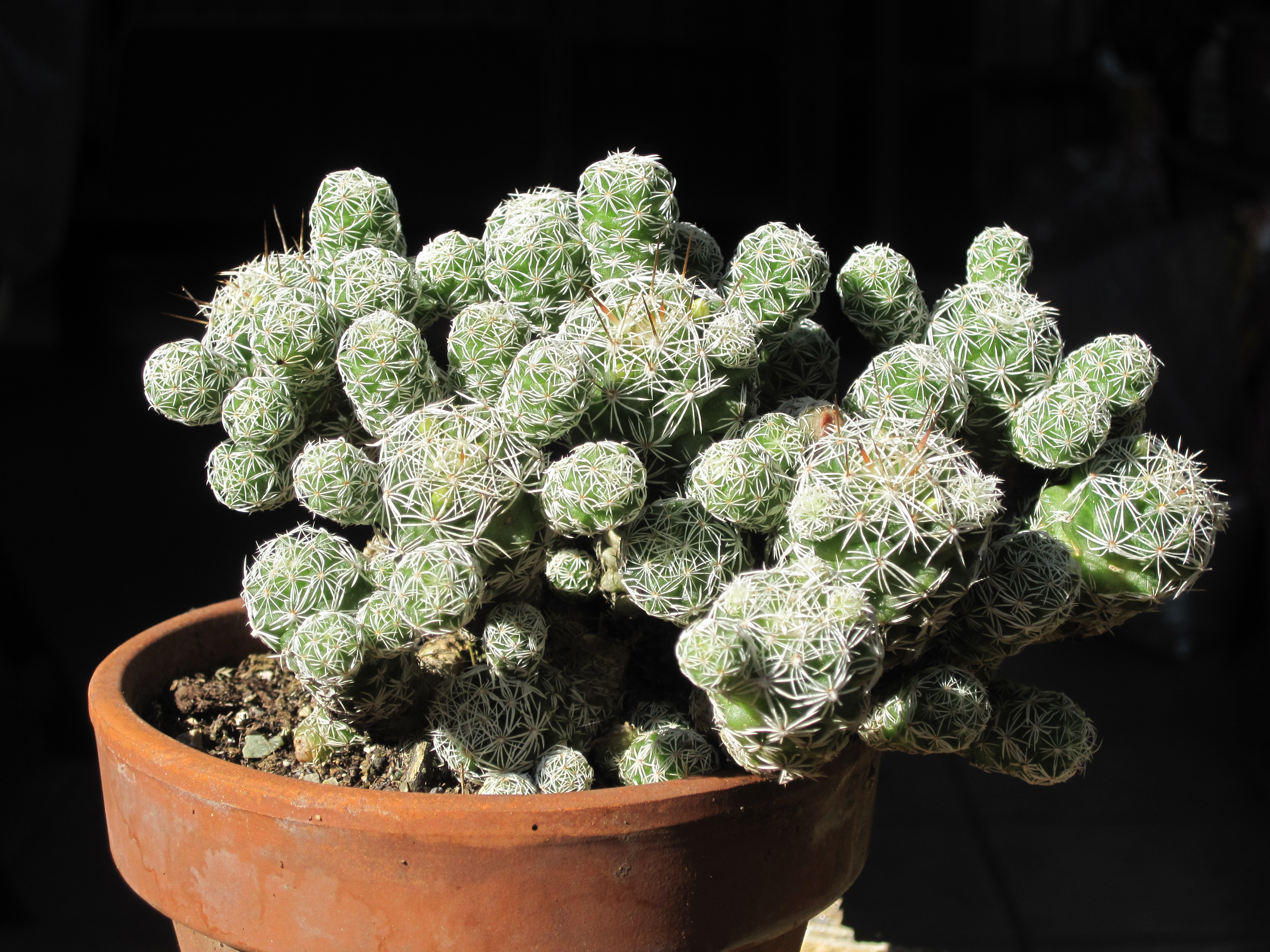
Mammillaria vetula

== Distribution and habitat ==
Mammillaria species are predominantly found in Mexico but also have a wide range of distribution in neighboring regions north of the equator including the southwest United States, the Caribbean, Guatemala and Honduras. The southernmost limits of its range appear to be Colombia and Venezuela, where only two known species are found. Within this wide distribution, some species will exhibit large variations depending on the locality, sometimes even within just a few hundred feet. Some of these variations are so extreme that they have resulted in classifications of new species, many of which are so limited to one locality that they are considered critically endangered.

== Cultivation ==
Mammillaria species are extremely variable in form and spination from species to species, and attractive flowers, making them attractive for cactus hobbyists. Most are considered easy to cultivate, though some species are among the hardest cacti to grow. Several taxa are threatened with extinction at least in the wild, due to habitat destruction and poaching for the exotic plant trade. Cactus fanciers can assist conservation of these rare plants by choosing nursery-bred specimens (wild-collected ones are illegal to possess for the rarest species) or by growing plants from seed. Several Mammillaria species are relatively easy (for cacti) to grow from seeds. One such species, popular and widely available from nursery stock but endangered in the wild, is Mammillaria zeilmanniana.

== Uses ==
Water can be extracted from the cacti. The fruit from several species is edible, sometimes described as delicious, and is best harvested when fully extruded from the axil and separates easily from the plant.

== Conservation ==
Many Mammillaria species have been assessed for the IUCN Red List. Conservation statuses vary widely: some species are listed as Least Concern (e.g., Mammillaria mammillaris, Mammillaria scrippsiana), while others are classified as Vulnerable (e.g., Mammillaria carretii) or Near Threatened (e.g., Mammillaria hahniana). A number of species are listed as Critically Endangered, including Mammillaria zeilmanniana and Mammillaria laui. The entire genus is listed in Appendix II of the Convention on International Trade in Endangered Species of Wild Fauna and Flora (CITES), meaning that international trade is regulated to prevent unsustainable harvesting.
