= Pincushion cactus =

Pincushion cactus is a common name for several cacti and may refer to:

- Pelecyphora
- Mammillaria
- Pediocactus
