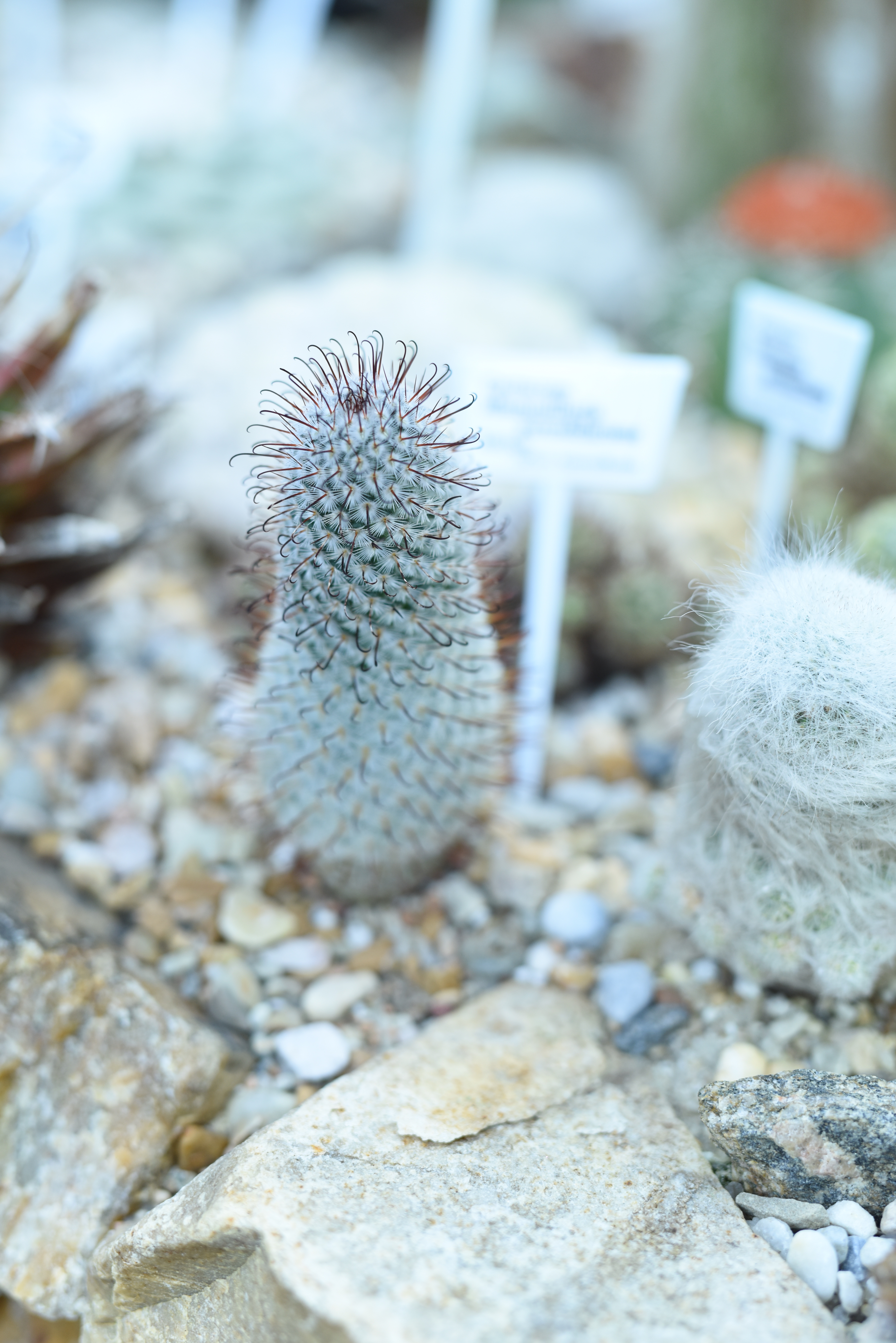

Scientific classification
- Kingdom: Plantae
- Clade: Tracheophytes
- Clade: Angiosperms
- Clade: Eudicots
- Order: Caryophyllales
- Family: Cactaceae
- Subfamily: Cactoideae
- Genus: Mammillaria
- Species: M. perezdelarosae

Binomial name
- Mammillaria perezdelarosae Bravo & Scheinvar

Synonyms
- Escobariopsis perezdelarosae (Bravo & Scheinvar) Doweld; Mammillaria bombycina subsp. perezdelarosae (Bravo & Scheinvar) D.R.Hunt; Mammillaria perezdelarosae subsp. andersoniana W.A.Fitz Maur. & B.Fitz Maur.

= Mammillaria perezdelarosae =

Species of cactus

Mammillaria perezdelarosae is a species of cactus – a member of the family Cactaceae, placed in the tribe Cacteae. This cactus is common. It blooms with light pink and white flowers and is native to Jalisco, Mexico.

== Cultivation ==
This cactus needs at least 50 °F (10 °C) to survive, is recommended for USDA zones 9-11 and needs little water, as do most cacti.

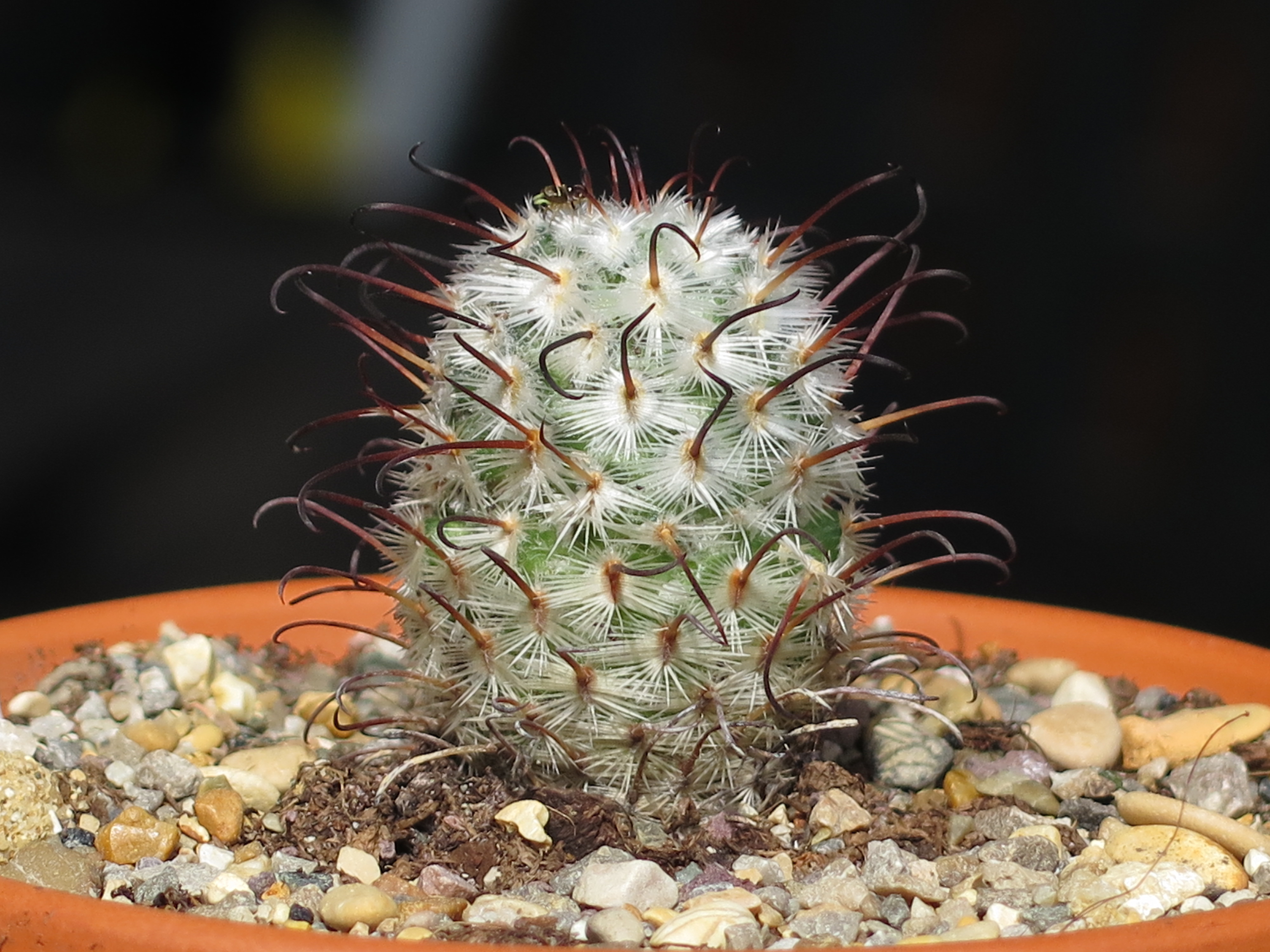
View of the plant

== Bibliography ==
- "Mammillaria Perezdelarosae | CITES". cites.org.
