= Hugo Baum =

German botanist (1867–1950)

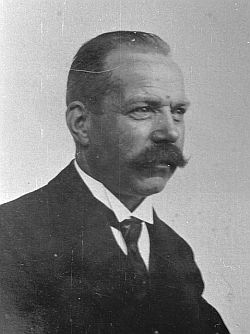
Hugo Baum.

Hugo Baum (17 January 1867, in Forst (Lausitz), Kingdom of Prussia – 15 April 1950, in Rostock) was a German botanist.

As a result of his participation in the Cunene Zambezi expedition from 11 August 1899 to 6 June 1900 to the heart of the African continent, not only was the evaluation of the economic potential of southern Angola effected, but also significant botanical and zoological collections occurred. Returned from Africa he lived in Rostock and worked at the Botanical Garden of the University of Rostock where, in spite of difficulties, he played a decisive role in the development of this institution. At the age of 58 he once more went on a journey and travelled to Mexico where once again many new discoveries were due to his efforts. In his honor 70 plants, where of two types, namely Baumiella (mushroom) and Baumia (family of the Scrophulariaceae), a butterfly's species and two species of ants, were named after him.

== Bibliography ==
- Hugo Baum (1903), Otto Warburg (ed.), Kunene-Sambesi-Expedition (in German), Berlin: Kolonial-Wirtschaftliches Komitee, pp. 1–153
- Hugo Baum (1925), Walter Allendorff (ed.), Allendorffs Kulturpraxis der Kalt- und Warmhauspflanzen (in German), Berlin: Parey
