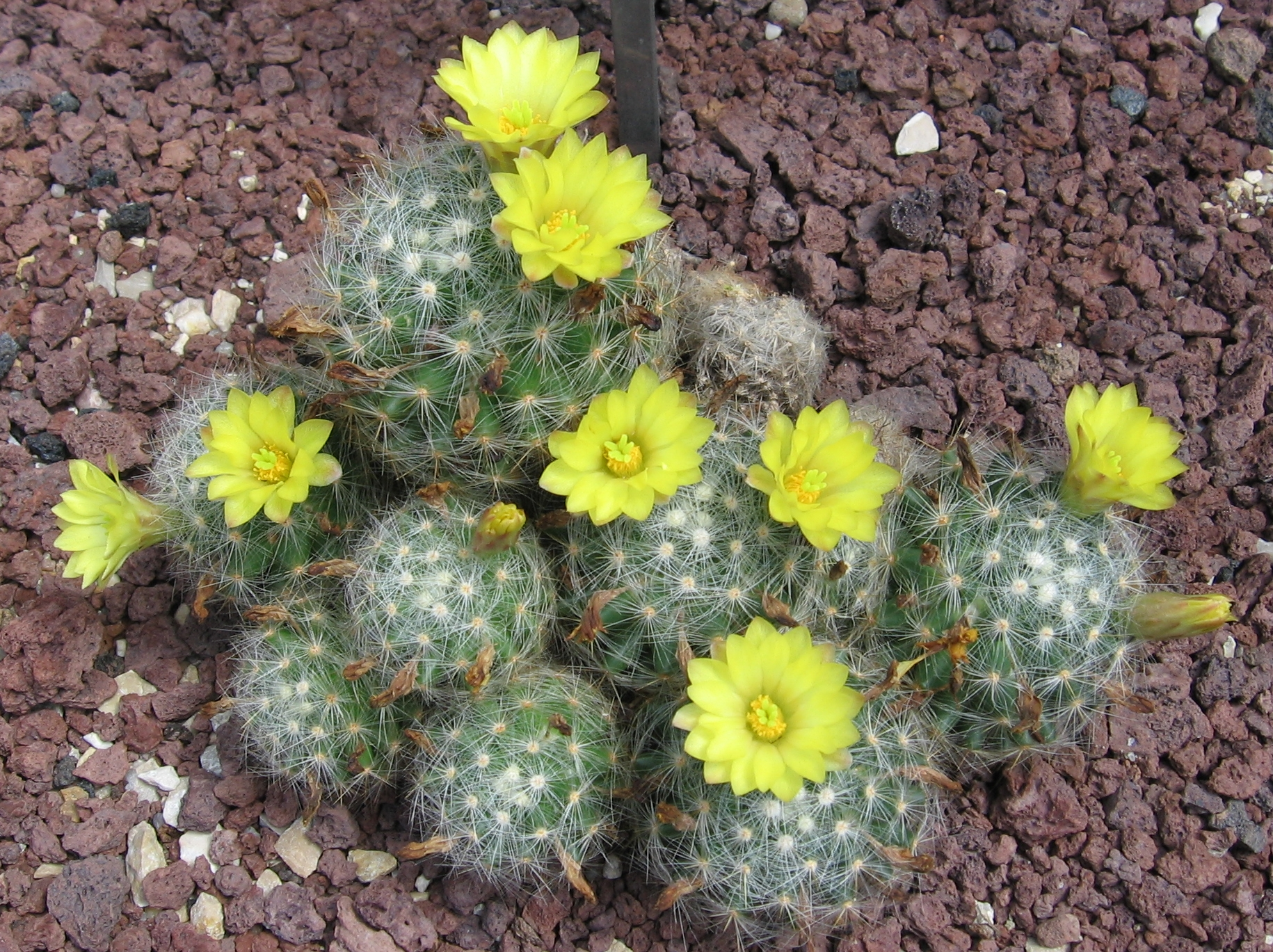

Conservation status
- Least Concern (IUCN 3.1)

Scientific classification
- Kingdom: Plantae
- Clade: Tracheophytes
- Clade: Angiosperms
- Clade: Eudicots
- Order: Caryophyllales
- Family: Cactaceae
- Subfamily: Cactoideae
- Genus: Mammillaria
- Species: M. baumii

Binomial name
- Mammillaria baumii (Boedeker, 1926)

= Mammillaria baumii =

Species of cactus

Mammillaria baumii is a species of cactus in the subfamily Cactoideae. It is endemic to Mexico. It was named for botanist Hugo Baum.
