= Zoological Collection Rostock =

Scientific university collection

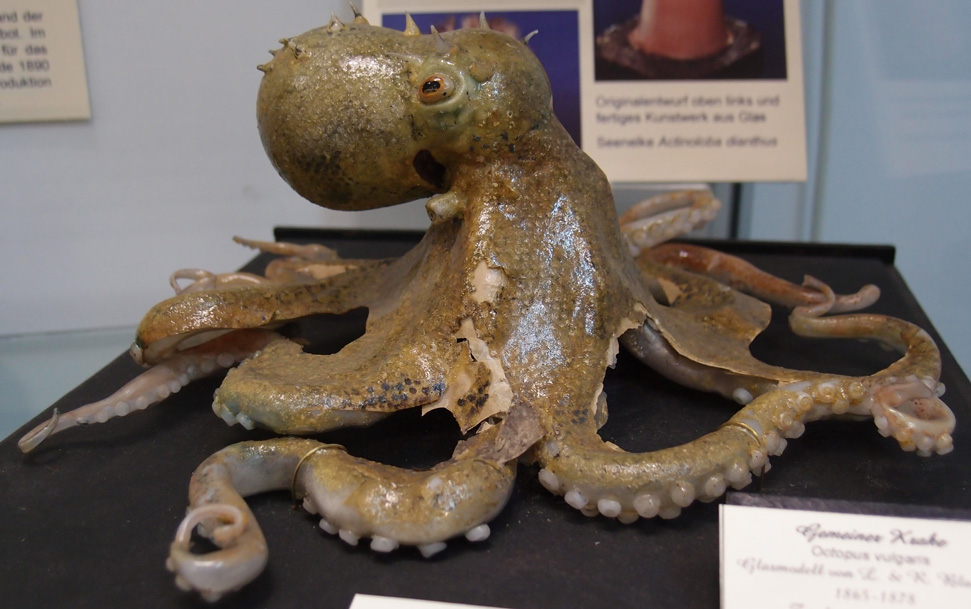
Blaschka model at the Zoological Collection Rostock

Location in Mecklenburg-Vorpommern

The Zoological Collection Rostock (ZSRO, German: Zoologische Sammlung Rostock) is a scientific university collection and associated with the zoological department of the University of Rostock, Germany. The collection was founded in 1775 by Oluf Gerhard Tychsen and is used both for teaching and research. Parts of the collection are open to the public.

== History ==
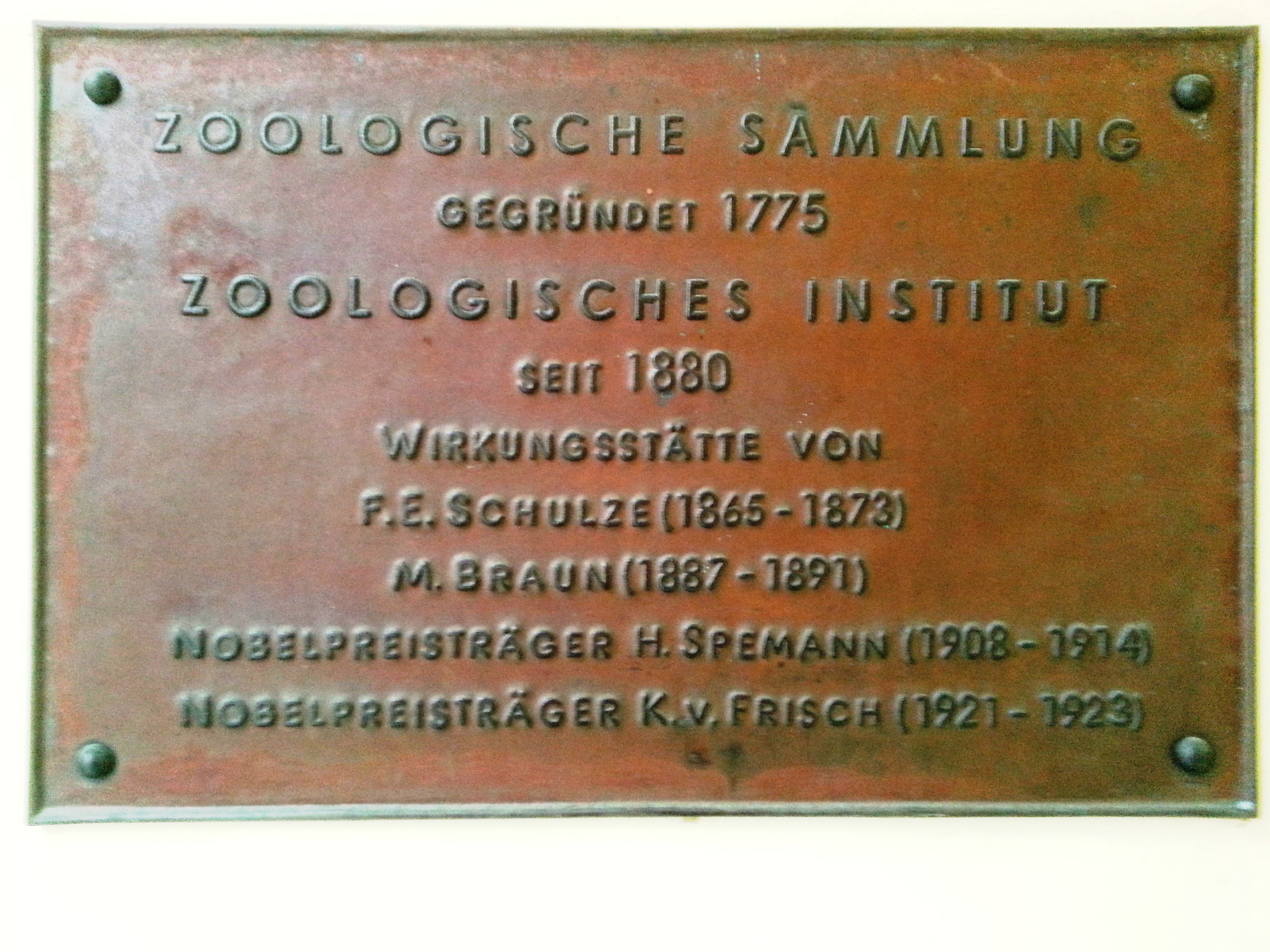
Plaque at the Zoological Institute of the Rostock University

The zoological collection was founded in 1775 by Oluf Gerhard Tychsen, an orientalist and head librarian of the University of Rostock. In 1789, the collection became part of the “Academic Museum”. It was relocated to the Universitätsplatz in 1844 after the adoption of parts of the collection of the grand duke in Ludwigslust. The zoological collection is still located at the Universitätsplatz. Since 2002, it features a public exhibition room with changing special exhibitions.

== Holdings ==
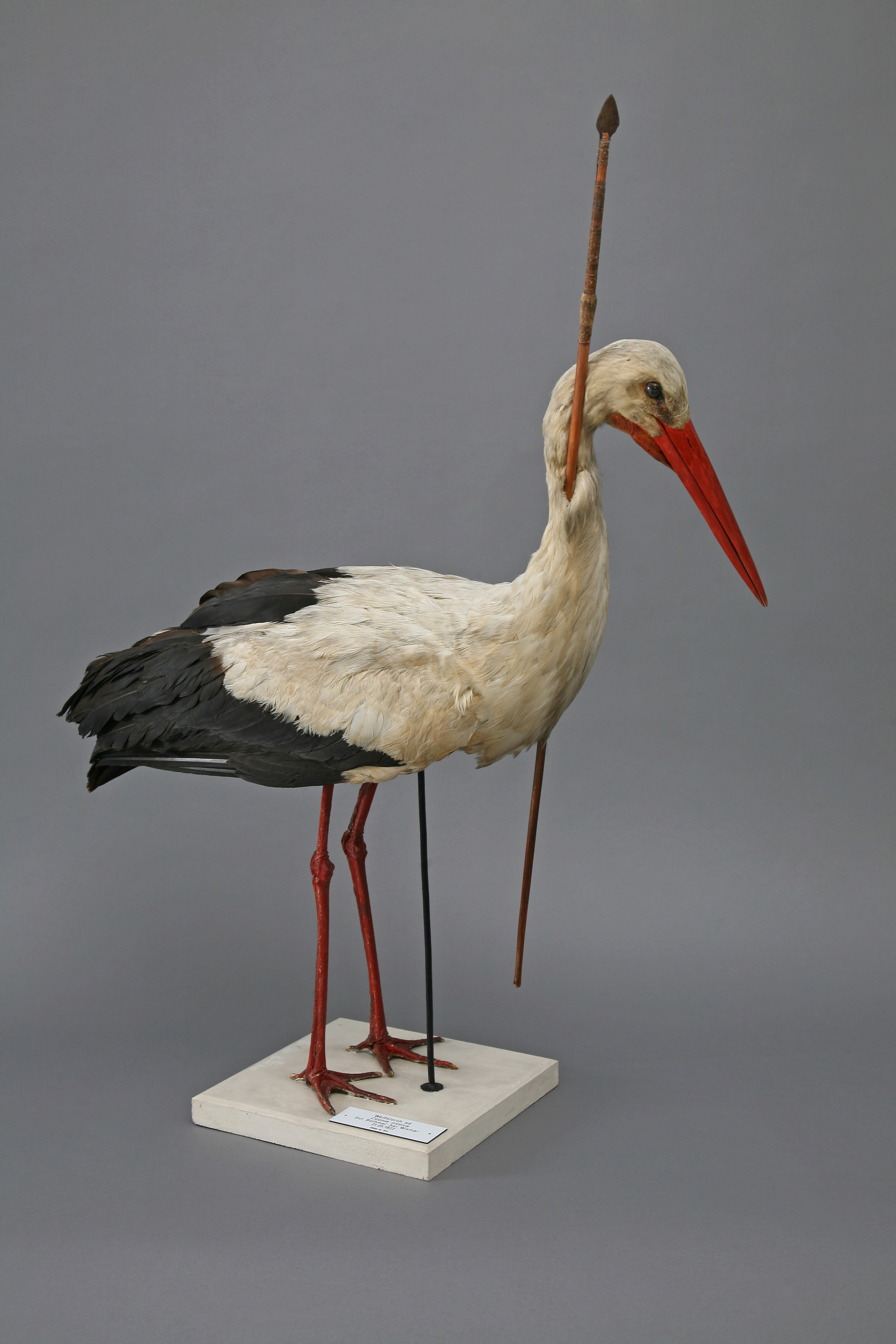
The Rostocker Pfeilstorch

The collection holds about 140.000 series of taxa from all over the world. The collection focus includes mollusca (ca. 14.000), Polychaeta (ca. 2.500), fish (ca. 2.500), birds (ca. 2.400), and scorpions (ca. 1.000). Furthermore, the collection owns important historical teaching models, including models by the Blaschka family and Ziegler wax models. It is also home to the Rostocker Pfeilstorch, which provided early evidence for long-distance migration by storks.
