= Michaeliskloster =

Church building in Rostock, Germany

Coordinates: 54°05′14″N 12°08′10″E

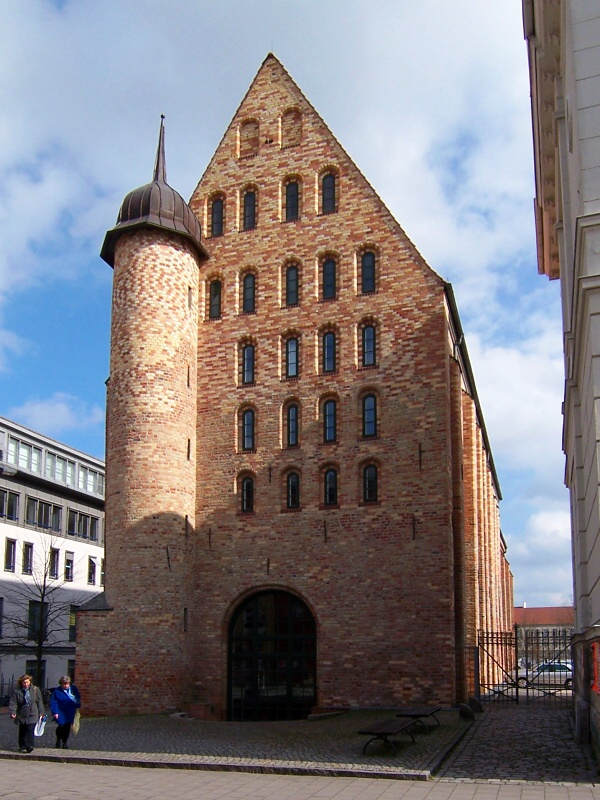
West view of Michaeliskloster

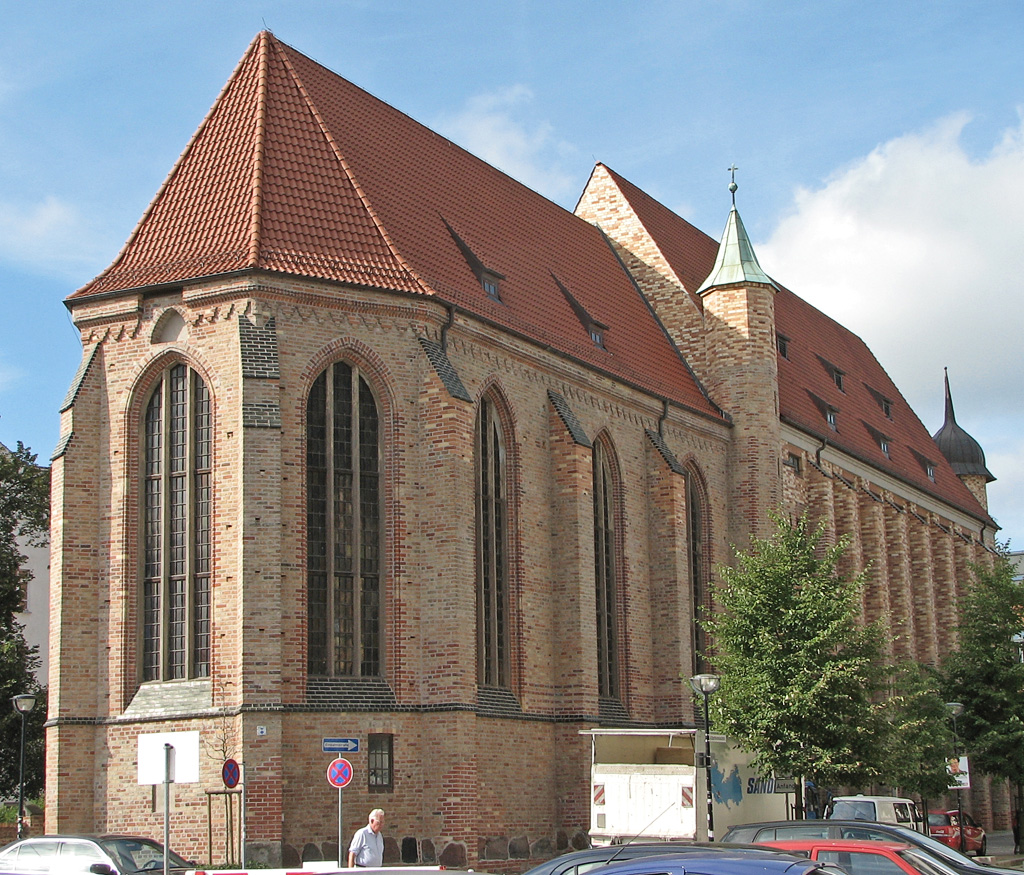
East view of Michaeliskloster

Michaeliskloster is a former monastery building in Rostock, Mecklenburg-Vorpommern, Germany. It was once home to the Brethren of the Common Life and served as a major center for printing and bookbinding during the late Middle Ages.

In April 1942, the monastery was reduced to ruins after a British bombing raid completely destroyed it by fire. The eastern section was restored in the 1950s, and a United Methodist congregation was relocated there. In 1994, the historic rear façade of the west wing was reconstructed using replica form bricks and specially sized bricks designed to match the character and physical properties of the original masonry.

Today, Michaeliskloster houses the special collections of the University of Rostock Library.
