= Pfeilstorch =

Migrating stork which has been hit by an arrow

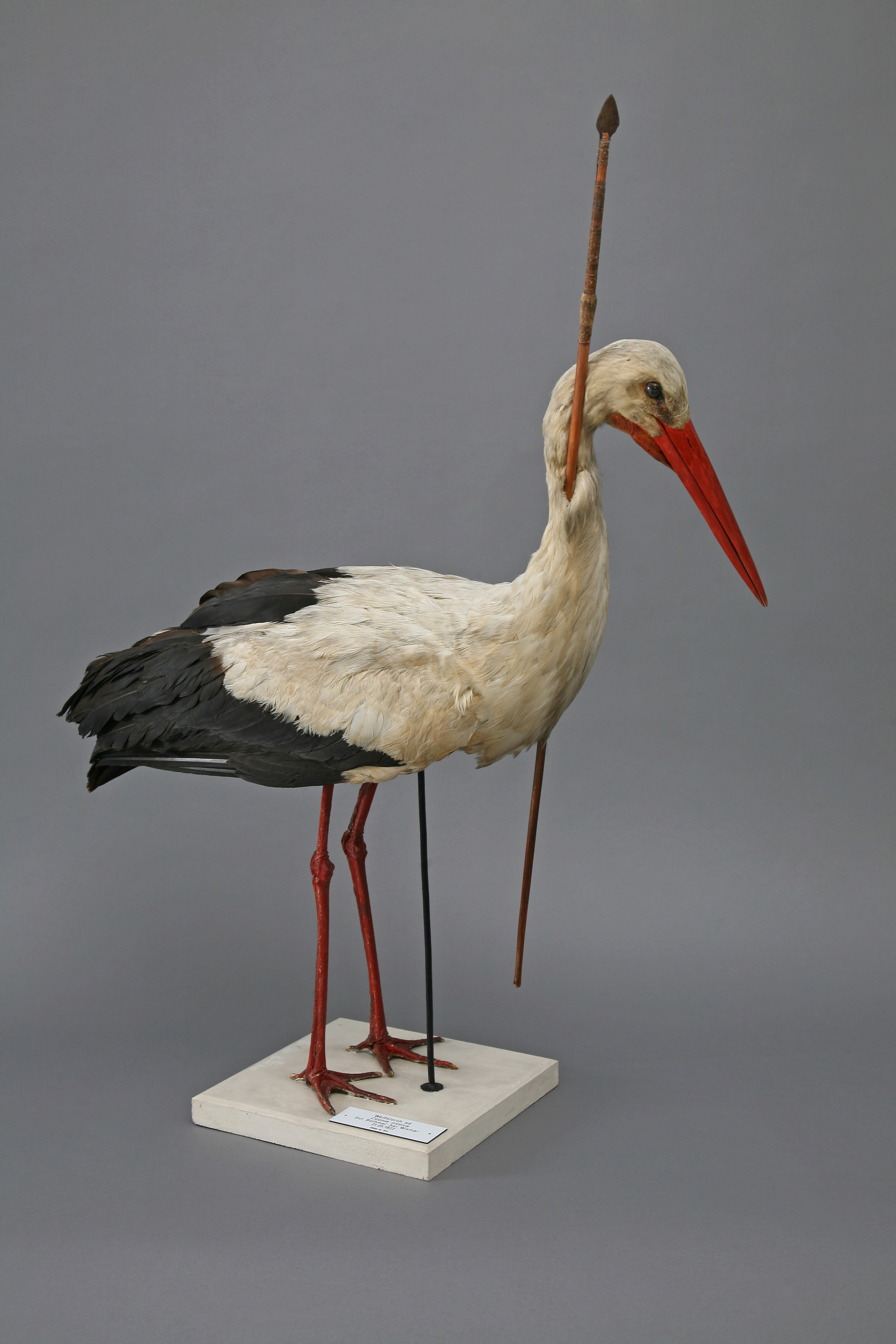
The Rostocker Pfeilstorch, found in 1822, demonstrated that birds migrated rather than hibernating or changing form in winter.

A Pfeilstorch (German for 'arrow stork', pronounced [ˈpfaɪ̯l.ˌʃtɔɐ̯ç]; plural Pfeilstörche, [-ˌʃtœɐ̯.çə]) is a white stork that is injured by an arrow or spear while wintering in Africa and returns to Europe with the projectile stuck in its body. As of 2003, about 25 Pfeilstörche have been documented in Germany. Pfeilstörche were crucial in understanding the migration of European birds.

The first and most famous Pfeilstorch was a white stork found in 1822 near the German village of Klütz, at the time in the Grand Duchy of Mecklenburg-Schwerin (nowadays in the state of Mecklenburg-Vorpommern). It was carrying a 75-centimetre (30 in) spear from central Africa in its neck. The specimen was subsequently stuffed and can be seen today in the zoological collection of the University of Rostock. It is therefore referred to as the Rostocker Pfeilstorch.

Before migration was understood, people struggled to explain the sudden annual disappearance of birds such as the white stork and barn swallow. Besides migration, some theories of the time held that they turned into other kinds of birds, mice, or hibernated underwater during the winter, and such theories were even propagated by zoologists of the time. The Rostocker Pfeilstorch in particular proved that birds migrate long distances to wintering grounds.

Ernst Schüz documented a number of birds with arrows stuck in them: a white-bellied stork collected in Tanganyika, a short-toed eagle in Hungary, a honey buzzard in Finland, and a black kite. He also reported swans and eiders with Inuit arrows. He noted in 1969 that sightings of birds with embedded arrows had declined because of the "unfortunate" replacement of bows and arrows with firearms.
