= University of Rostock =

Public university in Rostock, Germany

- Universität Rostock
- Seal of the university
- Latin: Universitas Rostochiensis
- Motto: Traditio et Innovatio
- Motto in English: Tradition and Innovation
- Type: Public
- Established: 13 February 1419; 607 years ago
- Affiliations: EUA; DFG; DAAD
- Budget: EUR 214.4 million
- Chancellor: Jan Tamm
- Rector: Elizabeth Prommer (907th rector)
- Academic staff: 1,341
- Administrative staff: 963
- Students: 13,766
- Doctoral students: 1,322
- Location: Rostock, Mecklenburg-Vorpommern, Germany; 54°4′32″N 12°6′12″E
- Campus: Urban
- Nobel Laureates: 4
- Colours: Blue and Black
- Website: www.uni-rostock.de

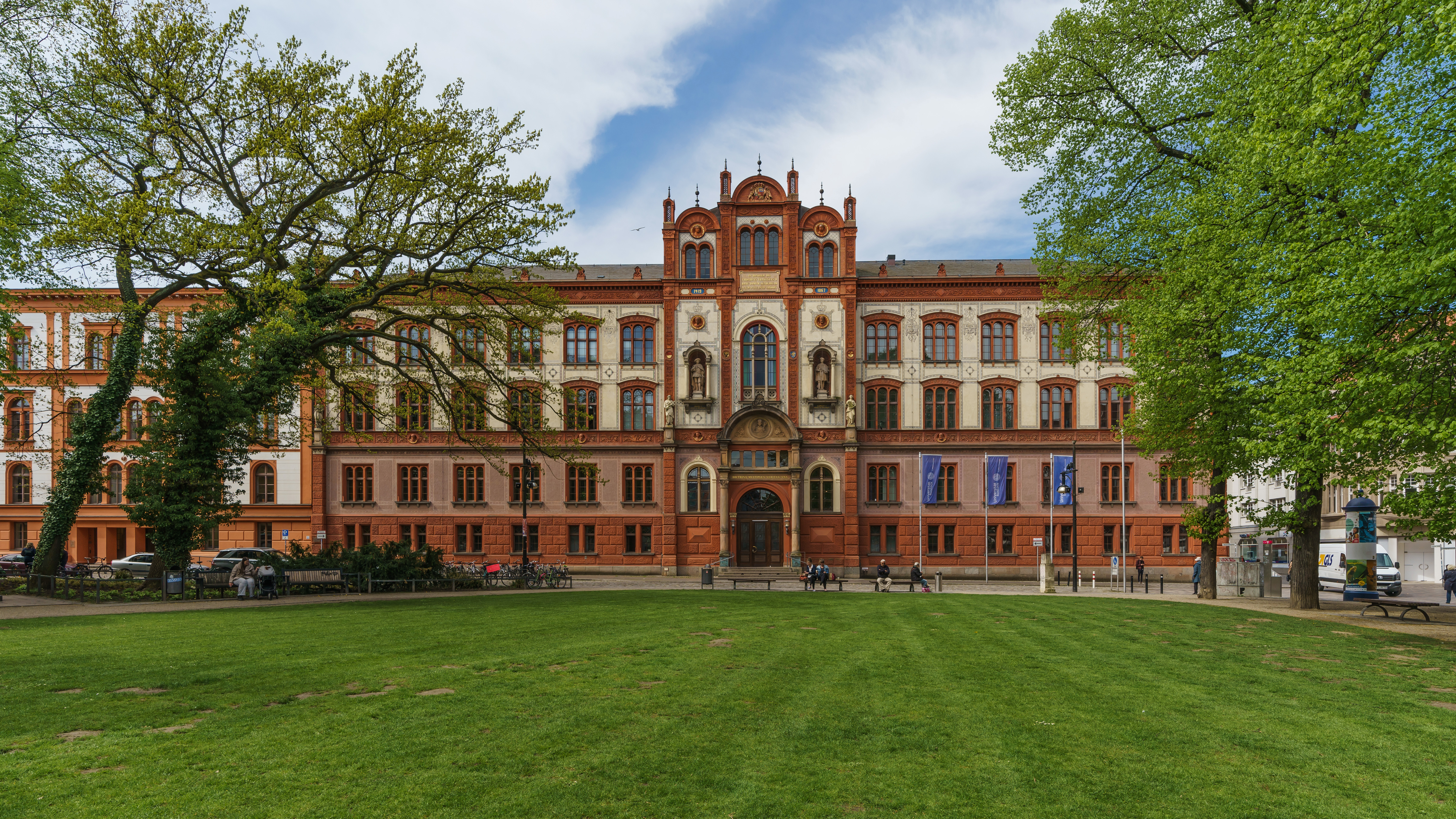
University of Rostock's main building

The University of Rostock (German: Universität Rostock) is a public university located in Rostock, Mecklenburg-Vorpommern, Germany. Founded in 1419, it is the third-oldest university in Germany. It is the oldest university in continental northern Europe and the Baltic Sea area, and 8th oldest in Central Europe. It was the 5th university established in the Holy Roman Empire.

The university has been associated with four Nobel laureates: Albrecht Kossel, Hans Spemann, Karl von Frisch and Otto Stern. It is a member of the European University Association. According to a ranking published by Times Higher Education in 2018, it is the most beautiful university in Germany and the fourth most beautiful university in all of Europe. The language of instruction is usually German, and English for some postgraduate studies.

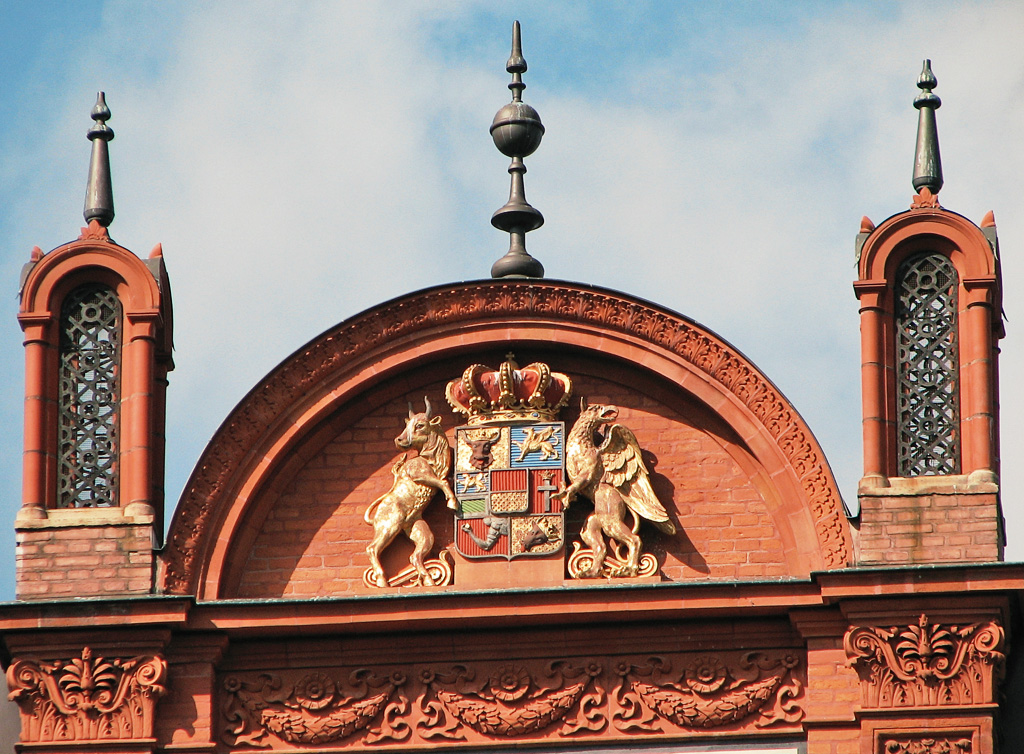
Detail of the central building depicting the coat of arms of Mecklenburg-Schwerin

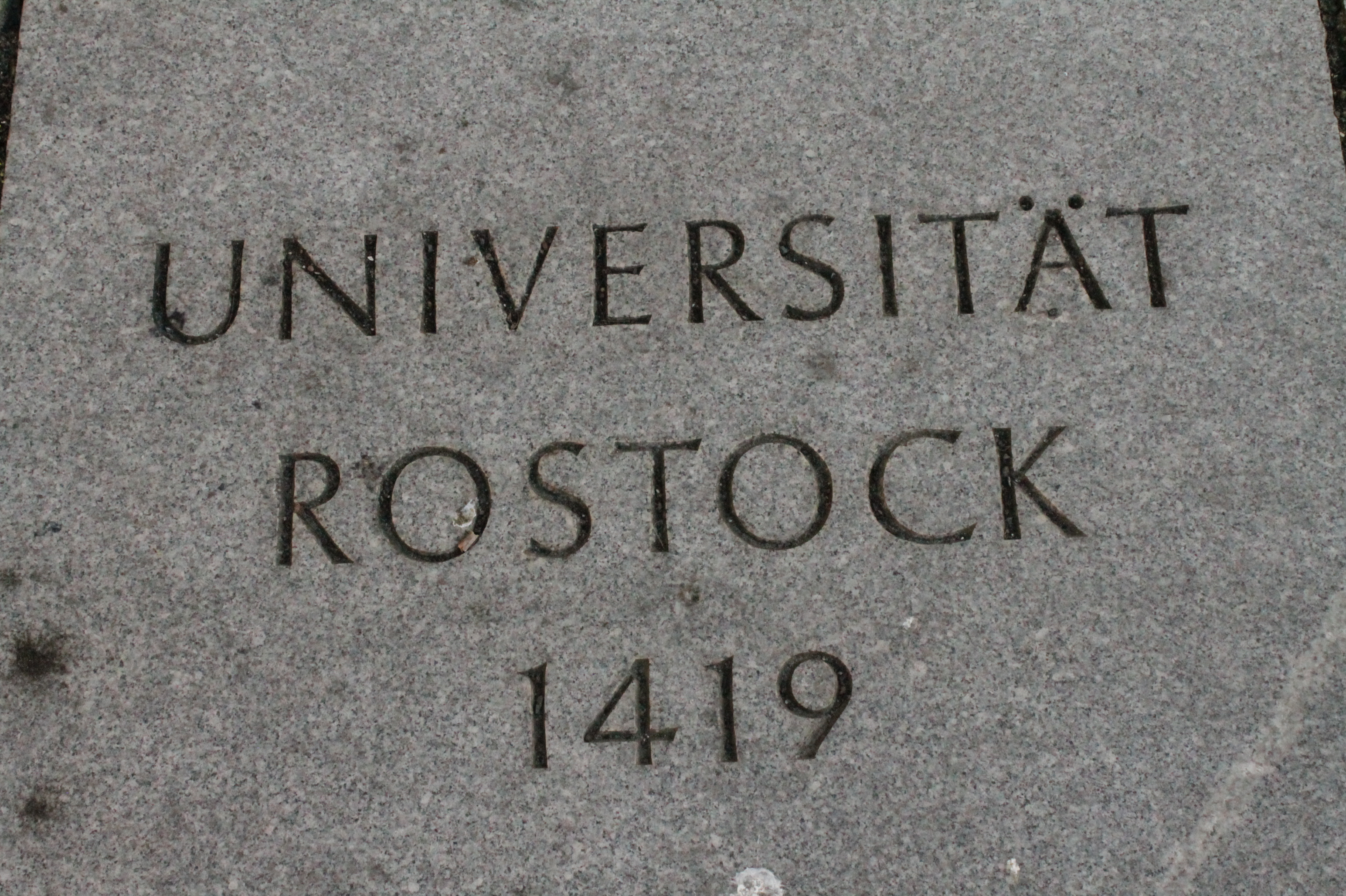
Memorial stone to the foundation of Rostock University, quadrangle of Wittenberg University

== History ==
=== 1419–1919 ===
The origins of the university date back to the Late Middle Ages, when the city of Rostock had achieved great prosperity through its membership of the Hanseatic League. The university was founded in 1419 by confirmation of Pope Martin V and thus is one of the oldest universities in Northern Europe.

In Germany, there are only five universities that were founded earlier, while only Heidelberg and Leipzig operated continuously since then: Heidelberg (1386), Cologne (1388/1919), Erfurt (1392/1994), Würzburg (1402/1582) and Leipzig (1409). That makes Rostock University the third oldest German university in continuous operation.

Throughout the 15th and 16th centuries, the University of Rostock had about 500 students each year and was among the most important universities in Germany and Northern Europe at the time, with many of its students originating from the Low Countries, Scandinavia or other countries bordering the Baltic Sea.

In the course of political struggles and due to pressure from the church, the university moved to Greifswald in 1437 and remained there until 1443. From 1487 to 1488 teaching took place in Lübeck. A few years after the city of Rostock, the university became Protestant in 1542. Henceforth, Humanism and Lutheranism were defining characteristics of the university.

In the 16th century, Rostock was the first university to teach Copernicanism, which was introduced by Professor Duncan Liddel. After the Thirty Years' War (1618–1648), however, for about two centuries the University of Rostock played only a regional role. After the "ownership" of the university had moved from the city to the state (Grand Duchy of Mecklenburg-Schwerin) in 1827, however, things changed for the better. The second half of the 19th century saw generous building activity in Rostock's alma mater and the university soon regained its old reputation amongst German universities.

=== 1919 to present ===
On the occasion of the 500th anniversary of the university, Albert Einstein and Max Planck received honorary doctorates on 12 November 1919. This made the University of Rostock the world's first institute of higher learning to award this honour to Einstein. The doctorate was not revoked during the Nazi rule in Germany (1933–1945), despite such orders by the Nazis. The reason for this remains unknown. Psychologist David Katz and professor of dentistry and dean of the medical faculty Hans Moral lost their posts in 1933 among others.

The end of the Second World War in 1945 brought many changes. The university, now finding itself in the Soviet Zone of Germany (the later German Democratic Republic), was re-opened on 24 February 1946. The Faculty of Law was closed in 1951, a Faculty of Agriculture was introduced in 1950 and in 1951 saw the opening of a Department of Shipbuilding (renamed Faculty of Technology in 1963). The University of Rostock was the first traditional university in Germany to open a technical faculty. In 1952, the Faculty of Aviation was opened, but eventually relocated to Dresden.

In 1976 the university was renamed Wilhelm-Pieck-Universität after Wilhelm Pieck, the first president of the German Democratic Republic. The renaming was annulled after the German reunification.

External funding increased by 83 % between 2005 and 2010 alone and currently is above 65 million euros per year. Over 500 million Euros have been invested in the university infrastructure since 1991, reaching 750 million euros by 2015. The numbers of young people from Germany and of international students who choose Rostock as a place to study are increasing every year. As of today [when?], students from at least 99 different countries have studied at Rostock. In 2007, the University of Rostock reorganized its research capacities into three profile lines: Life, Light & Matter, Maritime Systems, and Aging of Individuals and Societies. In 2010, a fourth profile was added, called Knowledge – Culture – Transformation.

== Organization and structure ==
Like many continental European universities, the University of Rostock is divided into academic faculties (German: Fakultät). Those can be sub-divided into academic departments (German: Institut) and chairs (German: Lehrstuhl).

=== Faculties ===
It is divided into the following nine faculties:

- Faculty of Agricultural and Environmental Sciences
  - Plants and Soil
  - Ecology and (Coastal)-Landscape
  - Biomass, Aqua and Livestock Sciences
- Faculty of Computer Science and Electrical Engineering
  - Institute of Computer Science
  - Institute for Visual and Analytic Computing
  - Institute of Electrical Engineering
  - Department of Computational Engineering
- Faculty of Law
  - Department of Law
  - International Commercial Law
  - International Business Administration
- Faculty of Mechanical Engineering and Marine Technology
  - Mechanical Engineering
  - Marine Technology
  - Mechatronics
  - Biomedical Technology
- Faculty of Mathematics and Natural Sciences
  - Institute of Biology
  - Institute of Chemistry
  - Institute of Mathematics
  - Institute of Physics
- Interdisciplinary Faculty
  - Department of Life, Light and Matter
  - Department of Maritime Systems
  - Department of Knowledge – Culture – Transformation
  - Department of Ageing of Individuals and Society
- Faculty of Medicine
  - Albrecht Kossel Institute for Neuroregeneration
  - General Medicine
  - Dental Medicine
  - Anatomy
  - Medical Biotechnology
  - Informatics in Medicine and Gerontology
  - Diagnostic and Interventional Radiology
  - Experimental Surgery
  - History of Medicine
  - Immunology
  - Clinical Chemistry and Laboratory Medicine
  - Medical Biochemistry and Molecular Biology
  - Medical Biology
  - Medical Genetics
  - Medical Microbiology
  - Medical Psychology and Sociology
  - Pathology
  - Pharmacology and Toxicology
  - Physiology
  - Proteome Center Rostock
  - Forensic Medicine
  - Transfusion Medicine
  - Institute of Experimental Gene Therapy and Tumor Research
  - Cell Biology
- Faculty of Theology
  - Institute of Image Theory
  - Institute of Text and Culture
- Faculty of Humanities
  - Institute of General and Social Pedagogy
  - Institute of Educational Psychology Rosa and David Katz
  - Institute for School Pedagogy and Educational Research
  - Institute for Elementary School Pedagogy
  - Institute for Special Education Development and Rehabilitation
  - Institute for Vocational Education
  - Institute for English/American Studies
  - Institute for German Studies
  - Institute for Romance Studies
  - Heinrich Schliemann Institute of Classical Studies
  - Historical Institute
  - Institute for Media Research
  - Institute of Philosophy
  - Institute of Sports Science
  - Wossidlo Research Center for European Ethnology/Folklore
  - Moritz Schlick Research Center
  - Uwe Johnson Research Center
  - Research and Documentation Center of the State of Mecklenburg-Western Pomerania on the History of Dictatorships in Germany
- Faculty of Economic and Social Sciences
  - Institute of Business Administration
  - Institute of Marketing and Services Research
  - Institute of Sociology and Demography
  - Institute of Political and Administrative Sciences
  - Institute of Economics

== Facilities ==
=== Rostock University Library ===
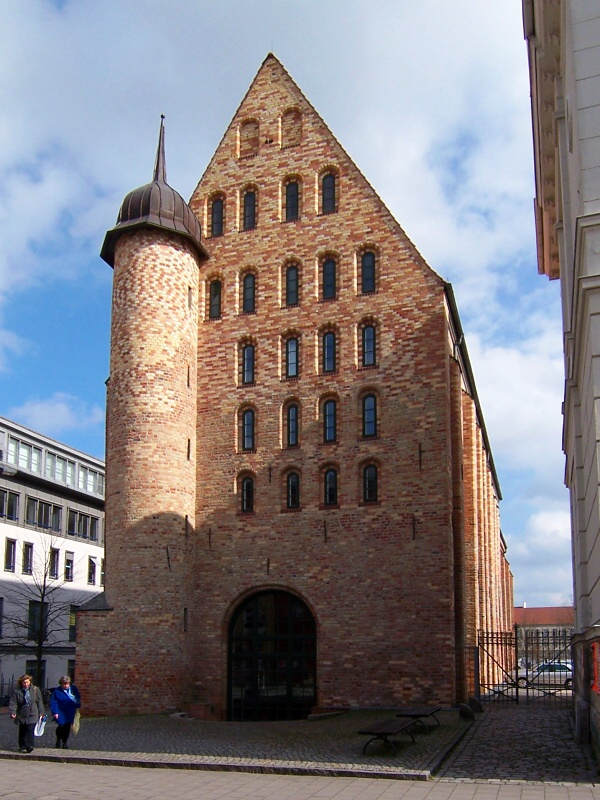
Michaeliskloster, part of the Rostock University Library (Special Historical Library Collections)

The Rostock University Library consists of 3 divisional libraries and several specialized libraries provides scientific literature and information for research, education and study. The university statistics shows about 3 million physical volumes recorded in the catalogue. It provides access to electronic journals (EZB) and specialized databases (DBIS). The library possesses large special collections of culturally historical and scientifically historical old books. In the Patents and Standards Centre (PNZ), all DIN norms and regulations as well as the VDI guidelines are provided. Moreover, the library also contains the university archive and the art treasure collection.

=== Rostock Student Services ===
The Rostock Student Services (German: Studentenwerk Rostock) provides accommodation for newly arrived international students who plan to study at the University of Rostock and the Rostock University of Music and Theatre. International students, who have not lived or studied in Germany, are considered for a Starter Package service. However, short-time students and students on a programme (ERASMUS; Sokrates) are given a low priority.

=== Rostock University Hospital ===
The university operates a hospital, which has several teaching and research institutes. Among those are the Albrecht Kossel Institute for Neuroregeneration.

== Points of interest ==
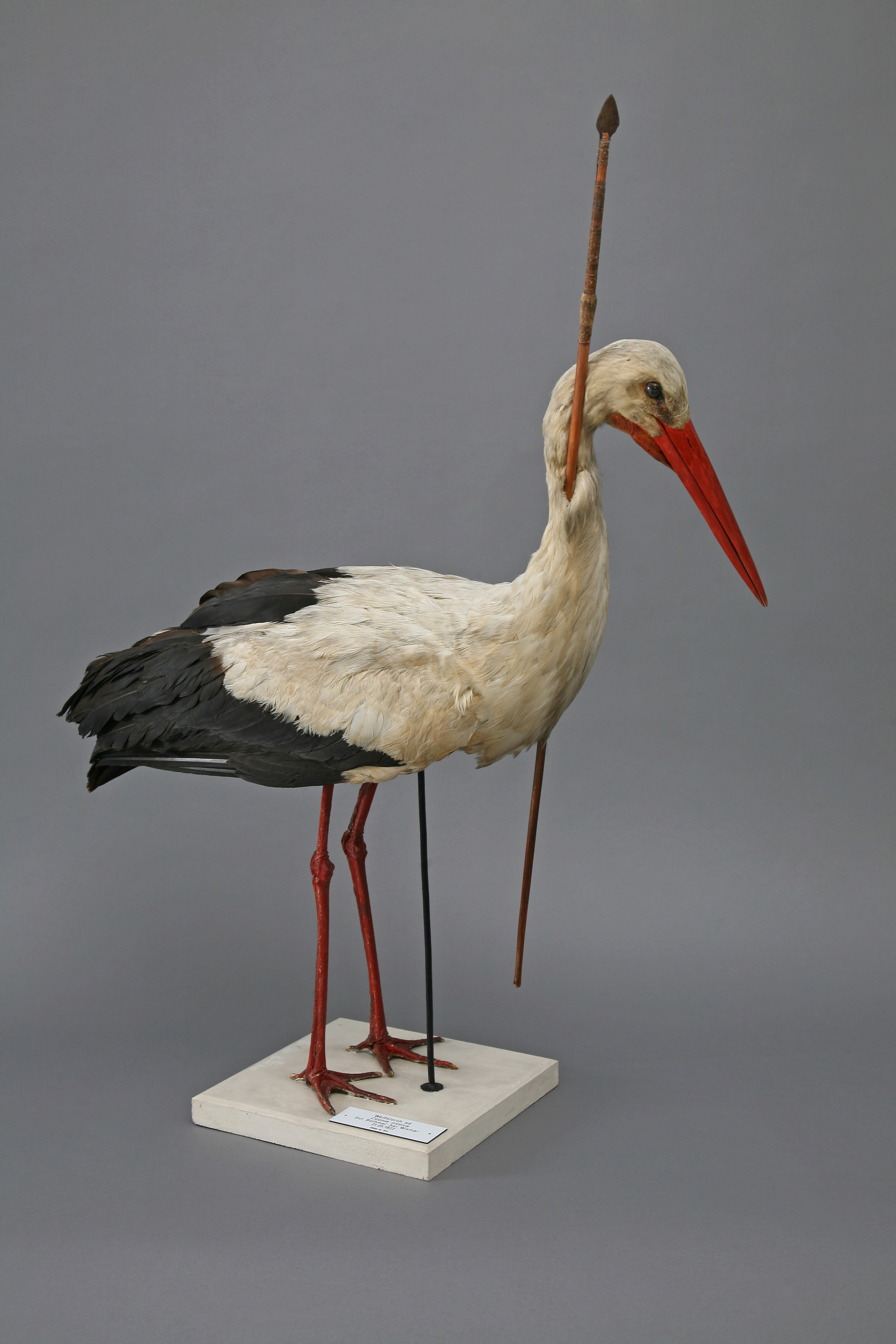
The Rostocker Pfeilstorch, on display at the Institute of Zoology

- Botanischer Garten Universität Rostock, the university's botanical garden
- Zoological Collection Rostock, founded in 1775 by Oluf Gerhard Tychsen. Parts of the collection are open to the public.
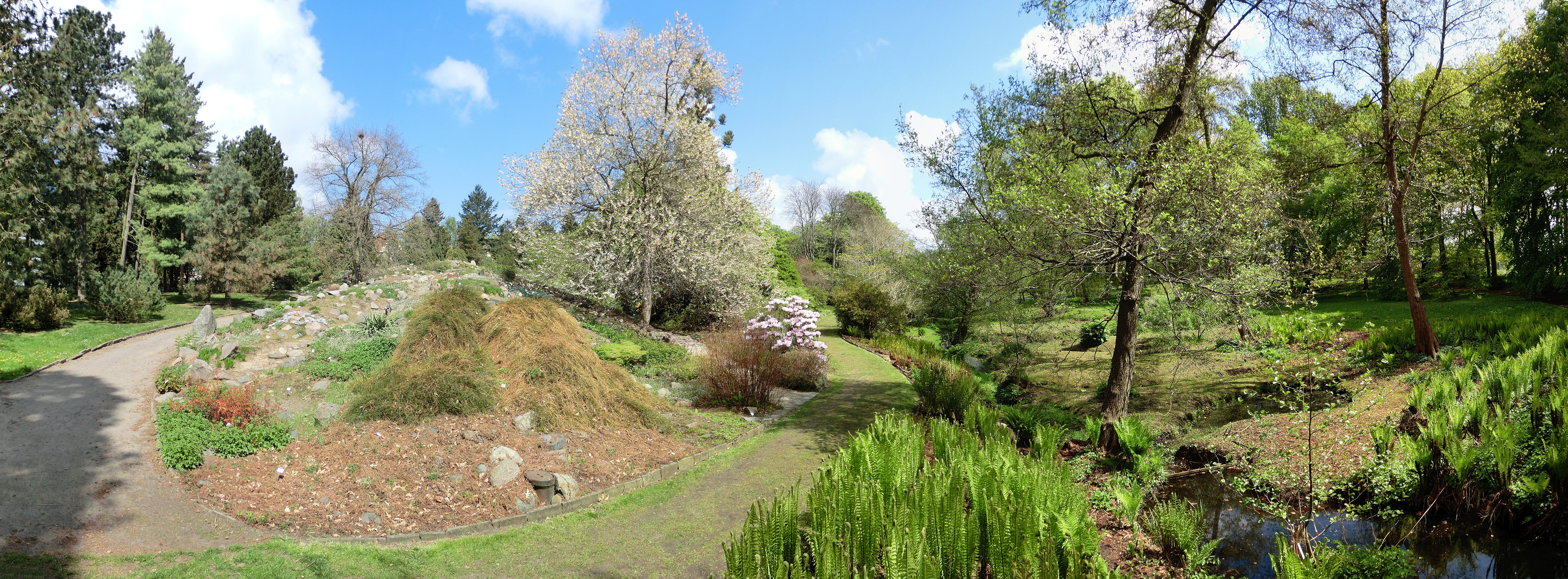
Botanical Garden of Rostock University, greenhouse

== Academic profile ==
=== Rankings ===
University rankings

Overall – Global & National
QS World 2024	761–770	40–41
ARWU World 2023	501–600	32–36

According to the 2024 QS World University Rankings, the university is globally positioned in the 761–770 range, while it ranks 40–41st nationally. On the other hand, the 2023 ARWU World rankings place the institution in the 501–600 category globally and 32–36th at the national level.

ARWU ranked University of Rostock among 101–150 in Chemistry in the world in 2014. In 2014, the CWTS Leiden Ranking ranked University of Rostock in the world as 269th in Natural Sciences, 336th in Life Sciences, 463rd in Medical Sciences, 449th in Mathematics, Computer Science and Engineering, and 245th in Cognitive Science. According to the University Ranking by Academic Performance (URAP), Rostock University was ranked 224th worldwide in Chemistry in 2014.

The CWTS Leiden Ranking ranked University of Rostock as 405th in 2014.

In 2014, the Center for World University Rankings (CWUR) ranked University of Rostock as 481st in the world.

According to the University Ranking by Academic Performance (URAP), Rostock University was ranked as 34th in Germany and 428th in the world in 2014.

=== Research ===
In recent years, the University of Rostock has undergone significant conceptual and organisational changes, which included the bundling of competences and research activities in the interdisciplinary, cross-faculty departments of the Interdisciplinary Faculty. Scientific priorities of the faculties have improved by including the interdisciplinary-based research units: Collaborative Research Centres, Research Training Groups, and Research Units.

The university cooperates with several independent research centres. Among those:

- Leibniz Institute of Atmospheric Physics, Kühlungsborn (IAP)
- Leibniz Institute for Catalysis (LIKAT)
- Leibniz Institute for Baltic Sea Research, Warnemünde (IOW)
- Leibniz Institute for Farm Animal Biology, Dummerstorf
- Max Planck Institute for Demographic Research
- Fraunhofer Institute for Computer Graphics Research, Department Rostock (IGD)
- Fraunhofer Application Centre Large Structures in Production Engineering (AGP)
- Hanseatic Institute for Entrepreneurship and Regional Development at the University of Rostock (HIE-RO)
- Institute for Implant Technology and Biomaterials
- Institute of banking law and bank management
- Reference- and Translation Center for Cardiac Stem Cell Therapy
- Rostock Center for the Study of Demographic Change
- Faculty of Interdisciplinary Research (INF)
- Center for Life Science Automation (CELISCA)
- Centre of Teacher training and Educational research
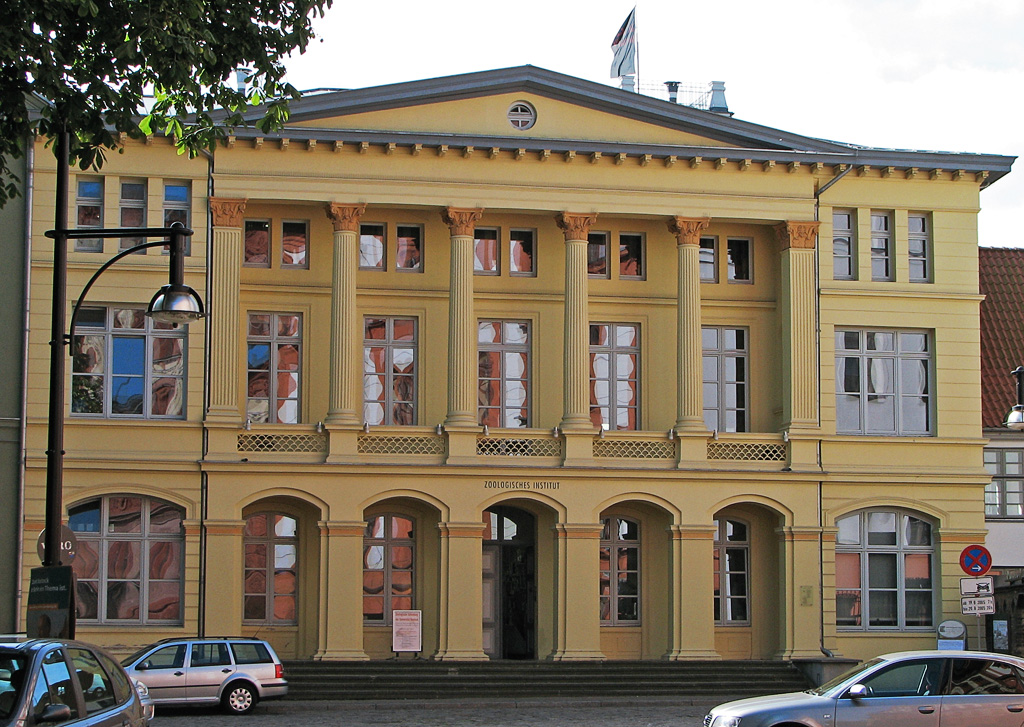
Institute of Zoology (Zoologisches Institut)

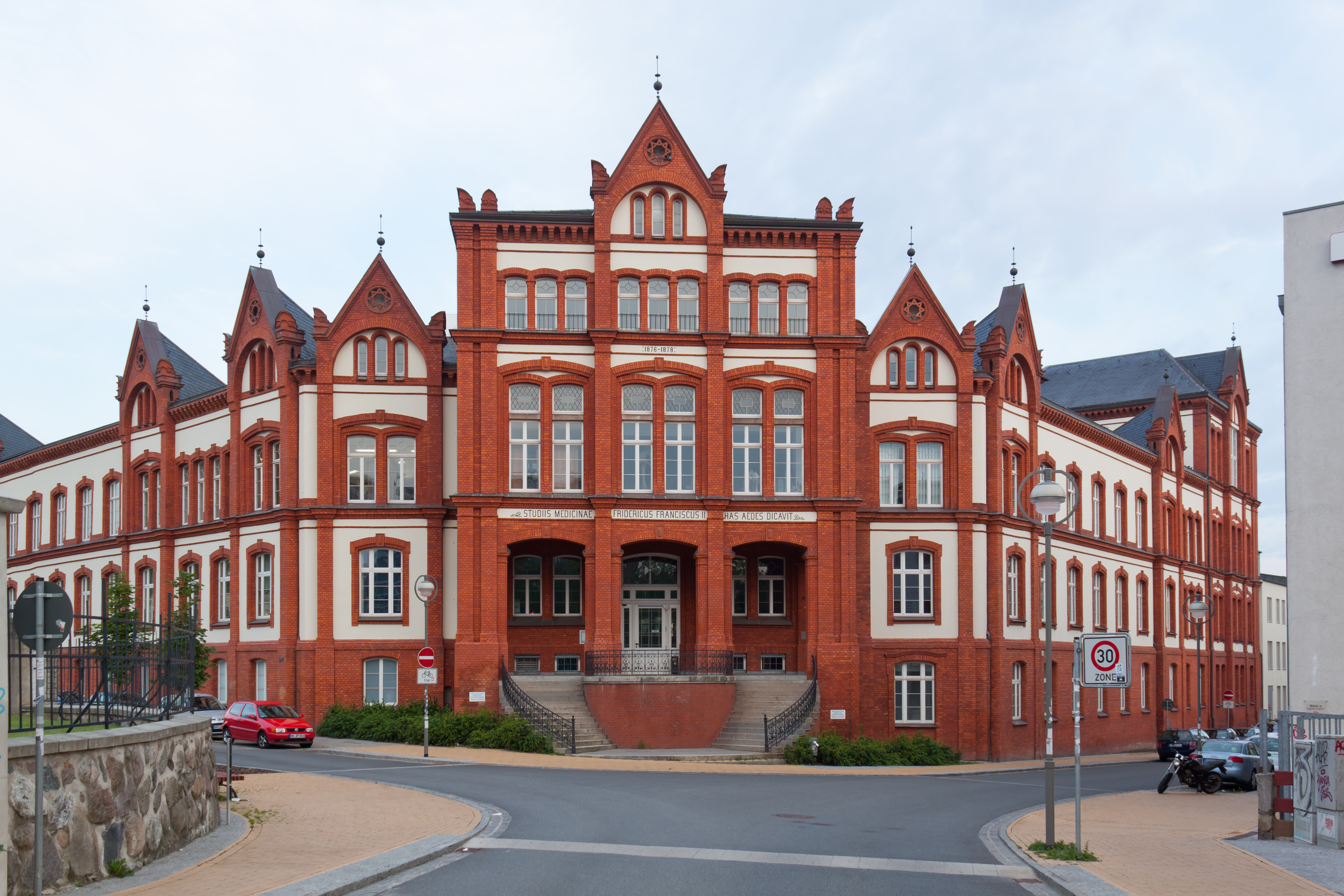
Institute of Anatomy (Anatomisches Institut)

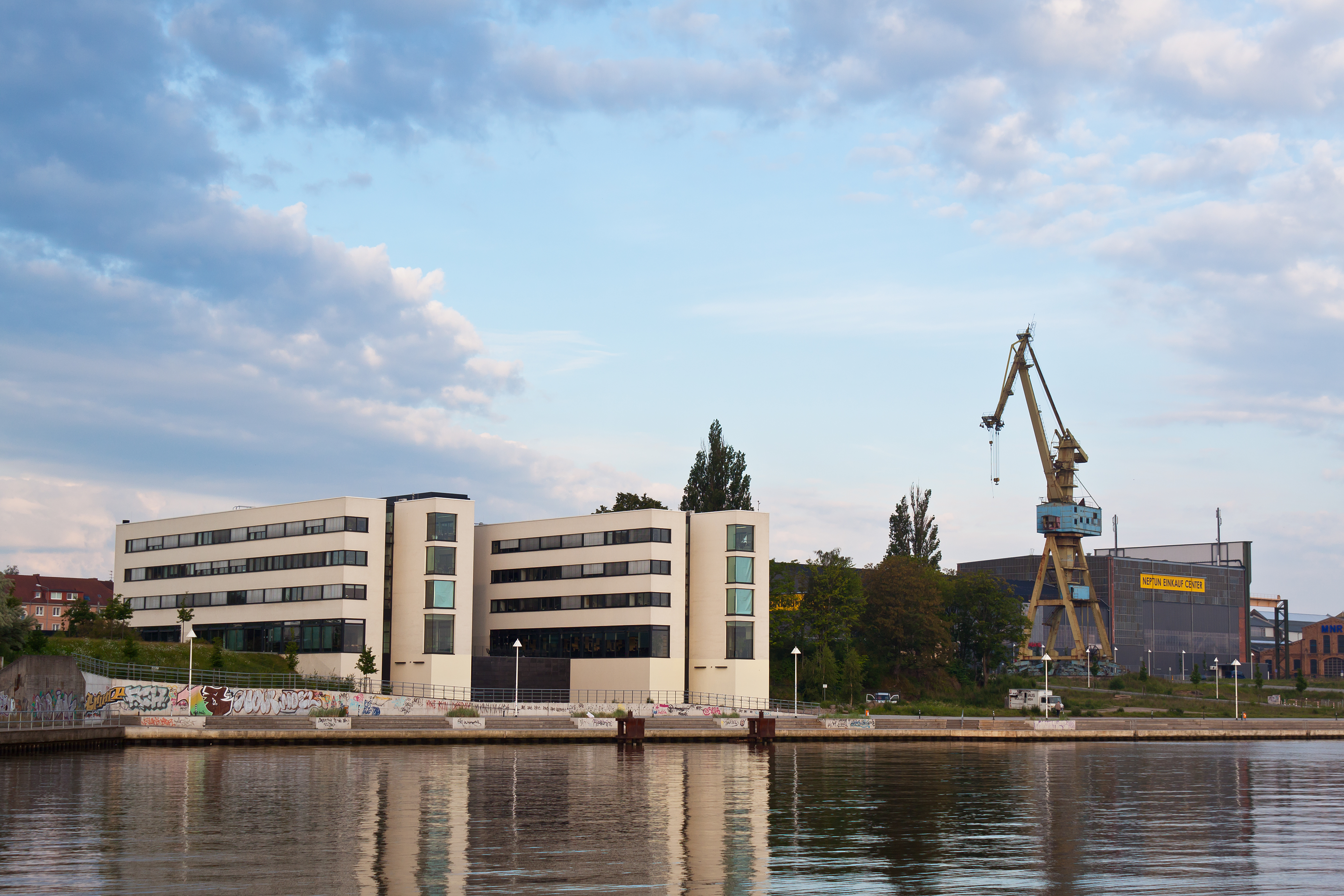
Building of the Max Planck Institute for Demographic Research in Rostock

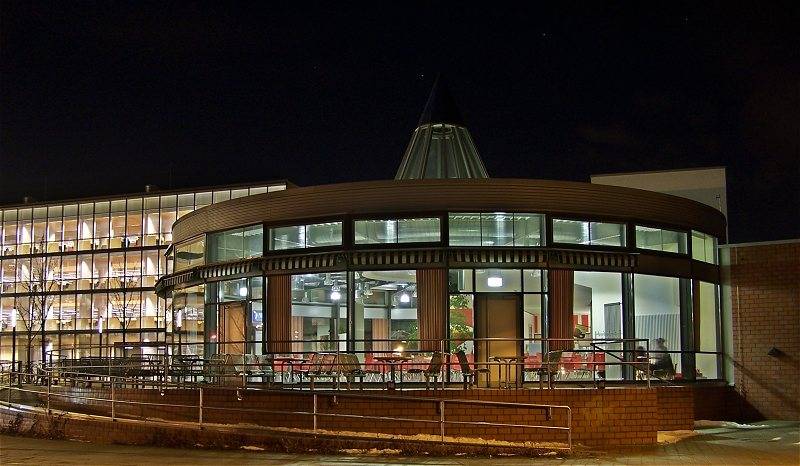
University Restaurant and Cafeteria

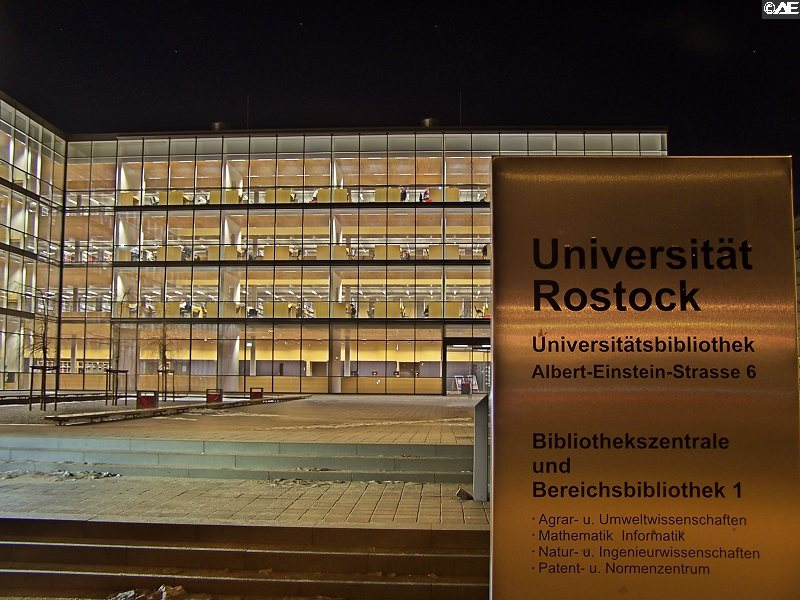
University Library

== Partner universities ==
Although cooperation and student exchanges are possible with many more institutions, the university has signed cooperation agreements with the following international universities:

Europe

- Charles University in Prague, Czech Republic
- University of Zagreb, Croatia
- University of Copenhagen, Denmark
- University of Turku, Finland
- University of Nantes, France
- University of Latvia, Latvia
- Gdańsk University, Poland
- Saint Petersburg State University, Russia
- University of Kristianstad, Sweden
- (United Kingdom) Newcastle University, UK

World

- National University of La Plata, Argentina
- Memorial University of Newfoundland, Canada
- University of Saskatchewan, Canada
- University of Guelph, Canada
- Science University of Tokyo, Japan
- North-West University, South Africa
- University of Georgia, United States
- Brown University, United States
- University of Utah, United States
- Arab International University (AIU), Syria
- University of Wyoming, United States
- University of Alabama in Huntsville, United States

== Notable alumni and faculty ==
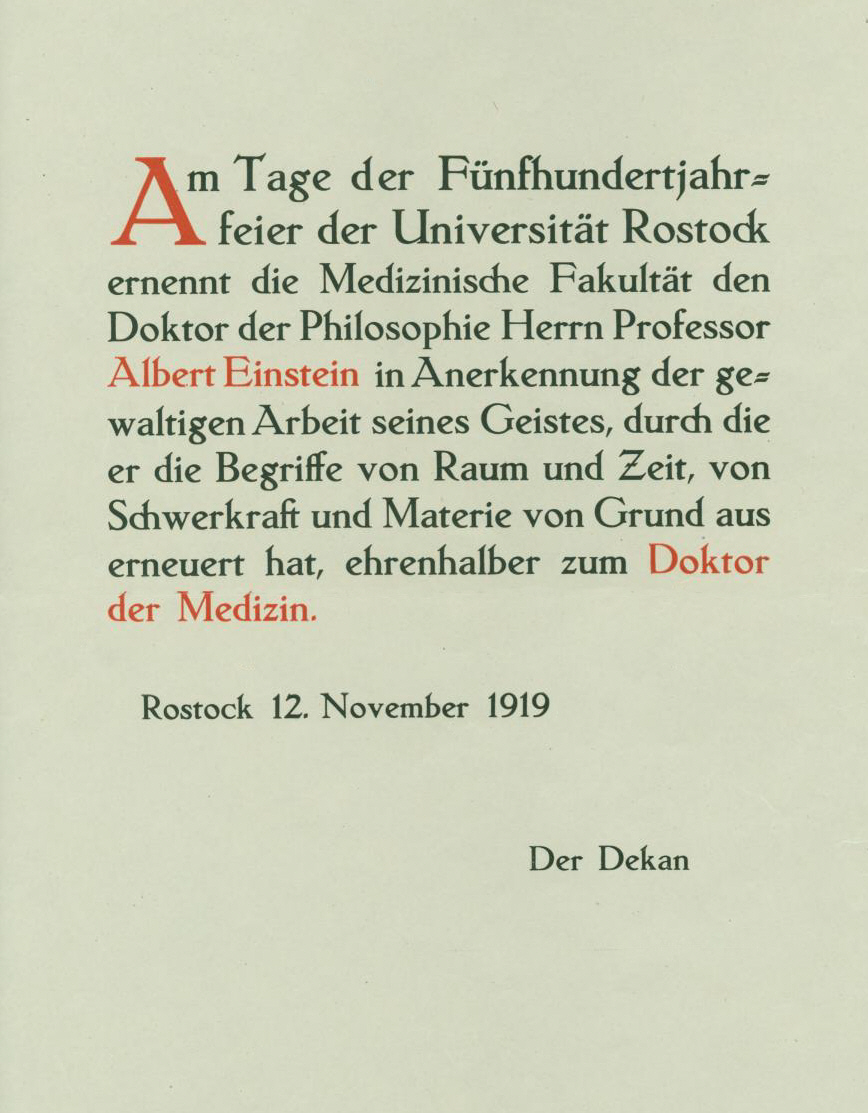
Honorary doctorate certificate of Rostock University to Albert Einstein in 1919

The University History Research Center publishes the Catalogus Professorum Rostochiensium (CPR), a freely accessible online catalogue that attempts to include all professors at the University of Rostock from 1419 to the present. Each entry documents a professor's biographical data and scientific achievements and is linked with further digitized resources such as photographs or handwritten documents. The project has not yet been finished.

In nearly six centuries numerous notable students and professors have had ties with the university, for instance:

- Konrad Gesselen (1409–1469), from Geismar, Hesse, astronomer, mathematician, pastor, taught at Rostock and Thorn, wrote Cisiojanus
- Hans Teiste, 29th Bishop of Bergen, Norway (Magister in 1468)
- Hoskuld Hoskuldsson, 28th and last Roman Catholic Bishop of Stavanger (Magister in 1493)
- Mogens Lauritssøn, 27th and last Roman Catholic Bishop of Hamar (Magister in 1494)
- Ulrich von Hutten (1488–1523), humanist, wrote his first important opus in Rostock in 1509
- Olaus Magnus (1490–1557), Swedish humanist, ethnologist and cartographer
- Olav Engelbrektsson, 28th and last Roman Catholic Archbishop of Nidaros (Baccalaureus in 1505, Magister in 1507)
- Levinus Battus (1545–1591), physician (MA in 1559)
- David Chyträus (1530–1600), theologian, education policy maker and historian, Professor of Theology since 1561
- Tycho Brahe (1546–1601), Danish astronomer (studied in 1566)
- Axel Oxenstierna (1583–1654), Swedish chancellor, strategist and statesman (studied, 1599–1601)
- Joachim Jungius (1587–1657), mathematician, physicist and philosopher, Professor of Mathematics in Rostock from 1624 to 1628
- Johann Christopher Jauch (1669–1725), Superintendent of Lueneburg, poet who wrote baroque poems and song texts, studied theology until 1694
- Oluf Gerhard Tychsen (1734–1815), Orientalist and Hebrew scholar; taught at the University of Rostock from 1778
- Samuel Gottlieb Vogel (1750–1837), physician, Professor of Medicine in Rostock since 1789
- Lorenz Karsten (1751–1829), economist and agricultural economist
- Johann Heinrich Friedrich Link (1767–1850), natural scientist, Professor of Chemistry, Zoology and Phytology from 1792 to 1811
- Johann Heinrich von Thünen (1783–1850), economist and social reformer (Dr. h.c. in 1830)
- Ferdinand Kämmerer (1784–1841), jurist, professor from 1816
- Carl Friedrich von Both (1789–1875), jurist, vice-chancellor of the University of Rostock, 1836 to 1870
- Fritz Reuter (1810–1874), novelist, studied law at the University of Rostock from 1831, received an honorary doctorate in 1863
- John Brinckman (1814–1870), poet, studied law at the University of Rostock from 1834 to 1838
- Carl Friedrich Wilhelm Brockmann, philosopher (PhD in 1848)
- Heinrich Schliemann (1822–1890), archaeologist (PhD in 1869)
- August Zillmer (1831–1893), actuary (PhD in 1858)
- Rudolf Berlin (1833–1897), physician, Professor of Ophthalmology, dean since 1895 and rector since 1897
- Hermann Roesler (1833–1897), physician, Professor of Ophthalmology, dean and rector
- Aaron J. Messing (1840–1916), rabbi
- Rudolph Sohm (1841–1917), lawyer and Church historian
- Albrecht Kossel (1853–1927), medical scientist and Nobel Prize laureate (PhD 1878)
- Eugen Geinitz (1854–1925), geologist and mineralogist, Professor of Mineralogy and Geology, Director of the Mineralogical-Geological Institute
- Isaac Rülf, philosopher, humanitarian organizer, author (PhD in 1865)
- Rudolf Steiner (1861–1925), Philosopher (Dr. phil. in 1891)
- Emil Mattiesen (1875–1939), composer, pianist and philosopher, Professor of church music from 1929
- Felix Genzmer (1878–1959), jurist and expert on Scandinavian studies, translator of the Edda songs, Professor of Public Law from 1920 to 1922
- Gustav Mie (1868–1957), physicist, studied physics at the University of Rostock from 1886 to 1889
- Moritz Schlick, (1882–1936), philosopher, habilitation in 1911, lecturer from 1911 to 1921, later initiator of the Viennese Circle; at the Institute of Philosophy of the Faculty of Humanities
- Viktor Schilling (1883–1960), physician, co-founder of Hematology, Head of the Rostock University Hospital
- David Katz (1884–1953), psychologist, from 1919 to 1933 associate professor, later professor, conferred to emeritus status by the National Socialists due to his Jewish origins
- Constantin Gane (1885–1962), lawyer, novelist and historian, active within the Romanian fascist Iron Guard (Doctor of Law in 1910)
- Hans Moral (1885–1933), from 1920 on international significant Associate Professor, later Professor of Dentistry, committed suicide after he was dismissed because of his Jewish origins; commemorative plaque in the foyer of the main university building
- Walter H. Schottky (1886–1976), physicist, Professor of theoretical Physics from 1923 to 1927
- Karl von Frisch (1886–1980), ethologist and Nobel laureate in medicine (zoology professor, 1921–1923)
- Otto Stern (1888–1969), Nobel laureate in physics, (experimental physics professor, 1921–1923)
- Albert Einstein, Nobel laureate in physics (Dr. h.c. in 1919)
- Max Planck, Nobel laureate in physics (Dr. h.c. in 1919)
- Kurt von Fritz (1900–1985), classical philologist, Professor of Greek Studies from 1933 to 1935
- Walter Hallstein (1901–1982), politician and jurist, first President of the European Commission, State Secretary in the German Chancellors Office and the Foreign Office (law professor 1930–1941)
- Pascual Jordan (1902–1980), physicist, co-founder of Quantum mechanics, later professor of Physics from 1929 to 1944
- Eugen Gerstenmaier (1906–1986), theologian and politician, member of the Kreisauer Circle, later President of the German Bundestag, Promotion at the Faculty of Theology in 1935
- Fritz Mertsch (1906–1971), statistician, studied politology, doctorate degree as Dr. rer. pol. in 1940
- Gonzalo Rojas (1917–2011), Chilean poet (professor, 1973–1975)
- Arno Esch (1928–1951), student and liberal politician, active member of the Liberal Democratic Party, condemned to death as declared opponent of communism; commemorative plaque in the foyer of the main university building
- Joachim Gauck, 11th President of Germany, studied theology in Rostock until 1965, honorary doctor in 1999
- Walter Kempowski (1929–2007), writer, honorary professor of Contemporary German Literature and Cultural History since 2003
- Hans Apel (1932–2011), politician, former Federal Minister of Finance, later Minister of Defense, Honorary professor of Financial Policy at the Faculty of Economic and Social Sciences since 1993
- Uwe Johnson (1934–1984), author, studied German language and literature at the University of Rostock from 1952 to 1956
- Hans-Joachim Schulze (born 1934), German Bach scholar
- Bettina Meyer, Antarctic researcher in marine biology, received her doctorate from the University of Rostock in 1996
- Viviana Simon, Professor of Microbiology, received her doctorate in 1997.
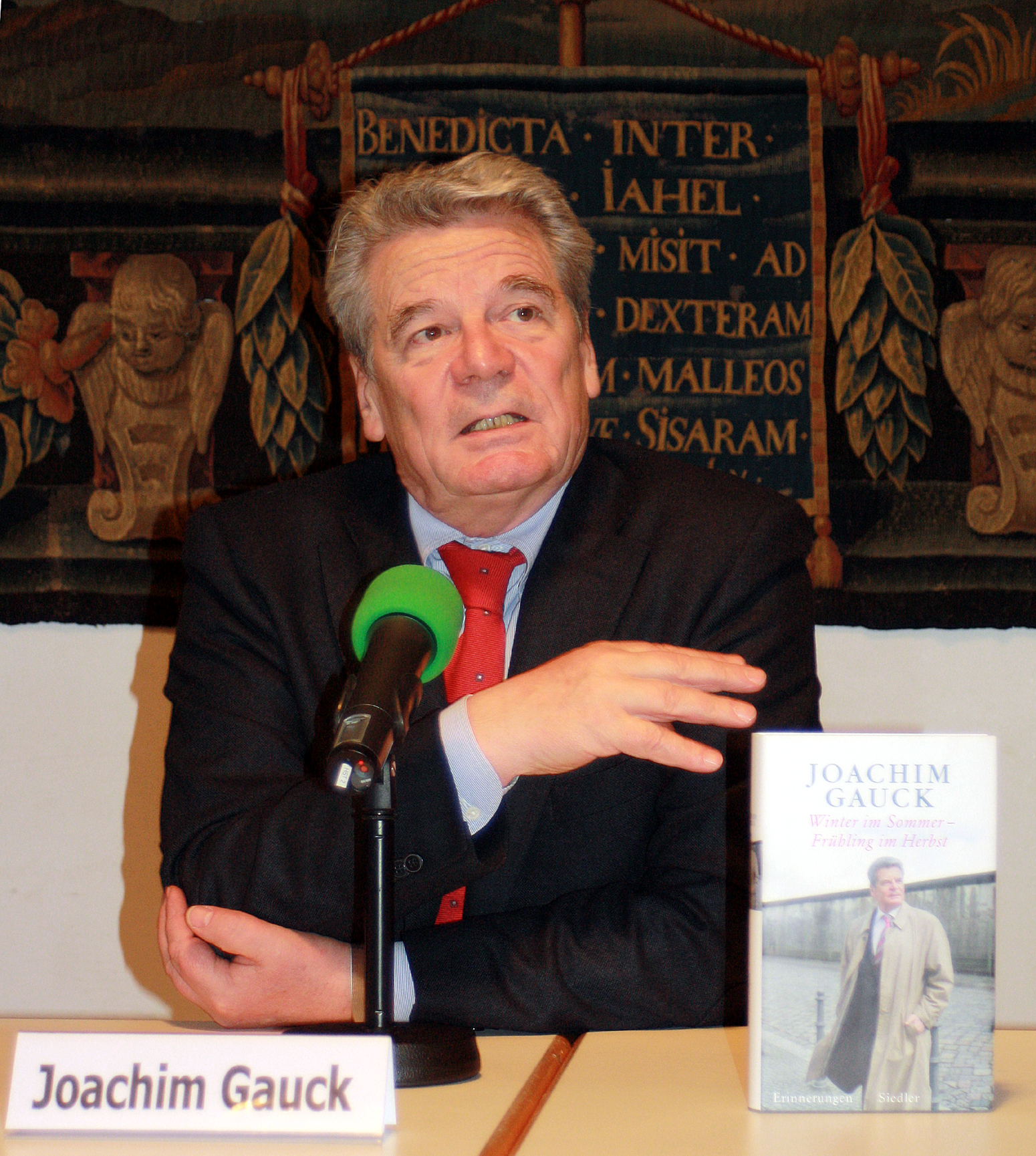
Joachim Gauck, former President of Germany (Dr. h.c. in 1999)

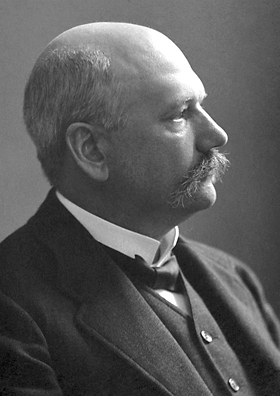
Albrecht Kossel, Nobel laureate in medicine, (Dr. med. in 1877)

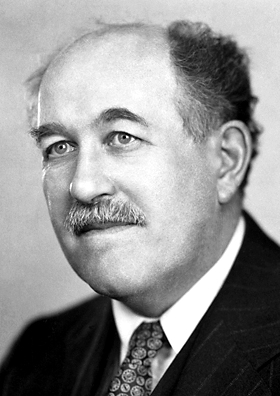
Otto Stern, Nobel laureate in physics (experimental physics professor, 1921–1923)

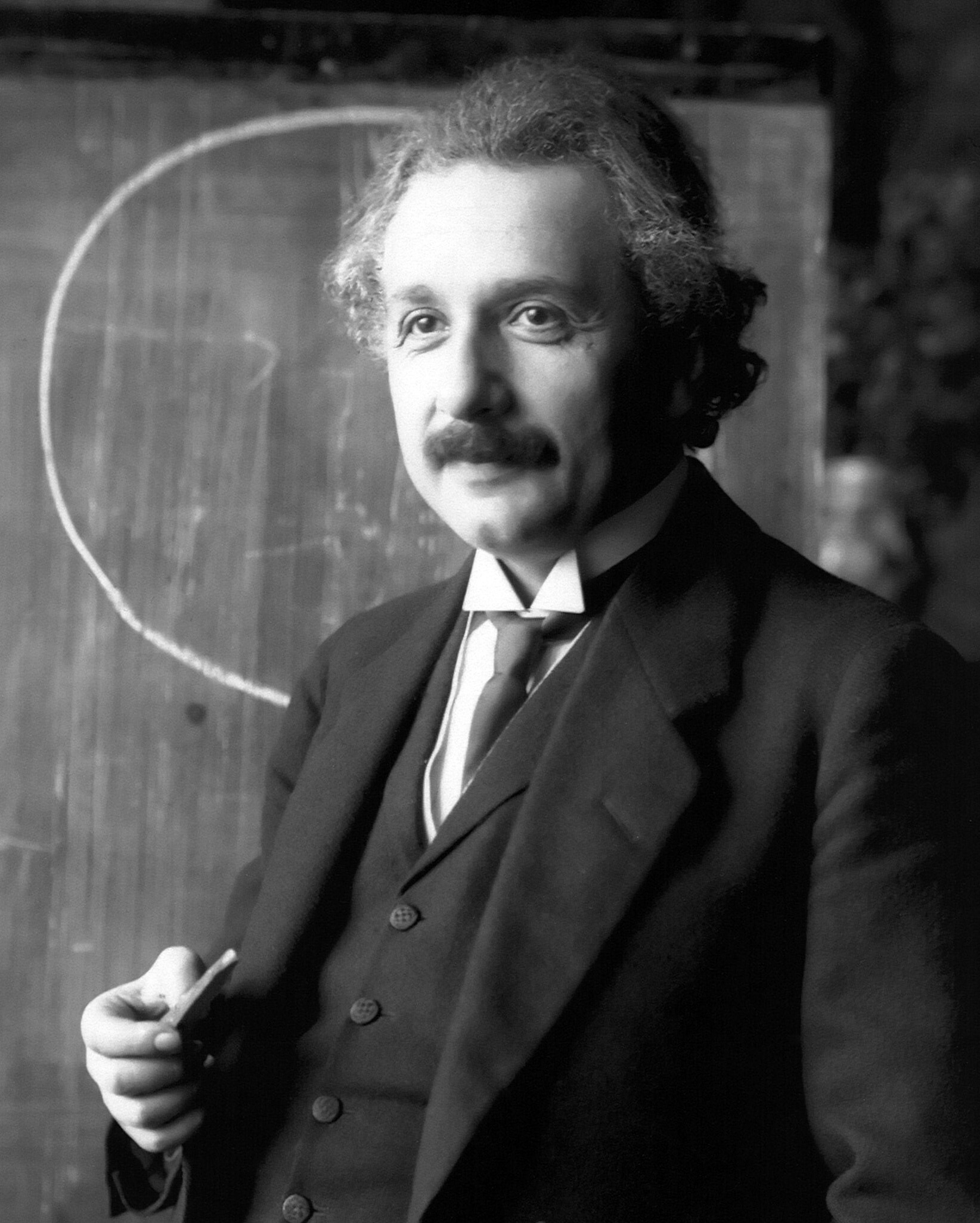
Albert Einstein, Nobel laureate in physics (Dr. h.c. in 1919)

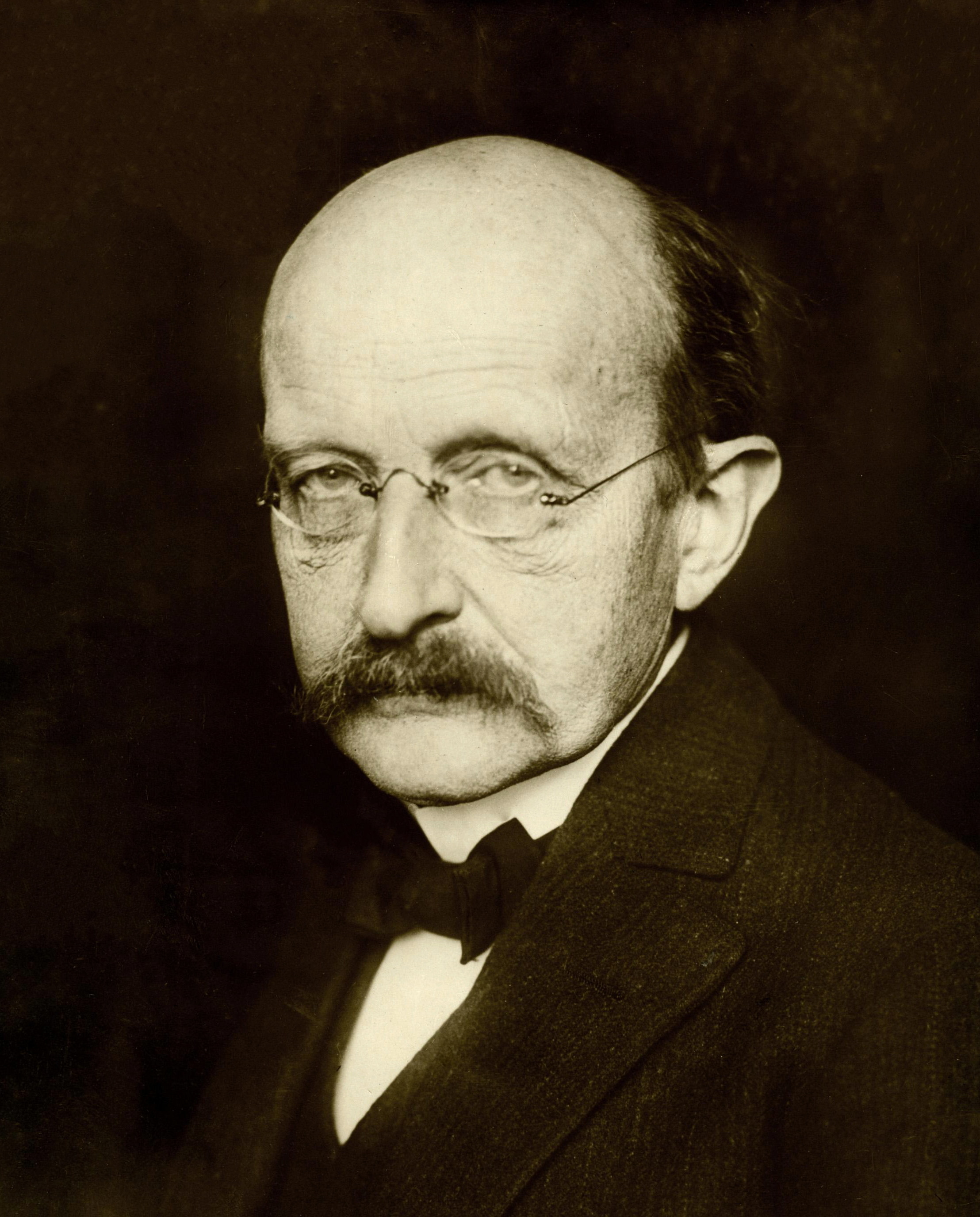
Max Planck, Nobel laureate in physics (Dr. h.c. in 1919)

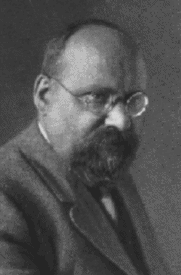
Gustav Mie, physicist (studied physics, 1886–1889)

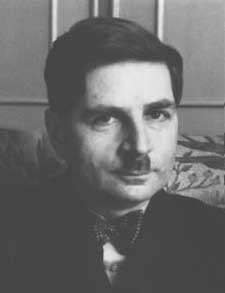
Walter H. Schottky, physicist (theoretical physics professor, 1923–1927)

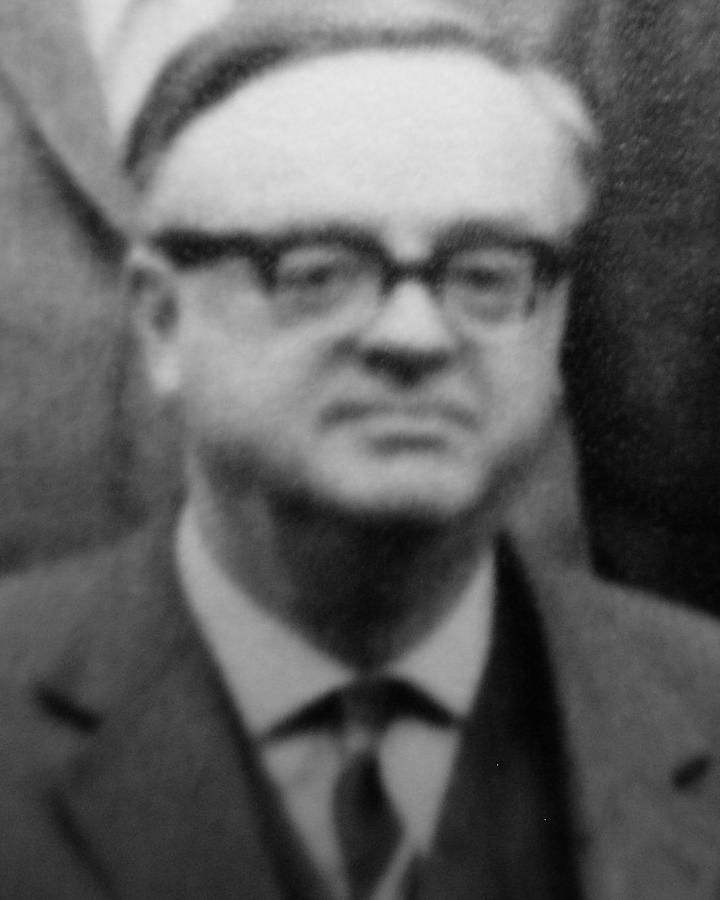
Pascual Jordan, physicist (theoretical physics professor, 1929–1944)

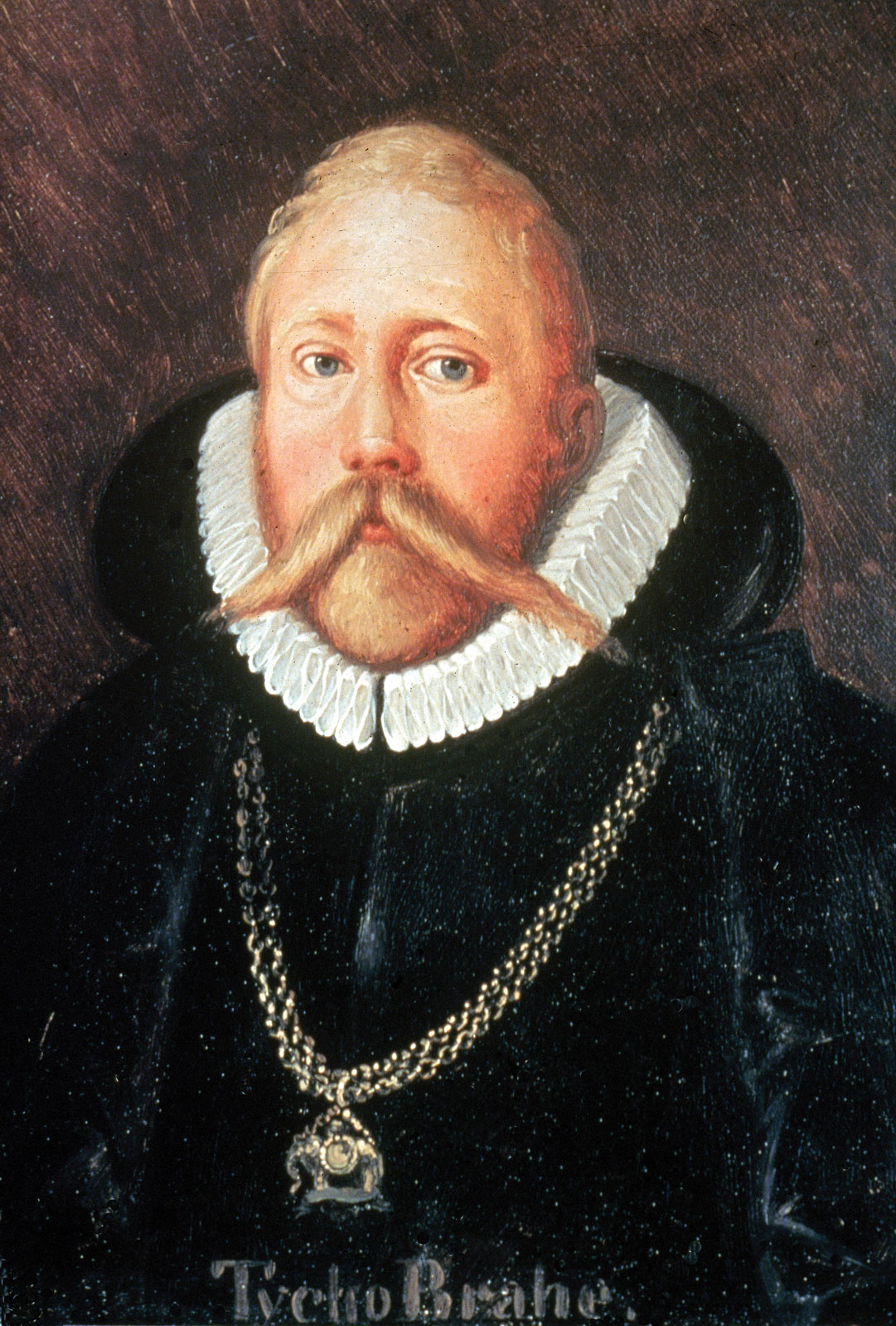
Tycho Brahe, Astronomer (studied in 1566)

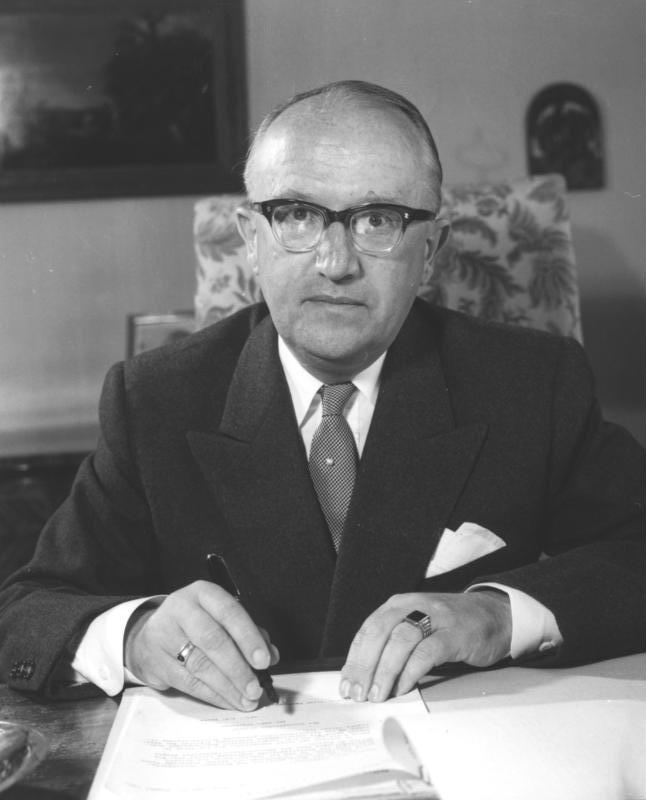
Walter Hallstein, first President of the European Commission (law professor, 1930–1941)

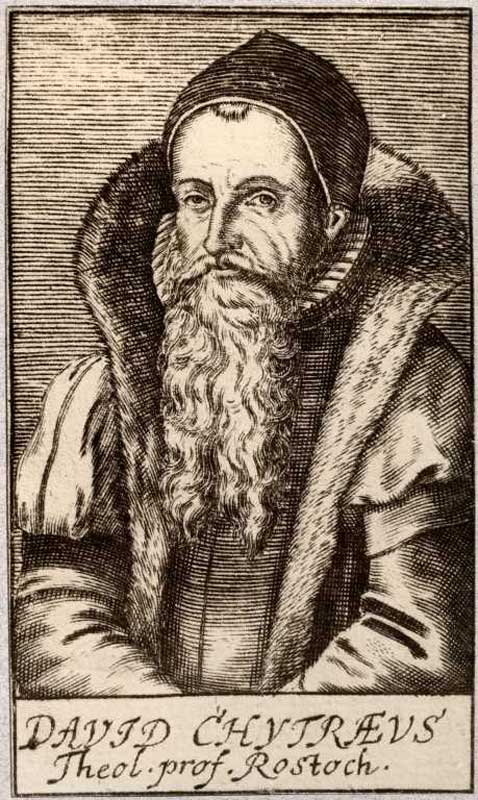
David Chyträus, Theologian (theology professor, 1561–1600)

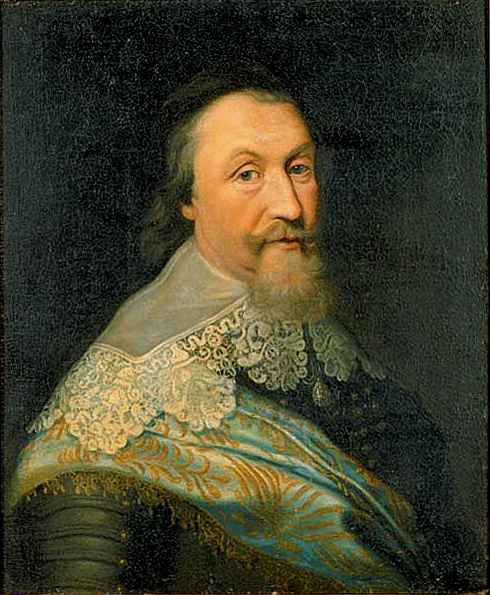
Axel Oxenstierna, Swedish chancellor (studied, 1599–1601)

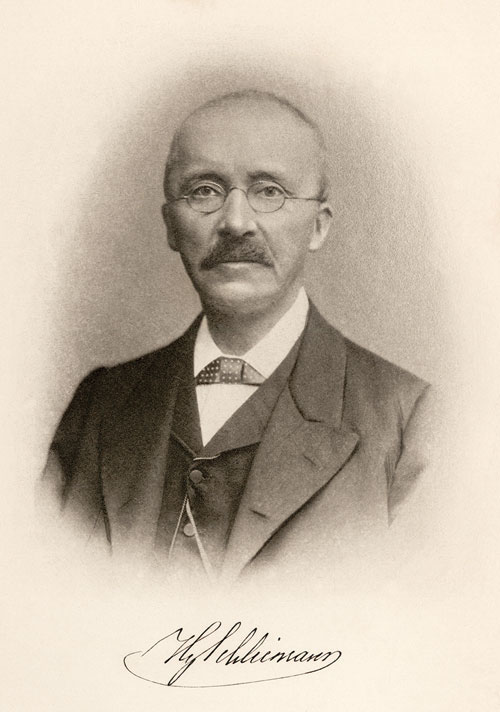
Heinrich Schliemann, archeologist (PhD in 1869)

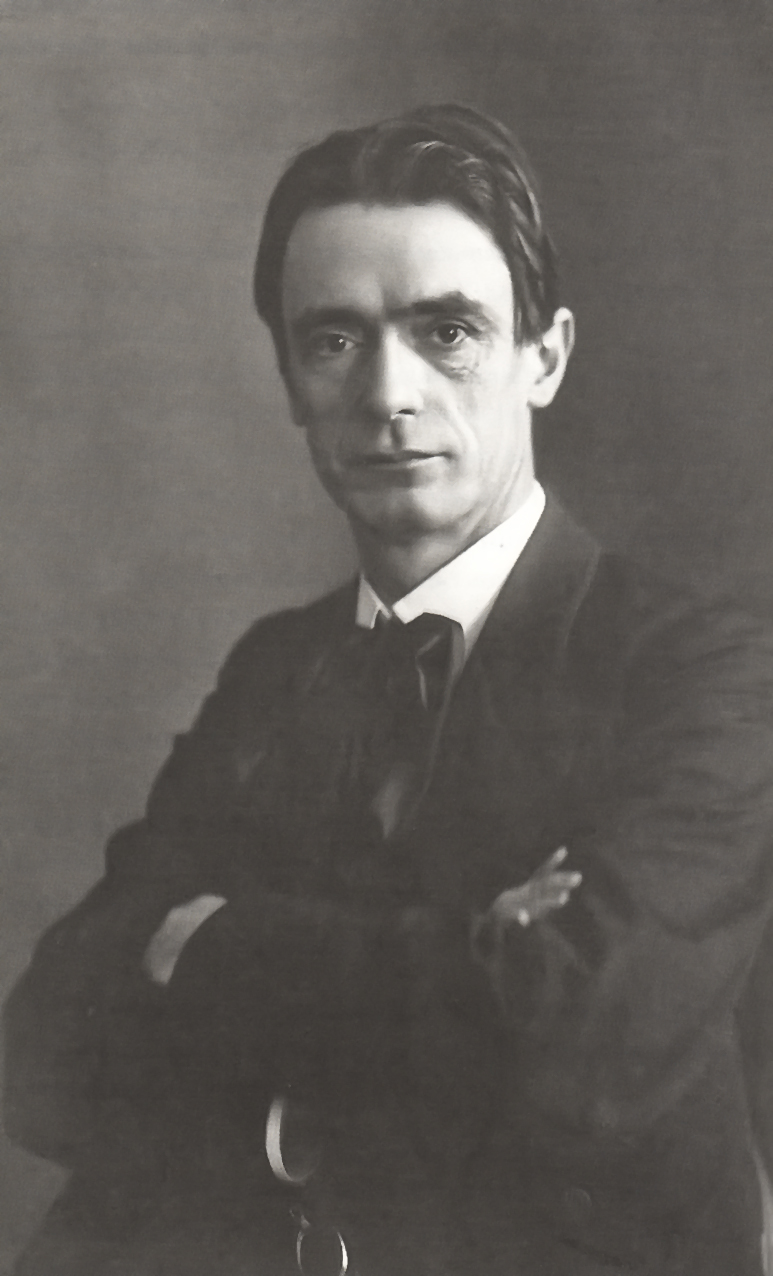
Rudolf Steiner, philosopher (PhD in 1891)

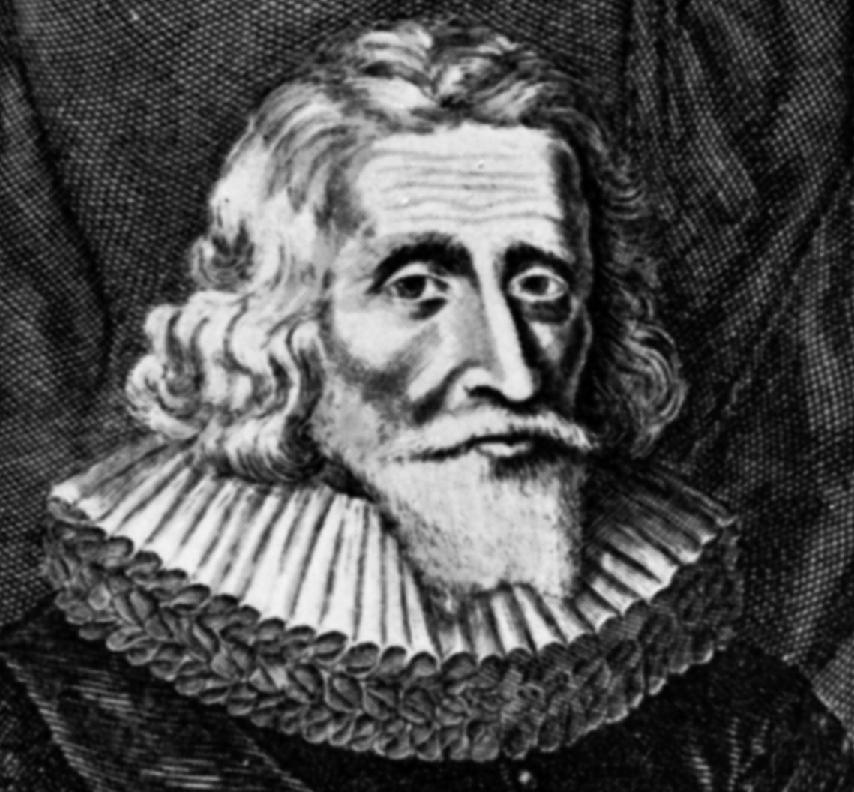
Joachim Jungius, mathematician and philosopher (professor, 1624–1628)

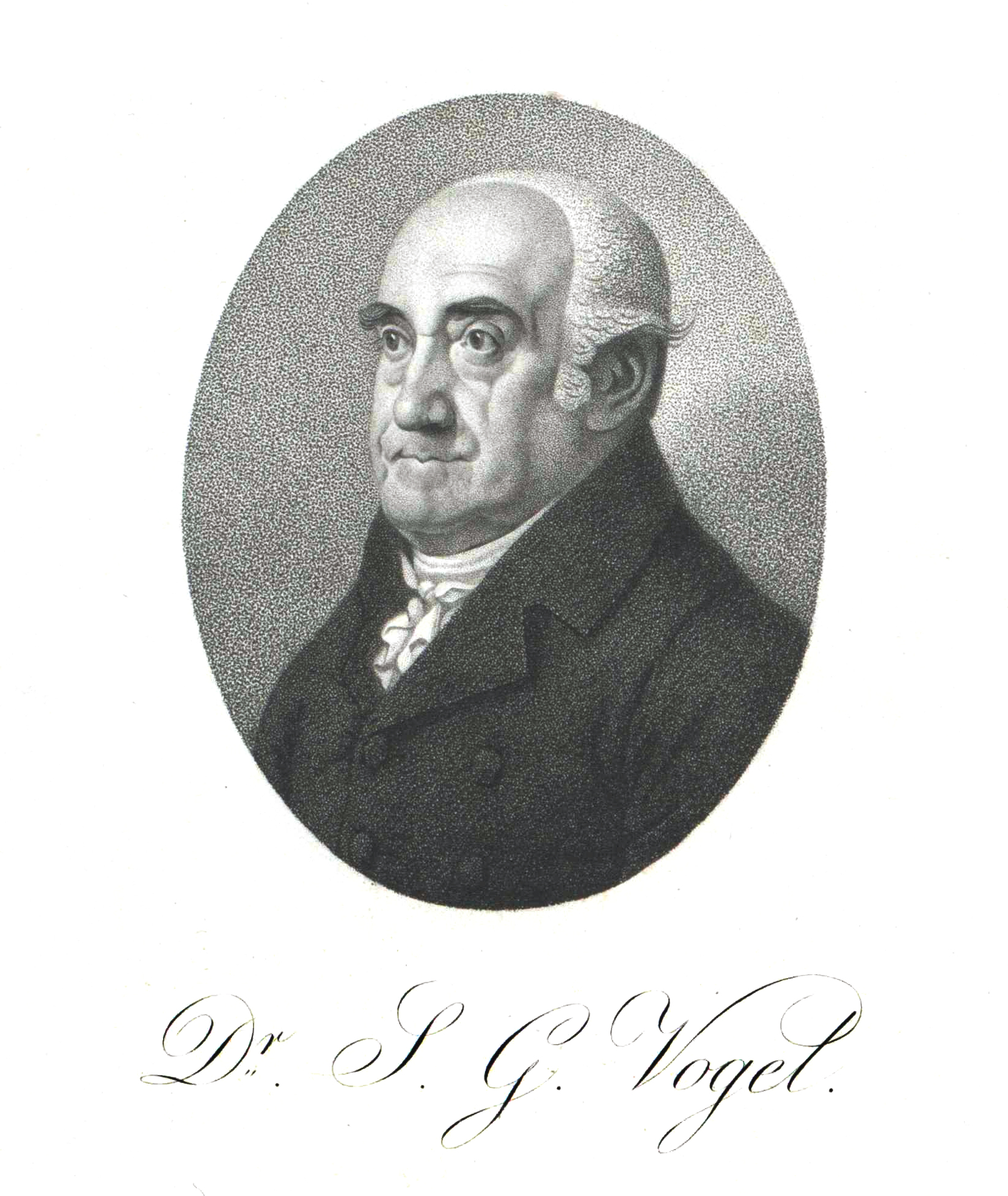
Samuel Gottlieb Vogel, physician, (medicine professor, 1789–1837)

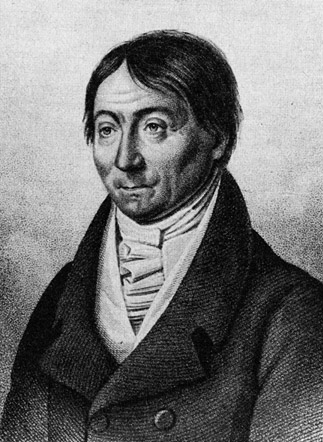
Johann Heinrich Friedrich Link, Natural scientist, (professor, 1792–1811)

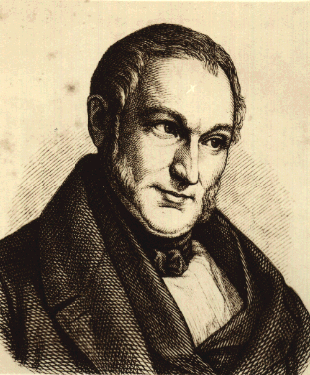
Johann Heinrich von Thünen, Economist (Dr. h.c. in 1830)

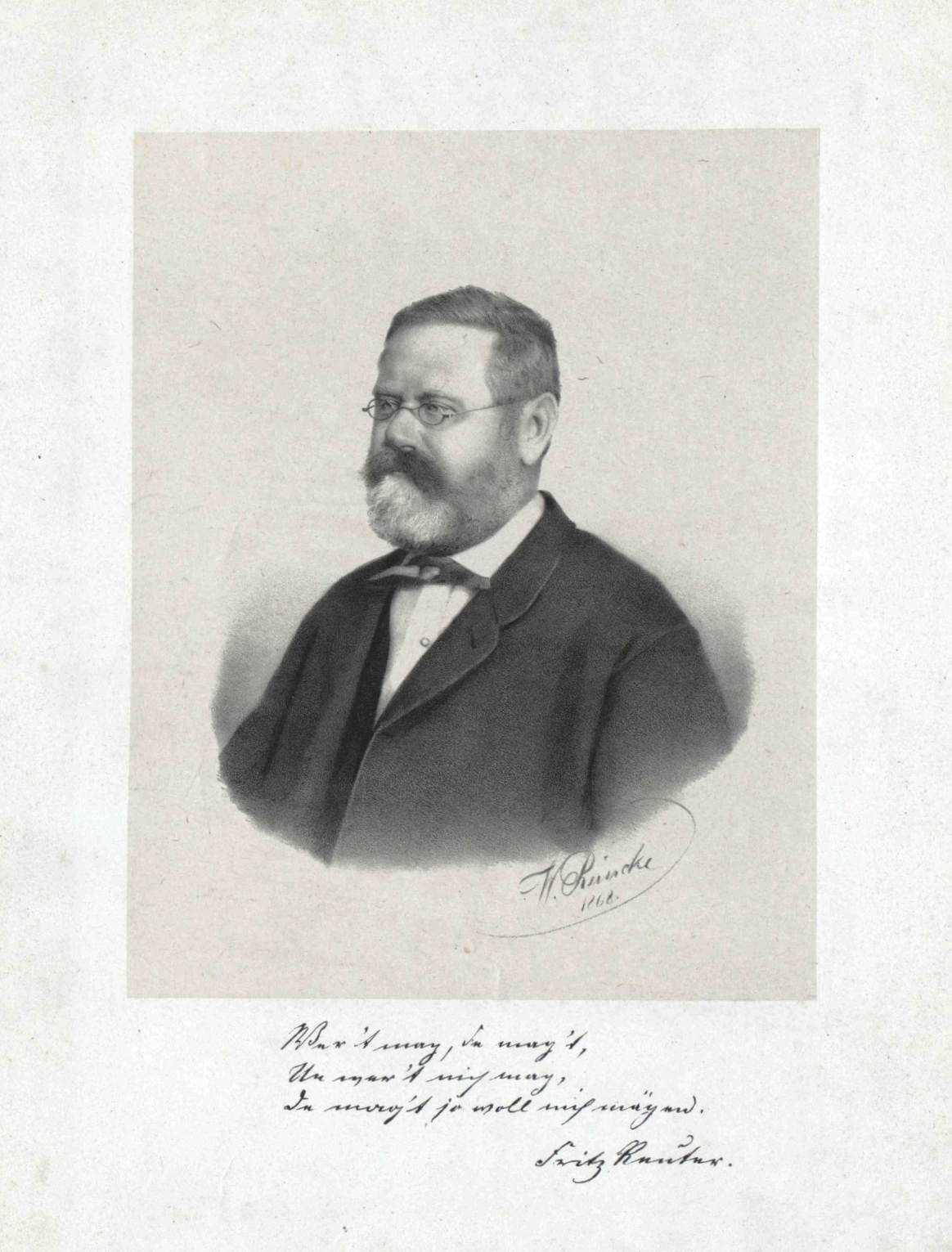
Fritz Reuter, novelist (studied law since 1831, Dr. h.c. in 1863)

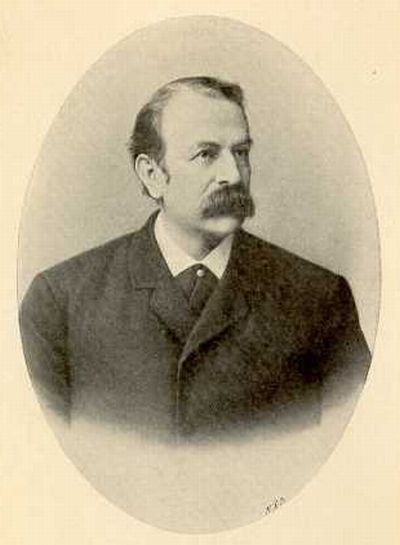
Rudolf Berlin, physician (ophthalmology professor, rector since 1897)

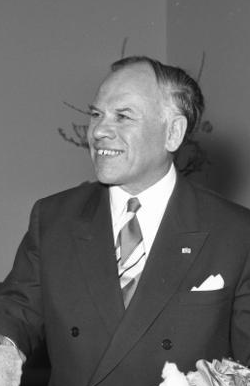
Eugen Gerstenmaier, president of the West German Bundestag (faculty of theology since 1935)

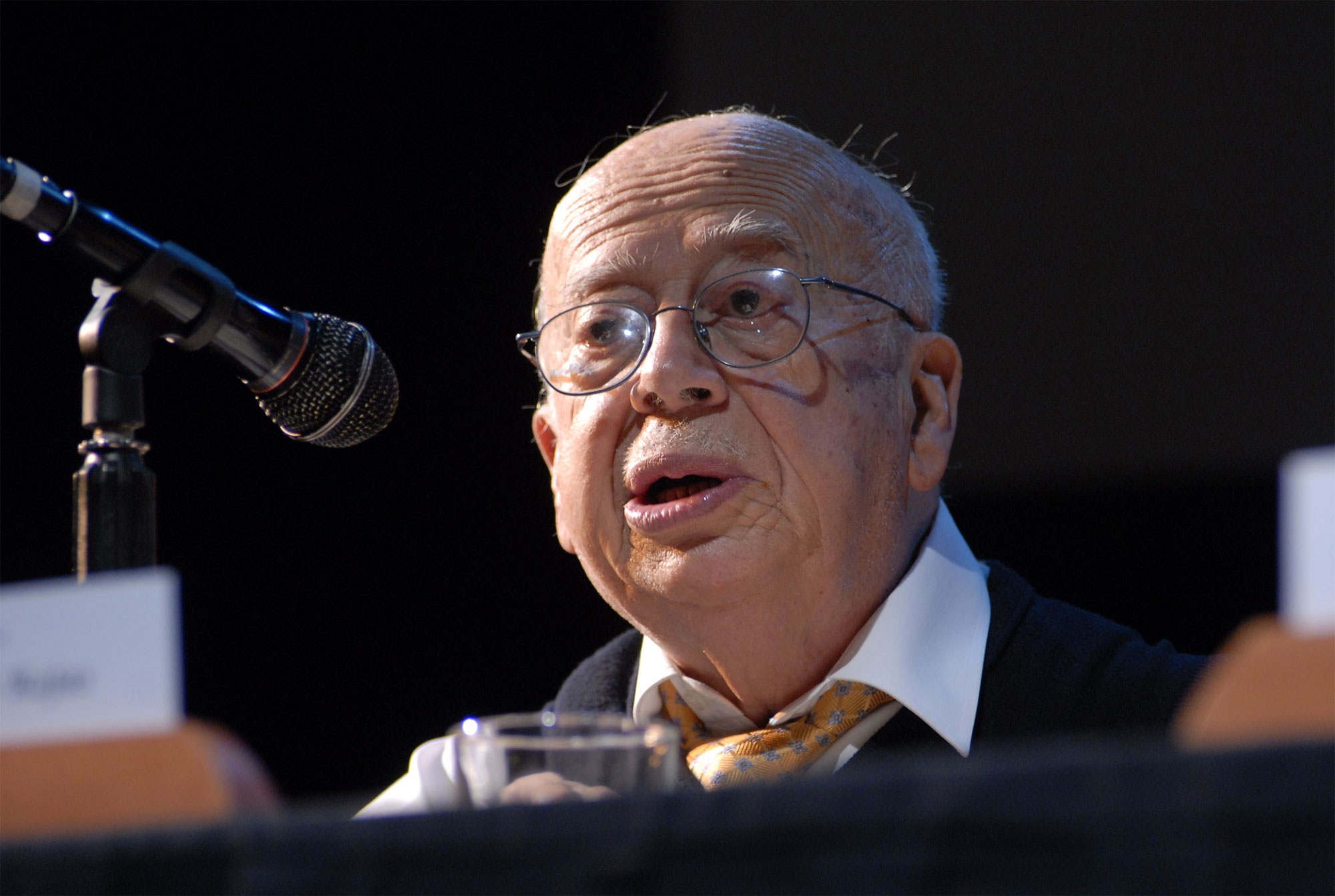
Gonzalo Rojas, poet (professor, 1973–1975)

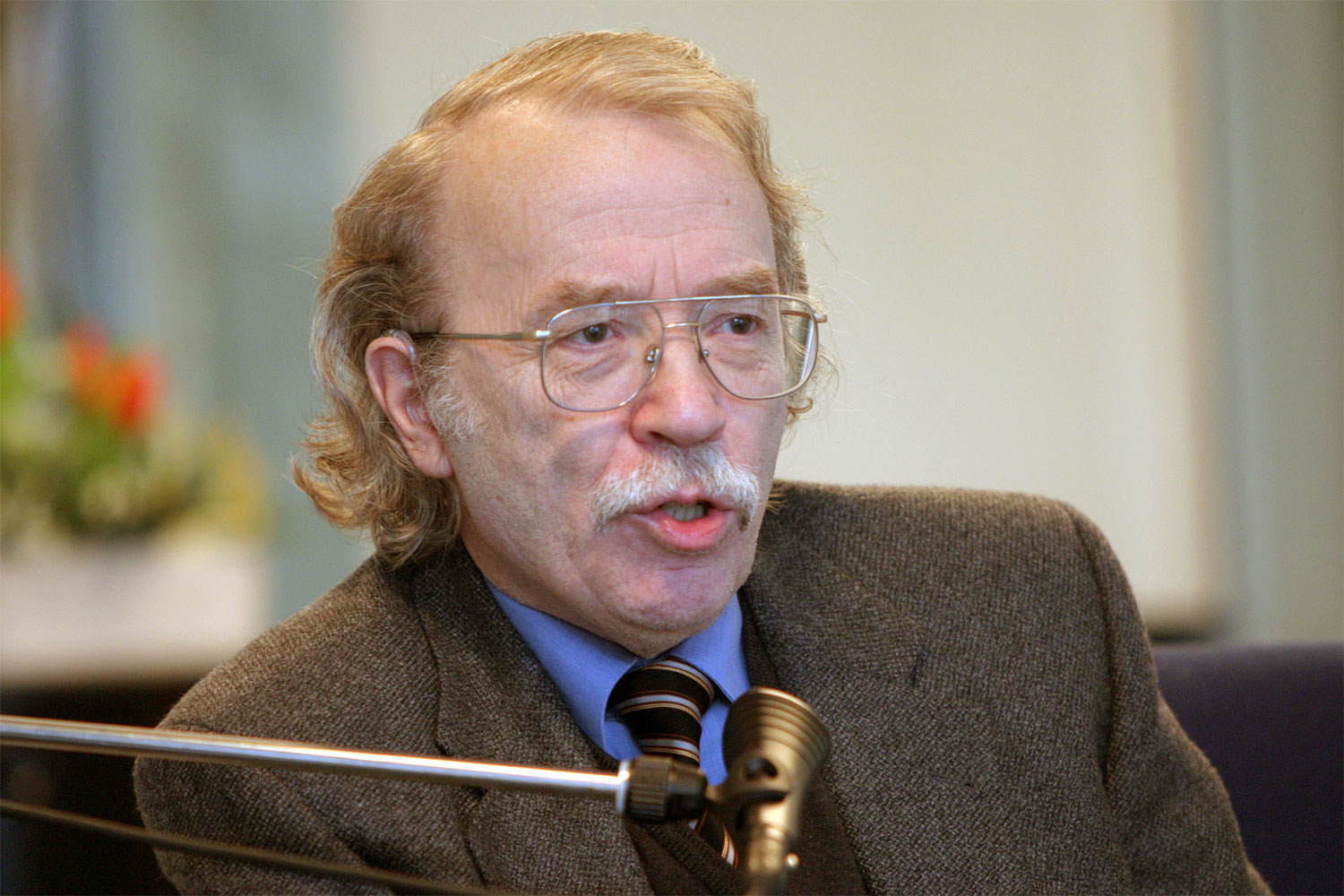
Walter Kempowski, writer (honorary professor, 2003–2007)

== See also ==
- Catalogus Professorum Rostochiensium
- List of medieval universities
- List of universities in Germany
- List of oldest universities in continuous operation
- Medieval university
