= Botanischer Garten Universität Rostock =

Botanical garden and arboretum in Mecklenburg-Vorpommern, Germany

Coordinates: 54°5′26.6″N 12°5′35.09″E

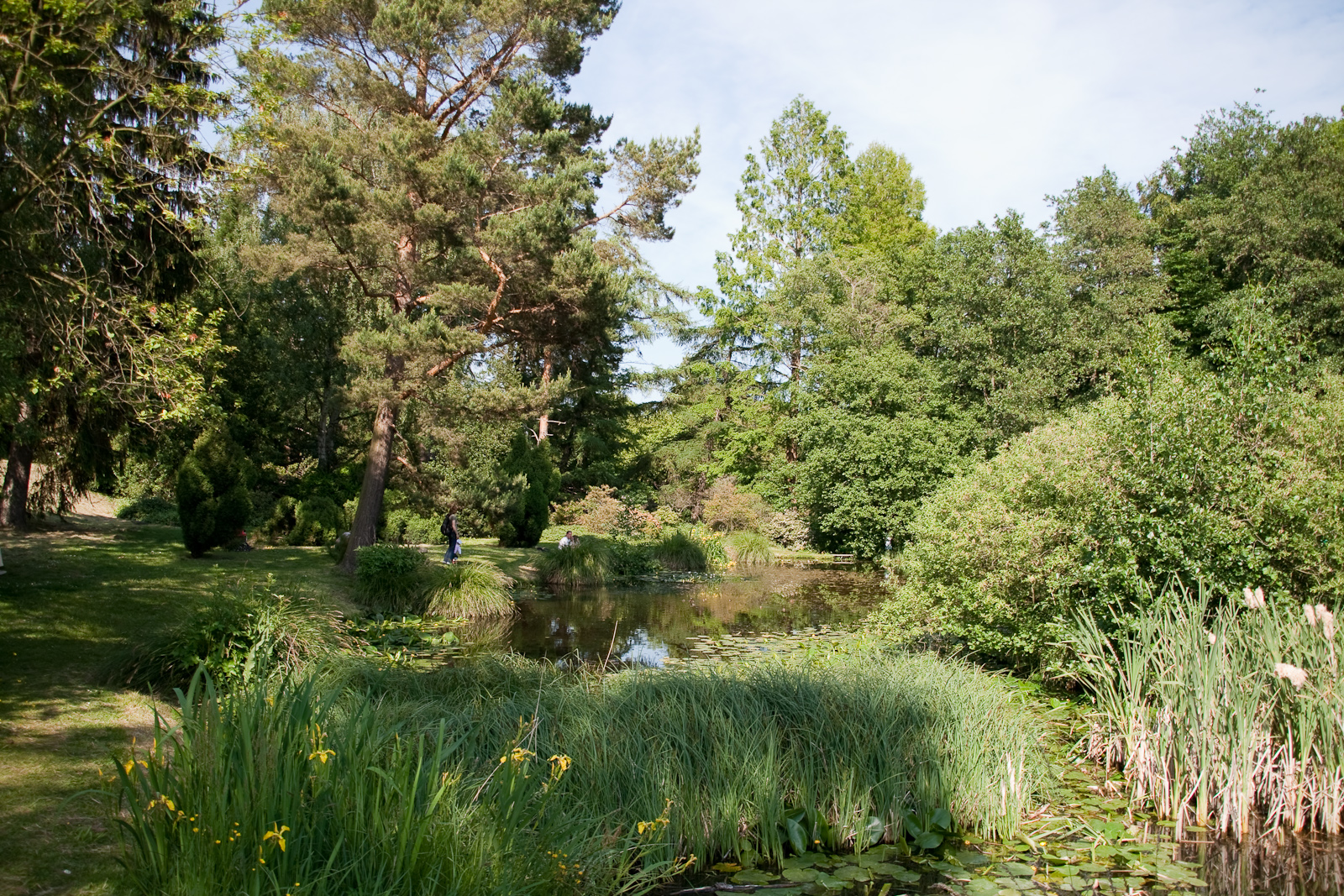
Botanischer Garten Universität Rostock

The Botanischer Garten Universität Rostock (7.8 hectares), also known as the Botanischer Garten Rostock, is a botanical garden and arboretum maintained by the University of Rostock. It is adjacent to the university sports fields along Hans-Sachs Allee, Rostock, Mecklenburg-Vorpommern, Germany, and open daily except Monday in the warmer months.

The university has maintained a botanical garden continuously since 1885. Its original location was on Doberaner Straße, but as expansion proved impossible, today's site was developed from 1935 to 1939. In 2009 a new tropical house was opened, named in honor of botanist Loki Schmidt.

Today the garden cultivates nearly 10,000 plants representing about 5,000 taxa. It is organized into the following major sections: alpine garden, arboretum, dune habitat, forest, healing and aromatic plants, pond, systematic garden (about 340 species in 48 beds, each 8 m^{2}), vegetable and ornamental plants. Its greenhouses contain aquatic plants, crops, ferns, orchids, and succulents.

The garden's herbarium contains nearly 80,000 specimens representing about 20,000 families. Its core holdings were accumulated by Prof. Johannes A.C. Roeper (1801-1885) between 1836-1882 and include collections from Heinrich Gustav Flörke (1764–1835), Adelbert von Chamisso (1781–1838), and Ferdinand von Mueller (1825-1896).

== See also ==
- List of botanical gardens in Germany
