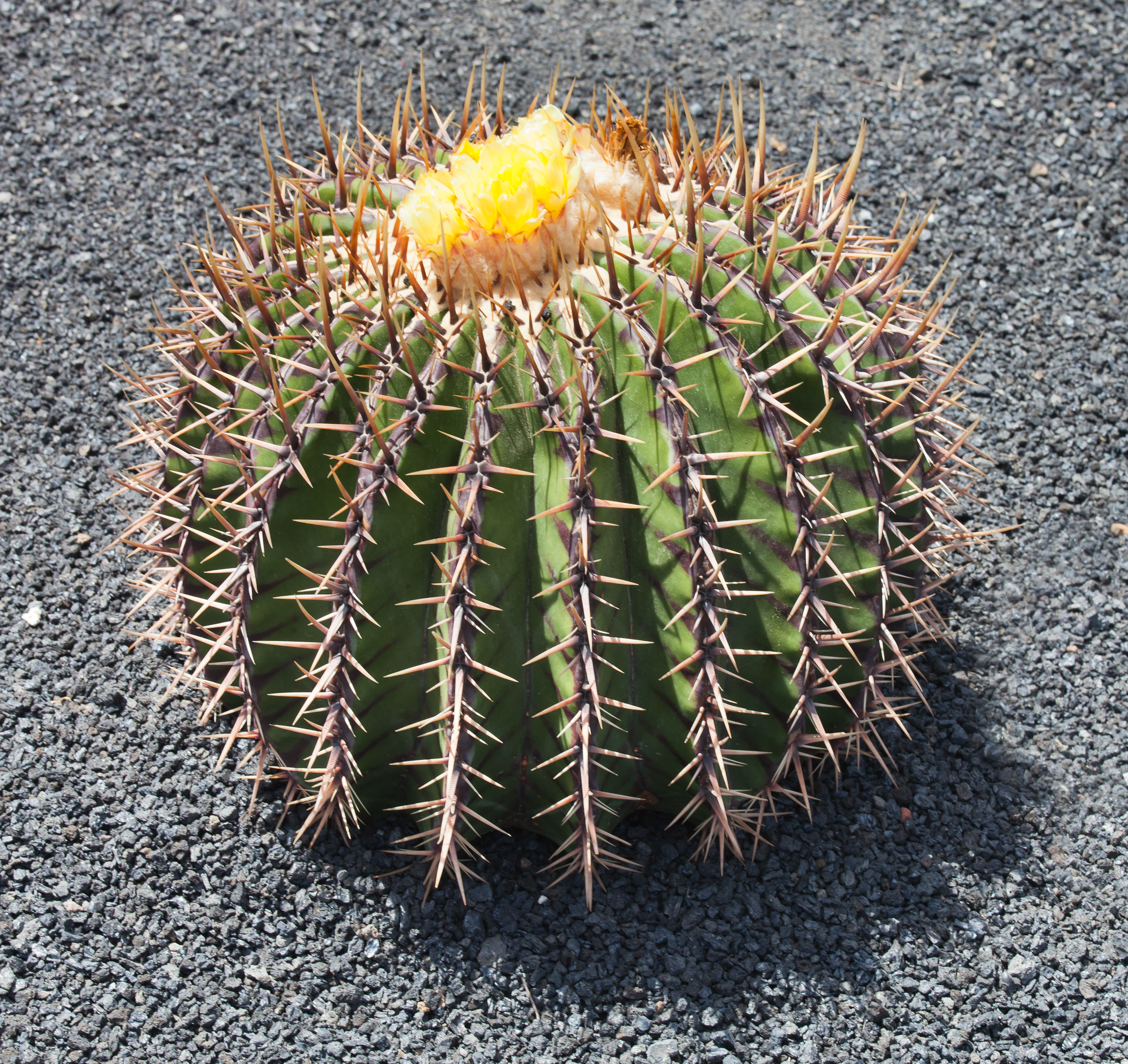
- Echinocactus platyacanthus in cultivation

Scientific classification
- Kingdom: Plantae
- Clade: Tracheophytes
- Clade: Angiosperms
- Clade: Eudicots
- Order: Caryophyllales
- Family: Cactaceae
- Subfamily: Cactoideae
- Tribe: Cacteae
- Genus: Echinocactus; Link & Otto

Type species
- Echinocactus platyacanthus

Species
- See text

Synonyms
- Brittonrosea Speg. Echinofossulocactus Lawr.

= Echinocactus =

Genus of cacti

Echinocactus is a genus of cacti in the subfamily Cactoideae. The generic name derives from the Ancient Greek ἐχῖνος (echînos), meaning "spiny," and cactus. It and Ferocactus are the two genera of barrel cactus. Members of the genus usually have heavy spination and relatively small flowers. The fruits are copiously woolly, and this is one major distinction between Echinocactus and Ferocactus. Propagation is by seed.

== Species ==
As of 2025, the genus includes 3 accepted species out of hundreds of plants having the name.

Image	Scientific name	Common name	Distribution
	Echinocactus × diabolicus (Halda, L.Vacek & Vaško) Janeba		Mexico (Zacatecas)
	Echinocactus horizonthalonius Lem.	Devil's Head, Silverbell Cactus, Turk's Head CactusGolden Barrel Cactus	southwestern United States and northern Mexico
	Echinocactus platyacanthus Link & Otto	Giant Barrel Cactus	Mexico in the Chihuahuan Desert

=== Formerly placed here ===
- Astrophytum asterias (Zucc.) Lem. (as E. asterias Zucc.)
- Aztekium ritteri (Boed.) Boed. (as E. ritteri Boed.)
- Kroenleinia grusonii (Hildm.) Lodé (as E. grusonii Hildm.)
- Ferocactus wislizeni (Engelm.) Britton & Rose (as E. wislizeni Engelm.)
- Lophophora williamsii (Lem. ex Salm-Dyck) J.M.Coult. (as E. williamsii Lem. ex Salm-Dyck)
- Turbinicarpus subterraneus (Backeb.) A.D.Zimm. (as E. subterraneus Backeb.)
- Homalocephala
  - Homalocephala parryi (Engelm.) Vargas & Bárcenas
  - Homalocephala polycephala (Engelm. & J.M.Bigelow) Vargas & Bárcenas
  - Homalocephala texensis (Hopffer) Britton & Rose
