= Devil's pincushion =

Devil's pincushion is a common name for several cacti and may refer to:

- Homalocephala parryi, native to Chihuahua
- Homalocephala texensis, native to New Mexico, Oklahoma, and Texas
