= Postage stamps and postal history of the Turks and Caicos Islands =

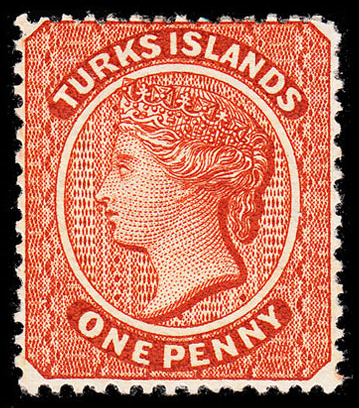
The first stamp issued by the Turks Islands in 1867

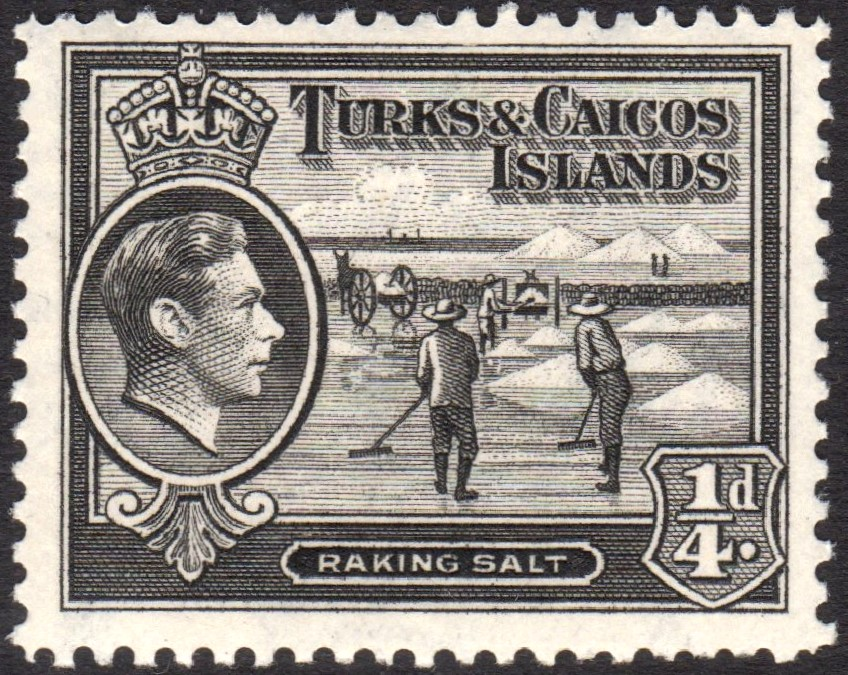
Raking salt on a 1938 stamp. The sea salt industry was important to the islands and featured on several stamps.

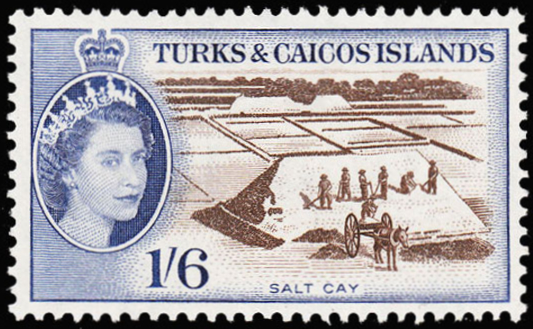
A 1957 mint stamp from the Turks and Caicos Islands

Postage stamps have been issued in the Turks and Caicos Islands since 1867. Initially these bore the wording "Turks Islands" but from 1900 have read "Turks and Caicos Islands". The territory's Philatelic Bureau has produced numerous series of stamps to appeal to stamp collectors including issues showing Disney characters and the Space Race.

== Turks Islands ==
The first stamp of the Turks Islands was issued on 4 April 1867 and was the one penny red, bearing the portrait of Queen Victoria. The stamp was reissued numerous times, surcharged to create new values between 1/2 penny and 4 pence. Stamps up to one shilling in value were later printed. The islands joined the Universal Postal Union on 1 January 1881 and new stamps were introduced to mark the reduced postage rates that resulted.

== Turks and Caicos Islands ==
The first stamp of the Turks and Caicos Islands were issued on 10 November 1900. They were issued in nine values ranging from a halfpenny to three shillings. Lower denominations bore the image of a ship. The 1910-11 issue featured the Turk's head cactus, after which the islands were named.

A new series of stamps was issued circa 1912 bearing the portrait of George V.

== Crown colony ==
The islands became a Crown Colony in 1962 and the first stamps issued under the new status were the Freedom from Hunger omnibus issue of 4 June 1963. In 1980 a series featuring molluscs was issued. The territory's Philatelic Bureau produced numerous series of stamps to appeal to stamp collectors. Themes have included the island's salt trade and wildlife and a series showing Disney characters (issued 1979 to 1985). In 1998 the islands issued a series to mark the 80th anniversary of the Royal Air Force and the American involvement in the Space Race to mark that year's return of John Glenn to space. A series was also issued for the Millennium celebrations.

== Caicos Islands ==
From 1981 to 1985 overprinted stamps marked Caicos Islands were issued but they are of doubtful validity.

== See also ==
- Revenue stamps of the Turks and Caicos Islands
