= Acitrón =

Mexican candy made from the endangered biznaga cactus

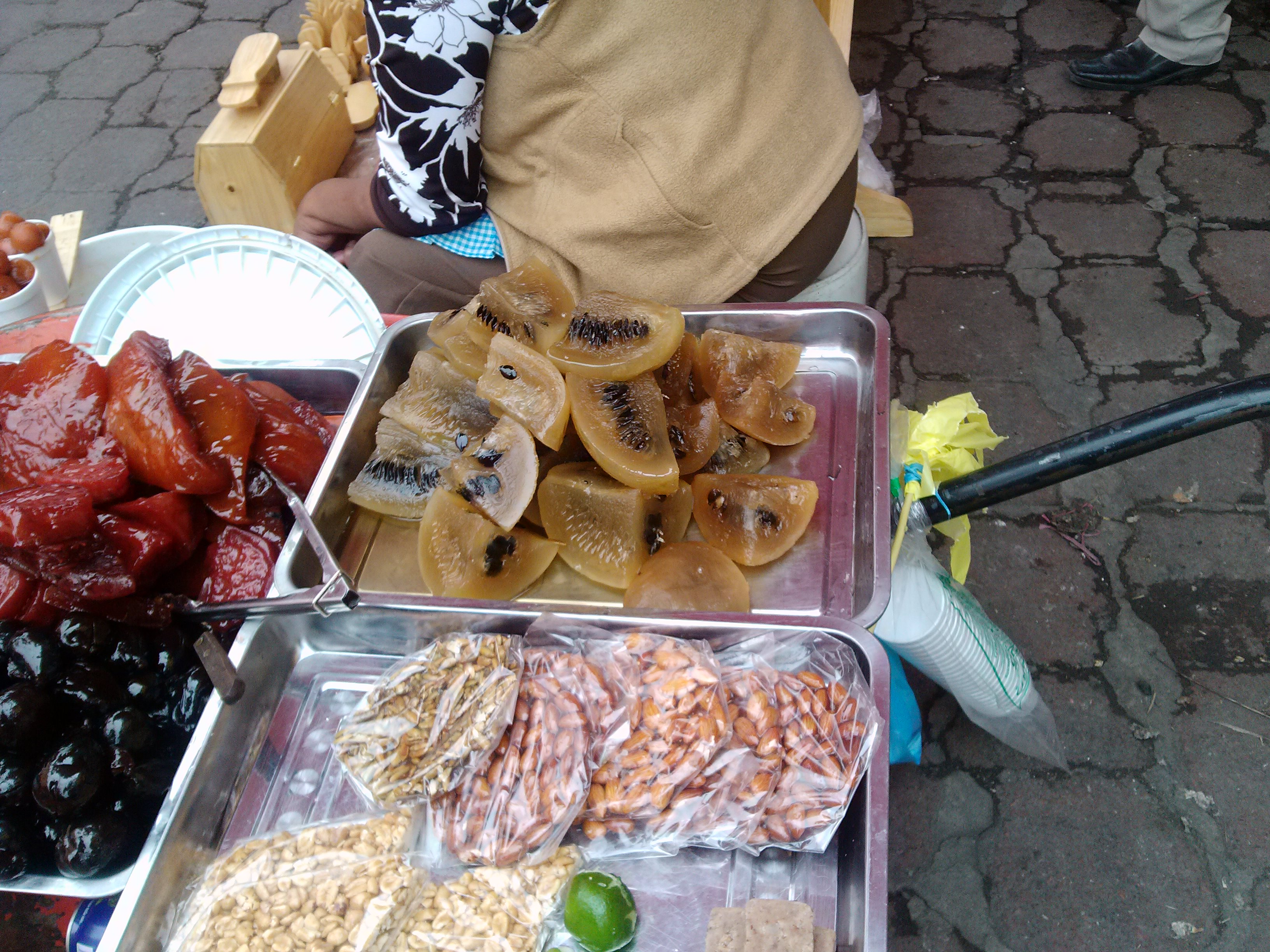
Crystallized sweets in a Mexican market.

The acitrón is a Mexican candy which is commonly used as a decoration on a three kings' cake. As an ingredient, it has great cultural significance since it is used in a large number of ritual and festive preparations. The biznaga cactus, from which acitróns are made, is an endangered species due to excessive consumption.

In Pre-Columbian Mexico, ancient peoples used the acitrón as a food source as well as for ritual purposes, according to artifacts found in caves near Tehuacán. Currently, the extraction and consumption of biznaga cactus pith to produce acitróns is a federal crime in Mexico.

== Description ==
The biznaga cactus is actually several cacti in various genera of the family Cactaceae (specifically Ferocactus, Melocactus, and Echinocactus) found in the Americas, in a range stretching from Canada to Chile. They exist in several different shapes; those used to produce acitróns are generally globular or cylindrical. Acitróns are obtained by extracting the pith from the cactus and then putting it through a crystallizing process, which produces a sweet yellow or translucent cream, with a smooth texture on the inside and a firm layer on the outside. Once the process is complete, the acitrón has a sugar content of 70 to 75%.

The preparation of acitróns is traditional in Mexico, and they are typically used to produce other traditional dishes such as three kings' cake, chiles en nogada, or tamales.

== Production ==
The production of an acitrón candy is difficult, since it is illegal to remove a biznaga cactus from its habitat. To produce one, the biznaga is cleaned by removing the spines and the outer layer of skin. Once it is cleaned, it is cut into small pieces and crystallized, substituting the water contained in the biznaga for sugar, by submerging it in syrup for long periods of time. Finally, it is dried so that the surface layer hardens. This process takes up to 48 hours, and the result is a solid, sweet, candy.

== Biznaga cactus ==
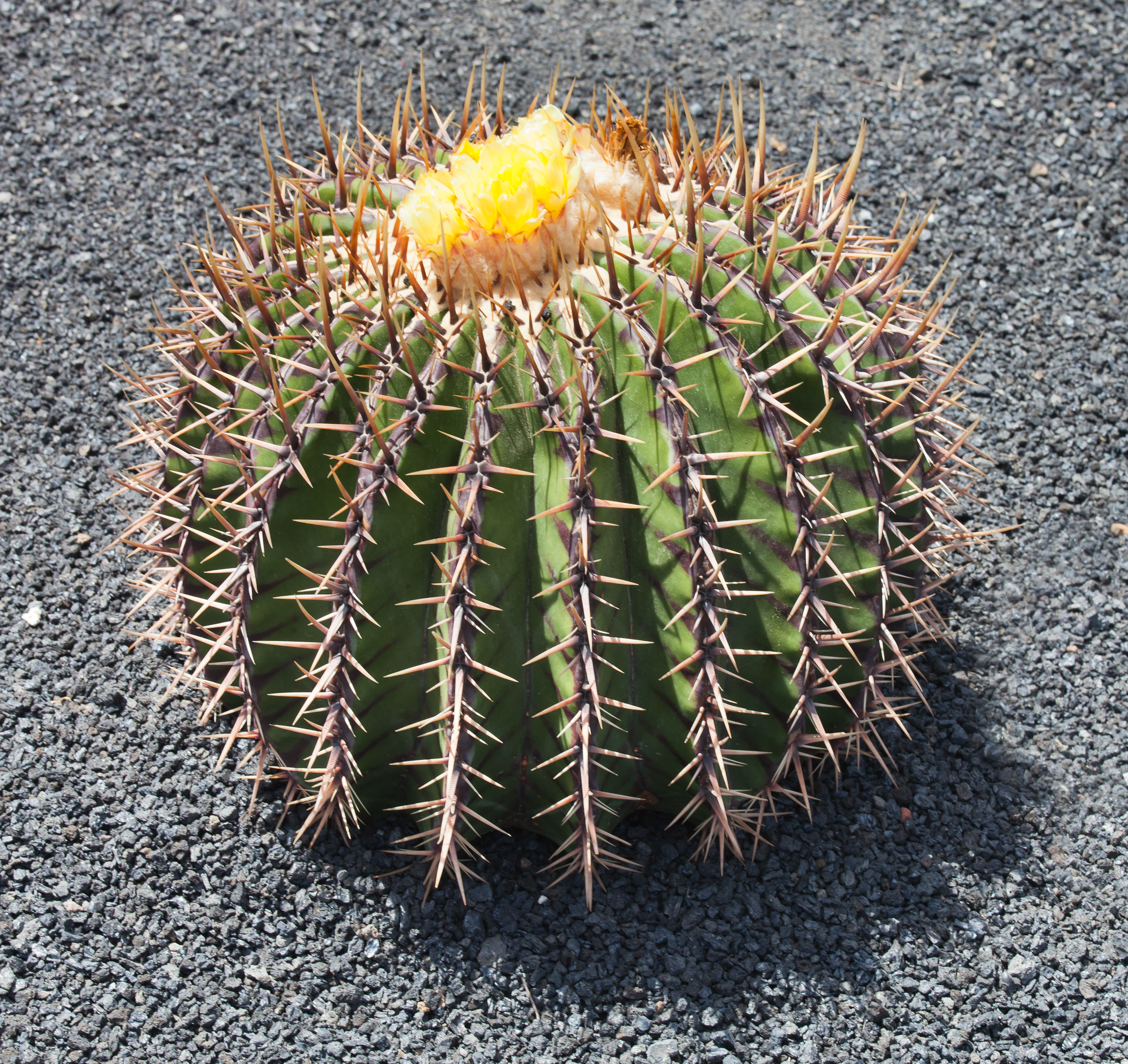
Echinocactus platyacanthus, one of the biznaga cactus species from which pith is extracted to create acitrón candies.

Biznaga is the common name for cacti of the genus Ferocactus or Echinocactus, which had great importance to the Aztecs, since they used them for medicinal, religious, and nutritional purposes. They are characterized by having cylindrical or spherical shapes. In Pre-Columbian Mexico, the flower and pith of the cactus were used in various dishes alongside chilies and spices for sauces, beans, and corn. It was not until the colonial era that Spanish cooking techniques were imported to Mesoamerica, allowing for the acitrón to become a commonly produced and appreciated candy.

Echinocactus platyacanthus (also known as the candy barrel cactus) is one of the most popular cacti used to produce acitrón candies, due to their high concentration of saccharides and range stretching across Mexico.

=== Ecosystem ===
The biznaga family of cacti is endemic to the Americas, with its range extending from Canada to Argentina. The cacti primarily grow in hot, dry climates, such as broadleaf forests, grasslands, steppes, and deserts with an average temperature between 25 °C and 45 °C, and minimal precipitation for most of the year. They grow in rocky and clay-like soils, with thick but not very deep roots. This climate is common in the north of Mexico as well as in some small microclimates of states of the center of the country.

The biznaga family have evolved to have particular anatomical and physical properties which allow them to thrive in arid environments. Because they are succulents, the structure of their bodies allows them to accumulate a large amount of water in their tissues, and small, nearly nonexistent leaves reduce water loss via evapotranspiration. Photosynthesis occurs on the surface of their cylindrical bodies, and they flower only during periods of rain, generally with yellow inflorescences.

=== Conservation efforts ===
Biznaga cacti are characterized by slow growth, which reduces their availability for the production of acitrón candies. This, combined with a lack of cultivation, has caused the cacti to become scarce and consequently protected by Mexican federal law, with prohibitions on cutting, processing and sale of biznaga cacti. Due to uncontrolled extraction of biznaga pith, Mexican state governments have created ecological reserves, such as the Metztitlán Canyon Biosphere Reserve and the Tehuacán-Cuicatlán Biosphere Reserve, whose purpose is the conservation of both animal and plant species in their own habitats.

=== Present day ===
In the Norma Oficial Mexicana (NOM-059-ECOL-2001), the biznaga cactus is listed as a protected species, despite its wide distribution in the central and northern regions of Mexico, because its populations are low and declining due to human impact.

Despite legal protections, the acitrón is commonly available in Mexican markets, particularly in states such as San Luis Potosí, Querétaro, Hidalgo, Puebla and Oaxaca, as well as in Mexico City. To avoid legal problems related to the extraction of the biznaga, only the cactus pith is transported in trucks to Mexico City. Once the shipments arrive, the candies are prepared by a small group of producers within the city, then exported to the other states. Thus, although the extraction of the biznaga is illegal, the traditional acitrón is still consumed in Mexico.

== Culinary and cultural importance ==
The acitrón forms part of many traditional Mexican dishes. It is used in a Mexican variant of the thee king's cake, which is associated with and eaten on Epiphany, as well as in chiles en nogada, a dish usually associated with Mexican independence festivities. Other dishes created using acitróns remain popular in Mexico, and are often eaten in the Christmas season and during the feast days of Christian saints. These cultural and culinary traditions are a major difficulty in the protection of the biznaga cactus, since they cannot be made without the cactus pith.

=== Possible substitutes for biznaga acitróns ===
As a result of the prohibition of biznaga harvesting, large industries have sought substitutes for the ingredient instead. Examples of such substitutes include the quince cheese (a jelly made of the pulp of the quince fruit), industrially produced jellies, or crystallized green papaya or jícama, among others.

== In the United States ==
Charles Donofrio opened a confectionery store in Arizona in 1887. It expanded in 1891 due to good candy and ice cream sales. During the year, his brother, Dominick Donofrio, boarded a train and saw a desert full of cacti. He realized there was a business opportunity in candy made of biznaga cactus when he went back to work at the store. In 1905, he bought the store from Charles and then created a product named Crystalized Cactus Candy, a cube-shaped candy with a gelatinous core and sugary crust. He spread ads targeting Christmas shoppers and husbands, which worked; the shop's mail orders increased drastically.

In 1921, George Carameros opened a similar store in El Paso, also selling cactus candy, after getting the recipe from a merchant for five dollars at the time. A 300-pound (140 kg) visnaga in the downtown was exhibited to promote his shop. He expanded the cactus candy lineup to include cactus preserves and ice cream, and made several variations, including fruit flavored and chocolate-coated candy. It was also a success, being offered in intercontinental trains and international ships. Other small cactus candy shops were established across California, Arizona, New Mexico, and Texas, attempting to emulate the success of the venture. However, new companies often failed due to few repeat customers.

In the late 1920s, biznaga cactus started to run out due to cactus candy's continued popularity, truck access into the desert easing cactus harvesting, and emerging new uses. Anti-harvesting legislation was passed in 1928 in San Bernardino County and Riverside County. But, despite similar legislation passing in Arizona, until the 1940s, Dominick continued to harvest biznaga by hiring a Native American harvester from his reservation, where it was still allowed. He also harvested in the Organ Mountains until the 1950s, when his candy venture was sold.

Cactus candy is still on sale in Arizona, where it is a local delicacy, but most of them are made from prickly pear cactus.

== Bibliography ==
- Hefter, H (1995). Tecnología de los alimentos: Procesos físicos y químicos de la preparación de alimentos. México: Limusa.
- Eduards, W (2000). Las ciencias de las Golosinas. España: Acribia.
- Badui, S (2006). Química en los alimentos. Pesaron Educación.
- Norman, P (1992). La ciencia de los alimentos. México: Harla.
- Desrosier, N (1994). Conservación de alimentos. México: Continental.
