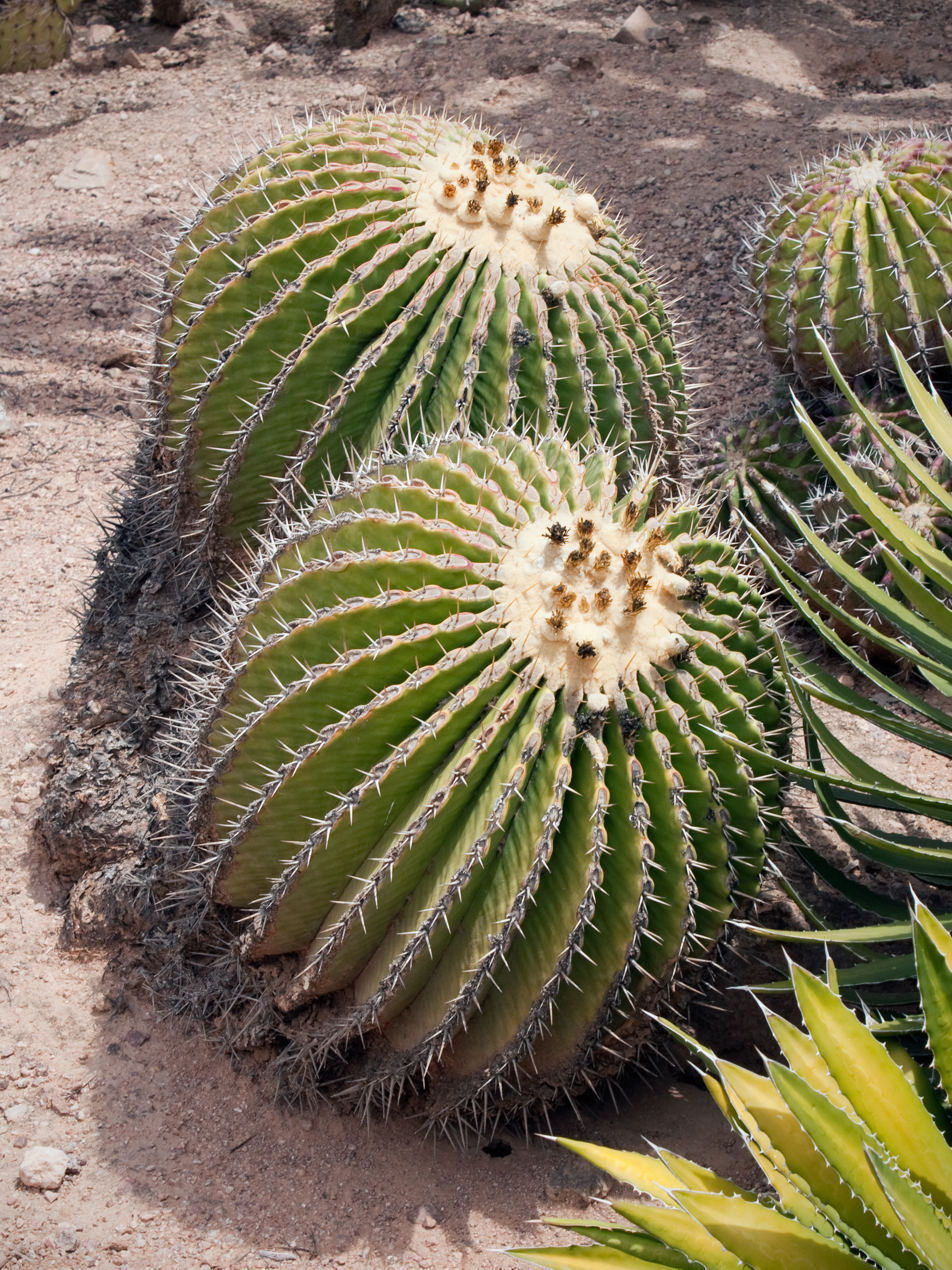

Conservation status
- Near Threatened (IUCN 3.1)

Scientific classification
- Kingdom: Plantae
- Clade: Tracheophytes
- Clade: Angiosperms
- Clade: Eudicots
- Order: Caryophyllales
- Family: Cactaceae
- Subfamily: Cactoideae
- Genus: Echinocactus
- Species: E. platyacanthus

Binomial name
- Echinocactus platyacanthus Link & Otto

= Echinocactus platyacanthus =

Species of cactus

Echinocactus platyacanthus is a member of the cactus family Cactaceae. It is also known as the giant barrel cactus, golden barrel cactus, giant viznaga, or biznaga de dulce, and its Nahuatl (Aztec) name is huitzli nahual.. It is native to central Mexico in the Chihuahuan Desert. This species is the largest of the barrel cacti. In Mexico, its hairs are often used for weaving; and acitrón, a traditional Mexican candy, is produced by boiling the cactus pith.

== Description ==
This slow-growing species can reach sizes up to 2.5 m (8.2 ft) tall and 1.5 m (4.9 ft) wide and can live over a hundred years. Previous records show that some specimens grow to almost 1.2 m (3 ft 11 in) in thickness. What is probably the largest barrel cactus living today is the one called "Goliat" at the "Area natural de Daxpe", in the Municipio [county] de Cadereyta, Querétaro State, Mexico. It is 2.95 m (9 ft 8 in) in height, at least 0.9 m (2 ft 11 in) thick and weighs about 3 metric tons (6,600 lb). Another one at Ixmiquilpan, Mexico has a measured diameter of 120 cm (47 in) and is 2.4 m (7 ft 10 in) high. Britton and Rose reported a specimen (photographed, but not published) which was 1.33 m (4 ft 4 in) thick, by 3 m (9.8 ft) in height and weighed 2,000 kg (4,400 lb). Britton and Rose also state that the Prussian botanist Von Karwinski saw specimens up to 1.8 m (5 ft 11 in) diameter. The straight, rigid spines are black. The apex of the cactus is flat and covered with a yellow felt-like substance. They are heavily ribbed, with 25 to 30 vertical ribs (occasionally as many as 60), and have large areoles. Their diurnal, tubular flowers bloom at the end of spring to summer and are a vivid greenish-yellow color; they grow to about 2 cm (0.79 in) in height and 3 cm (1.2 in) in width. Occasionally they are as much as 8 cm (3.1 in) in width. The fruit is about 3 cm (1.2 in) long and is covered by a hairy wool.

== Gallery ==
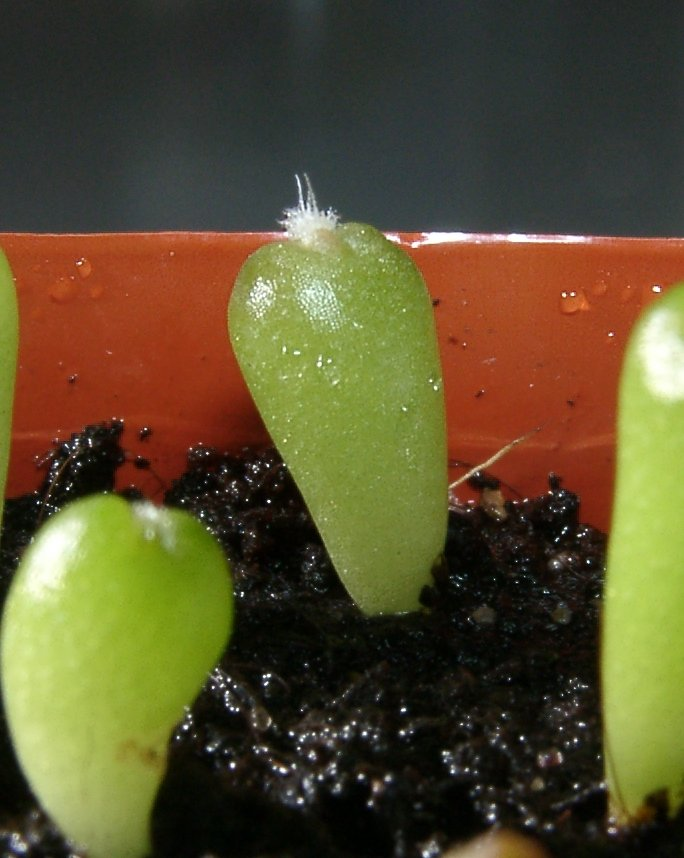
Echinocactus platyacanthus at 16 days

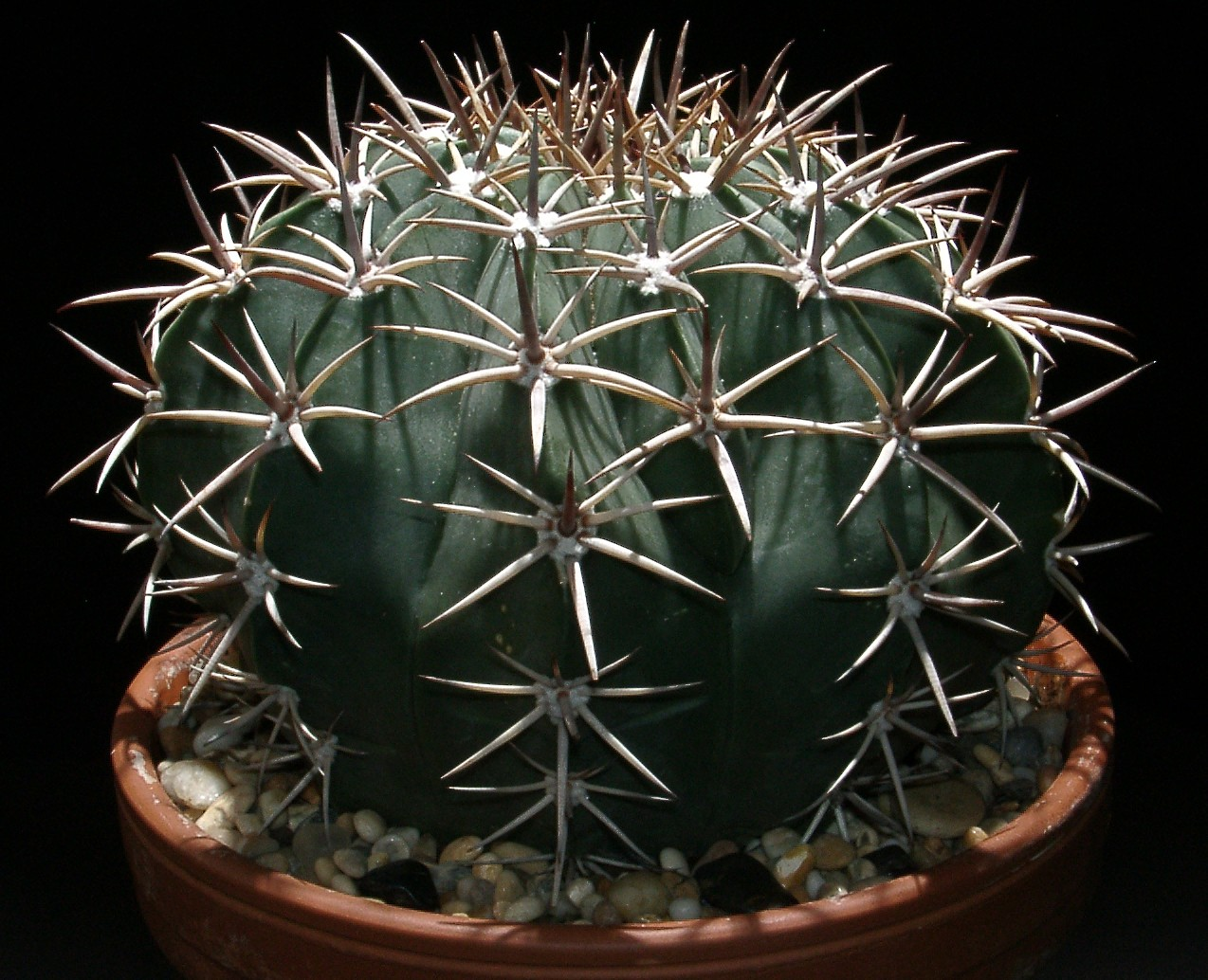
At 14 cm

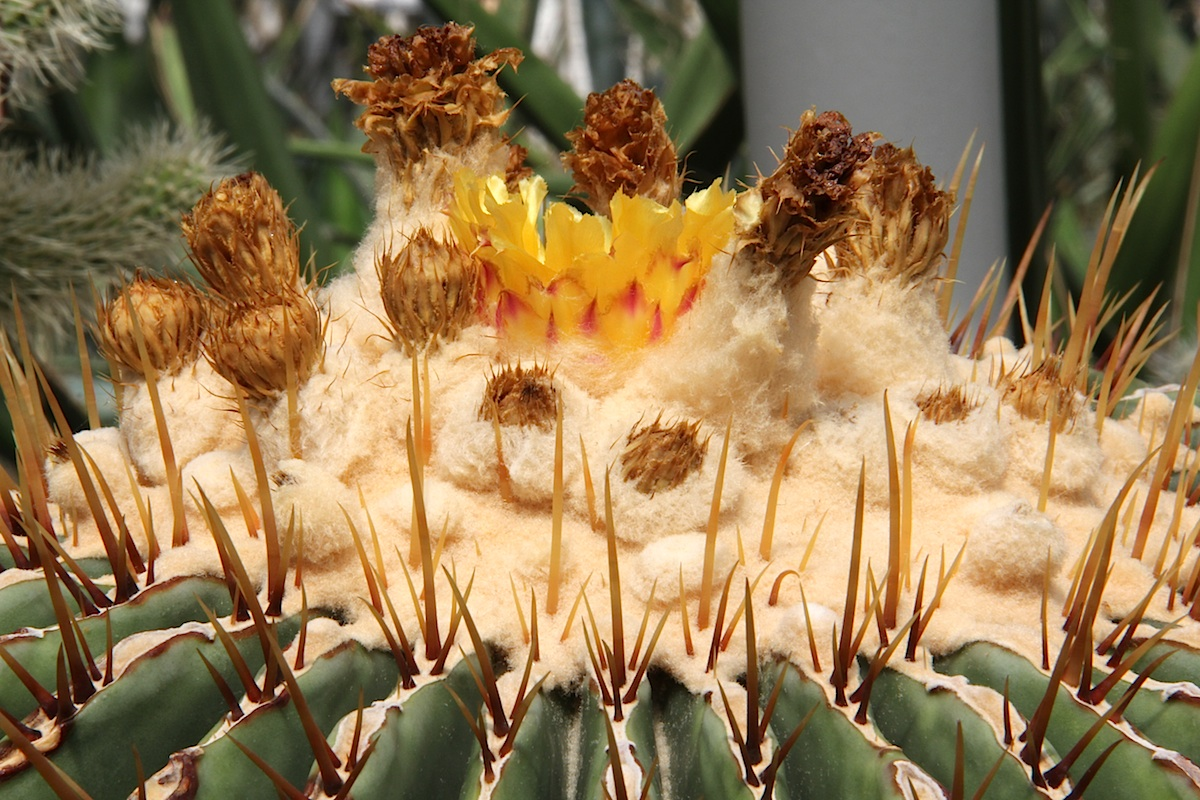
Inflorescence

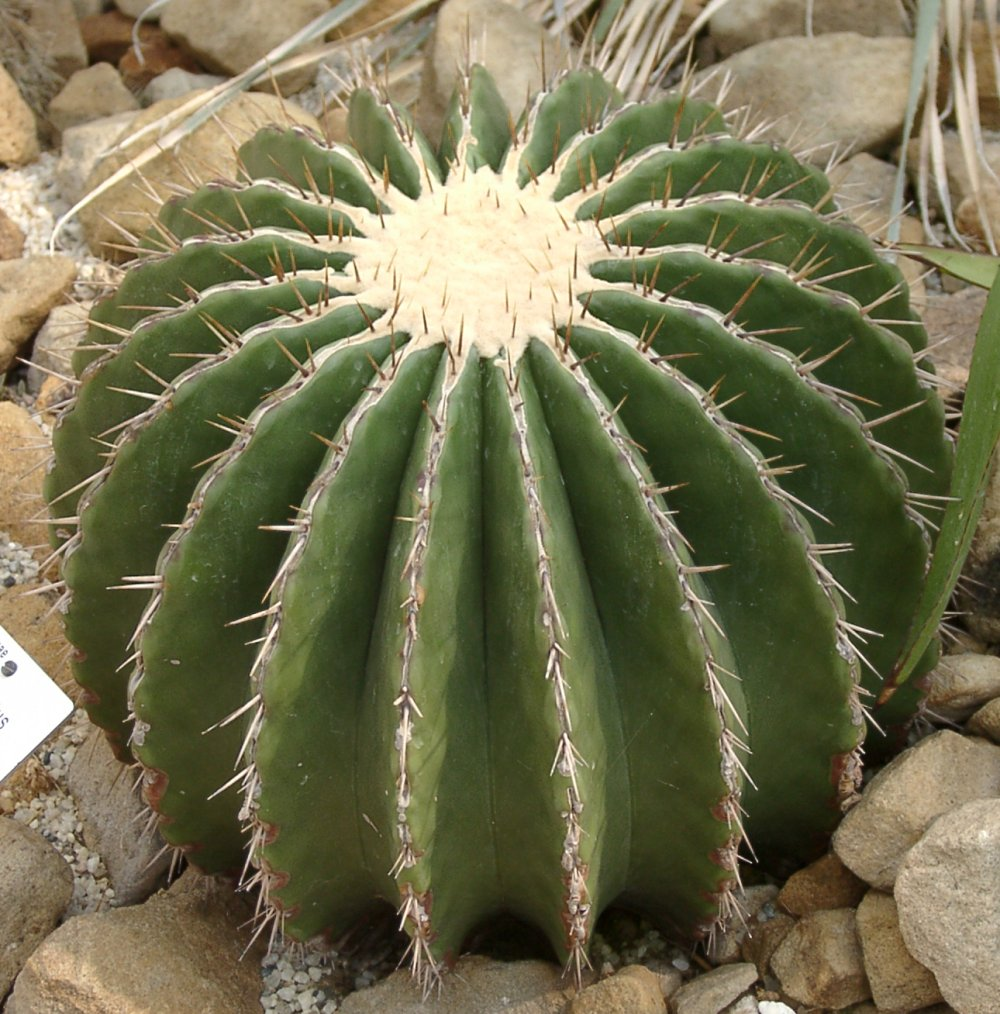

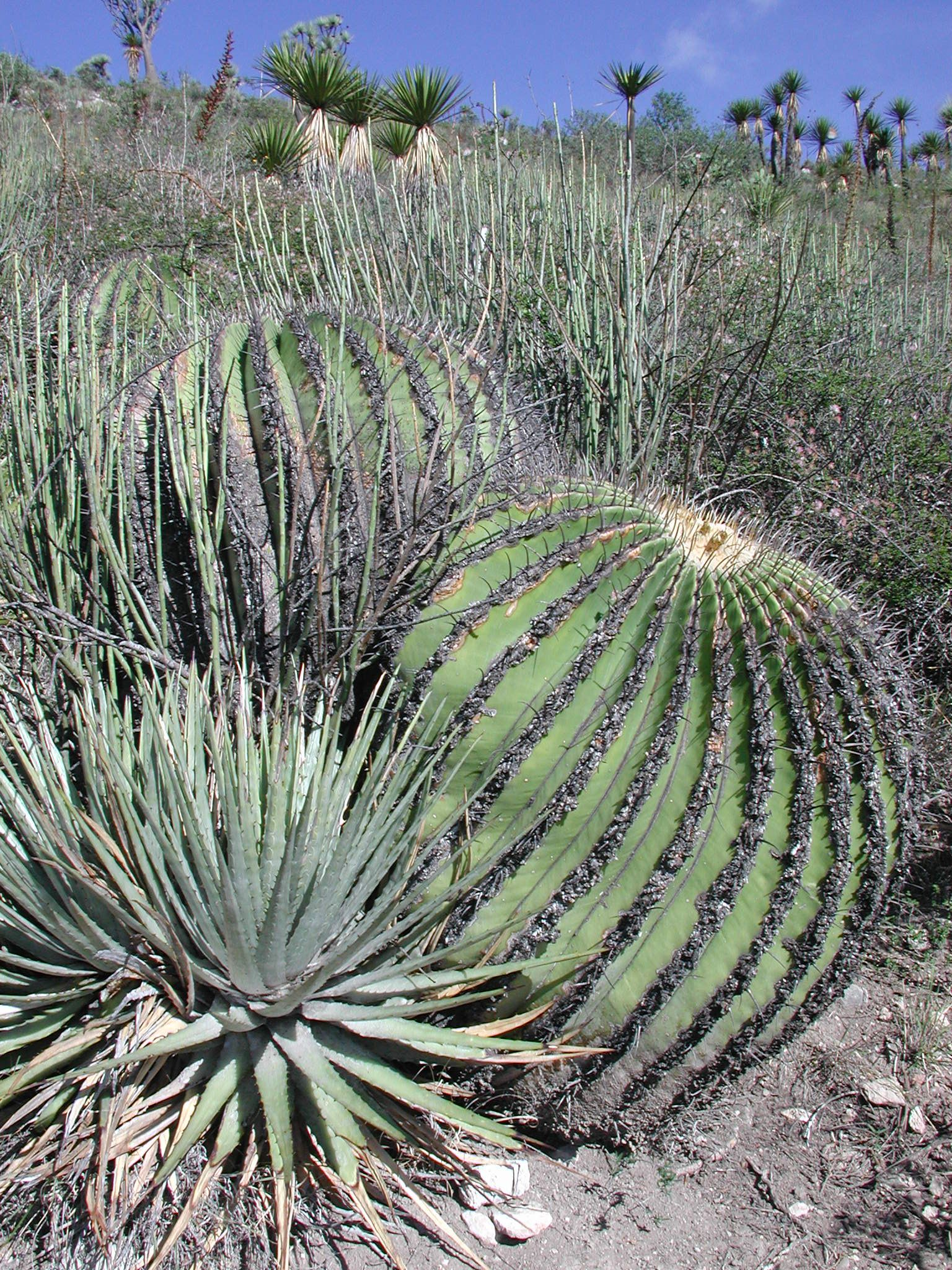
In natural habitat
