= Revenue stamps of the Turks and Caicos Islands =

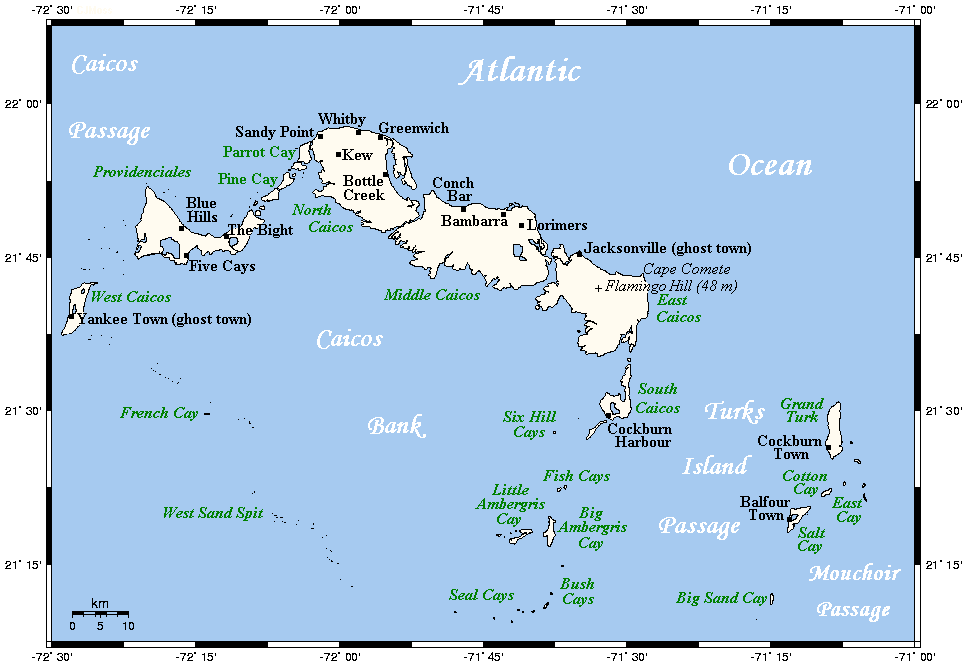
Map of the Turks and Caicos Islands

The Turks and Caicos Islands issued revenue stamps from 1988 to 1998. The Turks and Caicos Islands normally used postage stamps for fiscal purposes, however on 15 December 1988 they issued a $10 value intended for the payment of departure tax. This did not have any wording on it indicating fiscal use and thus was also accepted for postal purposes. Some years later, around 1992, the same design was reissued but inscribed "DEPARTURE TAX" above the country name. In 1998, a new stamp with the face value of $15 was issued commemorating the cable and wireless centenary.

== See also ==
- Postage stamps and postal history of the Turks and Caicos Islands
