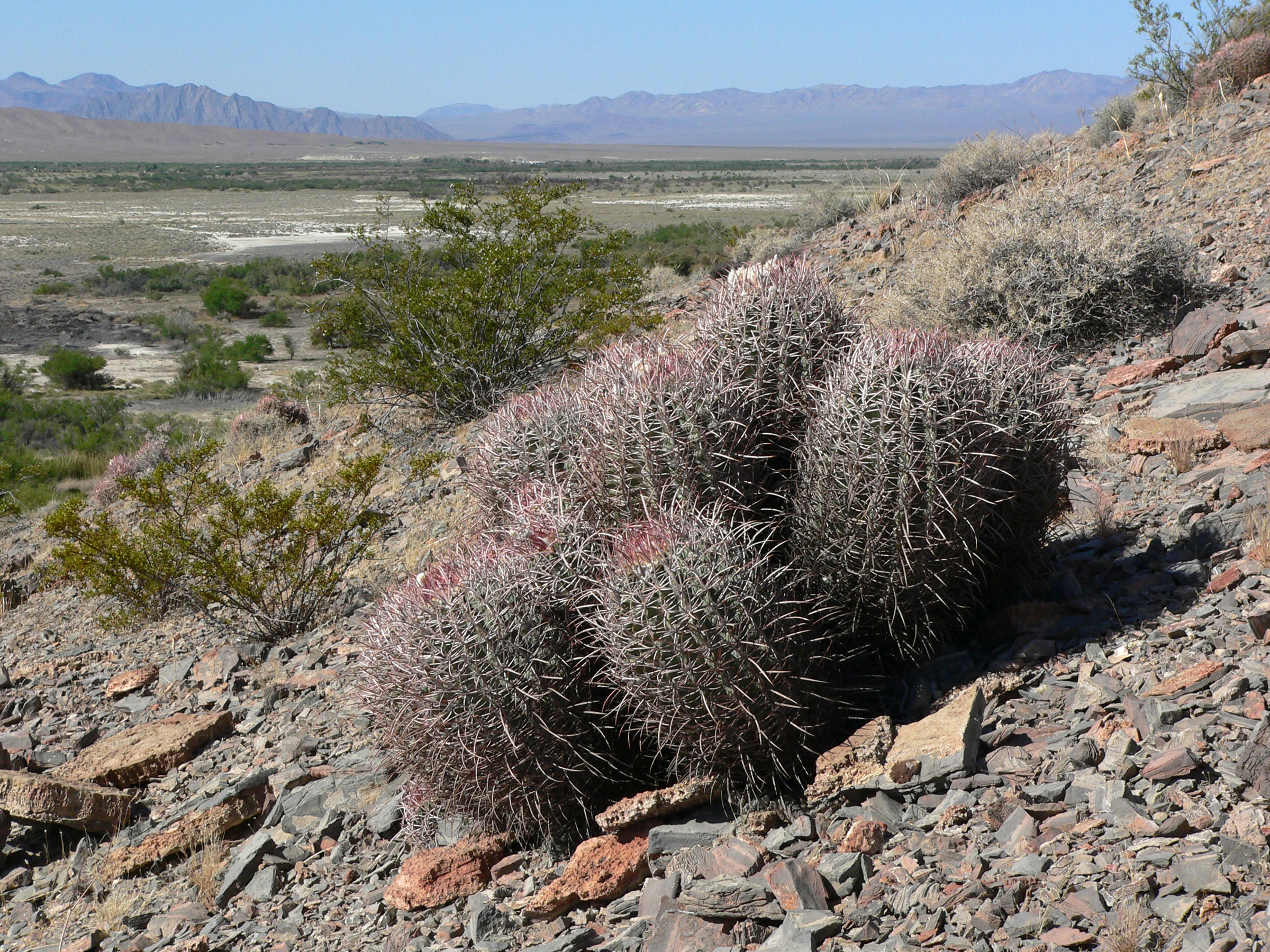
- Homalocephala polycephala

Scientific classification
- Kingdom: Plantae
- Clade: Embryophytes
- Clade: Tracheophytes
- Clade: Spermatophytes
- Clade: Angiosperms
- Clade: Eudicots
- Order: Caryophyllales
- Family: Cactaceae
- Subfamily: Cactoideae
- Tribe: Cacteae
- Genus: Homalocephala; Britton & Rose

Type species
- Homalocephala texensis

Species
- See text.

= Homalocephala (plant) =

Genus of cacti

Homalocephala is a genus of plants native to Mexico and the United States.

== Description ==
Plants in this genus differ from Echinocactus and Astrophytum by having stem that have few trichomes at the apex and acute ribs; flowers that are slightly tubular rather than campanulate; embryos that are campilotropous and acute cotyledons.

== Taxonomy ==
In the past, all three species have been considered to be in the genus Echinocactus. In 1922 by Nathaniel Lord Britton and Joseph Nelson Rose segregated E. texensis to its own genus Homalocephala based on differences in growth form and fruit morphology. Homalocephala was then moved to a subgenus of Echinocactus by Alwin Berger in 1929. The subgenus was elevated to a genus again in 2018 based on morphological and molecular evidence.

== Species ==
As of June 2025, Plants of the World Online accepts three species:

Image	Scientific name	Common name	Distribution
	Homalocephala parryi (Engelm.) Vargas & Bárcenas syn. Echinocactus parryi	Devil's cushion	Mexico
	Homalocephala polycephala (Engelm. & J.M.Bigelow) Vargas & Bárcenas syn. Echinocactus polycephalus	Cotton top cactus	S. California, S. Nevada, Arizona, Mexico
	Homalocephala texensis (Hopffer) Britton & Rose syn. Echinocactus texensis	Horse crippler cactus	SW. Oklahoma to NE. Mexico
