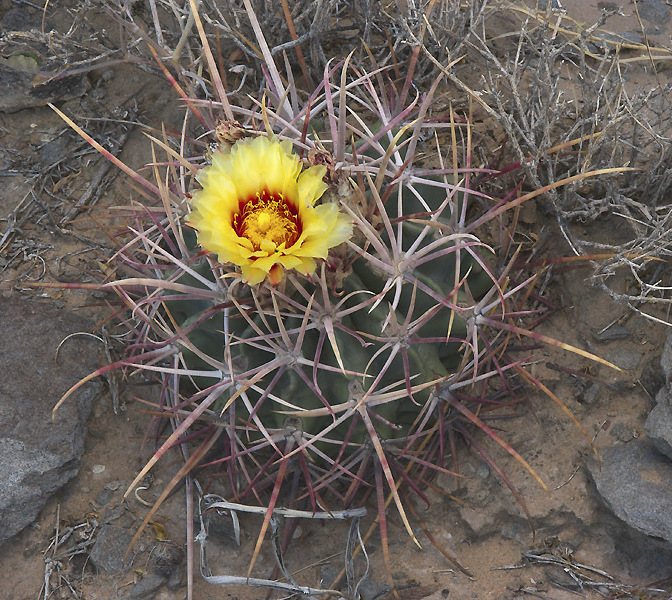

Conservation status
- Near Threatened (IUCN 3.1)

Scientific classification
- Kingdom: Plantae
- Clade: Embryophytes
- Clade: Tracheophytes
- Clade: Spermatophytes
- Clade: Angiosperms
- Clade: Eudicots
- Order: Caryophyllales
- Family: Cactaceae
- Subfamily: Cactoideae
- Genus: Homalocephala
- Species: H. parryi

Binomial name
- Homalocephala parryi (Engelm.) Vargas & Bárcenas

Synonyms
- Echinocactus parryi Engelm.; Emorycactus parryi (Engelm.) Doweld

= Homalocephala parryi =

Species of cactus

Homalocephala parryi, synonym Echinocactus parryi, also known as the horse crippler or devil's pincushion, is a cactus in the subfamily Cactoideae. It is endemic to Mexico ( northern Chihuahua). H. parryi is thought to be quite similar to H. polycephala, but they differ in their branching habits, average number of ribs per stem, flower color and more.

== Description ==
This barrel cactus, belonging to the Cactaceae family and Caryophyllales order, is a simple plant with globose to cylindrical stems that reach 16 to 25 cm in height and 21 to 30 cm in diameter. Its stems feature 13 to 21 tuberculate ribs marked by constrictions and transverse grooves. The areoles are circular in the vegetative areas and oval in the reproductive regions. The cactus bears 8 to 11 radial spines, which are white and vary in thickness and curvature; the upper spines are thin, the lateral ones are thicker, and the lower ones spread outwards. Four central spines are present, which are thick and ringed, with the upper and lower spines being the thickest, longest, and hooked. Its yellow flowers have a red throat, and the succulent woolly fruit eventually dries. The seeds are black.

== Distribution ==
This species is endemic to northern Chihuahua, Mexico, specifically found in the Samalayuca dunes, near Laguna Guzmán, and close to La Noria. It thrives at elevations between 1100 and 1300 meters in rocky soils within xerophytic scrublands and grasslands growing on rocky slopes.

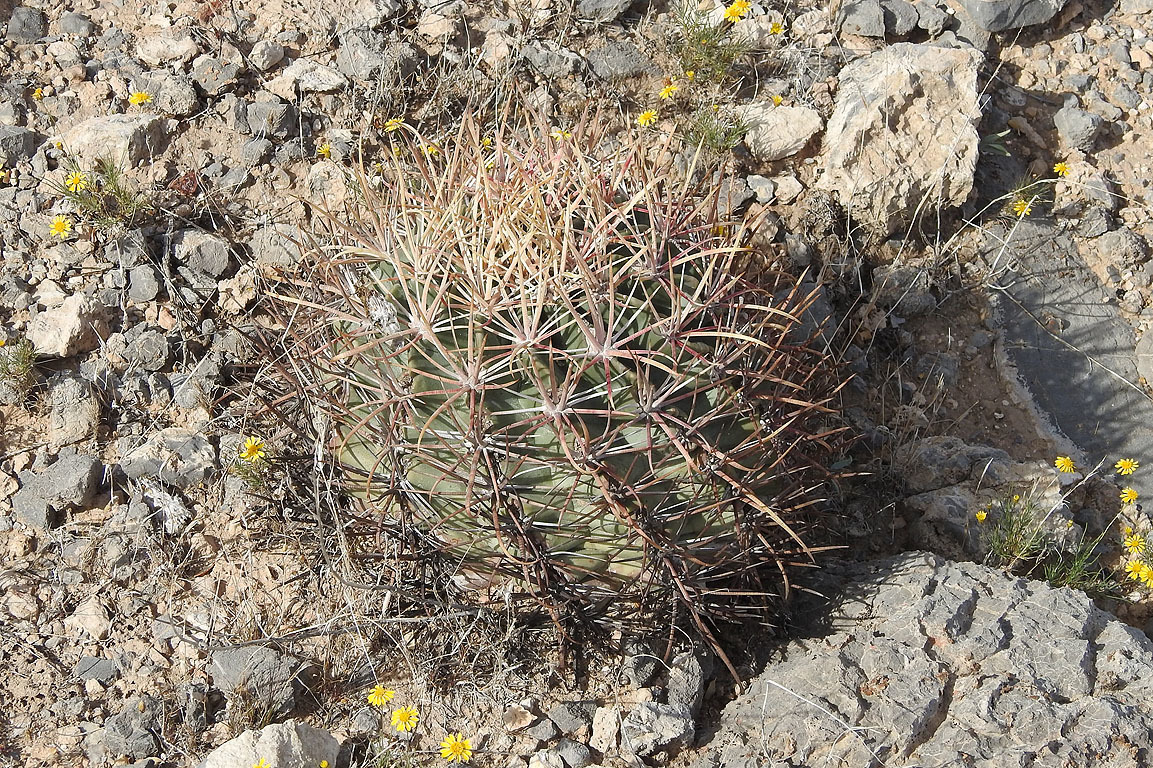
Plant growing in Ojo de la Punta, Chihuahua, Mexico

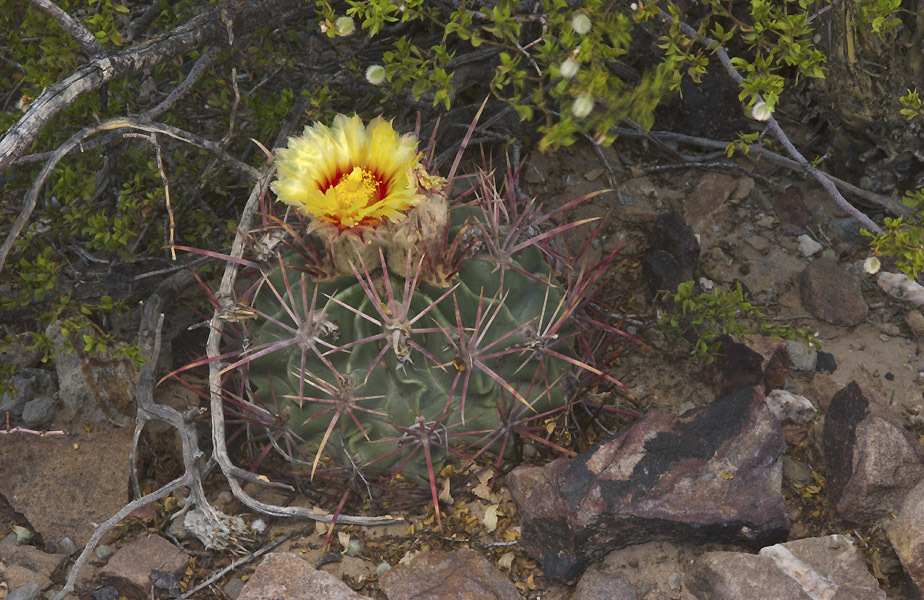
Habitat in El Lobo, Chihuahua, Mexico

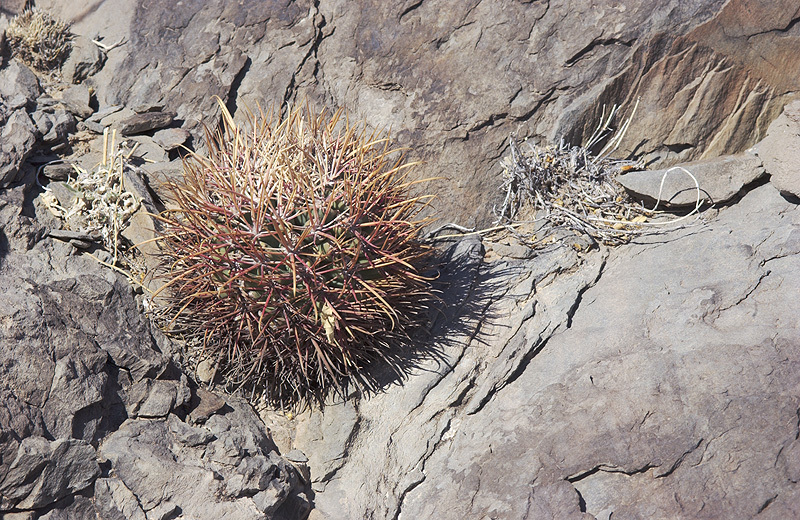
Habitat in Samalayuca, Chihuahua, Mexico

== Taxonomy ==
Originally described as Echinocactus parryi by George Engelmann in 1856, the species name honors botanist Dr. Charles Parry. In 2018, Mario Daniel Vargas-Luna and Rolando T. Bárcenas reclassified it into the genus Homalocephala.
