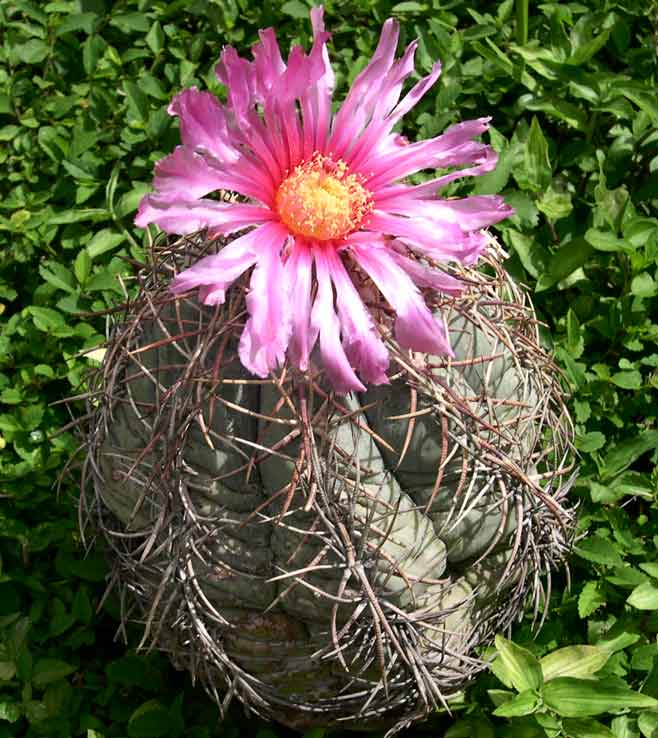

Conservation status
- Apparently Secure (NatureServe)

Scientific classification
- Kingdom: Plantae
- Clade: Tracheophytes
- Clade: Angiosperms
- Clade: Eudicots
- Order: Caryophyllales
- Family: Cactaceae
- Subfamily: Cactoideae
- Genus: Echinocactus
- Species: E. horizonthalonius

Binomial name
- Echinocactus horizonthalonius Lem.

= Echinocactus horizonthalonius =

Species of cactus

Echinocactus horizonthalonius is a species of cactus known by several common names, including devilshead, turk's head cactus, blue barrel cactus, eagle's claw, horse maimer, horse crippler, and visnaga meloncillo. It is native to the southwestern United States and northern Mexico, where it occurs in Chihuahuan Desert and Sonoran Desert habitats, particularly on limestone substrates. One of its varieties is a federally listed endangered species of the United States.

== Description ==
This cactus is gray-green to blue-gray in color and spherical, hemispherical, columnar, or flat-topped in shape. It reaches a maximum size of about 45 centimeters tall by 20 wide. The body is made up of curving sections that twist around the body in a helical fashion. These sections are lined with areoles bearing up to 10 spines each. The pink, gray, or brown spines may be over 4 centimeters long.

The bright pink to magenta flowers are up to 7 to 9 centimeters wide. Flowers open around midday and close for the night. They also open after the plant receives rainfall, and although most of the flowers occur in June, they may bloom again in late summer and fall if rain occurs.

The fruit is hairy or woolly and pink or red in color.

Varieties

The species is generally divided into two varieties.

- The more common, Echinocactus horizonthalonius var. horizonthalonius, can be found in Chihuahuan Desert habitats, from Arizona, through New Mexico, into Texas and Northeastern Mexico. USDA: Echinocactus horizonthalonius var. horizonthalonius
- The rare Echinocactus horizonthalonius var. nicholii, Nichol's turk's head cactus, is known only from three Sonoran Desert populations in southeastern Arizona, and one in Sonora, Mexico. It is federally listed as an endangered species of the United States. Some populations are protected within Ironwood Forest National Monument in Pinal and Pima counties in Arizona. Threats to the species include limestone mining, offroading, and collection of specimens for their showy flowers. Buffelgrass is also a major threat to the species, due to its introduction of fire to the landscape. There has been some success in conserving this variety, mainly by suppressing buffelgrass.
