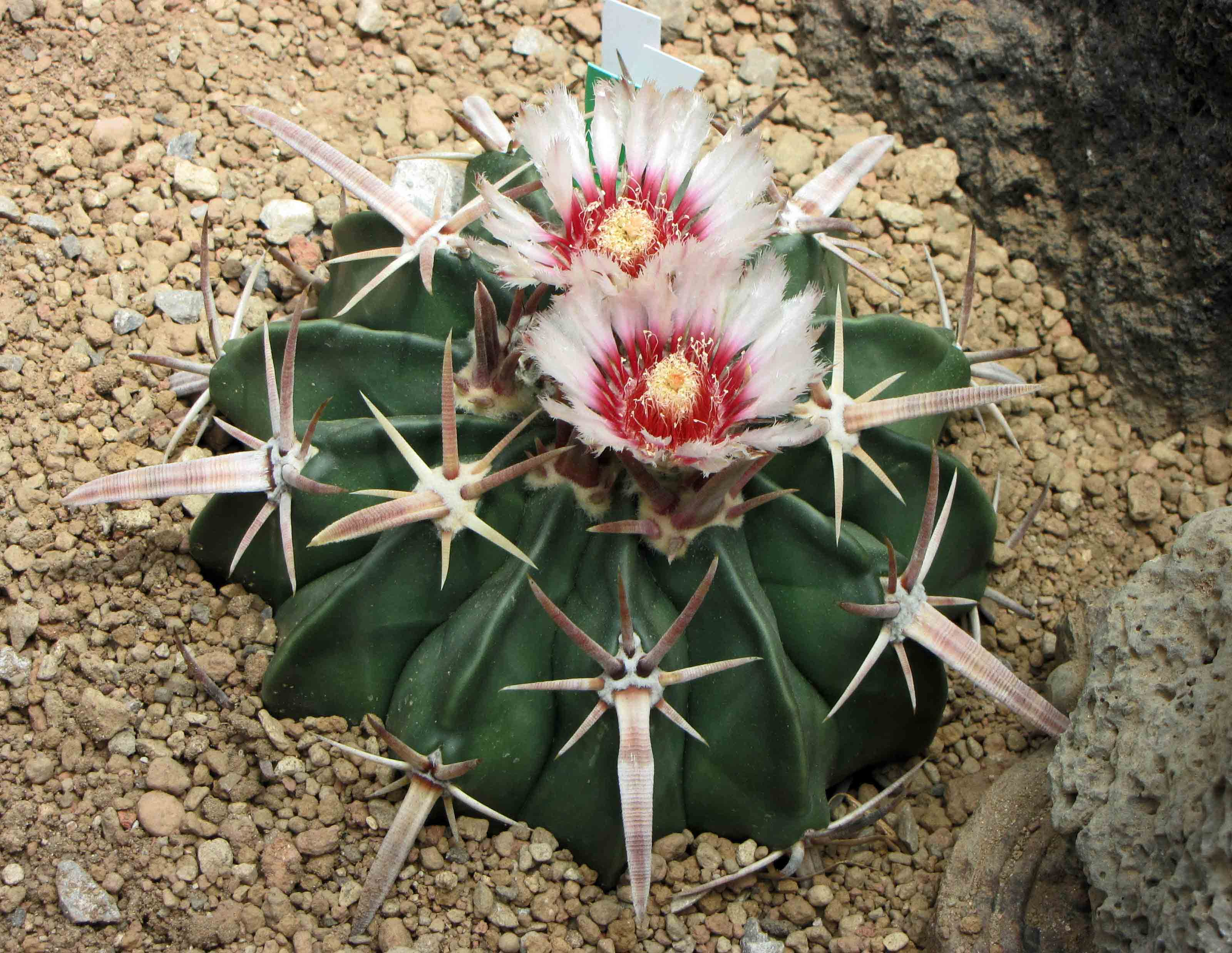

Conservation status
- Least Concern (IUCN 3.1)

Scientific classification
- Kingdom: Plantae
- Clade: Tracheophytes
- Clade: Angiosperms
- Clade: Eudicots
- Order: Caryophyllales
- Family: Cactaceae
- Subfamily: Cactoideae
- Genus: Homalocephala
- Species: H. texensis

Binomial name
- Homalocephala texensis (Hopffer) Britton & Rose

Synonyms
- Echinocactus texensis Hopffer 1842; Echinocactus courantianus Lem. 1853; Echinocactus lindheimeri Engelm. & A.Gray 1845; Echinocactus platycephalus Muehlenpf. 1848; Echinocactus texensis var. gourgensii Cels 1853; Echinocactus texensis var. longispinus Schelle 1907; Echinocactus texensis var. treculianus C.F.Först. 1885; Homalocephala texensis var. gourgensii (Cels ex Labour.) Y.Itô 1952

= Homalocephala texensis =

Species of cactus

Homalocephala texensis, synonyms including Echinocactus texensis, also known as the horse crippler or devil's pincushion, is a cactus in the subfamily Cactoideae. It is native to the United States and Mexico.

== Description ==
Homalocephala texensis, commonly known as the Texas star cactus, is a solitary cactus characterized by its flattened, spherical stems that can grow 12 to 20 centimeters tall and up to 30 centimeters in diameter. Its ribbed surface, featuring 13 to 27 ribs, is adorned with densely packed, stout, tapering reddish spines that exhibit conspicuous transverse banding. The single central spine, which is stiff, downward-curving, and flattened, measures 3 to 7.5 centimeters long, always exceeding the length of the radial spines. The 5 to 7 spreading, flattened radial spines range from 2.5 to 5 centimeters in length. This cactus produces light pink to white flowers with red centers, measuring 5 to 6 centimeters in both length and diameter. Its fleshy, red fruits, which ripen to approximately 5 centimeters in length, have a diameter of 2.5 to 3.8 centimeters.

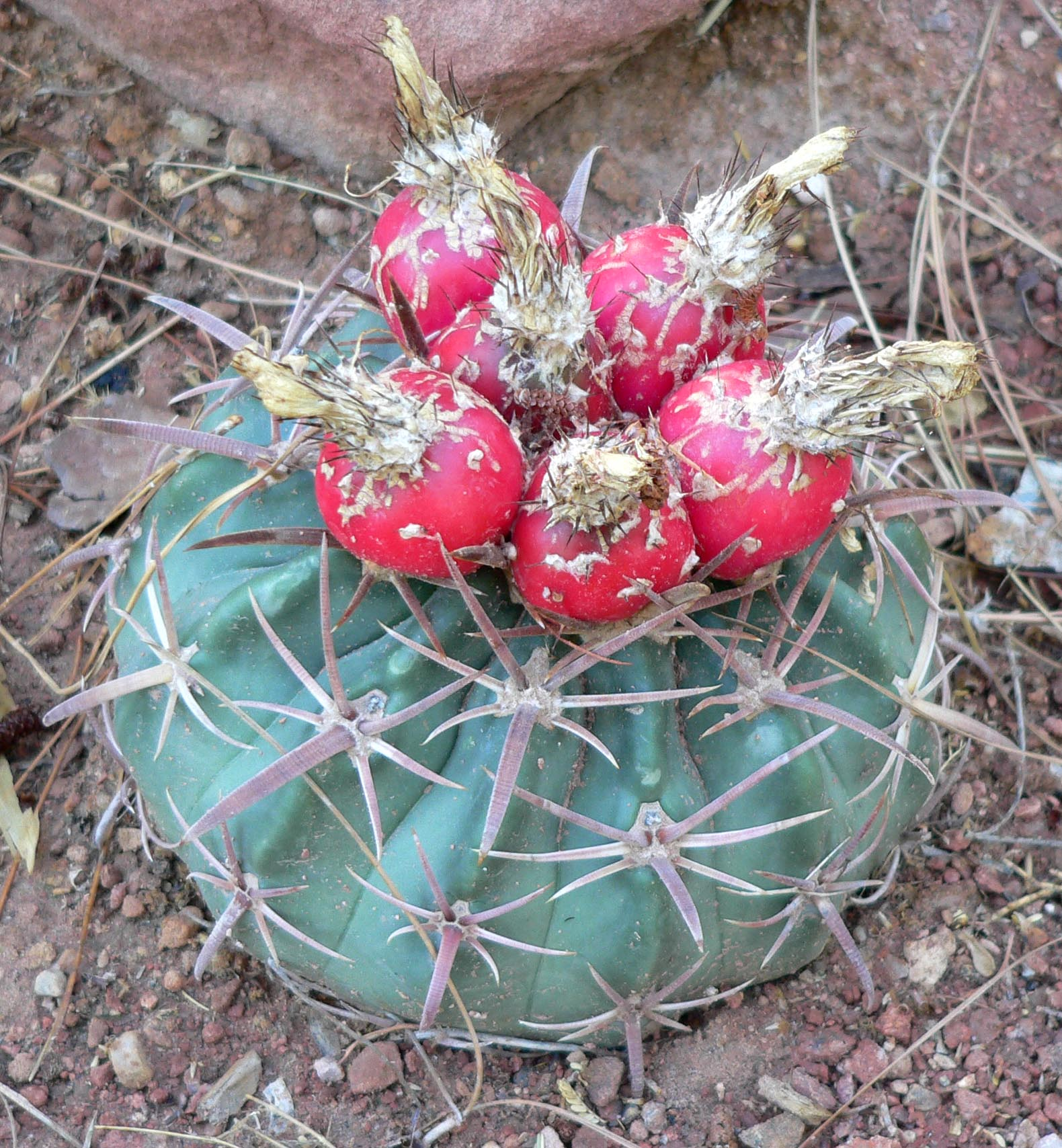
Fruits

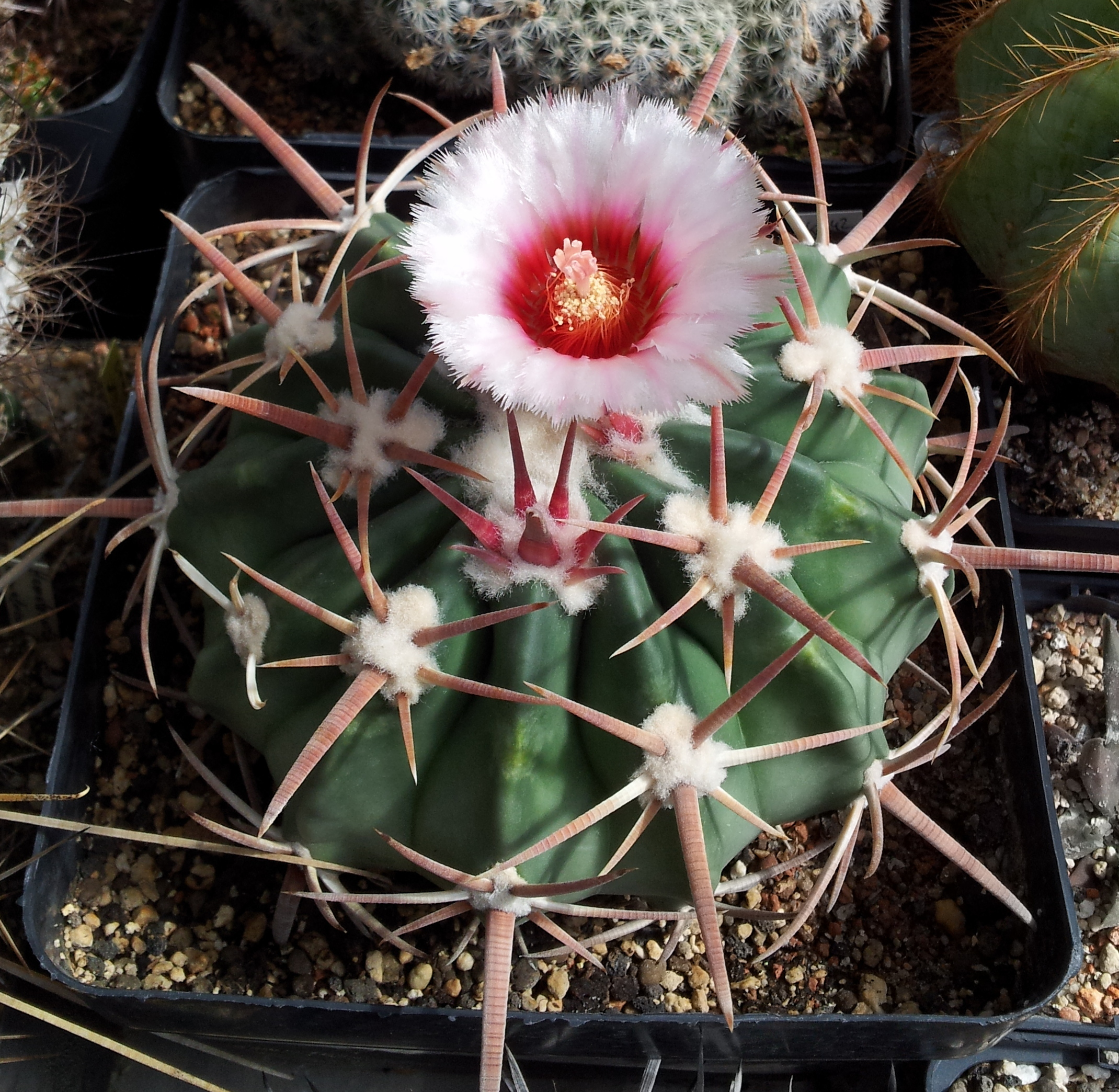
Flower

== Distribution ==
Homalocephala texensis is native to the Chihuahuan Desert, found in the Mexican states of Chihuahua, Coahuila, Nuevo León, and Tamaulipas, as well as in New Mexico, Oklahoma, and Texas in the United States at elevations between 0 and 1400 meters. This species is found growing in scrubland, limestone hills and oak woodlands.

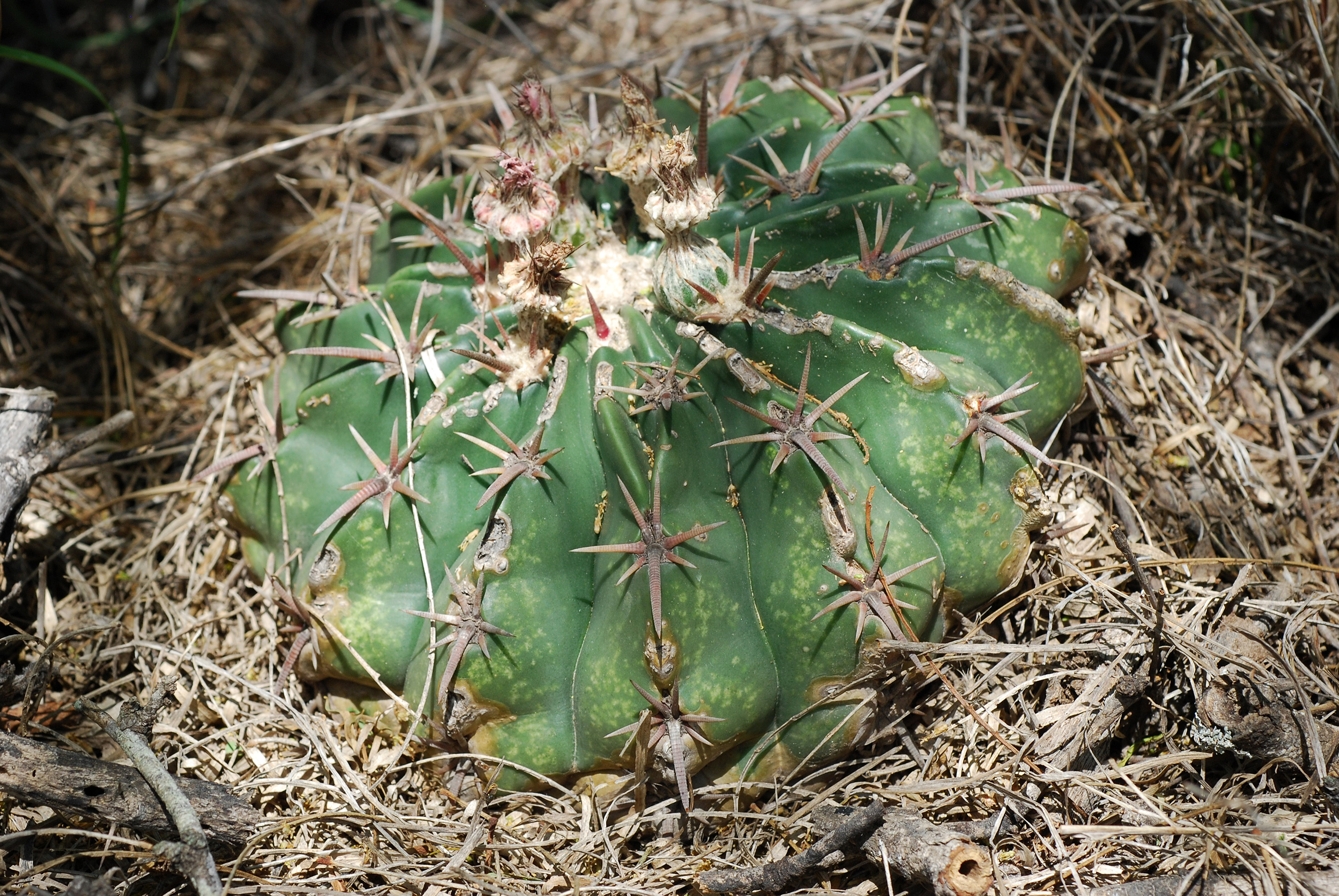
Plant growing in Camargito, Texas

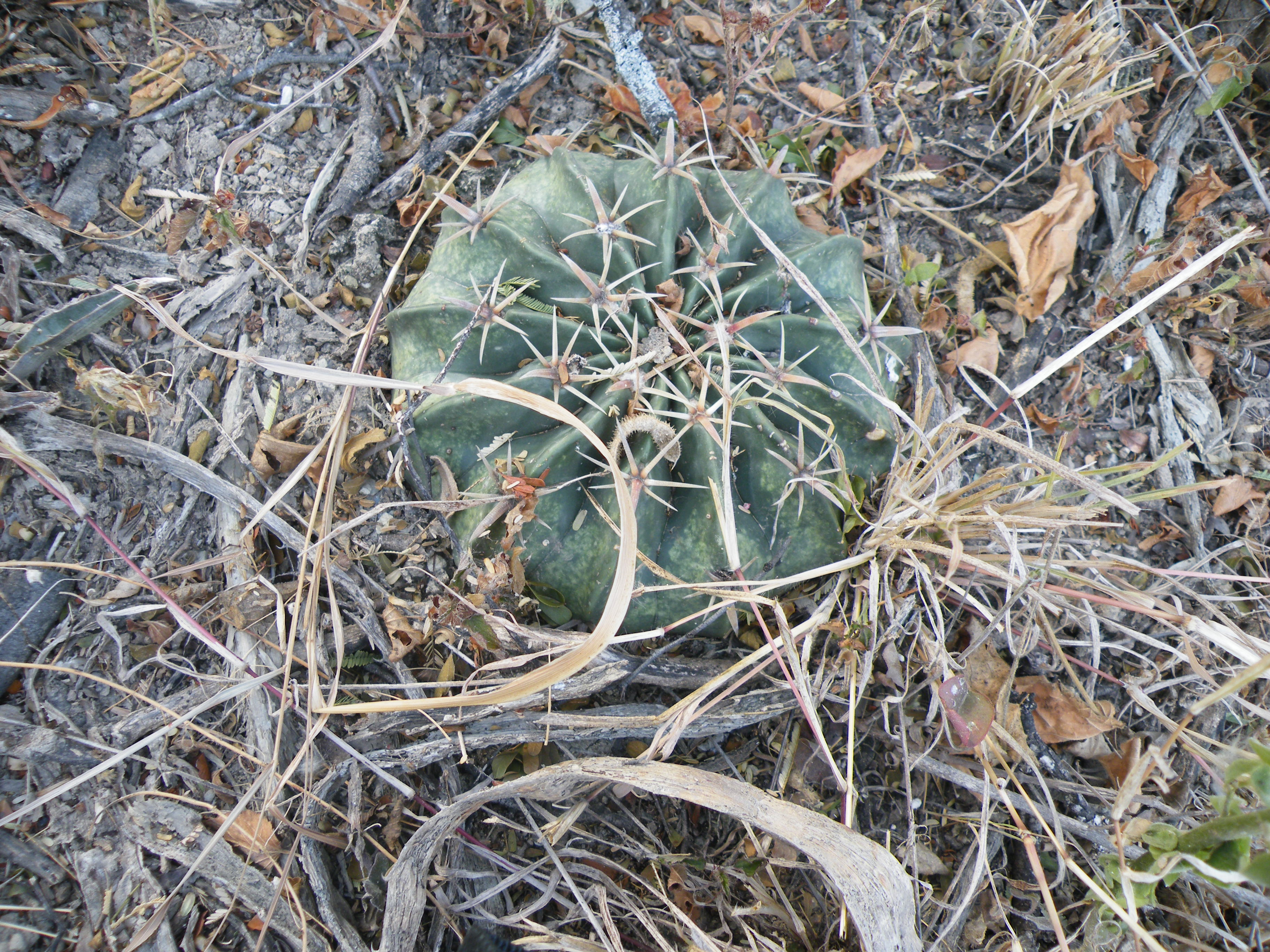
Plant growing in San Antonio, Tamaulipas

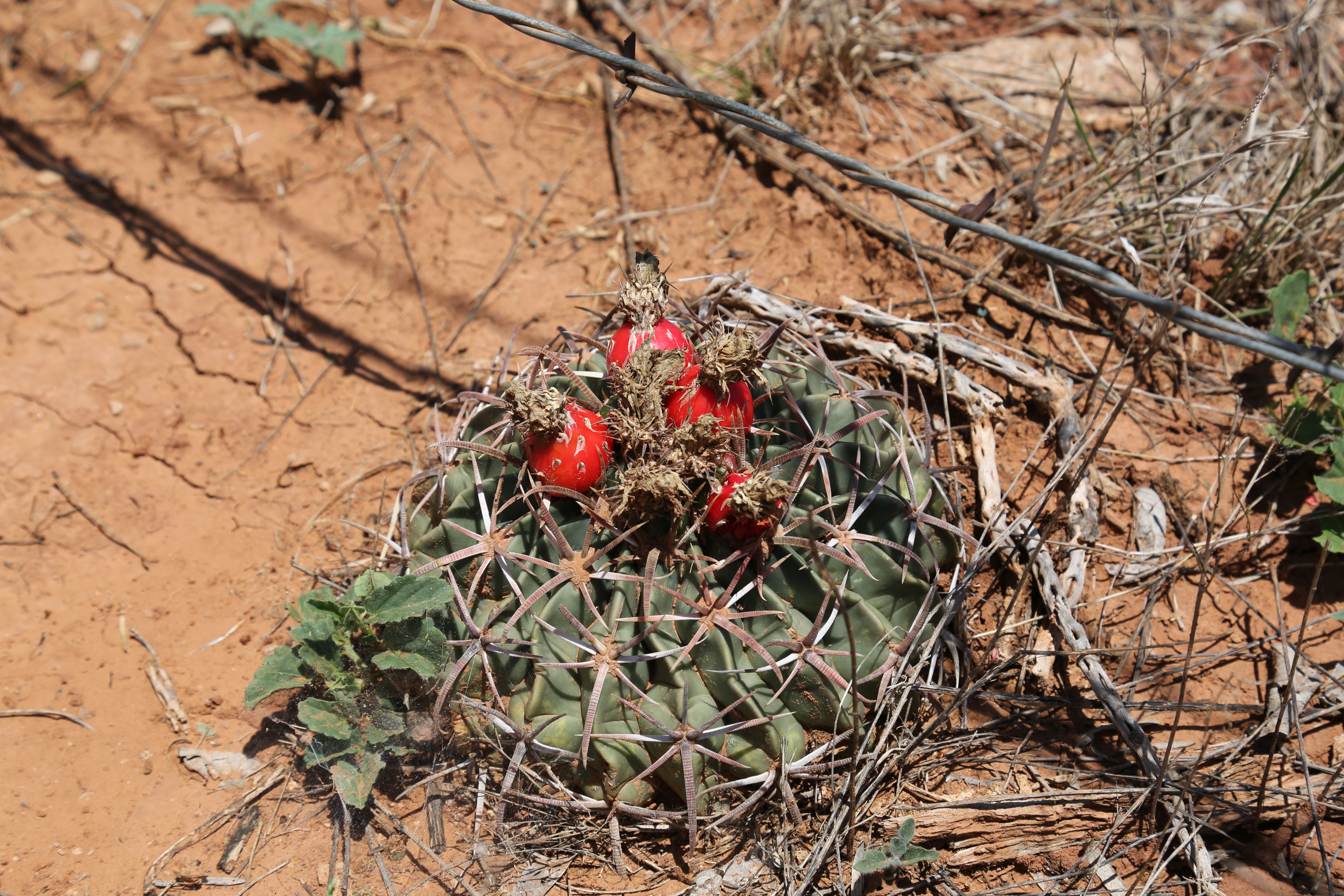
Plant fruiting in Truscott Brine Lake, Texas

== Taxonomy ==
The species was first described as Echinocactus texensis by Carl Hopffer in 1842, and later reclassified into the genus Homalocephala by Nathaniel Lord Britton and Joseph Nelson Rose in 1922.
