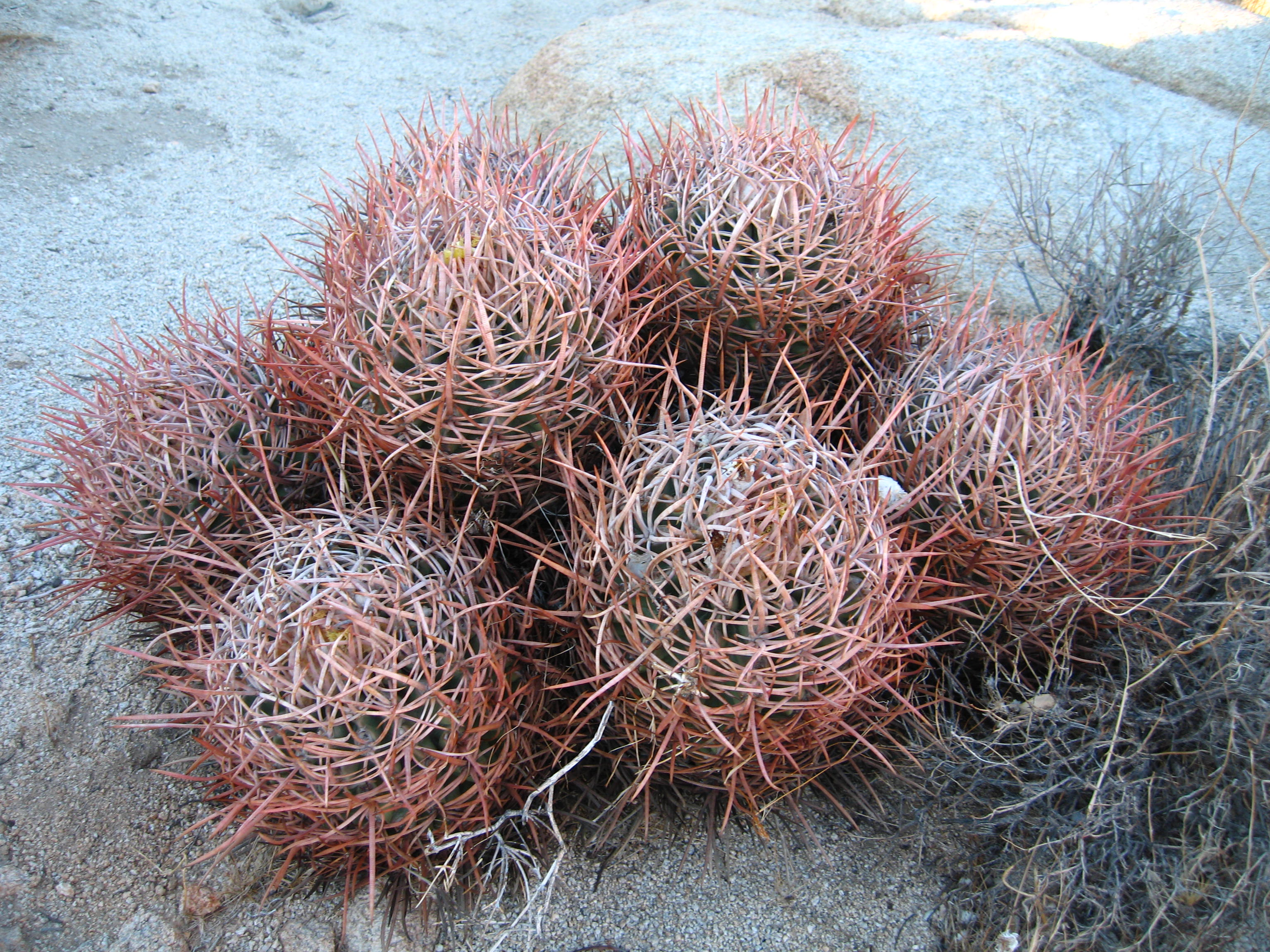

Conservation status
- Least Concern (IUCN 3.1)

Scientific classification
- Kingdom: Plantae
- Clade: Tracheophytes
- Clade: Angiosperms
- Clade: Eudicots
- Order: Caryophyllales
- Family: Cactaceae
- Subfamily: Cactoideae
- Genus: Homalocephala
- Species: H. polycephala

Binomial name
- Homalocephala polycephala Engelm. & J.M.Bigelow

Synonyms
- Echinocactus polycephalus Engelm. & J.M.Bigelow; Emorycactus polycephalus (Engelm. & J.M.Bigelow) Doweld

= Homalocephala polycephala =

Cotton top cactus

Species of cactus

Homalocephala polycephala, synonym Echinocactus polycephalus, is a cactus that is native to the United States and Mexico.

== Description ==
The stems of Homalocephala polycephala are sometimes solitary, but more often in clusters of as many as 30, grow 30 to 60 centimeters tall and 10 to 20 centimeters in diameter. Its stems are marked by 13 to 21 ribs. The areoles bear four central spines, which are reddish with a slight purplish hue and become gray with age; these spines are irregularly arranged, with the lowest one curving downwards and the others generally straight and crisscrossed. The central spines reach lengths of 6–7.5 cm. The spines are yellow to red. Additionally, 6 to 8 radial spines, also irregularly distributed, are similar in appearance to the central spines and measure 3–4.5 cm long. The cactus produces yellow flowers, each with a central pink stripe, measuring approximately 5 cm in both length and diameter. The fruits are densely woolly covered in white hairs that are 1.2 to 2 cm long, giving the common name cotton top cactus. The tendency of the cactus to cluster causes it to also be called many-headed barrel cactus.

They have a reputation for being difficult in cultivation, and are rarely seen in cactus collections.

== Distribution ==
It occurs in the Mojave Desert region of Arizona, California, and Nevada, and also occurs in the Sonoran Desert region of southern California and northern Sonora, Mexico, growing on rocky hills and slopes at elevations between 30 and 750 meters. The plants grow in some of the most extreme arid environments in the American Southwest, such as Death Valley National Park, and the Mojave National Preserve of Southern California.

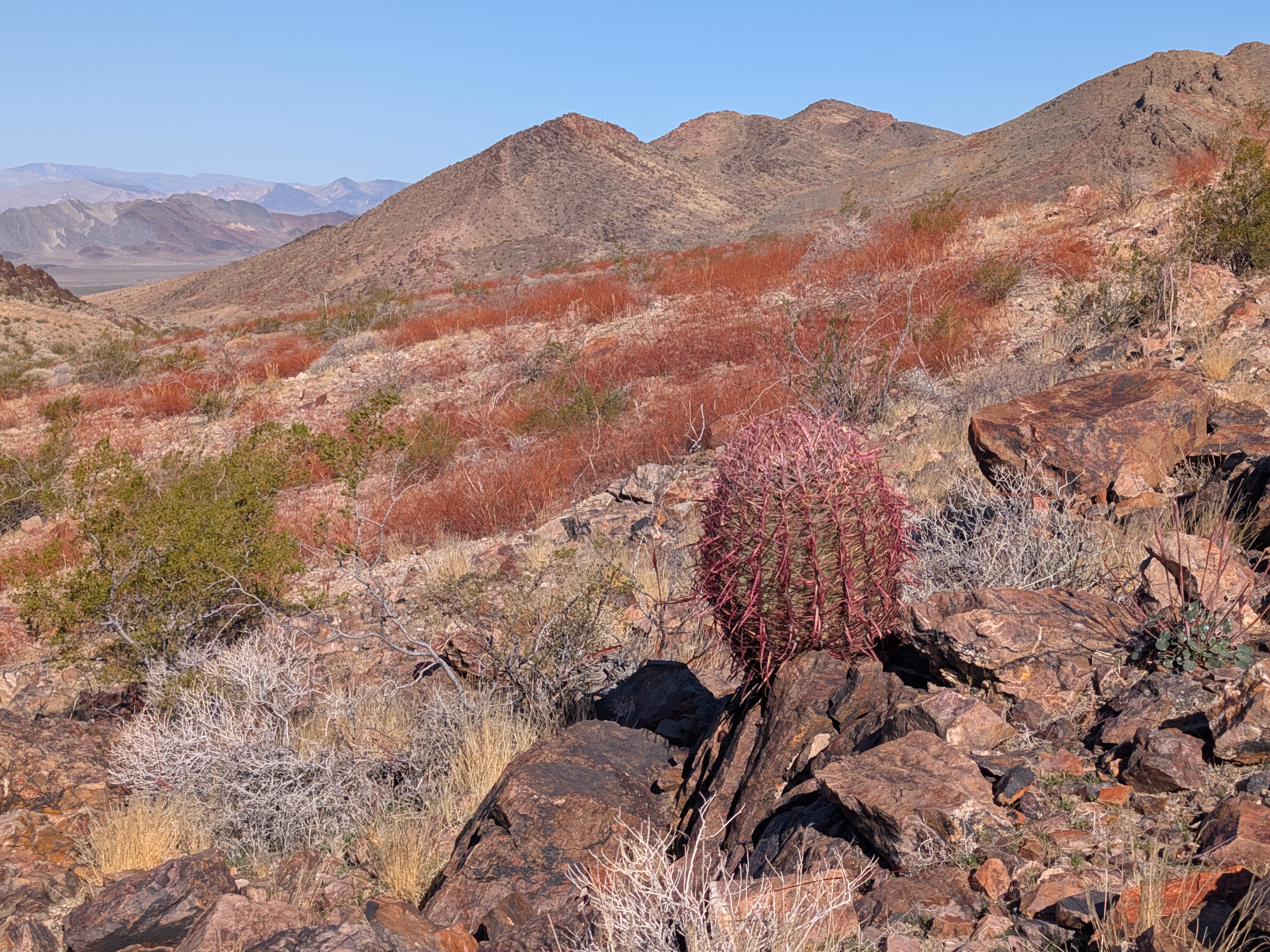
Plant growing in habitat near Tecopa, California

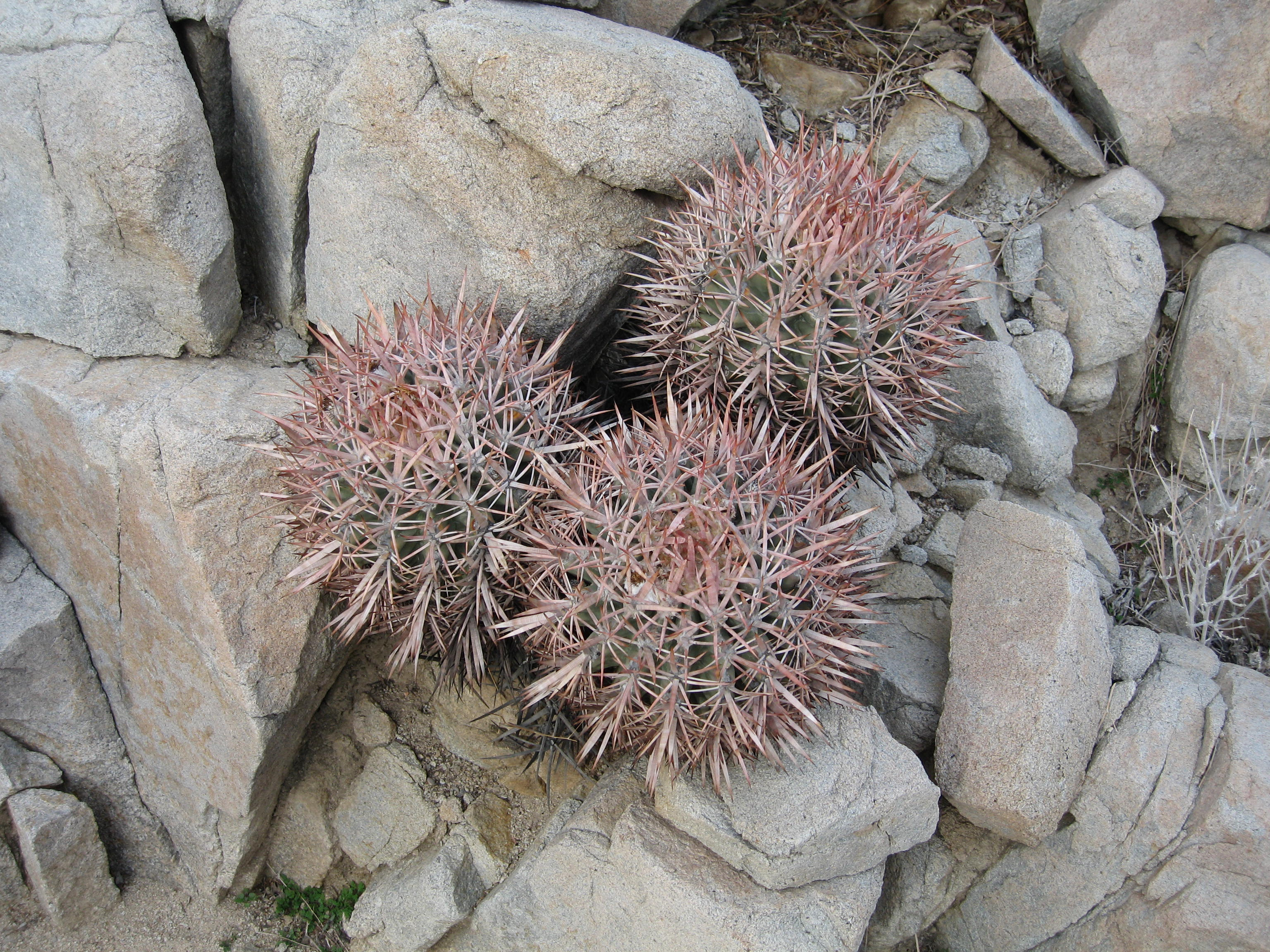
habitat in Joshua Tree National Park

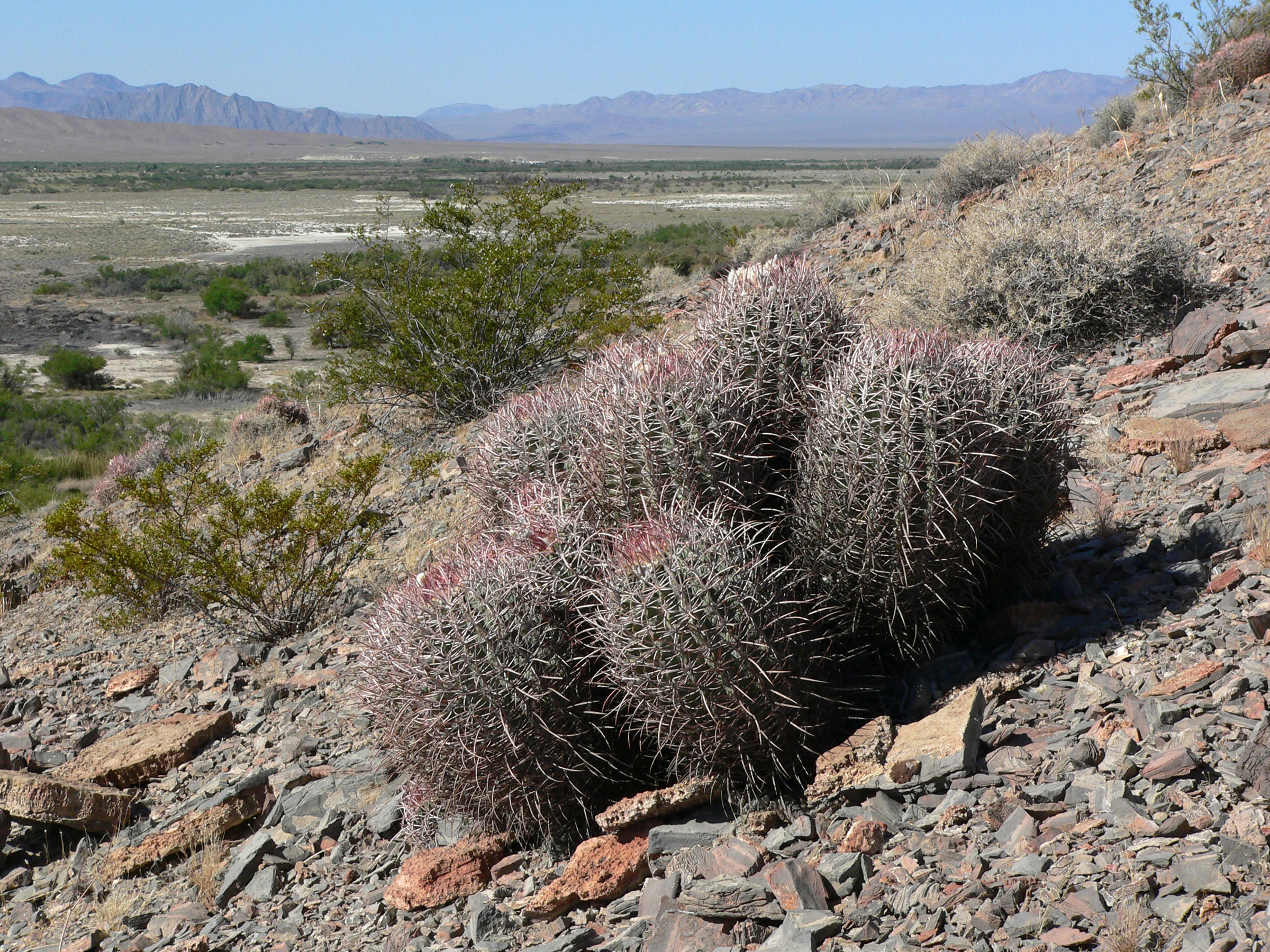
Plant growing in Point of Rocks, Ash Meadows National Wildlife Refuge

== Taxonomy ==
Originally described as Echinocactus polycephalus in 1856 by George Engelmann and John Milton Bigelow, the species was reclassified into the genus Homalocephala in 2018 by Vargas-Luna and Bárcenas, with the specific epithet "polycephala" translating to "with many heads."
