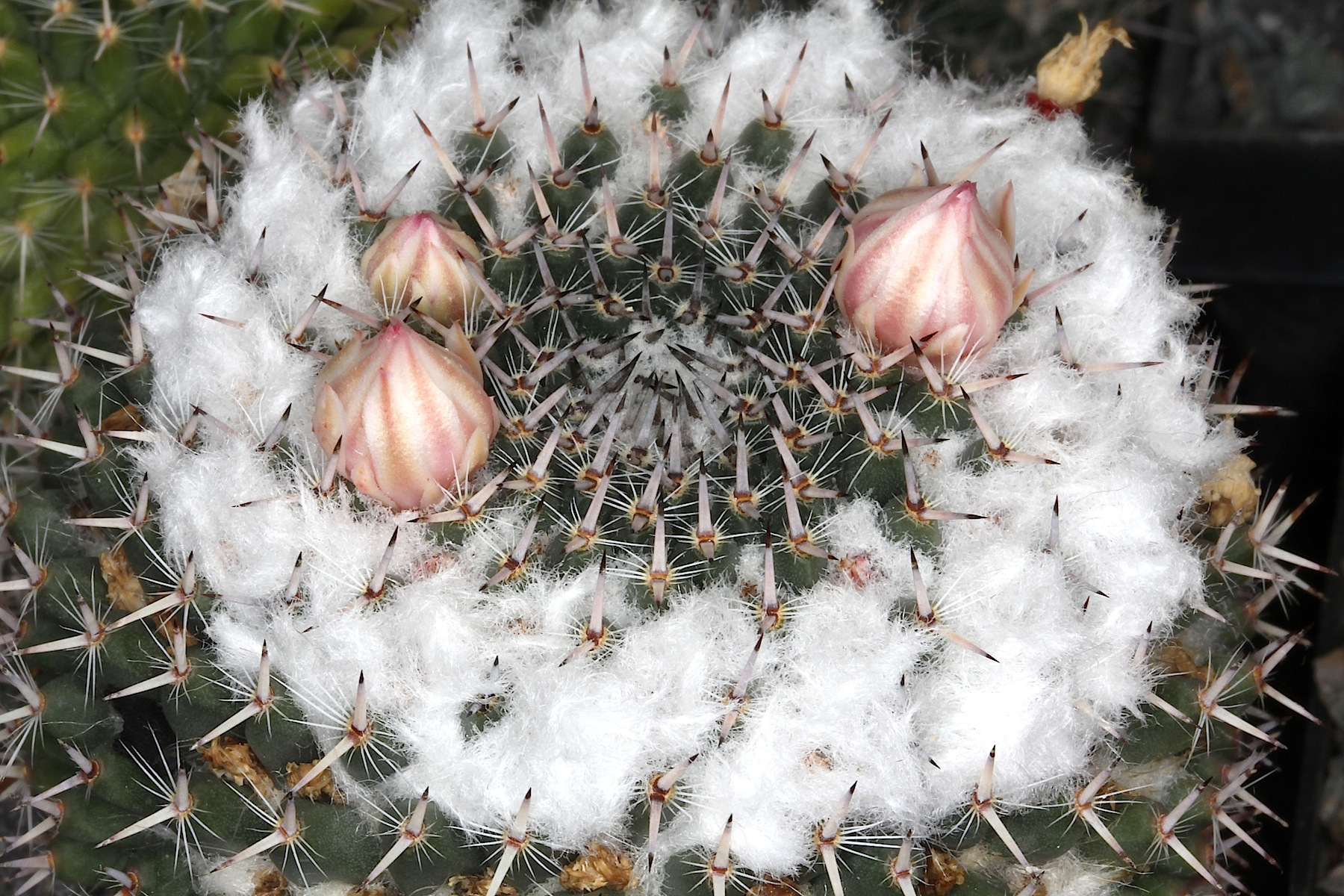
- Mammillaria formosa
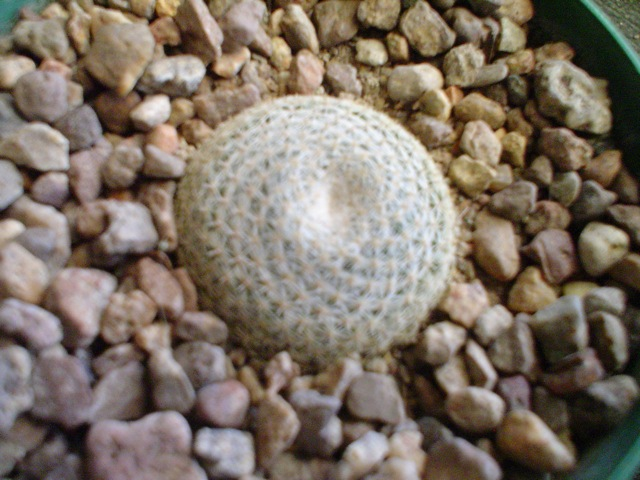
- Mammillaria formosa subsp. microthele

Conservation status
- Endangered (IUCN 3.1)

Scientific classification
- Kingdom: Plantae
- Clade: Tracheophytes
- Clade: Angiosperms
- Clade: Eudicots
- Order: Caryophyllales
- Family: Cactaceae
- Subfamily: Cactoideae
- Genus: Mammillaria
- Species: M. formosa

Binomial name
- Mammillaria formosa Galeotti ex Scheidw.

Subspecies
- Mammillaria formosa subsp. formosa; Mammillaria formosa subsp. microthele (Muehlenpf.) D.R.Hunt

Synonyms
- Cactus formosus (Galeotti ex Scheidw.) Kuntze; Neomammillaria formosa (Galeotti ex Scheidw.) Britton & Rose; Neomammillaria neoformosa (Galeotti ex Scheidw.) Y.Itô; synonyms of subsp. formosa: Mammillaria arroyensis Repp.; Mammillaria crucigera Salm-Dyck; Mammillaria formosa var. dispicula Monv. ex Labour.; Mammillaria formosa var. gracilispina Monv. ex Labour.; Mammillaria formosa var. laevior Monv. ex Labour.; Mammillaria julianae Rodr.González & Linzen; synonyms of subsp. microthele: Mammillaria brongniartii Salm-Dyck; Mammillaria compacta Salm-Dyck; Mammillaria formosa var. microthele (Muehlenpf.) Salm-Dyck; Mammillaria microthele Muehlenpf.; Mammillaria microthele var. brongniartii Salm-Dyck

= Mammillaria formosa =

Species of cactus

Mammillaria microthele is a species of flowering plant in the family Cactaceae. It is a succulent cactus subshrub endemic to northeastern Mexico. It grows under bushes in xerophytic shrubland (matorral), on hills and plains of the Mexican Plateau in the states of Coahuila, Nuevo León, San Luis Potosí, Tamaulipas, and Zacatecas.

Two subspecies are accepted:

- Mammillaria formosa subsp. formosa
- Mammillaria formosa subsp. microthele (Muehlenpf.) D.R.Hunt – southern Tamaulipas to north-central San Luis Potosí
