= Mühlenpfordt =

Mühlenpfordt is a German surname. Notable people with the surname include:

- Justus Mühlenpfordt (1911–2000), German nuclear physicist
- Philipp August Friedrich Mühlenpfordt (1803–1891), German botanist
