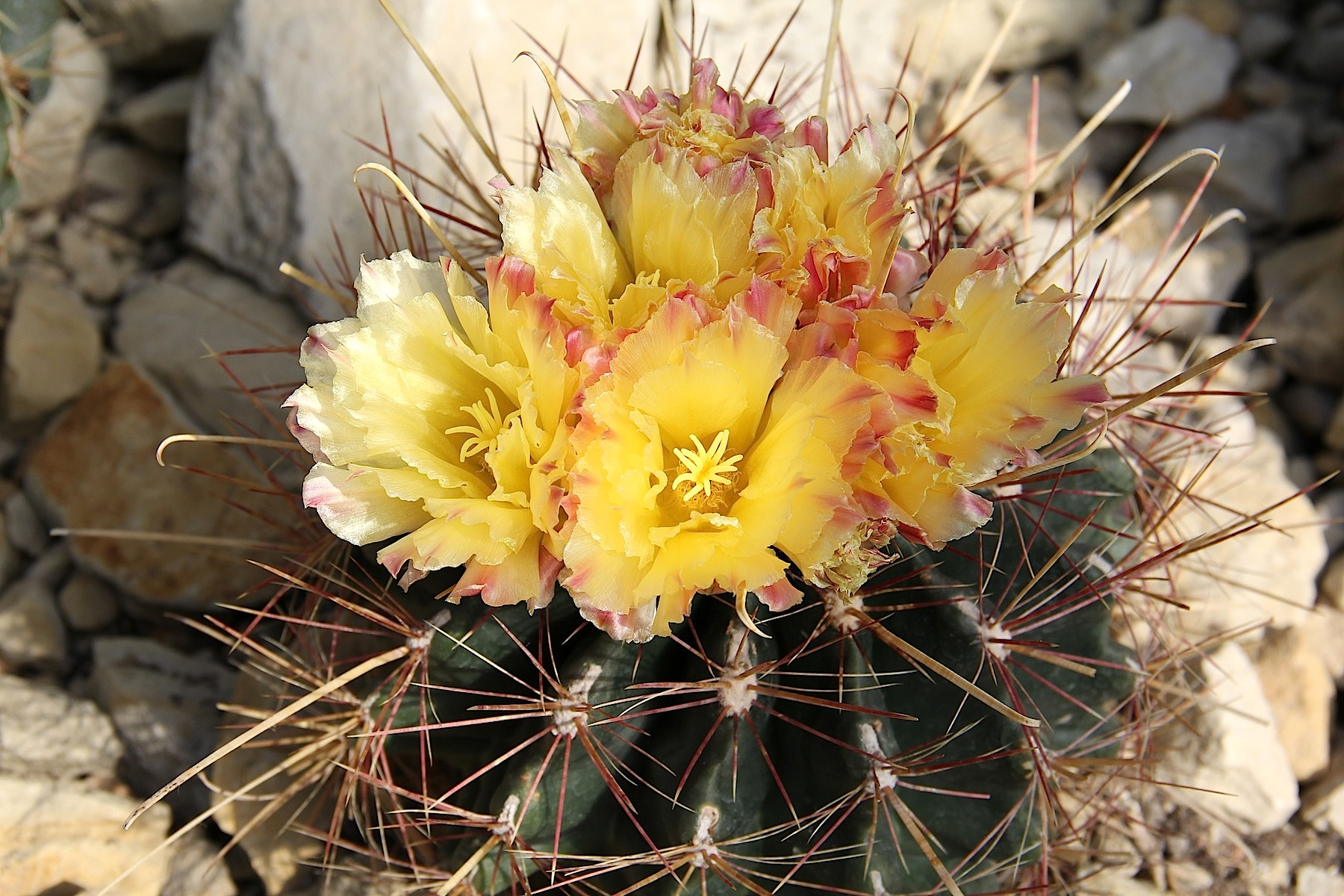

Conservation status
- Least Concern (IUCN 3.1)

Scientific classification
- Kingdom: Plantae
- Clade: Tracheophytes
- Clade: Angiosperms
- Clade: Eudicots
- Order: Caryophyllales
- Family: Cactaceae
- Subfamily: Cactoideae
- Genus: Ferocactus
- Species: F. hamatacanthus

Binomial name
- Ferocactus hamatacanthus (Muel.)

Synonyms
- List: Brittonia davisii Houghton & C.A.Armstr.; Echinocactus flexispinus Engelm.; Echinocactus gerardii F.A.C.Weber; Echinocactus haematochroanthus Hemsl.; Echinocactus hamatacanthus Muehlenpf.; Echinocactus hamatacanthus var. brevispinus (Engelm.) J.M.Coult.; Echinocactus hamatacanthus var. longihamatus (Galeotti ex Pfeiff.) J.M.Coult.; Echinocactus longihamatus var. brevispinus Engelm.; Echinocactus longihamatus f. brevispinus (Engelm.) Schelle; Echinocactus longihamatus var. crassispinus Engelm.; Echinocactus longihamatus gracilispinus Engelm.; Echinocactus sinuatus A.Dietr.; Echinocactus uncinatus Engelm. ex Scheer; Ferocactus hamatacanthus var. crassispinus (Engelm.) L.D.Benson; Hamatocactus hamatacanthus (Muehlenpf.) F.M.Knuth; Hamatocactus hamatacanthus var. davisii (Houghton & C.A.Armstr.) W.T.Marshall

= Ferocactus hamatacanthus =

Species of cactus

Ferocactus hamatacanthus, commonly named Turk's head, is a barrel cactus in the tribe Cacteae.

== Description ==
Ferocactus hamatacanthus forms to be solitary, usually a globular to oblong shape, and grows up to 60 centimetres (24 in). This plant contains 13 ribs normally, but can sometimes be around 17. These ribs of the cactus are strongly tubercled and are generally 2 centimetres (0.79 in) to 3 centimetres (1.2 in) high. Its aeroles are large and 1 centimetre (0.39 in) to 3 centimetres (1.2 in) apart. There are about 12 radial spines, 5 centimetres (2.0 in) to 7 centimetres (2.8 in) long, that are acicular and terete. However, there are fewer central spines, only 4, that tend to be angled and elongated at around 15 centimetres (5.9 in). One of the central spines is hooked at its apex as well.

This cactus' flowers are large, usually 7 centimetres (2.8 in) to 8 centimetres (3.1 in), and display a yellow color with an inner scarlet color in some forms. This cactus also produces a fruit that is oblong, 2 centimetres (0.79 in) to 5 centimetres (2.0 in) long, fleshy, edible, and a dark brown to drab-color (not red). In addition to these features, its seeds are pitted.

=== Features ===
Ferocactus hamatacanthus develops elongated glands, usually 2 centimetres (0.79 in) to 4 centimetres (1.6 in), in the aeroles between the flower and the spines. At first, these glands are soft, but as they mature they become hard and spine-like. Another key feature is the difference of its fruit compared to other species. The fruit of this species is thin and the flesh is very juicy and edible, reminiscent of kiwis in flavor.

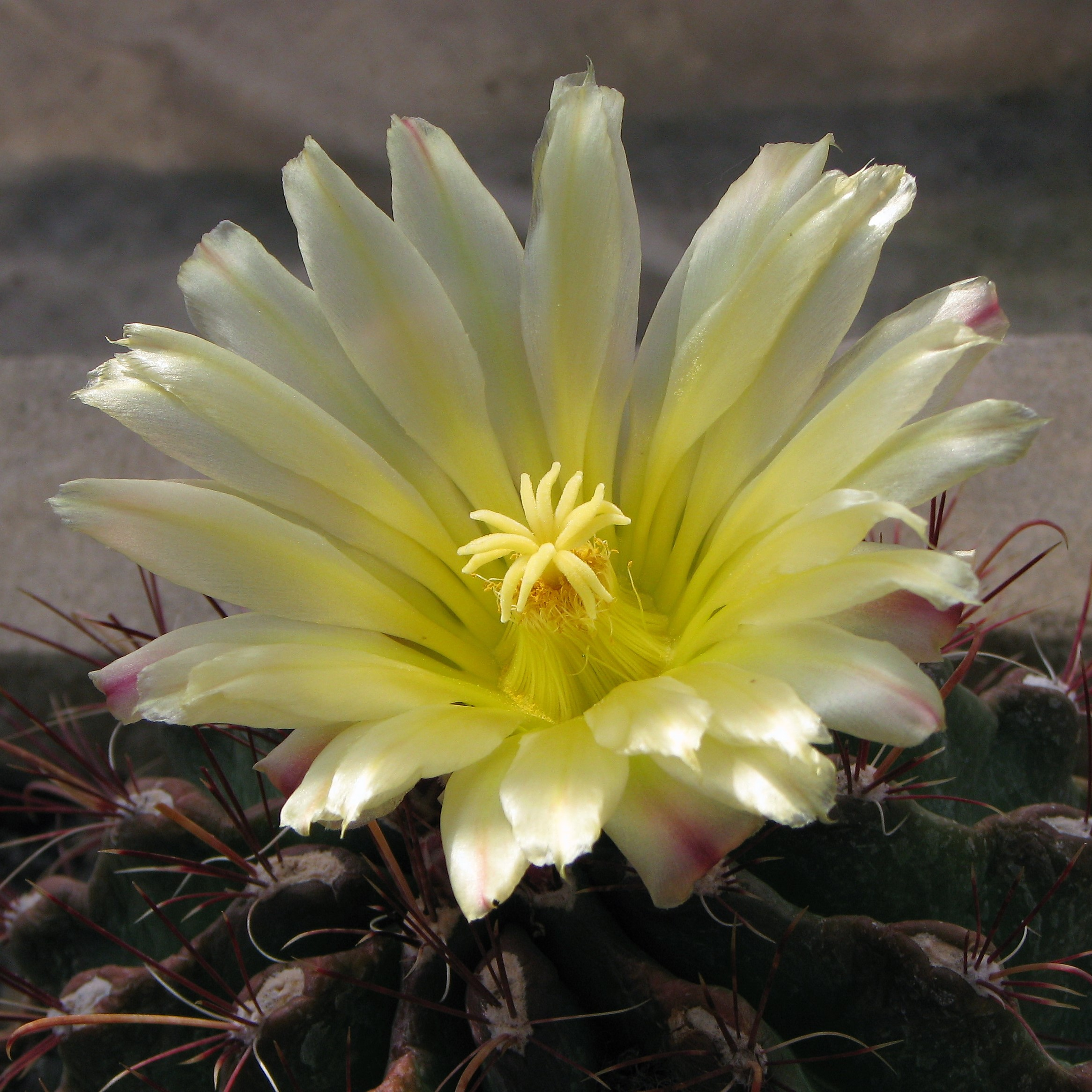
Flower

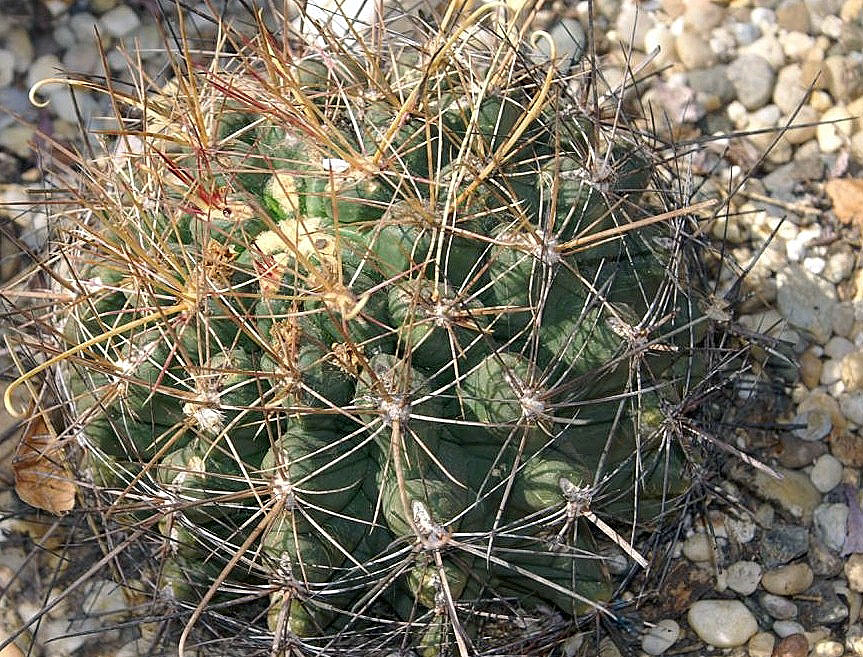
Plant

=== Subspecies ===
Accepted subspecies:

Image	Name	Distribution
	Ferocactus hamatacanthus subsp. hamatacanthus	New Mexico to Texas and Mexico
	Ferocactus hamatacanthus subsp. sinuatus (A.Dietr.) N.P.Taylor	Texas to Mexico

== Distribution ==
Ferocactus hamatacanthus is widespread in the Chihuahuan Desert of north-western Mexico in the states of Chihuahua, Coahuila, Durango, Nuevo León, and San Luis Potosi; and in New Mexico, and south-western Texas near El Paso growing in limestone crevices at elevations of 700 to 200 meters. The Ferocactus hamatacanthus Type Locality was found in Mexico.

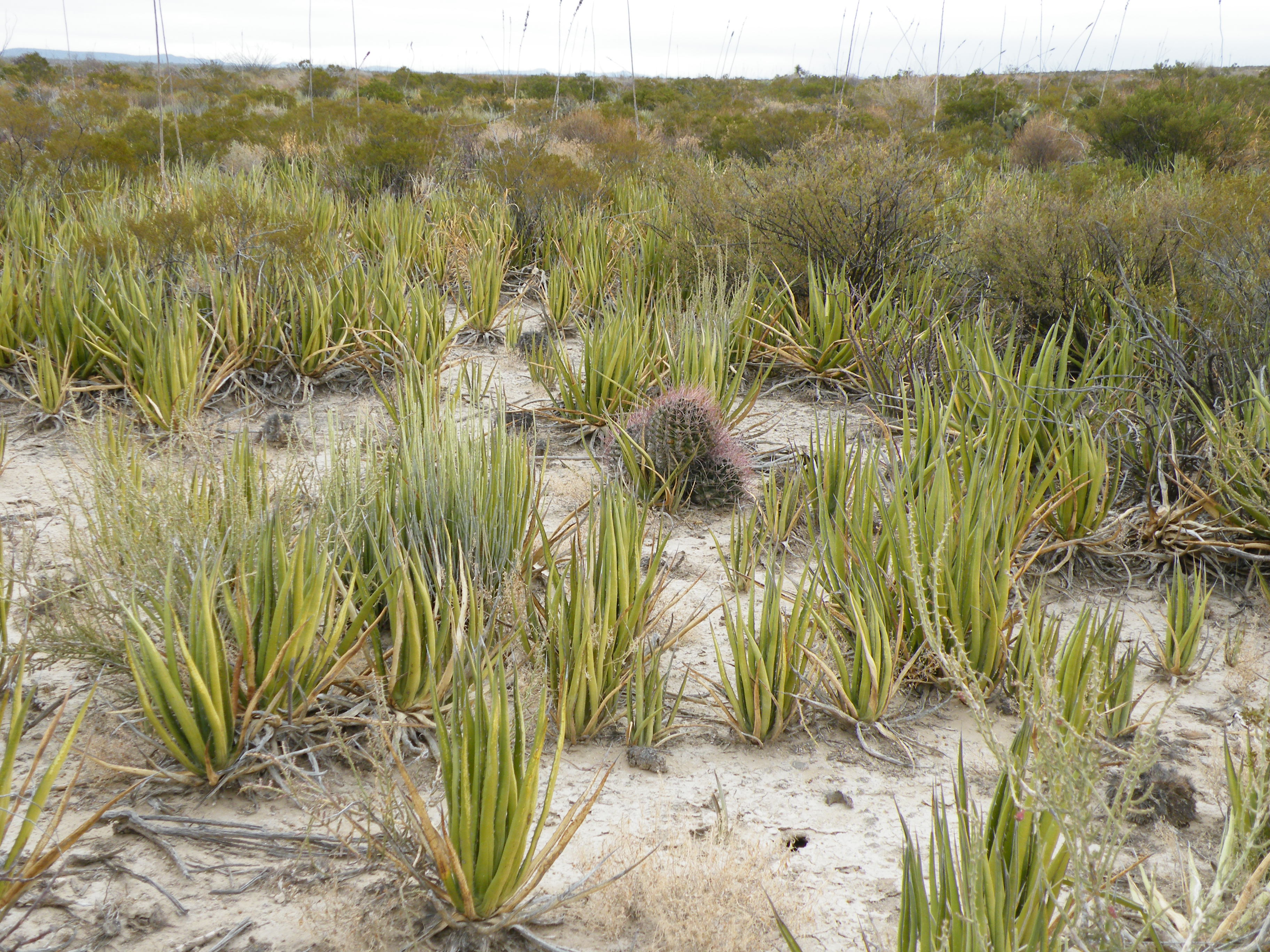
Plant growing in habitat north of Piedra Blanca with Agave lechuguilla

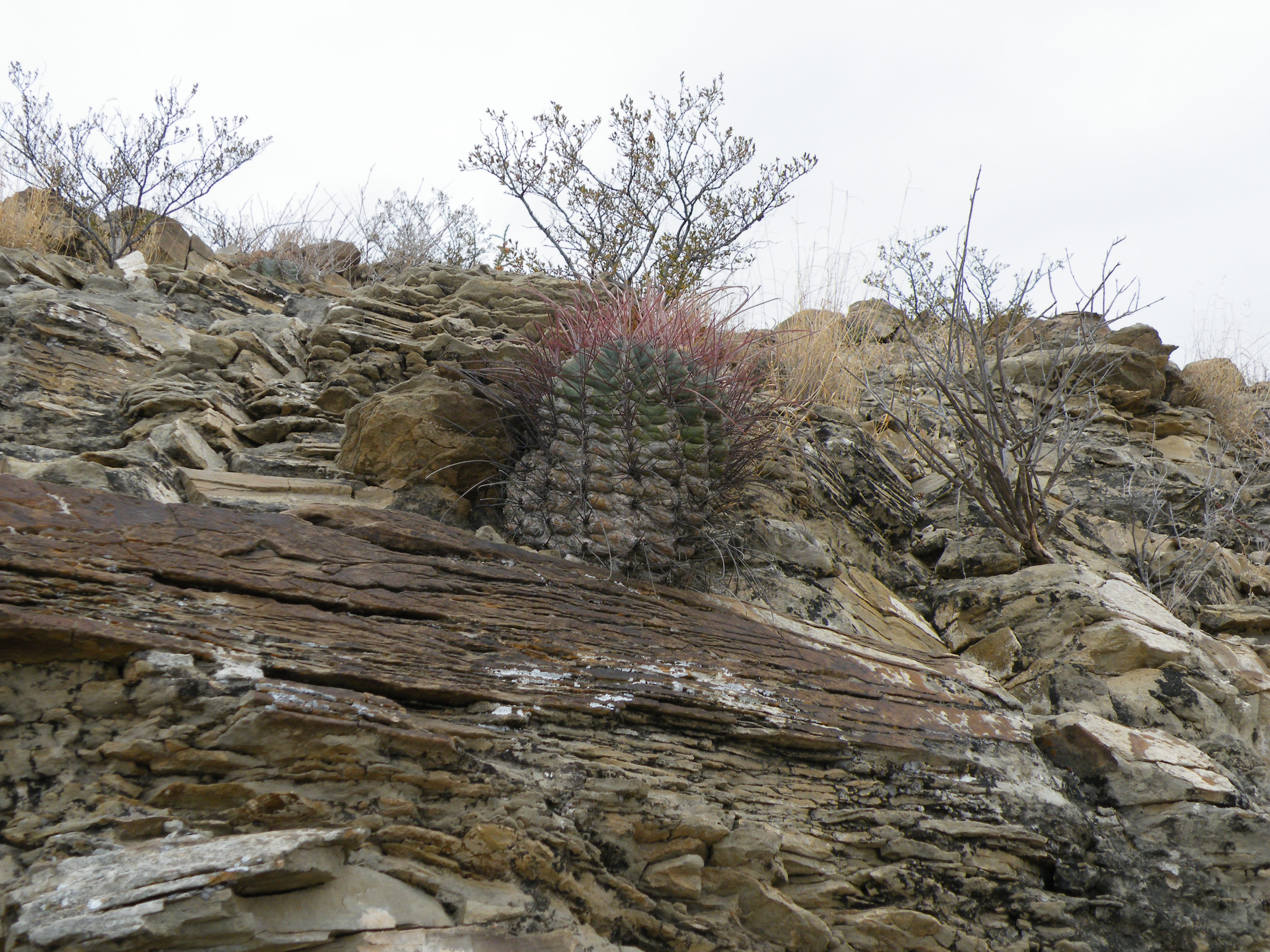
Habitat in Piedras Blancas, Coahuila

== Taxonomy ==
Philipp August Friedrich Mühlenpfordt first described Ferocactus hamatacanthus as Echinocactus hamatacanthus in 1846. The species name "hamatacanthus" comes from the Latin "hamatus," meaning "hook," and the Greek "akanthos," meaning "spines," referring to the hooked central spines of the plant. In 1922, Nathaniel Lord Britton and Joseph Nelson Rose reclassified the species into the genus Ferocactus.

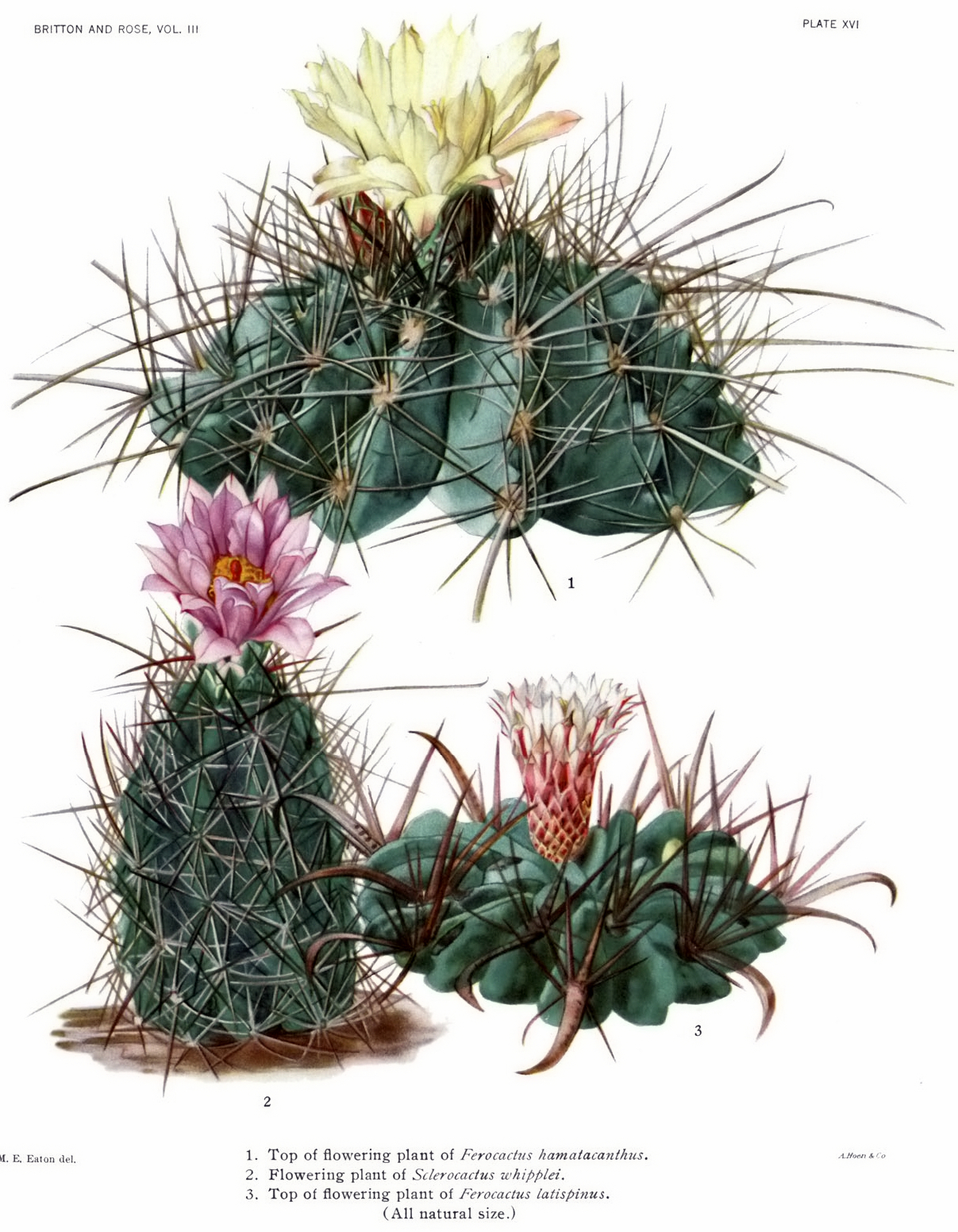
Plate from The Cactaceae Vol III, plate XVI
