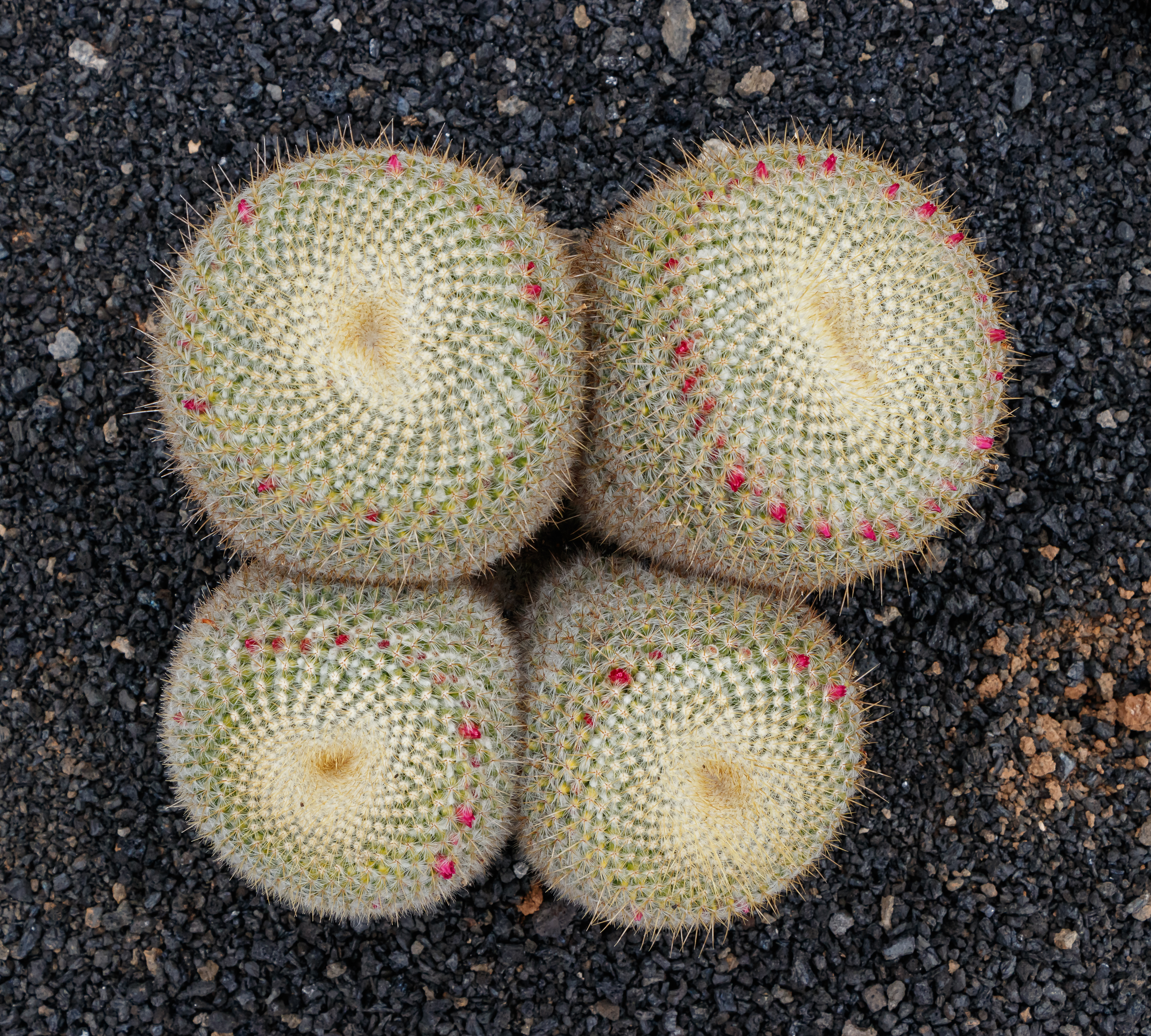

Conservation status
- Least Concern (IUCN 3.1)

Scientific classification
- Kingdom: Plantae
- Clade: Tracheophytes
- Clade: Angiosperms
- Clade: Eudicots
- Order: Caryophyllales
- Family: Cactaceae
- Subfamily: Cactoideae
- Genus: Mammillaria
- Species: M. muehlenpfordtii

Binomial name
- Mammillaria muehlenpfordtii C.F.Först., 1847

Synonyms
- List: Cactus muehlenpfordtii (C.F.Först.) Kuntze 1891; Neomammillaria muehlenpfordtii (C.F.Först.) Y.Itô i1981; Cactus celsianus (Lem.) Kuntze 1891; Cactus lanifer (Haw.) Kuntze 1891; Cactus polycephalus (Muehlenpf.) Kuntze 1891; Cactus schaeferi (Fennel) Kuntze 1891; Mammillaria celsiana Lem. 1839; Mammillaria lanifera Haw. 1824; Mammillaria neopotosina R.T.Craig 1945; Mammillaria neopotosina var. brevispina R.T.Craig 1945; Mammillaria neopotosina var. hexispina F.Schmoll ex R.T.Craig 1945; Mammillaria neopotosina var. longispina R.T.Craig 1945; Mammillaria perringii Hildm. ex K.Schum. 1898; Mammillaria polycephala Muehlenpf. 1845; Mammillaria schaeferi Fennel 1847; Mammillaria schaeferi var. longispina J.N.Haage 1861; Neomammillaria celsiana (Lem.) Britton & Rose 1923; Neomammillaria muehlenpfordtii var. brevispina (R.T.Craig) Y.Itô 1981; Neomammillaria muehlenpfordtii var. hexispina (F.Schmoll ex R.T.Craig) Y.Itô 1981) publ; Neomammillaria muehlenpfordtii var. longispina (R.T.Craig) Y.Itô 1981

= Mammillaria muehlenpfordtii =

Species of cactus

Mammillaria muehlenpfordtii is a species of cactus in the subfamily Cactoideae.

== Description ==
Mammillaria muehlenpfordtii is a succulent plant that grows rapidly and forms large clusters. It has gray-green cone-shaped warts covered in drooping bristles and features 30–50 white to whitish-yellow marginal spines, each 4 mm long, crowned with 2 to 6 upright central spines. These central spines vary in color from yellowish to brown and gray, ranging from 2 to 40 mm in length. The plant produces carmine red flowers in a wreath-like arrangement, each reaching a size of 1.5 cm in diameter. Its long fruits are bright red, and its seeds are brown.

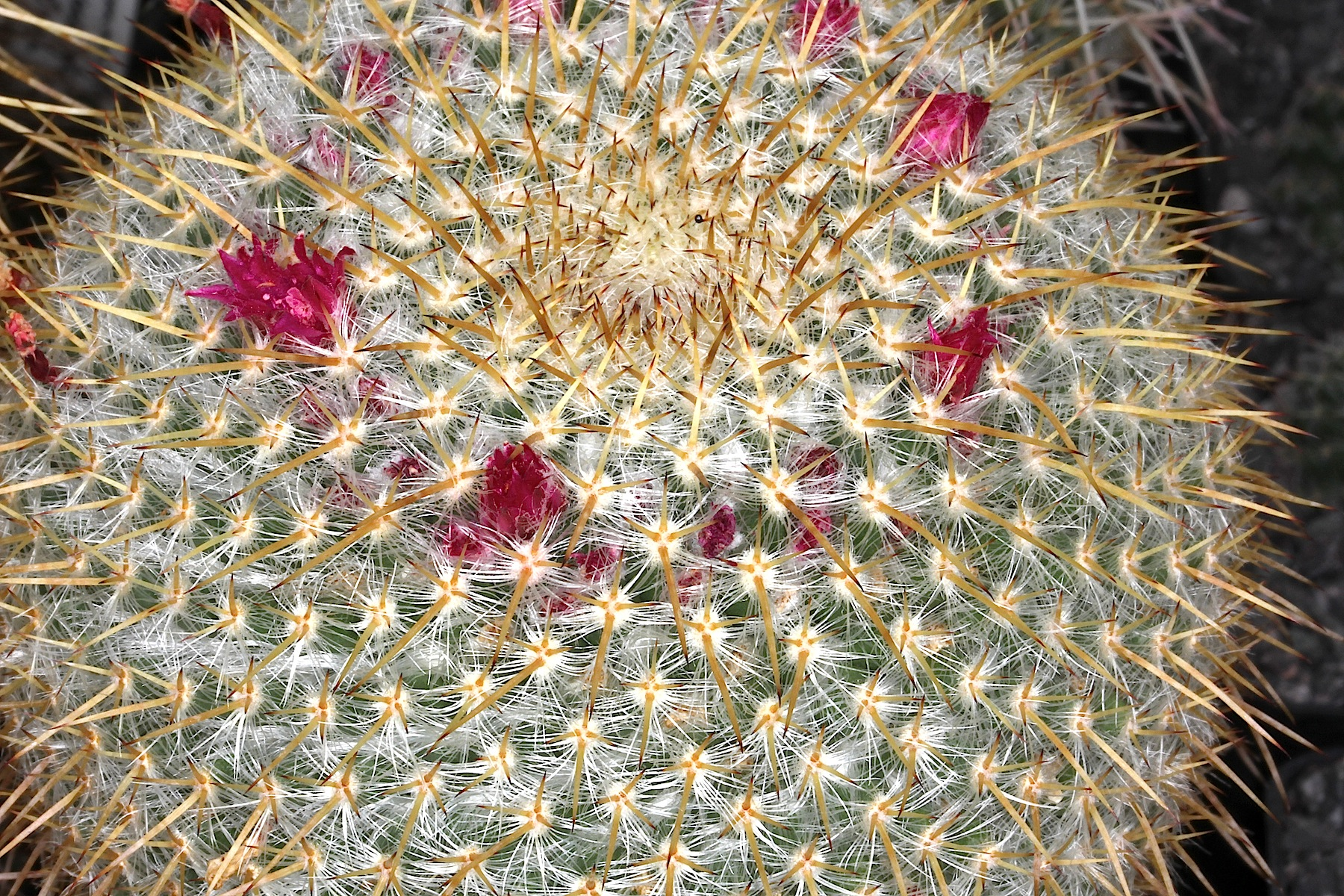
Flowers

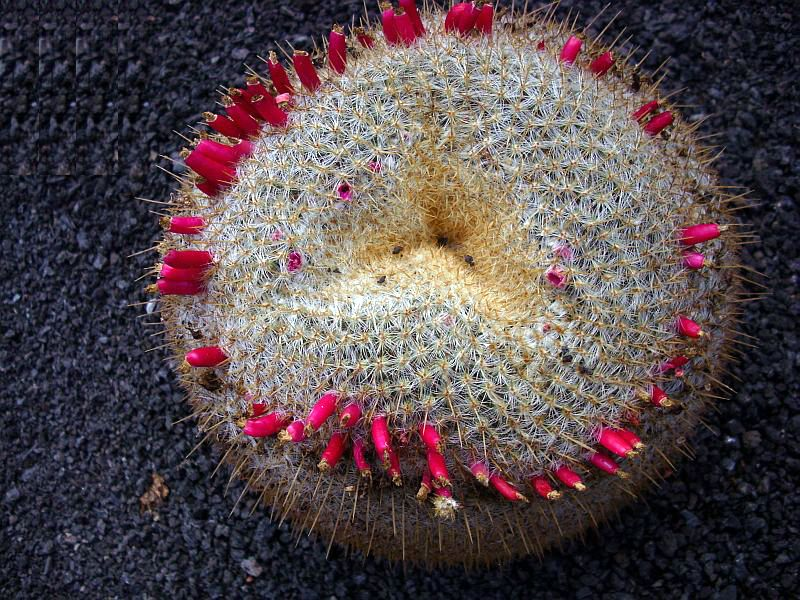
Fruits

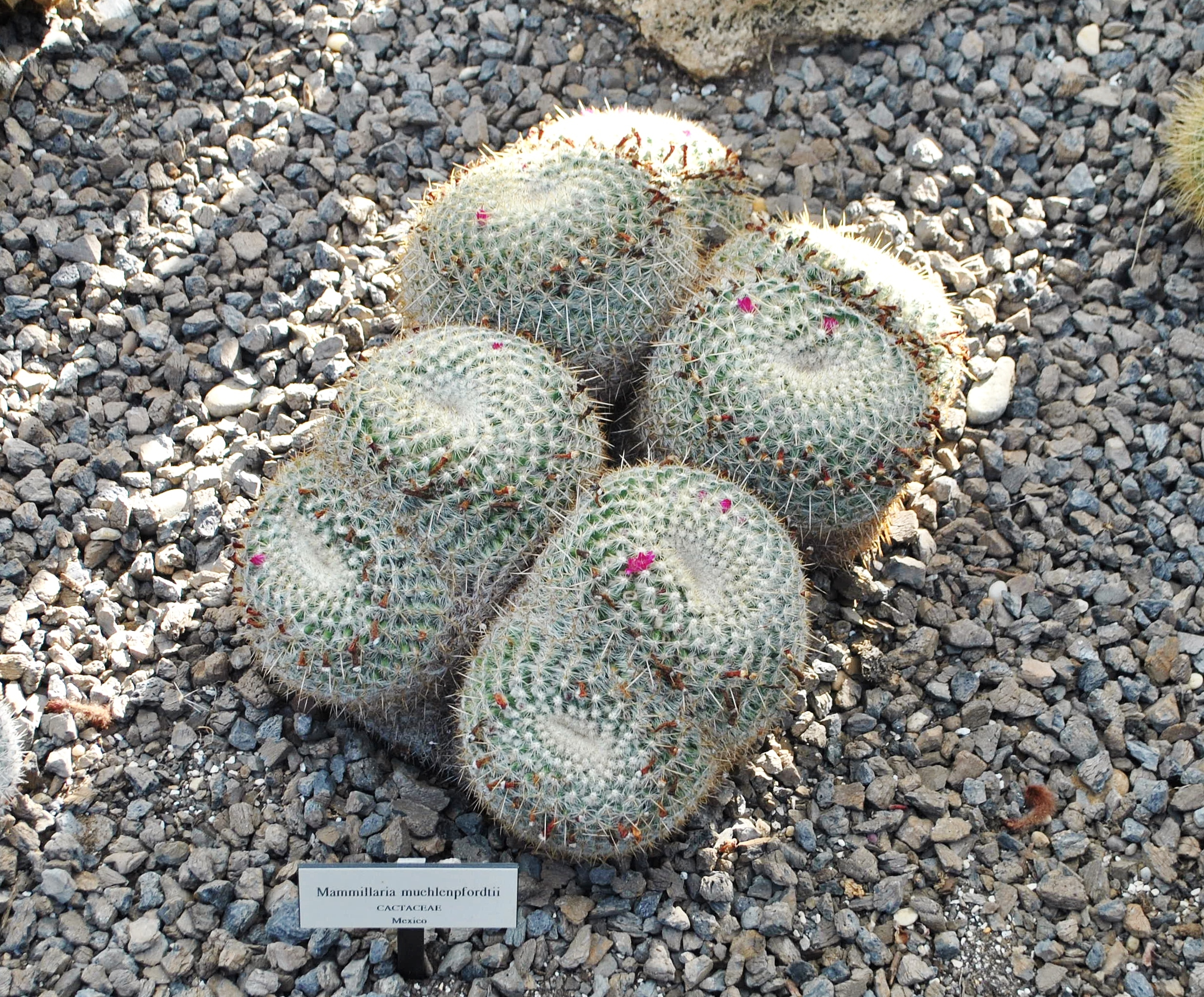
Plants growing in clumps

== Distribution ==
The plant is native to the Mexican states of Guanajuato, Querétaro, and San Luis Potosí, Mammillaria muehlenpfordtii grows at elevations of 1700 to 2400 meters.

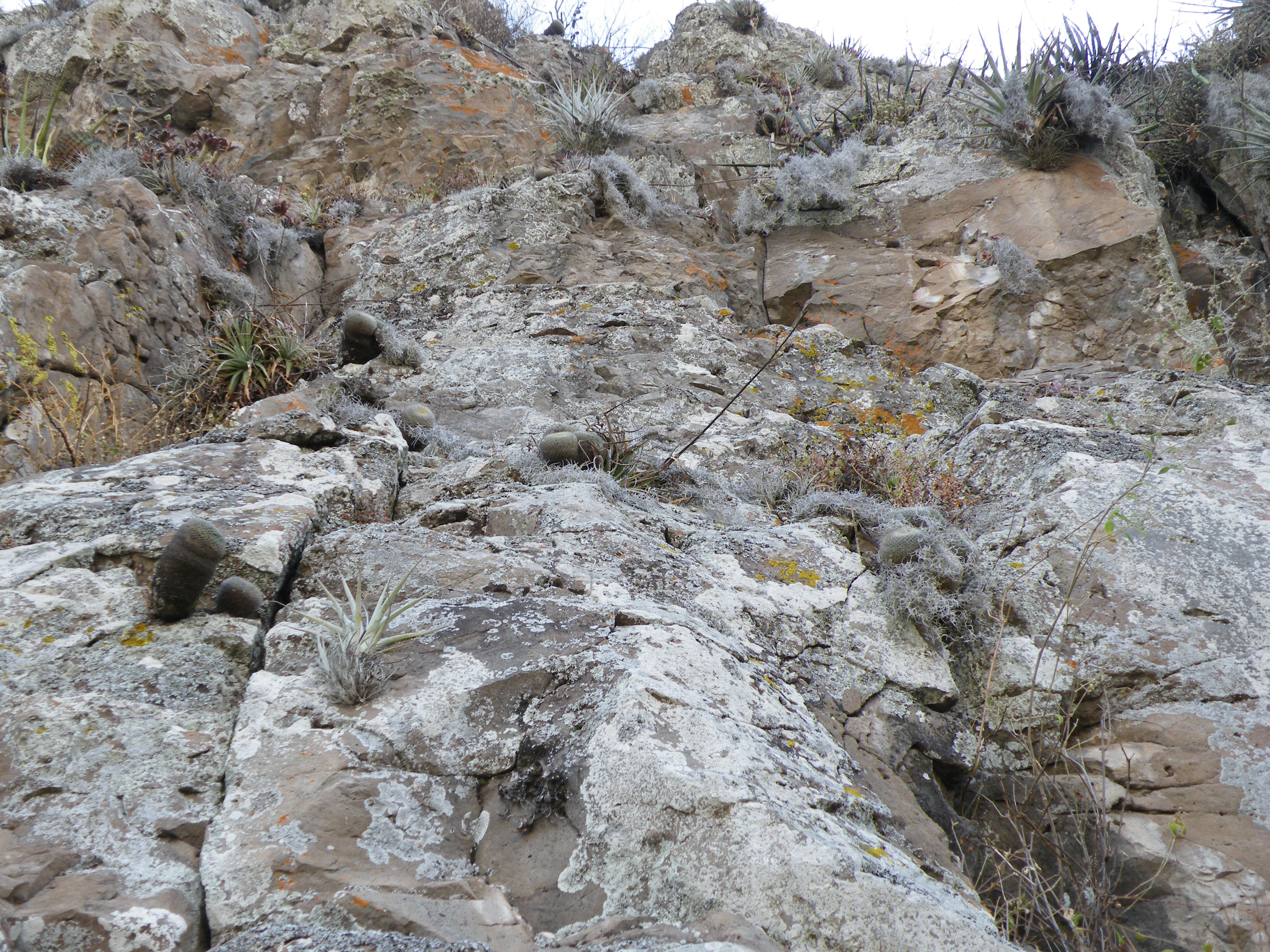
Plant growing habitat in San Luis de la Paz, Mexico

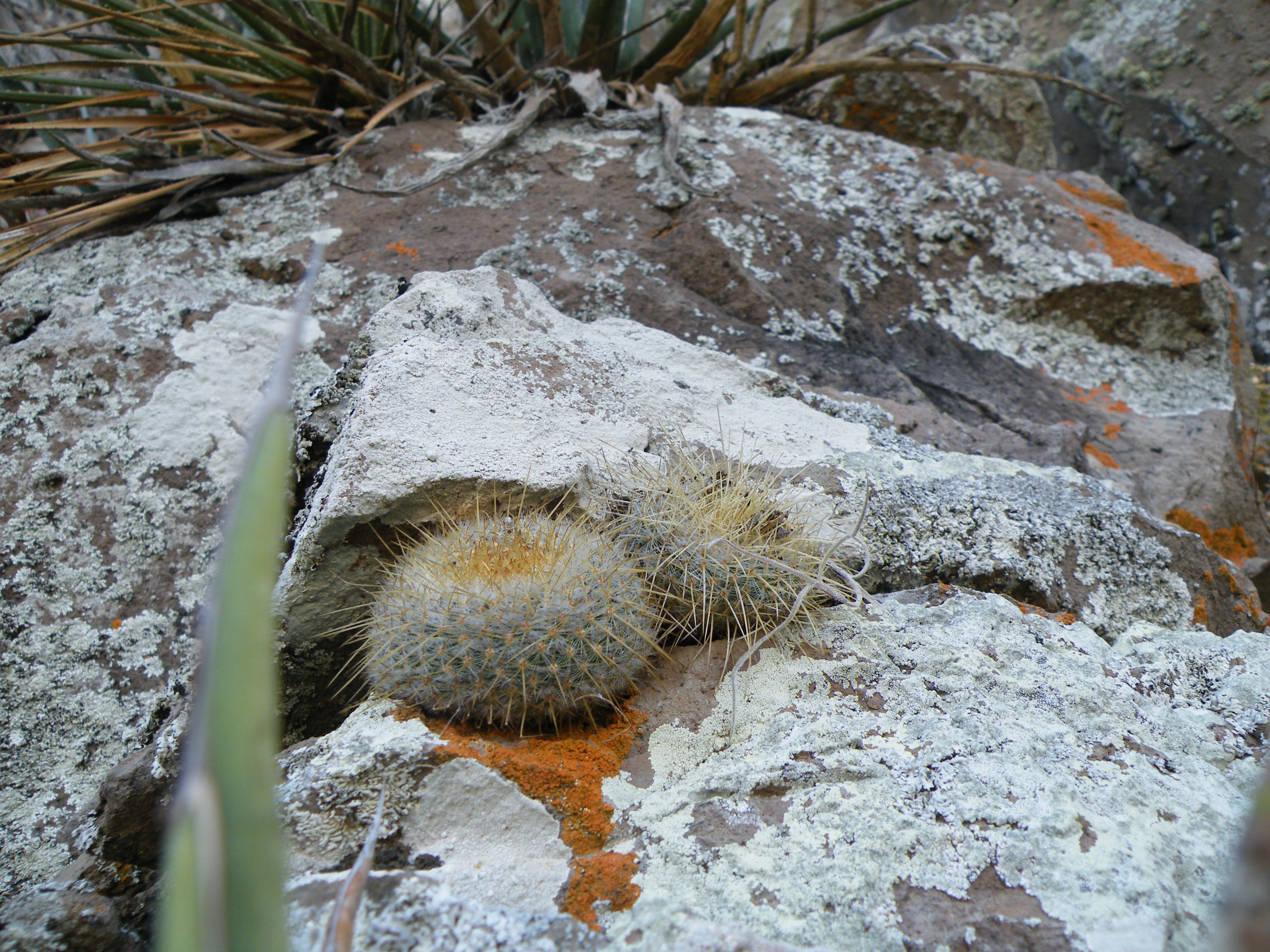
Plant growing habitat in between crevices in San Luis de la Paz

== Taxonomy ==
Mammillaria muehlenpfordtii was first described in 1847 by Carl Friedrich Förster, the plant's specific epithet, muehlenpfordtii, honors the German physician and botanist Philipp August Friedrich Mühlenpfordt from Hanover. Nomenclature synonyms include Cactus muehlenpfordtii (C.F.Först.) Kuntze (1891) and Neomammillaria muehlenpfordtii (C.F.Först.) Y.Itô (1981).
