= Philipp August Friedrich Mühlenpfordt =

German botanist (1803–1891)

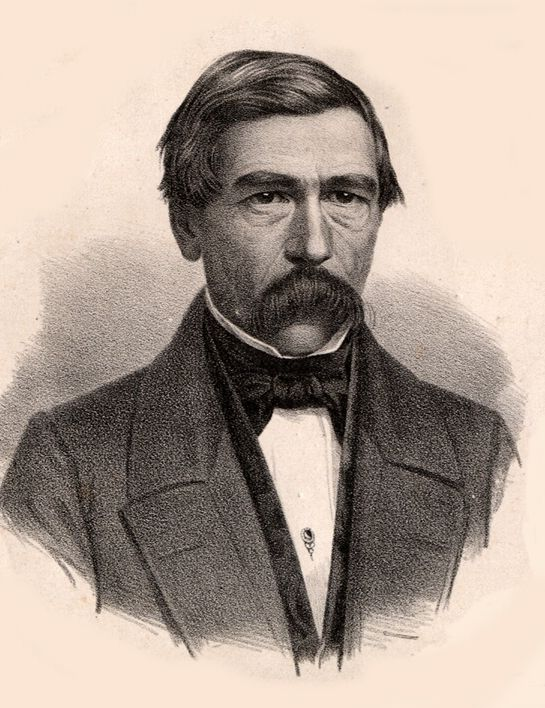
Friedrich Mühlenpfordt (1856)

Philipp August Friedrich Mühlenpfordt (30 January 1803, Göttingen – 1891) was a German botanist.

From 1819 he worked at "Hagenmarkt-Apotheke" (pharmacy) in Braunschweig, later studying medicine and sciences at the University of Göttingen. In 1826 he earned his medical doctorate, subsequently serving as a general practitioner in Göttingen. In 1831 he was appointed professor of zoology and botany by Karl Karmarsch (1803–1879) at the newly established Höhere Gewerbeschule in Hanover (today known as the Leibniz University Hannover). Here he taught classes until 1868.

He is known for his investigations of cacti, and the species Mammillaria muehlenpfordtii is named in his honour.
