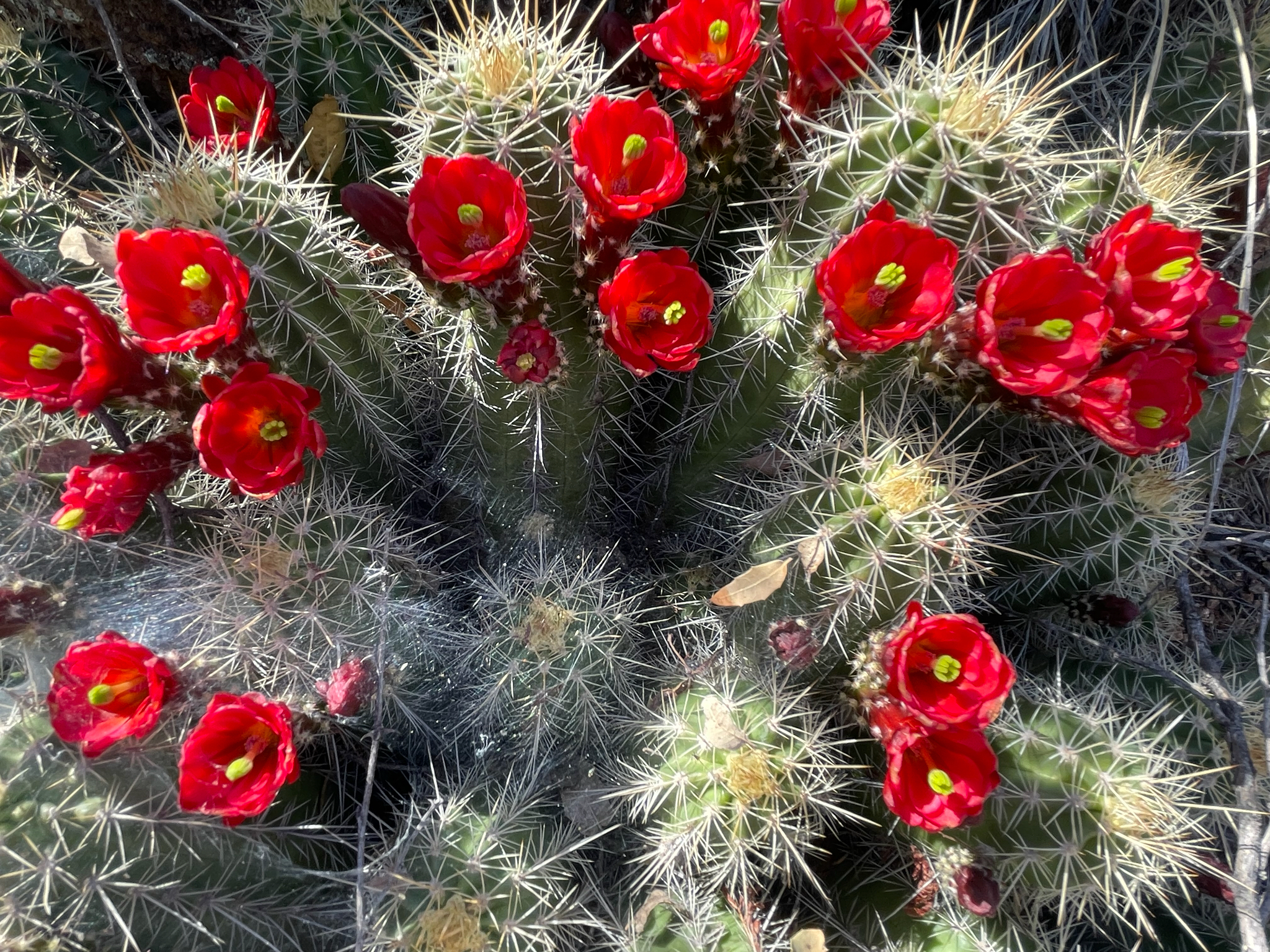

Scientific classification
- Kingdom: Plantae
- Clade: Tracheophytes
- Clade: Angiosperms
- Clade: Eudicots
- Order: Caryophyllales
- Family: Cactaceae
- Subfamily: Cactoideae
- Genus: Echinocereus
- Species: E. bakeri

Binomial name
- Echinocereus bakeri W.Blum, Oldach & J.Oldach 2015

= Echinocereus bakeri =

Species of cactus

Echinocereus bakeri, commonly known as Baker kingcup cactus, is a species of cactus native to the Southwestern United States.

== Description ==
The usually branched plant forms small clumps consisting of many stems. The dark green plant body is ovate to cylindrical and reaches heights of up to 13–30 cm (5.1–11.8 in) with a diameter of 4 to 5 cm (1.6 to 2.0 in). The 9 to 11 ribs often form warts. The spines are yellow brown becoming grey. The areoles have 1-4 central spines, have an angular cross section and are up to 2–4.5 cm (0.79–1.77 in) long and 7-11 radial spines that are 0.5–3 cm (0.20–1.18 in) long. The broad, funnel-shaped, dioecious, red flowers appear below the shoot tip. They are 5 to 7 cm (2.0 to 2.8 in) long and have a diameter of 3.5 to 4.5 cm (1.4 to 1.8 in). After blooms, it has edible oval fruits turn purple brown 1.5–2 cm (0.59–0.79 in) in diameter and 2–3 cm (0.79–1.18 in) long with white pulp and black seeds.

== Distribution ==
Plants are found growing in gravel soil in grasslands along with bushes and Pinyon-Juniper woodlands in Nevada, Arizona and Washington County, Utah at elevations of 500–2,450 m (1,640–8,040 ft).

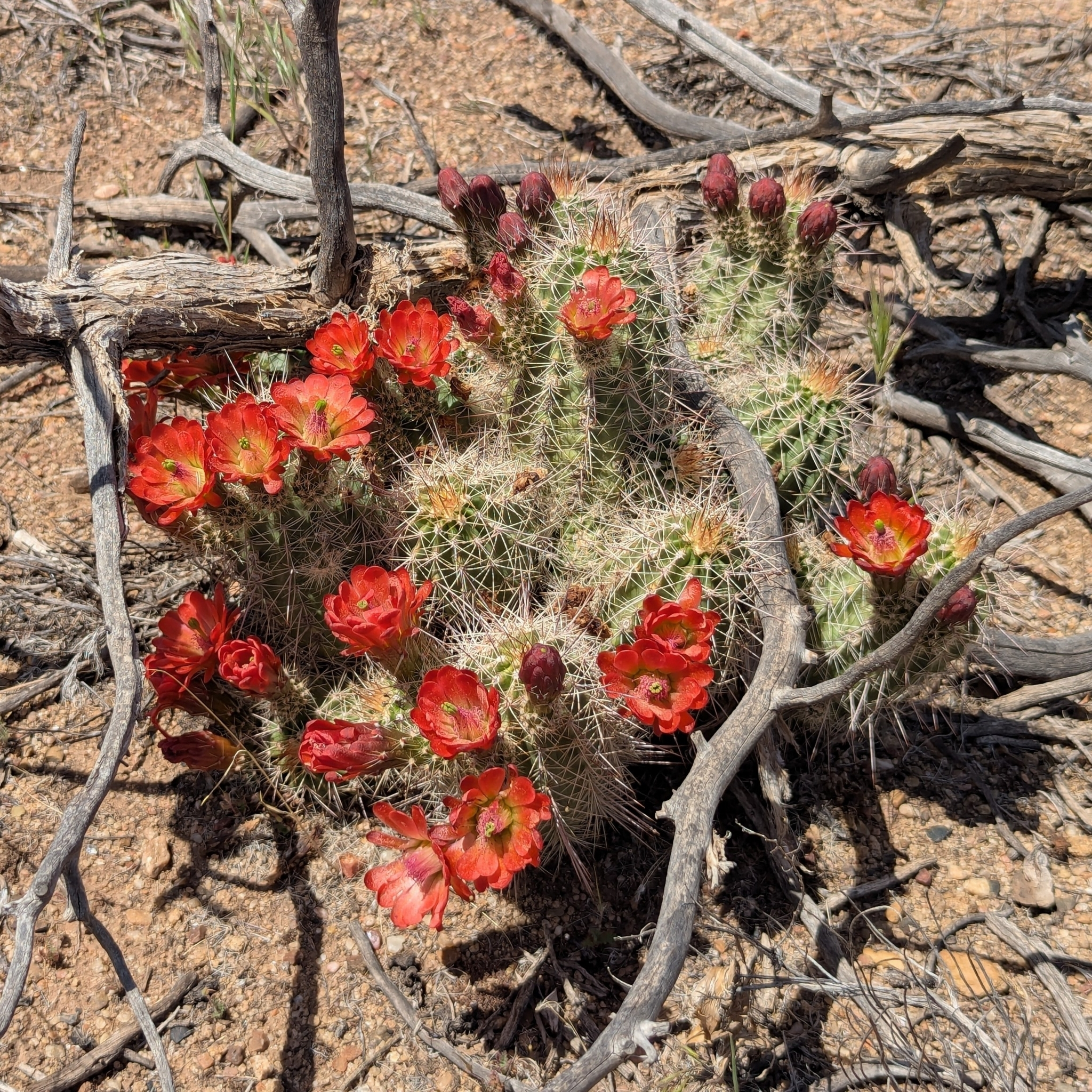
Habitat in Washington County, Utah

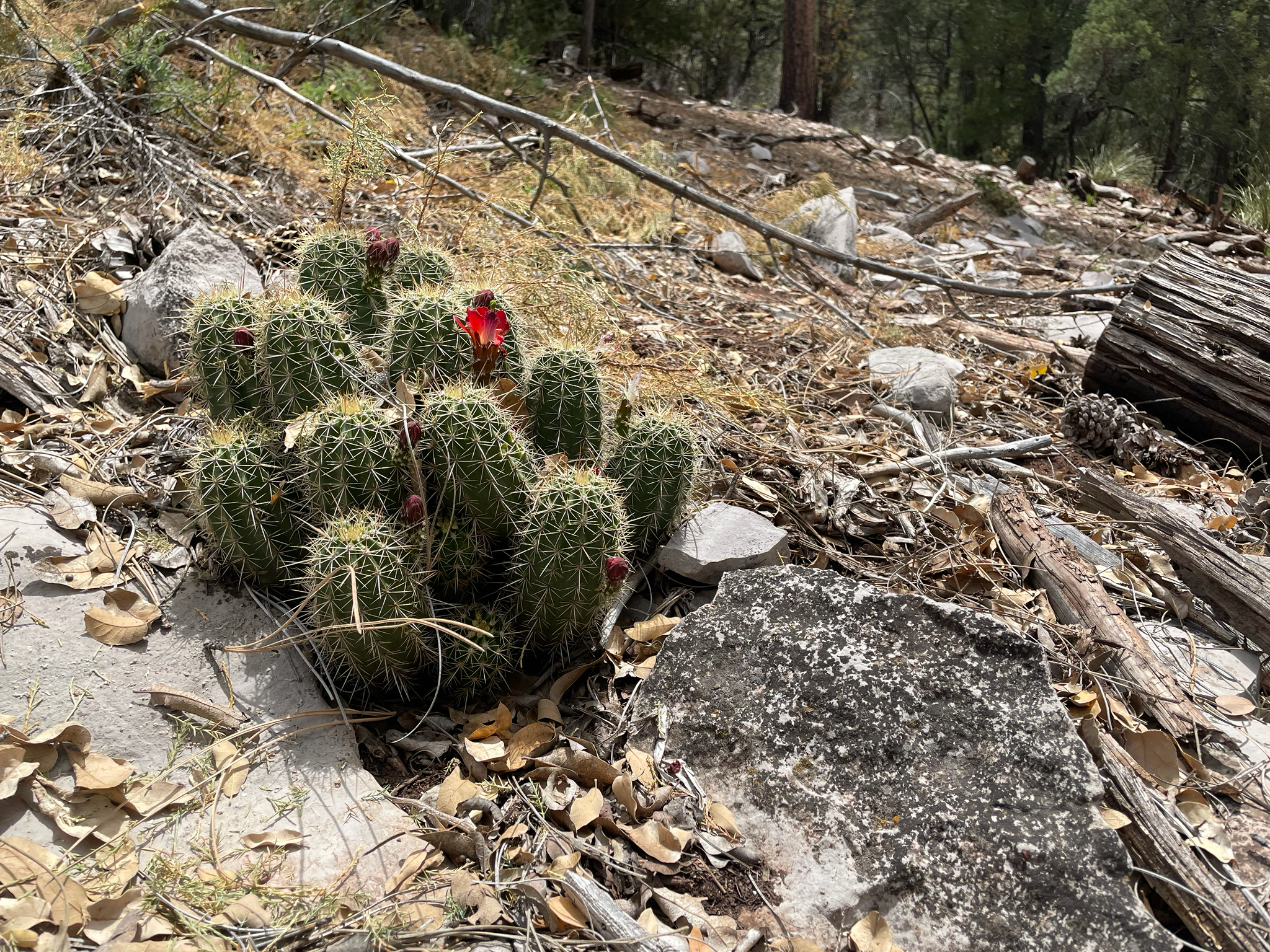
Habitat in Gila County, Arizona

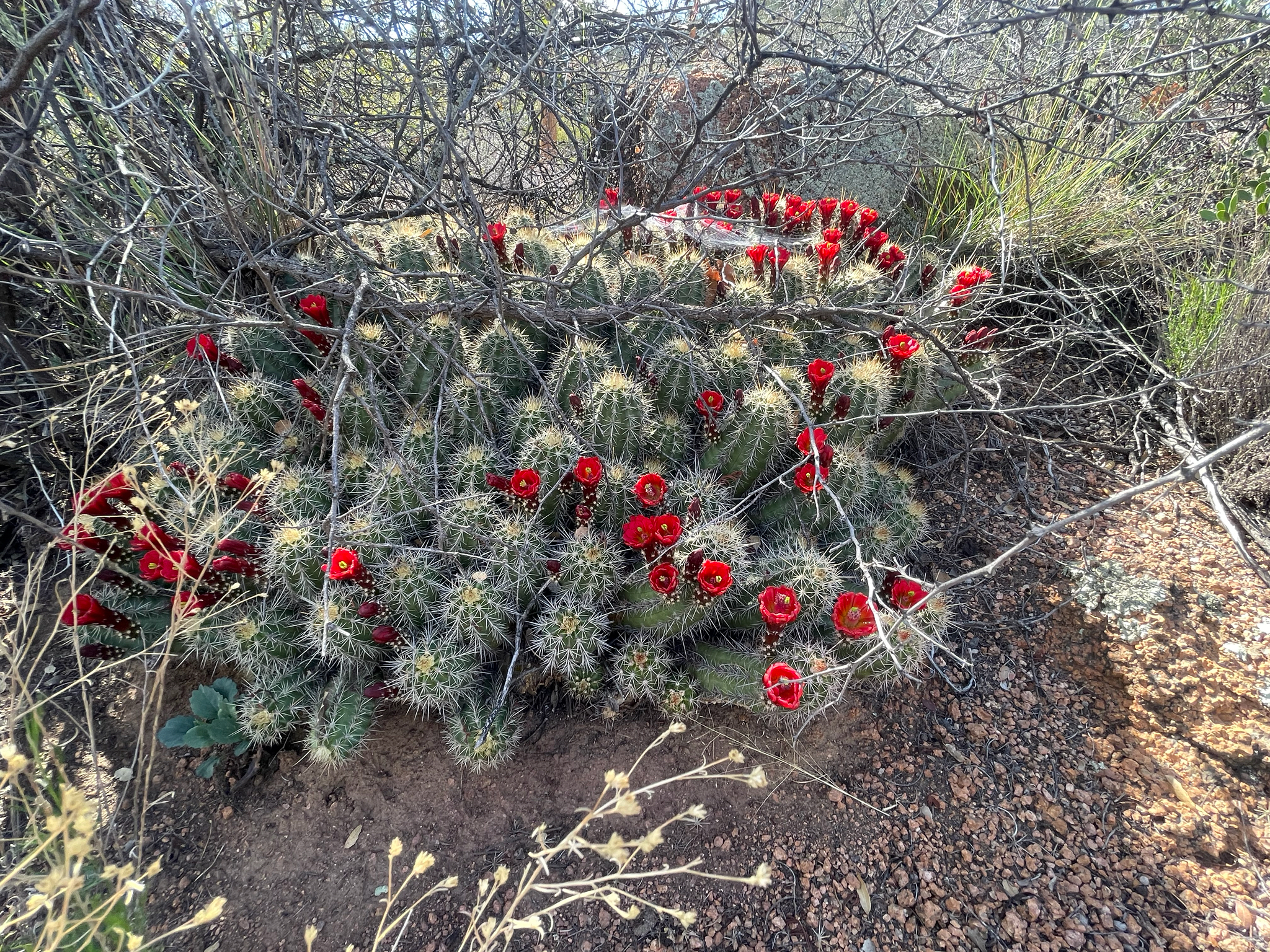
Habitat in Payson, Arizona

== Taxonomy ==
Echinocereus bakeri was first collected in Yavapai County, Arizona in 2001 by Marc A. Baker. The species was later described in 2015 by Wolfgang Blum, Traute and Jorn Oldach who named it after its discoverer.
