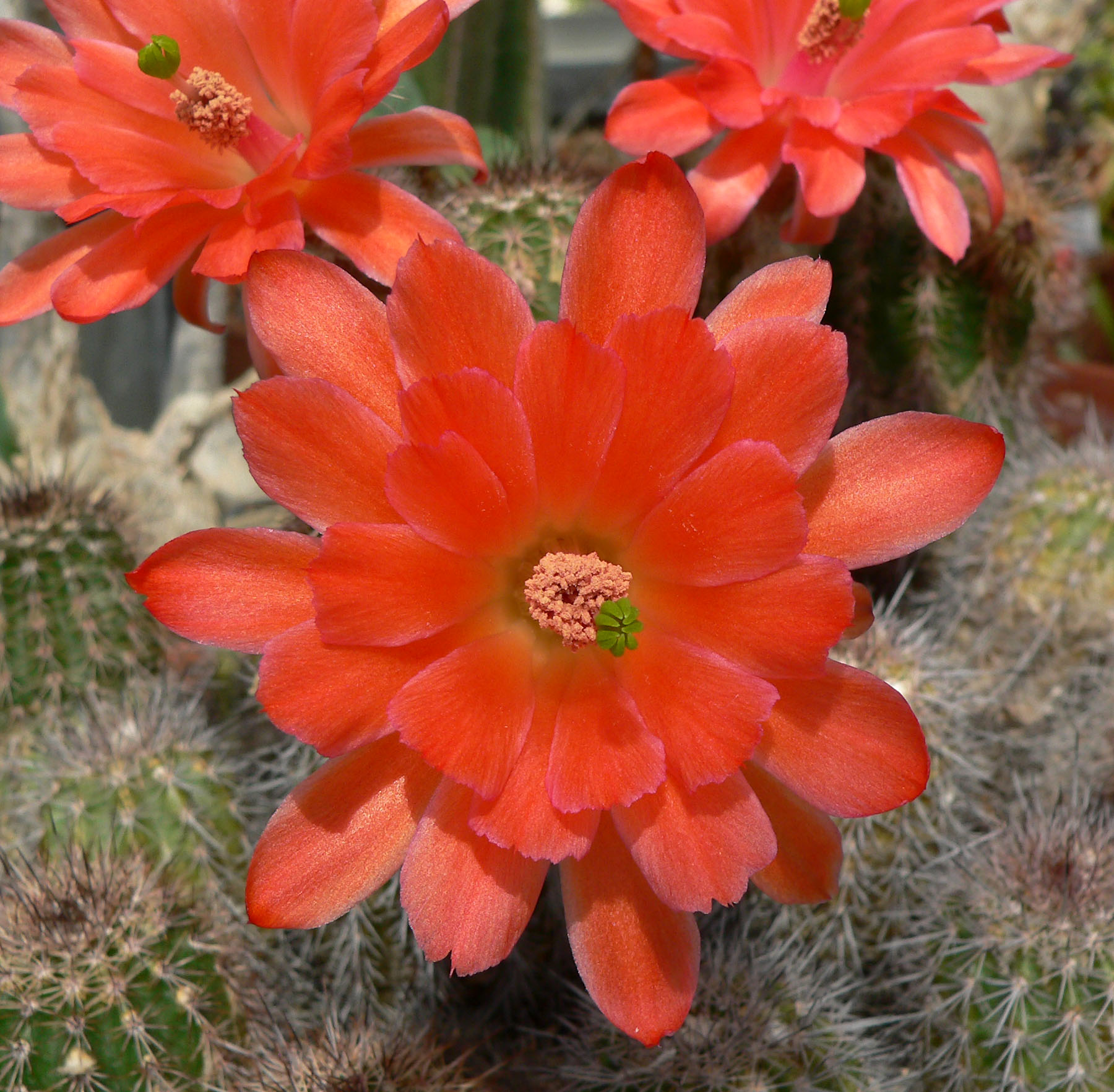

Scientific classification
- Kingdom: Plantae
- Clade: Tracheophytes
- Clade: Angiosperms
- Clade: Eudicots
- Order: Caryophyllales
- Family: Cactaceae
- Subfamily: Cactoideae
- Genus: Echinocereus
- Species: E. huitcholensis

Binomial name
- Echinocereus huitcholensis (F.A.C.Weber) M.Gürke 1906

Synonyms
- Cereus huitcholensis F.A.C.Weber 1904; Echinocereus acifer subsp. huitcholensis (F.A.C.Weber) Mich.Lange 1994; Echinocereus polyacanthus subsp. huitcholensis (F.A.C.Weber) N.P.Taylor 1997; Echinocereus polyacanthus var. huitcholensis (F.A.C.Weber) N.P.Taylor 1988; Echinocereus triglochidiatus subsp. huitcholensis (F.A.C.Weber) U.Guzmán 2003; Echinocereus acifer subsp. topiensis (W.Rischer & Trocha) W.Rischer 2004; Echinocereus matthesianus Backeb. 1963; Echinocereus topiensis W.Rischer & Trocha 1999

= Echinocereus huitcholensis =

Species of cactus

Echinocereus huitcholensis is a species of Echinocereus found in Mexico.
