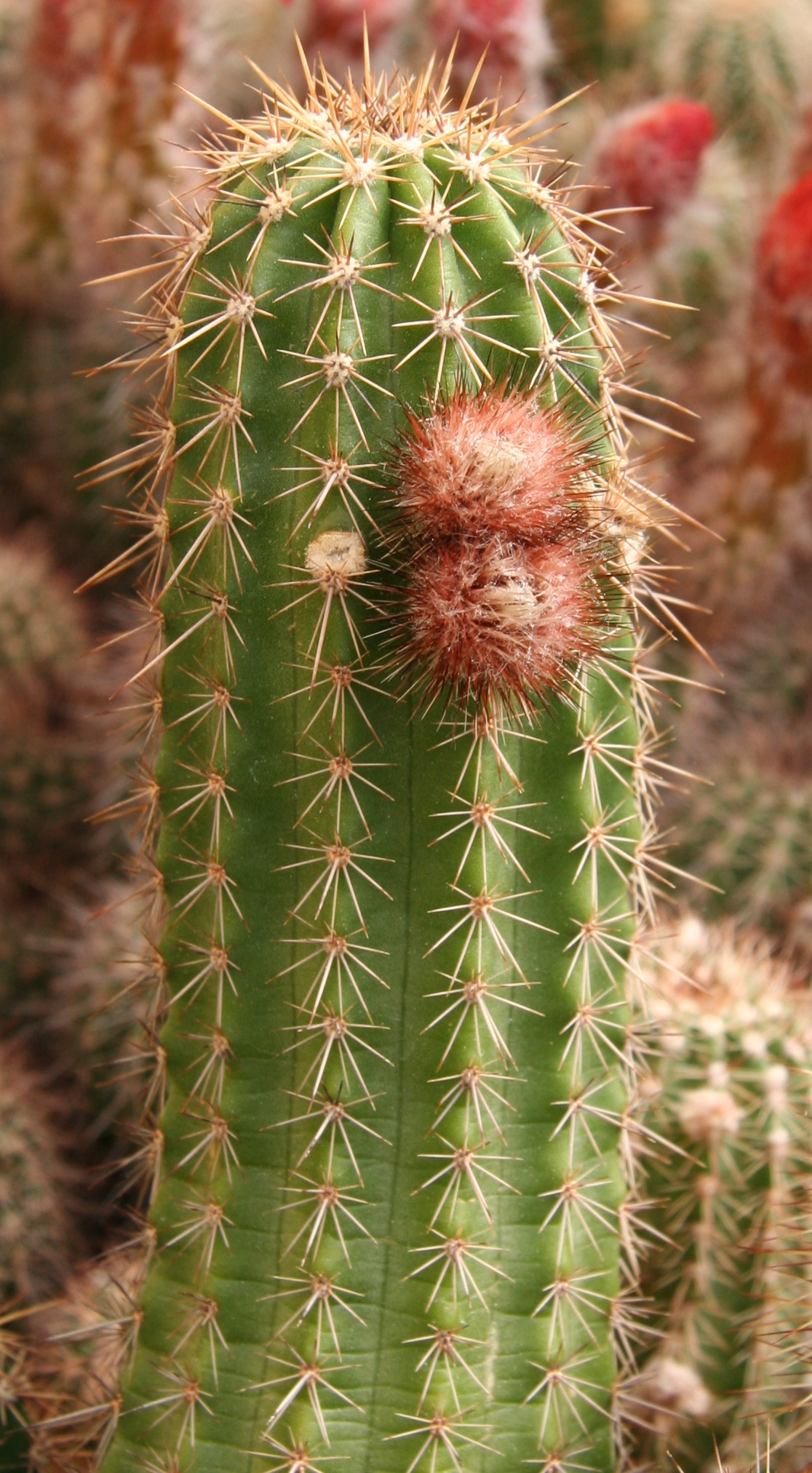

Conservation status
- Data Deficient (IUCN 3.1)

Scientific classification
- Kingdom: Plantae
- Clade: Tracheophytes
- Clade: Angiosperms
- Clade: Eudicots
- Order: Caryophyllales
- Family: Cactaceae
- Subfamily: Cactoideae
- Genus: Echinocereus
- Species: E. ortegae

Binomial name
- Echinocereus ortegae Rose 1929

= Echinocereus ortegae =

Species of cactus

Echinocereus ortegae is a species of cactus native to Mexico.

== Description ==
Echinocereus ortegae forms dense clusters up to 30 cm in diameter, composed of numerous dark green, cylindrical stems. These mostly upright stems are 10 to 40 cm long and 2.5 to 4 cm in diameter, with ten to sixteen tuberculate ribs. The whitish to brownish spines are needle-like or bristle-like. The three to six central spines are 0.9 to 2.2 cm long, and the ten to sixteen radial spines are up to 8 mm long. The bright scarlet flowers are tubular to funnel-shaped and slightly zygomorphic. They appear on the sides of the stems, measuring 6.5 to 10 cm long and 4.5 to 10 cm in diameter. The egg-shaped fruits are green with white flesh and lose their spines.

=== Subspecies ===
There are two recognized subspecies:

Image	Scientific name	Distribution
	Echinocereus ortegae subsp. koehresianus (G.Frank) W.Rischer & G.Frank	Mexico (Sonora, Sinaloa, Durango)
	Echinocereus ortegae subsp. ortegae	NW. Mexico

== Distribution ==
Echinocereus ortegae is native to the Mexican states of Sonora, Sinaloa, and Durango.

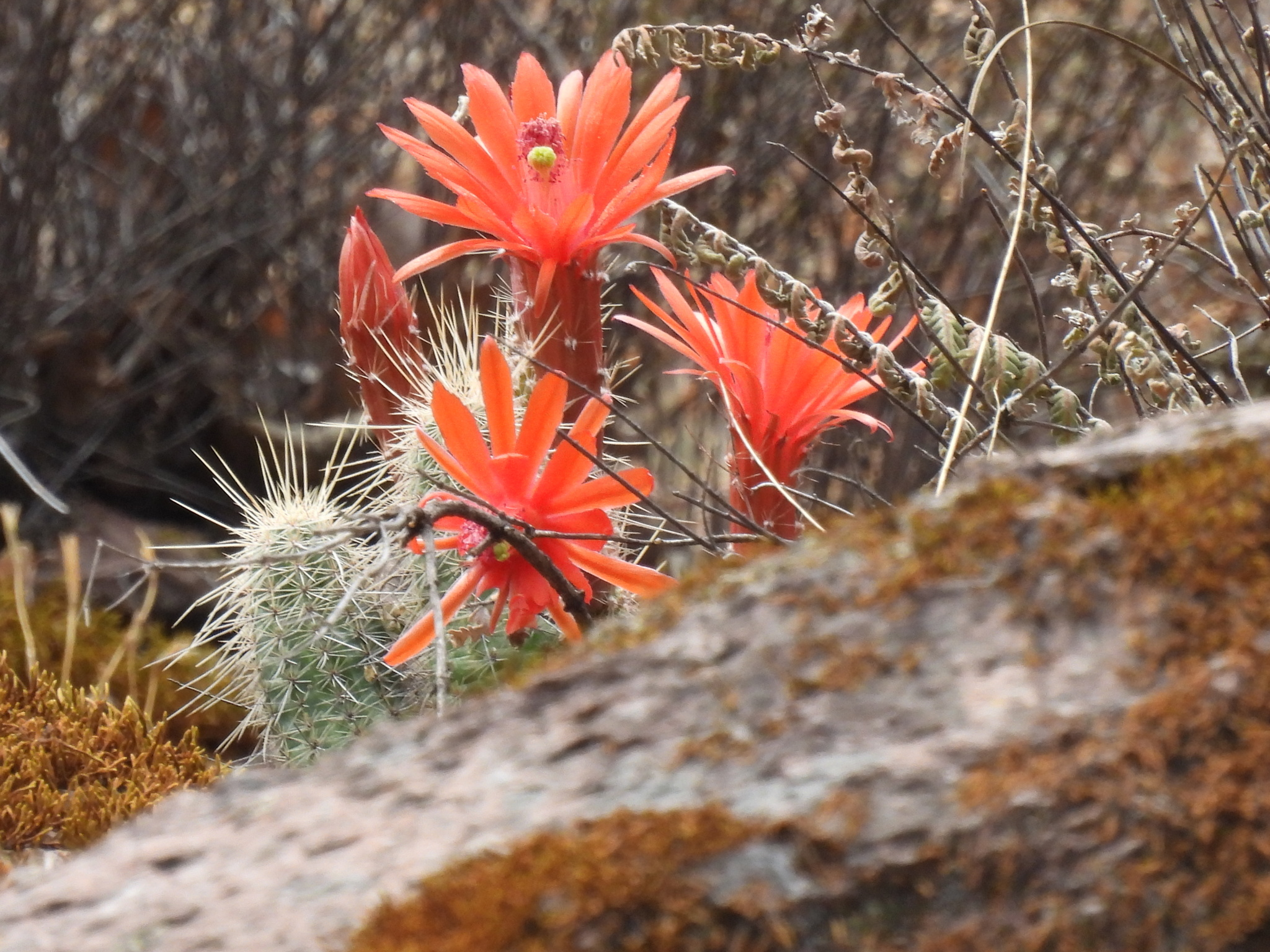
Habitat in Durango, Mexico

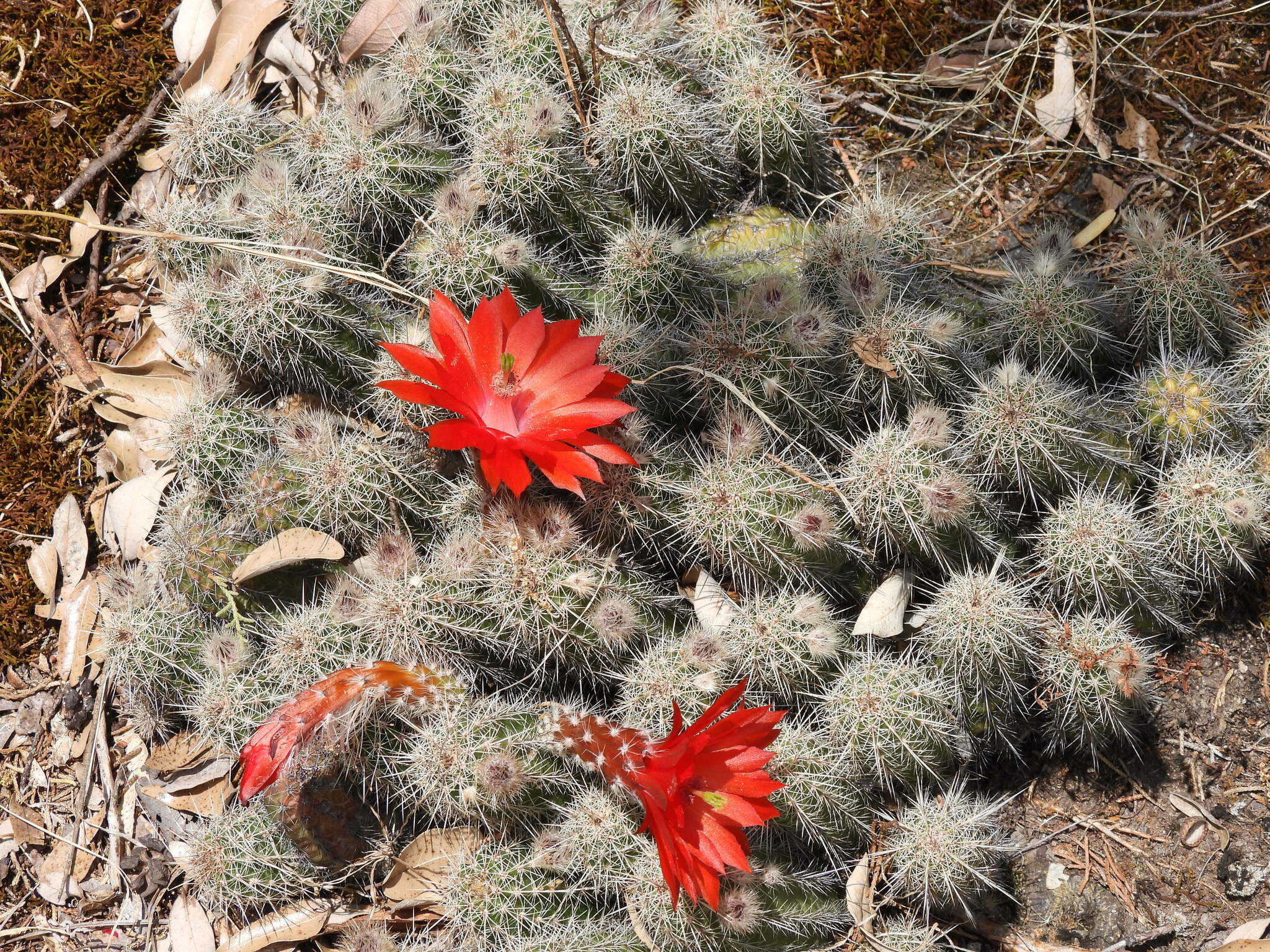
Plant growing in habitat in Sinaloa, Mexico

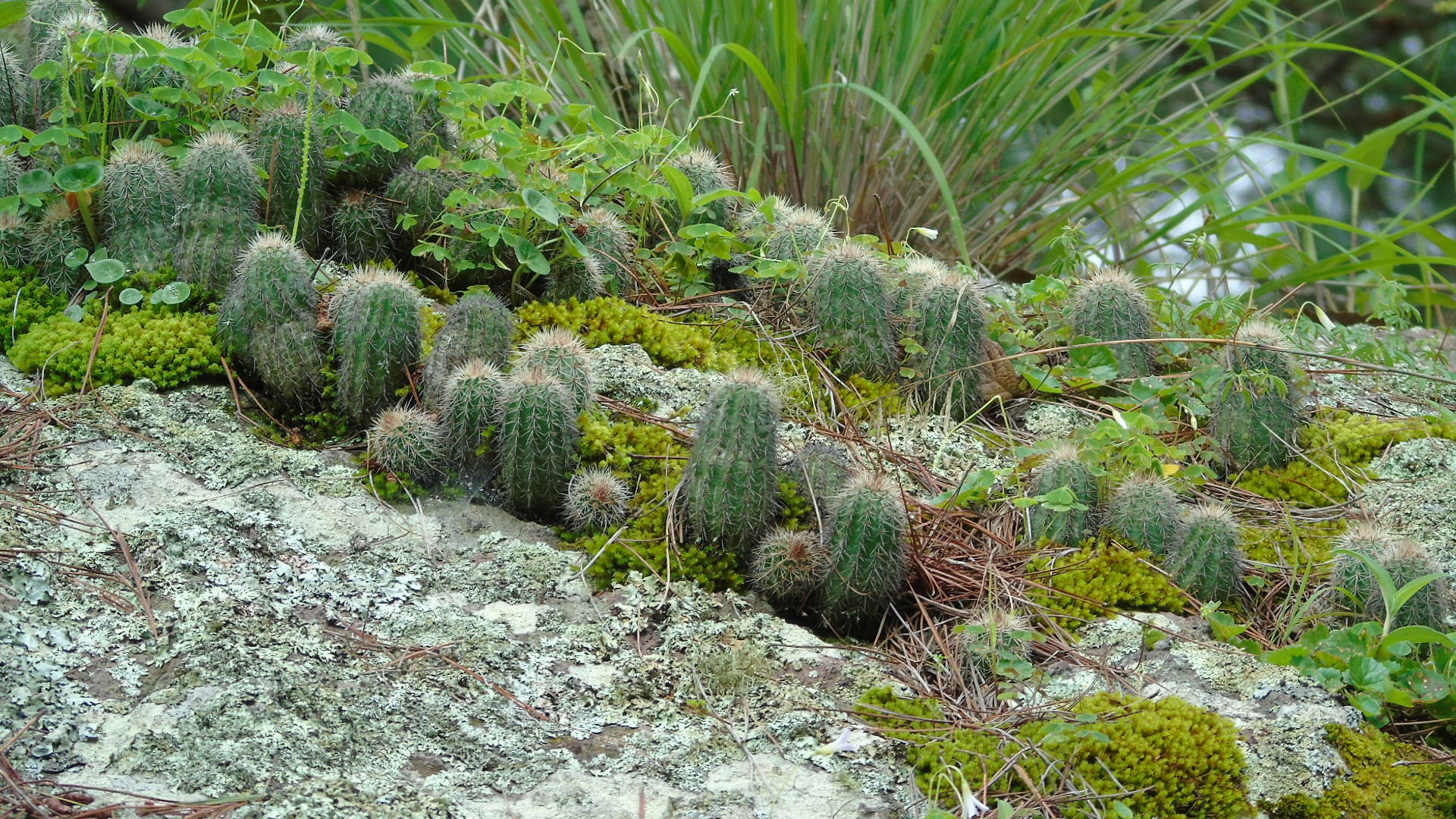
Habitat in Sinaloa, Mexico

== Taxonomy ==
The species was first described by Jesús González Ortega in 1929, with its name honoring the Mexican botanist.
