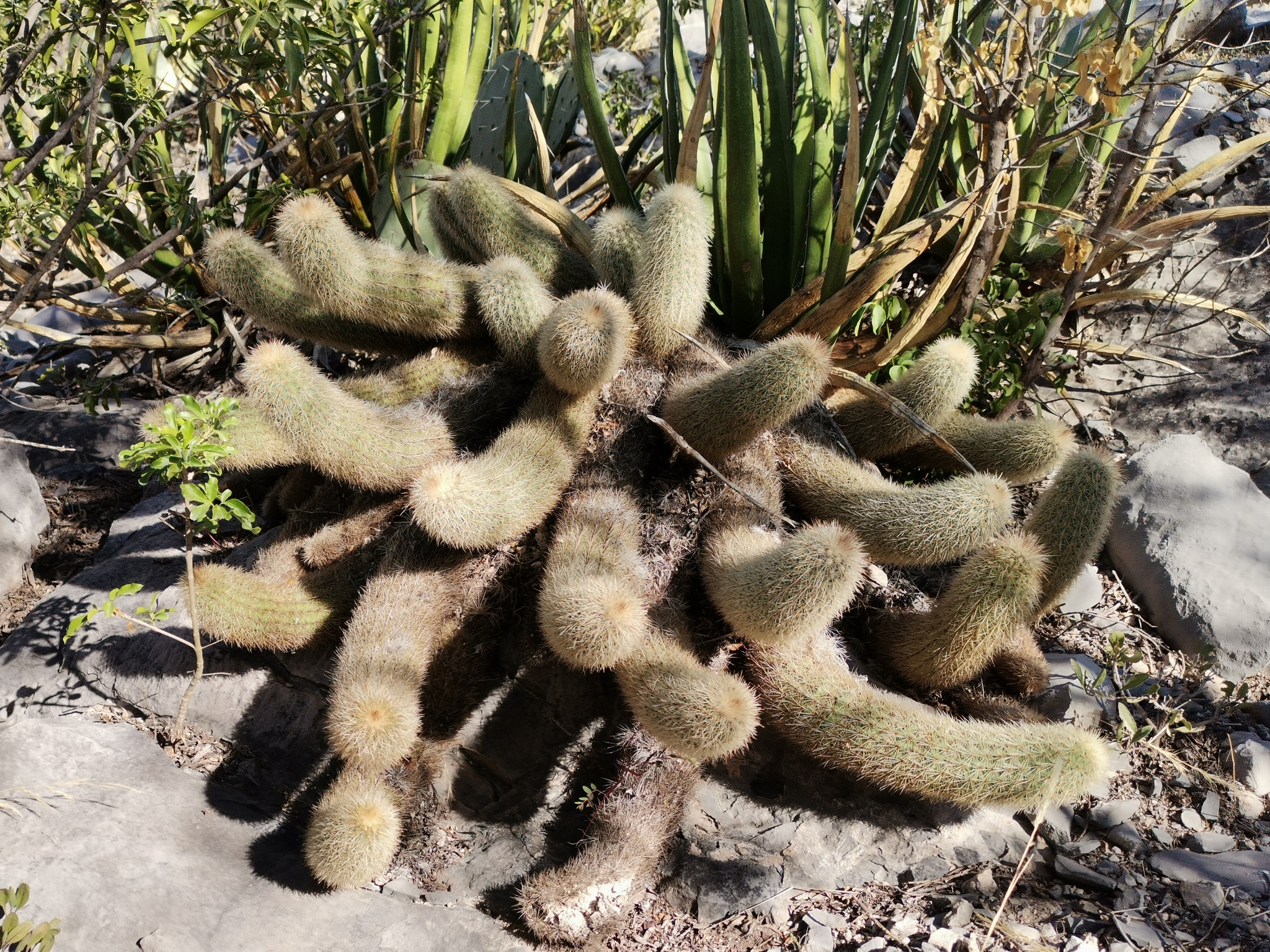

Scientific classification
- Kingdom: Plantae
- Clade: Tracheophytes
- Clade: Angiosperms
- Clade: Eudicots
- Order: Caryophyllales
- Family: Cactaceae
- Subfamily: Cactoideae
- Genus: Echinocereus
- Species: E. freudenbergeri

Binomial name
- Echinocereus freudenbergeri G.Frank

Synonyms
- Echinocereus delaetii var. freudenbergeri (G.Frank) N.P.Taylor 1985; Echinocereus longisetus subsp. freudenbergeri (G.Frank) W.Blum 1998

= Echinocereus freudenbergeri =

Species of cactus

Echinocereus freudenbergeri is a species of Echinocereus found in Mexico.

== Description ==
Echinocereus freudenbergi grows either solitary or in groups. Its cylindrical green stem is 15 cm (5.9 in) tall and 4 to 6 cm (1.6 to 2.4 in) in diameter, with 14 to 18 ribs. The plant has 20 to 25 grayish to brown spines, up to 2.5 cm (0.98 in) long, without distinction between central and radial spines. It produces pinkish-purple to magenta flowers, 6 to 12 cm (2.4 to 4.7 in) in diameter. The fruit is ovate, carmine red, 20 to 25 mm (0.79 to 0.98 in) long, and 15 to 20 mm (0.59 to 0.79 in) wide.

== Distribution ==
This cactus is found in the state of Coahuila, near Cuatro Ciénegas and Torreón, Mexico. It thrives in xeric thickets on rocky or limestone soils at elevations of 800 to 1000 meters above sea level.

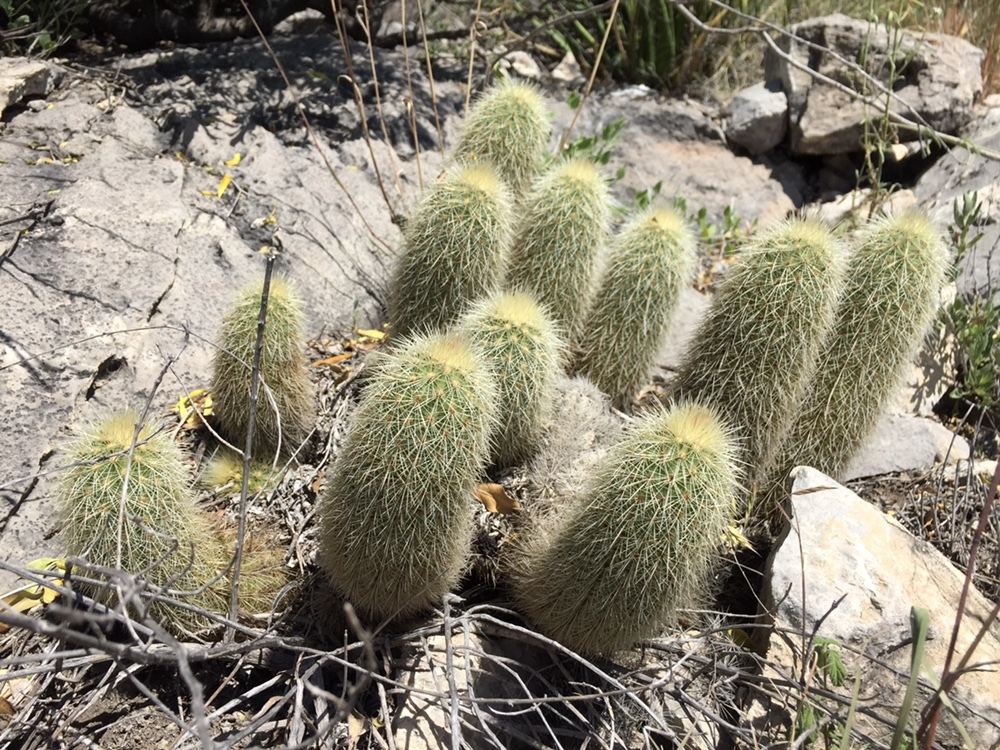

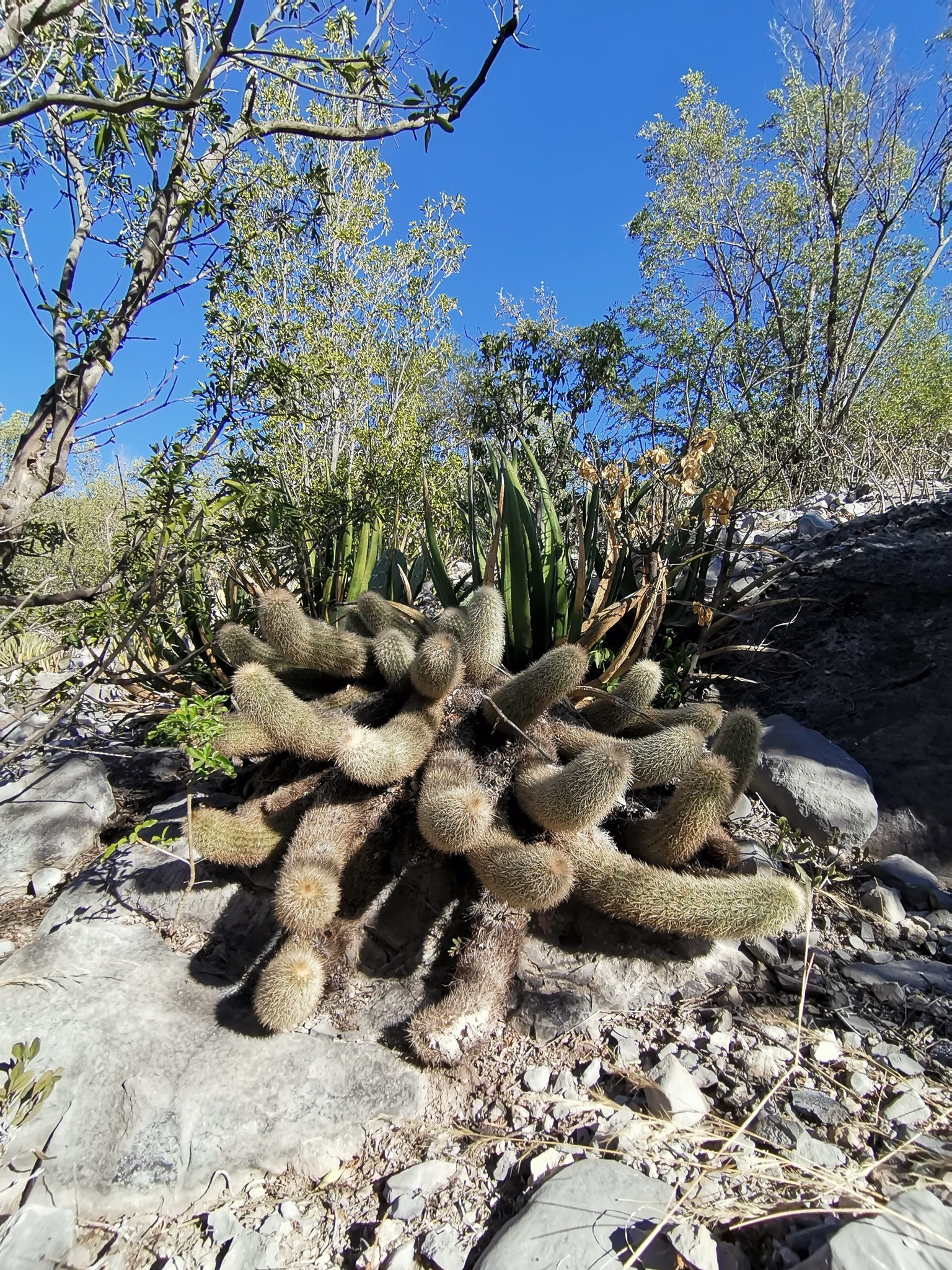

== Taxonomy ==
Echinocereus freudenbergi was first described by Gerhard R. W. Frank in 1981. The species epithet honors the German cactus collector Gerhard Freudenberger.
