= Echinocereus kroenleinii =

Conservation status
- Least Concern (IUCN 3.1)

Scientific classification
- Kingdom: Plantae
- Clade: Tracheophytes
- Clade: Angiosperms
- Clade: Eudicots
- Order: Caryophyllales
- Family: Cactaceae
- Subfamily: Cactoideae
- Genus: Echinocereus
- Species: E. kroenleinii

Binomial name
- Echinocereus kroenleinii (Mich.Lange) W.Blum & Waldeis 1999

Synonyms
- Echinocereus poselgeri subsp. kroenleinii Mich.Lange 1995; Wilcoxia kroenleinii A.Cartier 2000

Species of cactus

Echinocereus kroenleinii is a species of cactus native to Mexico.
