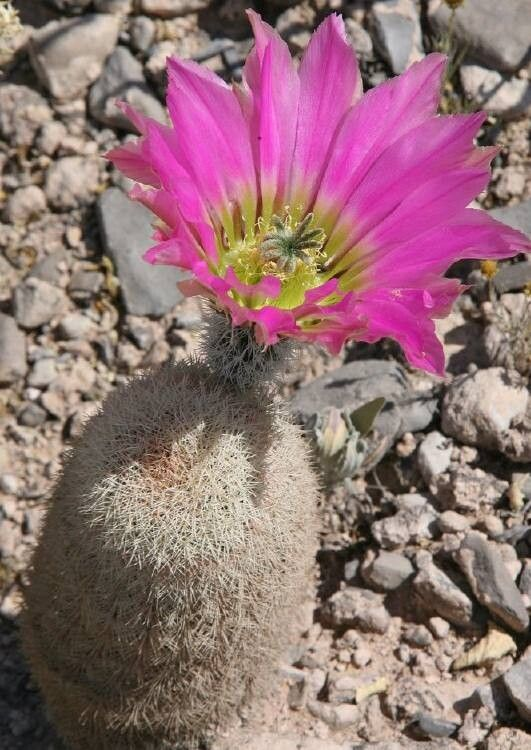

Scientific classification
- Kingdom: Plantae
- Clade: Tracheophytes
- Clade: Angiosperms
- Clade: Eudicots
- Order: Caryophyllales
- Family: Cactaceae
- Subfamily: Cactoideae
- Genus: Echinocereus
- Species: E. felixianus

Binomial name
- Echinocereus felixianus H.Bauer 2014

= Echinocereus felixianus =

Species of cactus

Echinocereus felixianus is a species of cactus native to Mexico.

== Description ==
Echinocereus felixianus grows solitary, cylindrical to elongated shoots with 19 to 23 ribs and a 5 to 9, strong, upright central spine that is white or light gray with a darker tip, measuring 6 to 7.5 mm (0.24 to 0.30 in) in length. Additionally, there are 20 to 27 spreading, straight, whitish or grayish radial spines that are 1.2 to 2 cm (0.47 to 0.79 in) long. The flowers of Echinocereus felixianus are cup-shaped and range from pink to magenta with a white band at the base. They appear in the upper half of the shoots. The spherical, fleshy fruits start green and later turn red with red pulp. Chromosome count is 4n=44.

This species is distinguished by many ribs, high number of radial spines, and red pulp from its fruits.

== Distribution ==
Plants are found growing near Cuatro Ciénegas, Coahuila, Mexico at elevations below 1400 meters.

== Taxonomy ==
The plant was collected in 2010 and determined to be a new species in 2014 where it was described in the Echinocereus Online Journal. The species was named after cactus researcher Dieter Felix.
