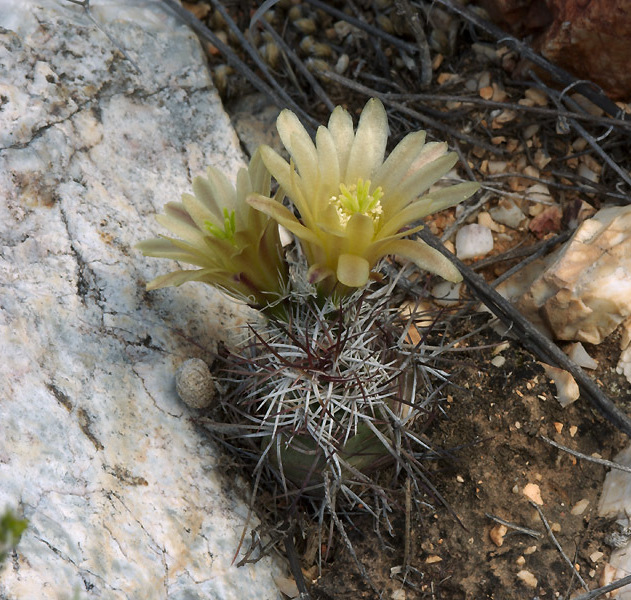

Scientific classification
- Kingdom: Plantae
- Clade: Tracheophytes
- Clade: Angiosperms
- Clade: Eudicots
- Order: Caryophyllales
- Family: Cactaceae
- Subfamily: Cactoideae
- Genus: Echinocereus
- Species: E. davisii

Binomial name
- Echinocereus davisii Houghton 1931

Synonyms
- Echinocereus subinermis var. aculeatus G.Unger 1984; Echinocereus viridiflorus subsp. davisii (Houghton) N.P.Taylor 1997; Echinocereus viridiflorus var. davisii (Houghton) W.T.Marshall 1941

= Echinocereus davisii =

Species of cactus

Echinocereus davisii is a species of cactus native to Texas.
