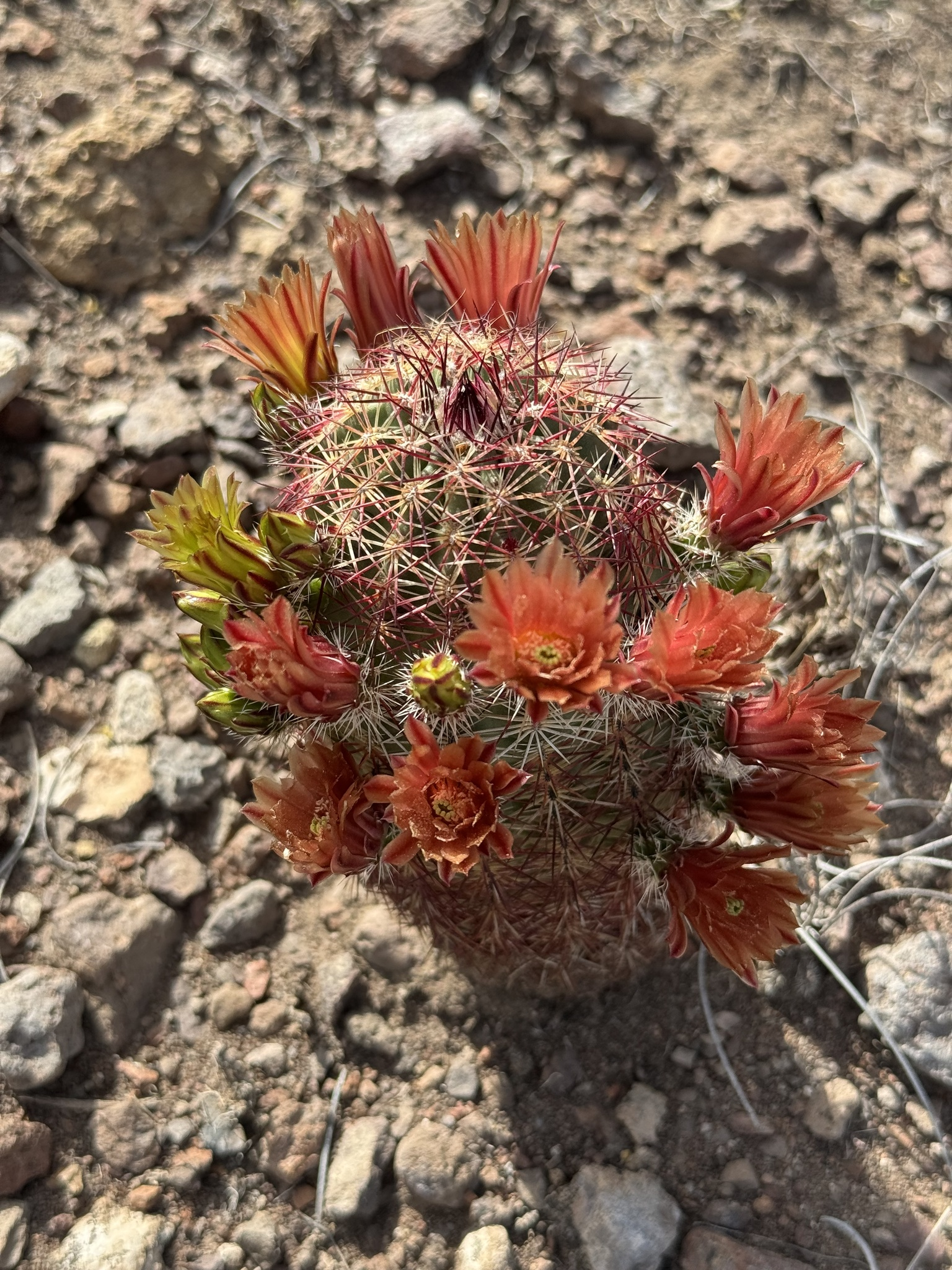

Scientific classification
- Kingdom: Plantae
- Clade: Tracheophytes
- Clade: Angiosperms
- Clade: Eudicots
- Order: Caryophyllales
- Family: Cactaceae
- Subfamily: Cactoideae
- Genus: Echinocereus
- Species: E. chloranthus

Binomial name
- Echinocereus chloranthus (Engelm.) Haage 1859

Synonyms
- Cereus chloranthus Engelm. 1857 publ. 1856; Echinocereus viridiflorus subsp. chloranthus (Engelm.) N.P.Taylor 1997; Echinocereus viridiflorus var. chloranthus (Engelm.) Backeb. 1960

= Echinocereus chloranthus =

Species of cactus

Echinocereus chloranthus is a species of cactus native to Mexico and southern United States.
