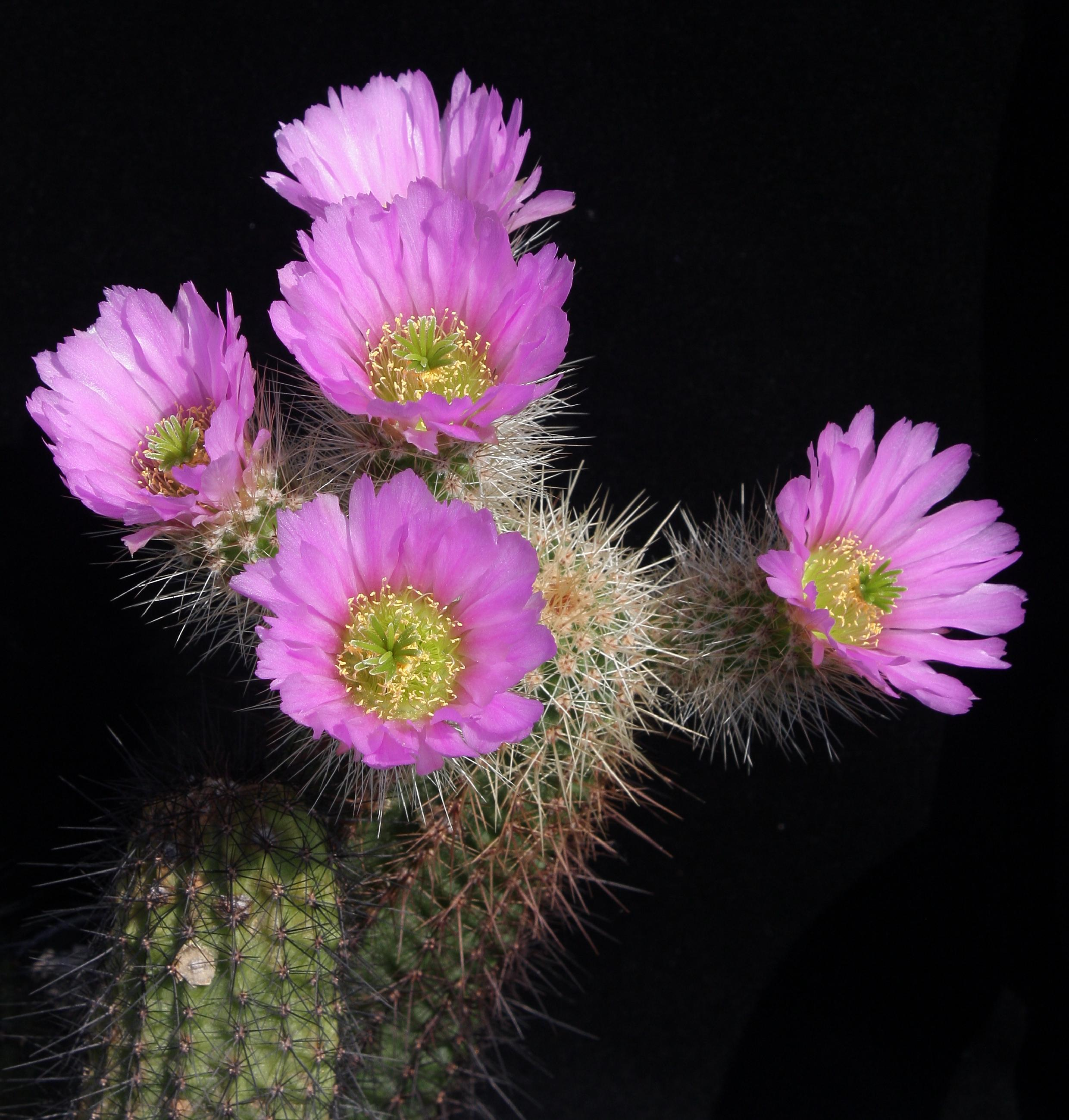

Conservation status
- Least Concern (IUCN 3.1)

Scientific classification
- Kingdom: Plantae
- Clade: Tracheophytes
- Clade: Angiosperms
- Clade: Eudicots
- Order: Caryophyllales
- Family: Cactaceae
- Subfamily: Cactoideae
- Genus: Echinocereus
- Species: E. spinigemmatus

Binomial name
- Echinocereus spinigemmatus A.B.Lau

= Echinocereus spinigemmatus =

Species of cactus

Echinocereus spinigemmatus is a species of cactus native to Mexico.

== Description ==
Echinocereus spinigesmatus usually branches and forms loose groups consisting of seven to ten shoots. The green cylindrical shoots gradually taper towards their tip. They are up to 30 cm (12 in) long and have a diameter of 4 to 7 cm (1.6 to 2.8 in). There are ten to 14 ribs that are slightly tuberous. The two to four yellowish and protruding central spines are difficult to distinguish from the peripheral spines. They are 0.5 to 4 cm (0.20 to 1.57 in) long. The ten to 13 slender and yellowish marginal spines are 0.3 to 2.3 cm (0.12 to 0.91 in) long.

The funnel-shaped flowers are slightly pinkish lilac to light purple. They appear near the tips of the shoots, are 4 to 5 cm (1.6 to 2.0 in) long and reach 5 to 6 cm (2.0 to 2.4 in) in diameter. The green egg-shaped fruits are heavily thorny.

== Distribution ==
Echinocereus spinigesmatus is distributed in the Mexican states of Zacatecas and Jalisco.

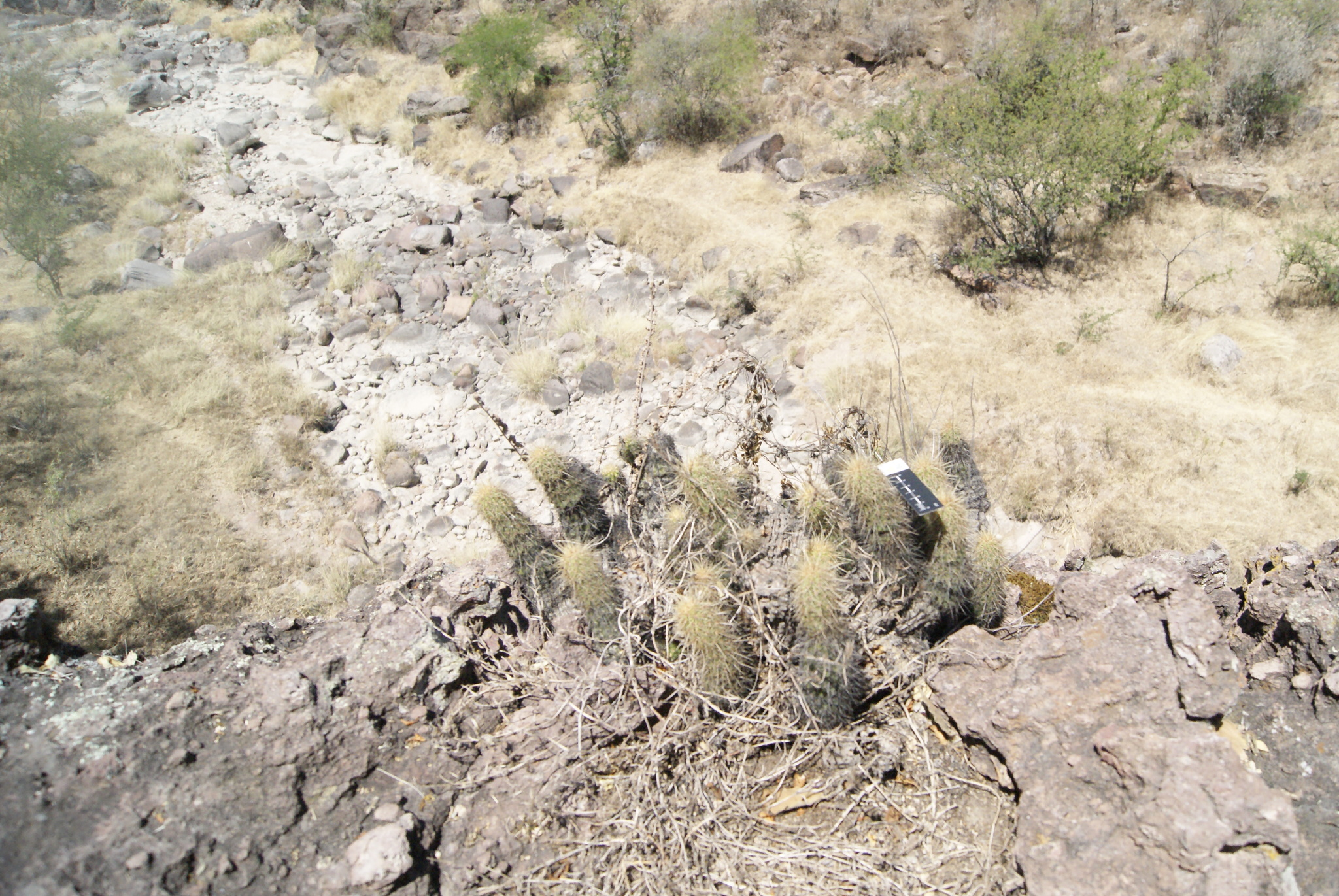
Habitat in Acatita de Arriba, Zacatecas, Mexico

== Taxonomy ==
The first description by Alfred Bernhard Lau was published in 1984. The specific epithet spinigtematus is derived from the Latin words spina for 'sting' or 'thorn' and gemmatus for 'to have buds'. It refers to the species' thorny flower buds.
