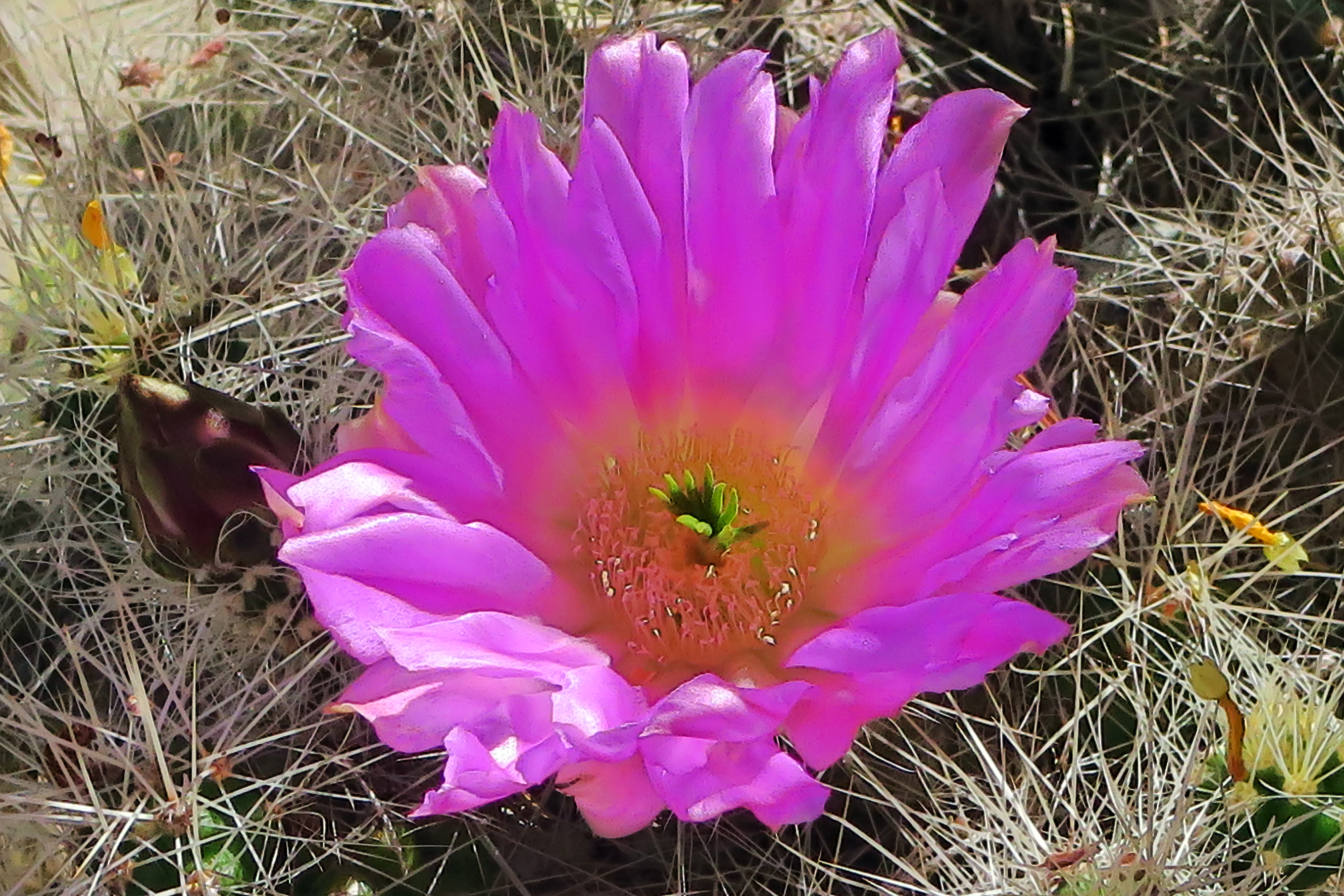

Scientific classification
- Kingdom: Plantae
- Clade: Embryophytes
- Clade: Tracheophytes
- Clade: Spermatophytes
- Clade: Angiosperms
- Clade: Eudicots
- Order: Caryophyllales
- Family: Cactaceae
- Subfamily: Cactoideae
- Genus: Echinocereus
- Species: E. apachensis

Binomial name
- Echinocereus apachensis W.Blum & Rutow 1998

Synonyms
- Echinocereus bonkerae subsp. apachensis (W.Blum & Rutow) A.D.Zimmerman 2009

= Echinocereus apachensis =

Species of cactus

Echinocereus apachensis is a species of cactus native to Mexico.

== Description ==
Echinocereus apachensis grows in clusters of up to 30 stems. The green cylindrical stems are up to 50 cm (20 in) long and 4 to 6 cm (1.6 to 2.4 in) in diameter. It has twelve to eighteen low ribs that are barely notched. There are one to three downward-pointing central spines, which are curved or twisted and range in color from white to yellowish to brown, with lengths of 1.5 to 10 cm (0.59 to 3.94 in). The twelve to sixteen white to yellowish radial spines spread out or lie against the stems and are 0.5 to 1.5 cm (0.20 to 0.59 in) long.

The funnel-shaped flowers are scarlet with a darker throat and central stripe. They appear below the stem tips, growing up to 5 cm (2.0 in) long and 4 to 6 cm (1.6 to 2.4 in) in diameter. The spherical to egg-shaped orange fruits are 1 to 2.5 cm (0.39 to 0.98 in) long and wide, often splitting open when ripe.

== Description ==
Echinocereus apachensis is native to Arizona, USA. It is found growing in the Pinal and Santa Catalina Mountains of the Sonoran Desert growing on grassland and chaparral shrublands at elevations from 700 to 1500 meters.

== Taxonomy ==
It was first described by Wolfgang Blum and Jürgen Rutow in 1998. The species name "apachensis" refers to its occurrence near the Apache Trail.
