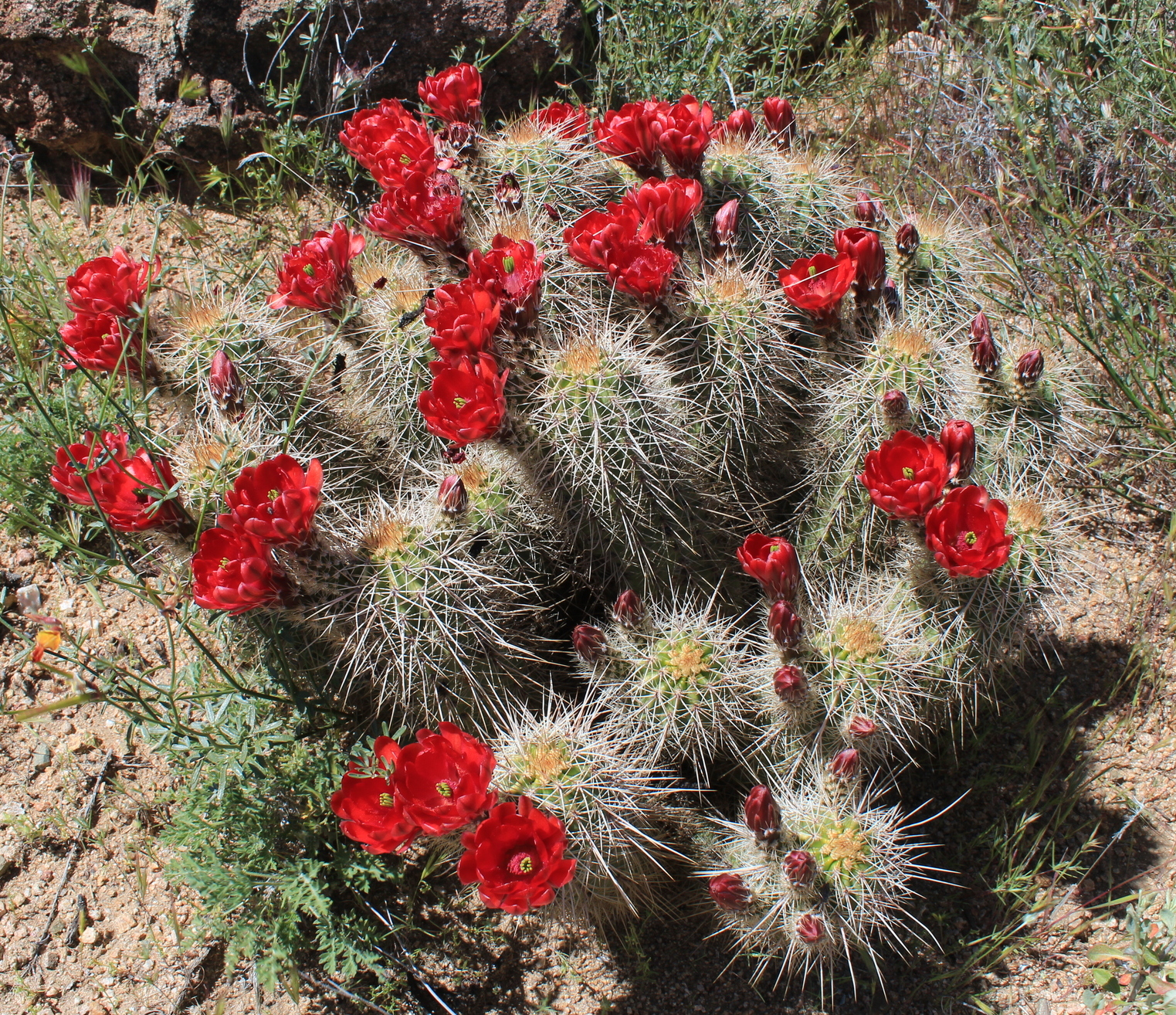

Scientific classification
- Kingdom: Plantae
- Clade: Tracheophytes
- Clade: Angiosperms
- Clade: Eudicots
- Order: Caryophyllales
- Family: Cactaceae
- Subfamily: Cactoideae
- Genus: Echinocereus
- Species: E. yavapaiensis

Binomial name
- Echinocereus yavapaiensis M.A.Baker 2006

= Echinocereus yavapaiensis =

Species of cactus

Echinocereus yavapaiensis is a species of cactus native to Arizona.

== Description ==
The plant forms small clumps consisting of many stems. The dark green plant body is ovate to cylindrical and reaches heights of up to 30–48 cm (12–19 in) with a diameter of 5–8 cm (2.0–3.1 in). The 10 to 14 ribs often form warts. The spines are yellow brown becoming grey. The areoles have 1-3 central spines are up to 6 cm (2.4 in) long and 9 radial spines that are 2 cm (0.79 in) long. The broad, funnel-shaped, dimorphic, red flowers appear below the shoot tip. They are 5.4 cm (2.1 in) long and have a diameter of 3.8 cm (1.5 in). Chromosome count is 6n=66.

== Distribution ==
Plants are found growing in bedrock outcrops with desert scrub in Yavapai County, Arizona, at elevations between 1035 and 1860 meters.

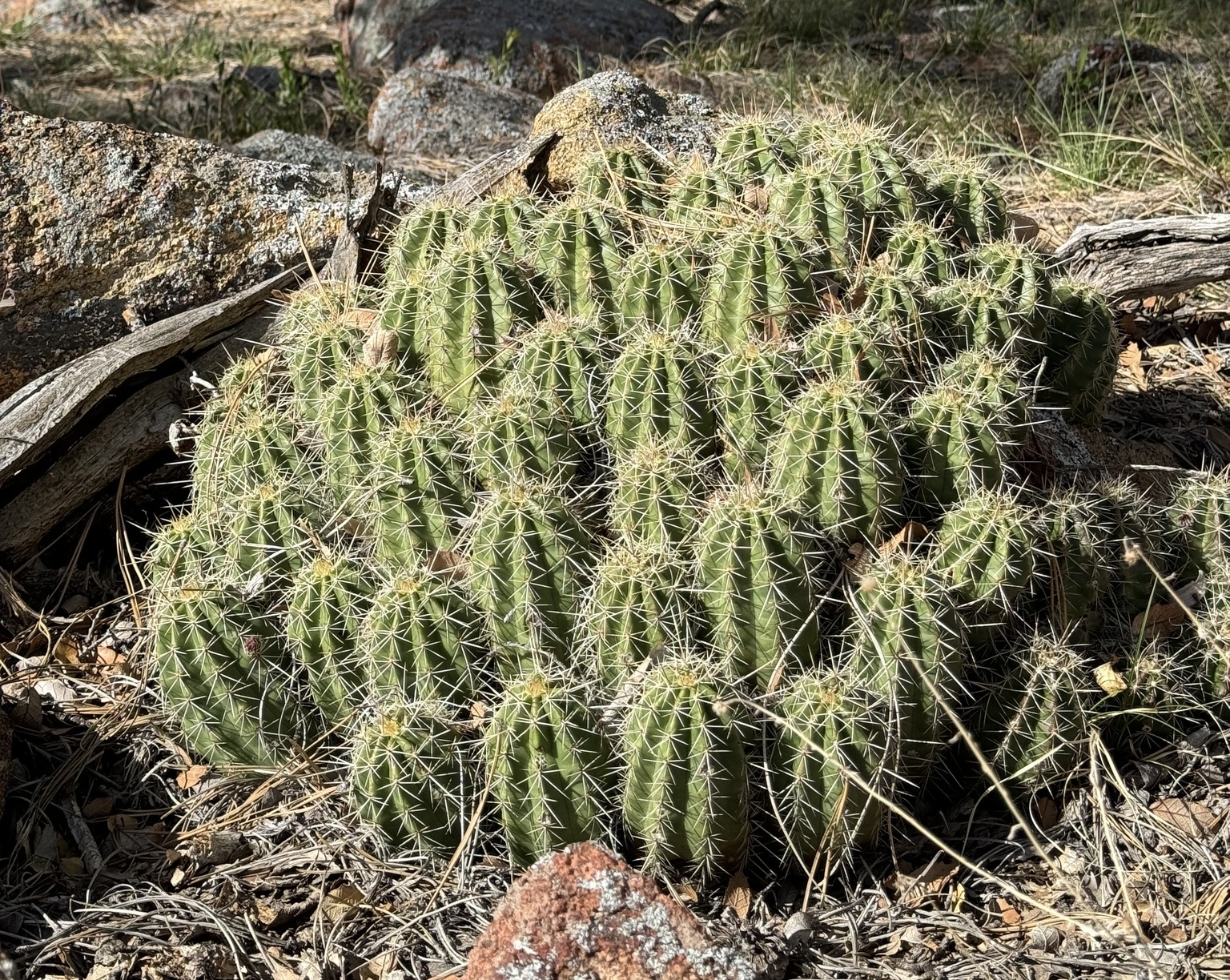
Habitat in Yavapai County, Arizona

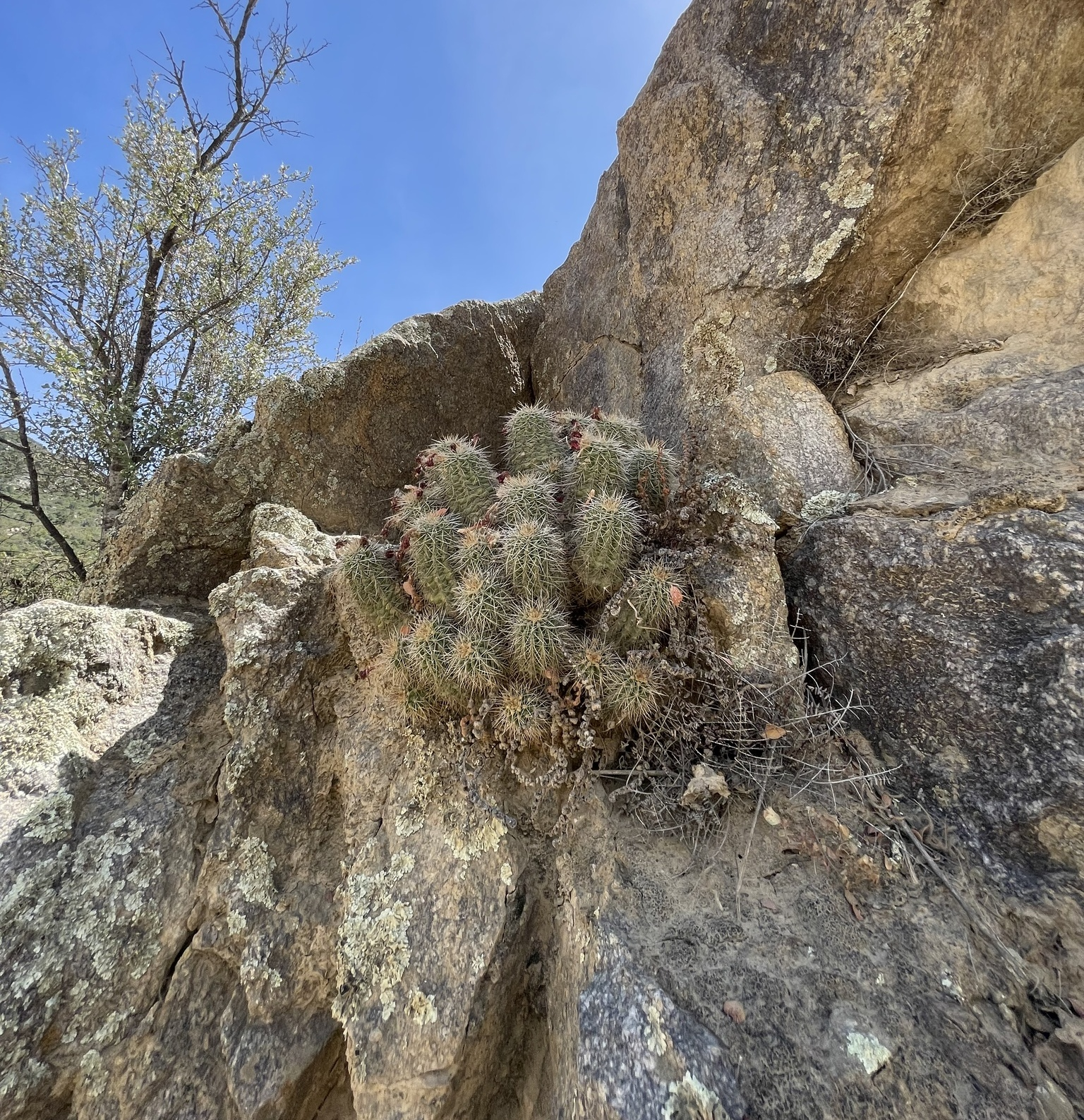
Habitat in Crown King, Arizona

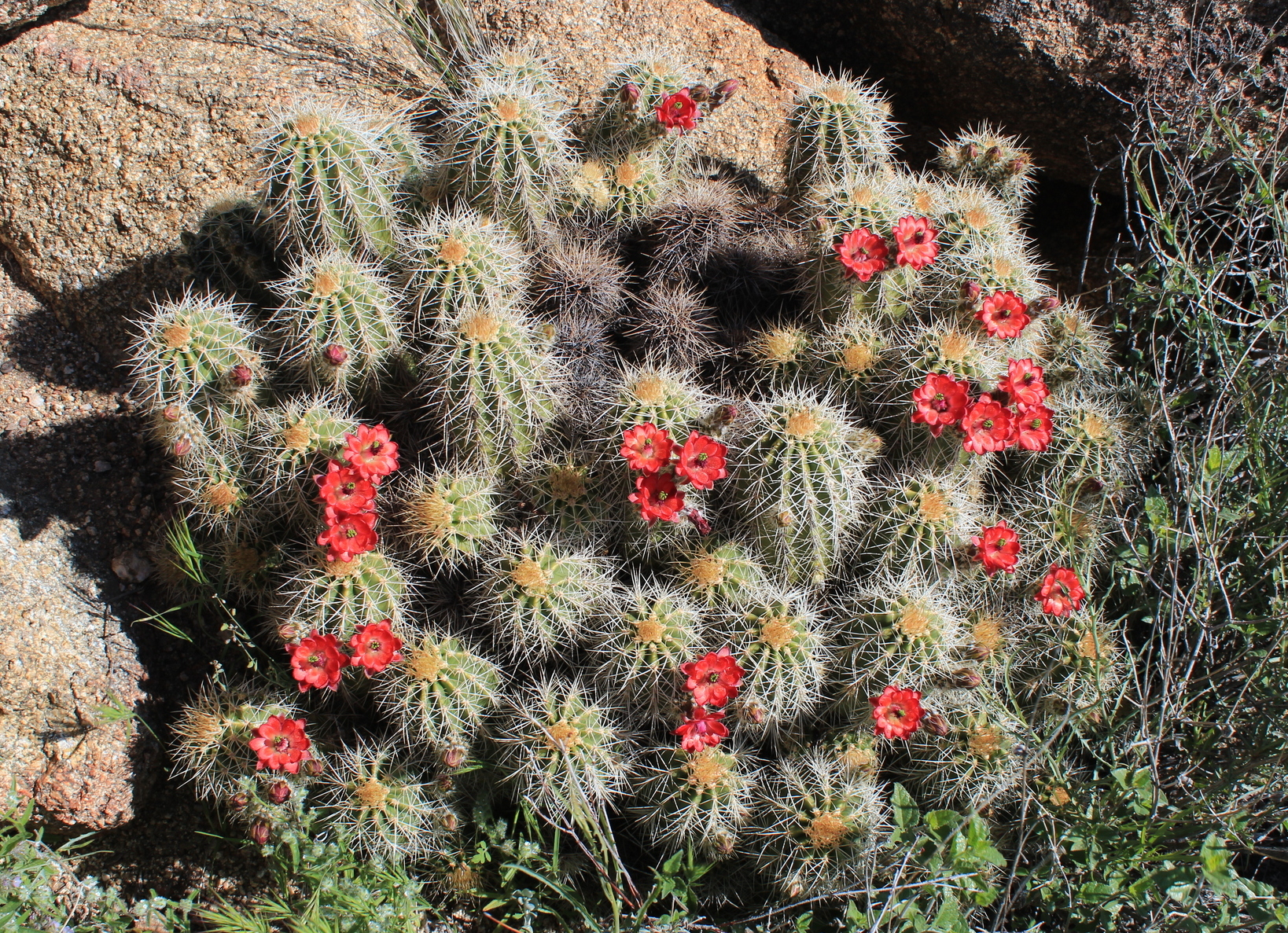
Plant blooming in Congress, Arizona
