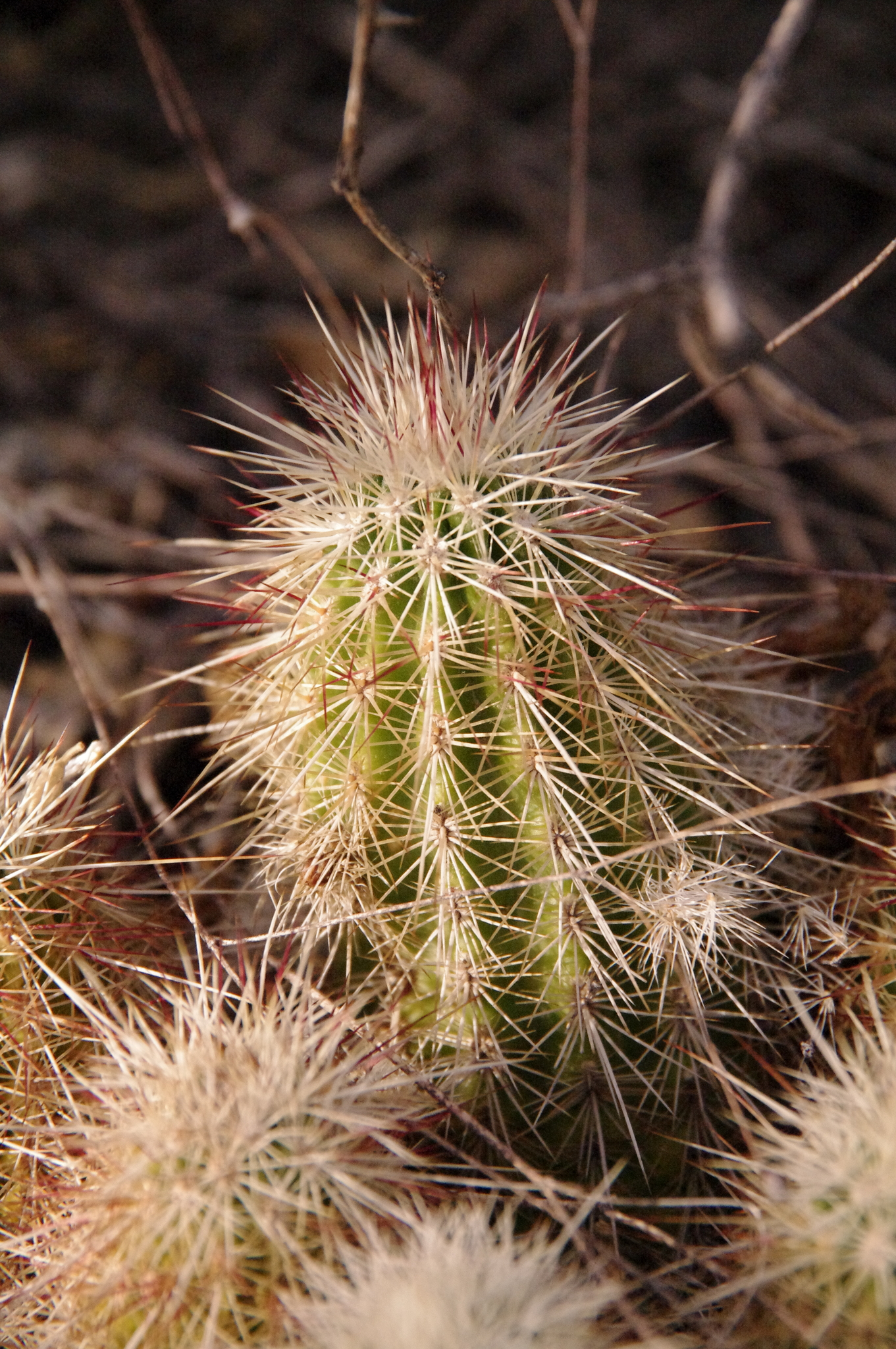

Scientific classification
- Kingdom: Plantae
- Clade: Tracheophytes
- Clade: Angiosperms
- Clade: Eudicots
- Order: Caryophyllales
- Family: Cactaceae
- Subfamily: Cactoideae
- Genus: Echinocereus
- Species: E. milleri

Binomial name
- Echinocereus milleri W.Blum, Kuenzler & Oldach 1999

= Echinocereus milleri =

Species of cactus

Echinocereus milleri is a species of cactus native to Texas.
