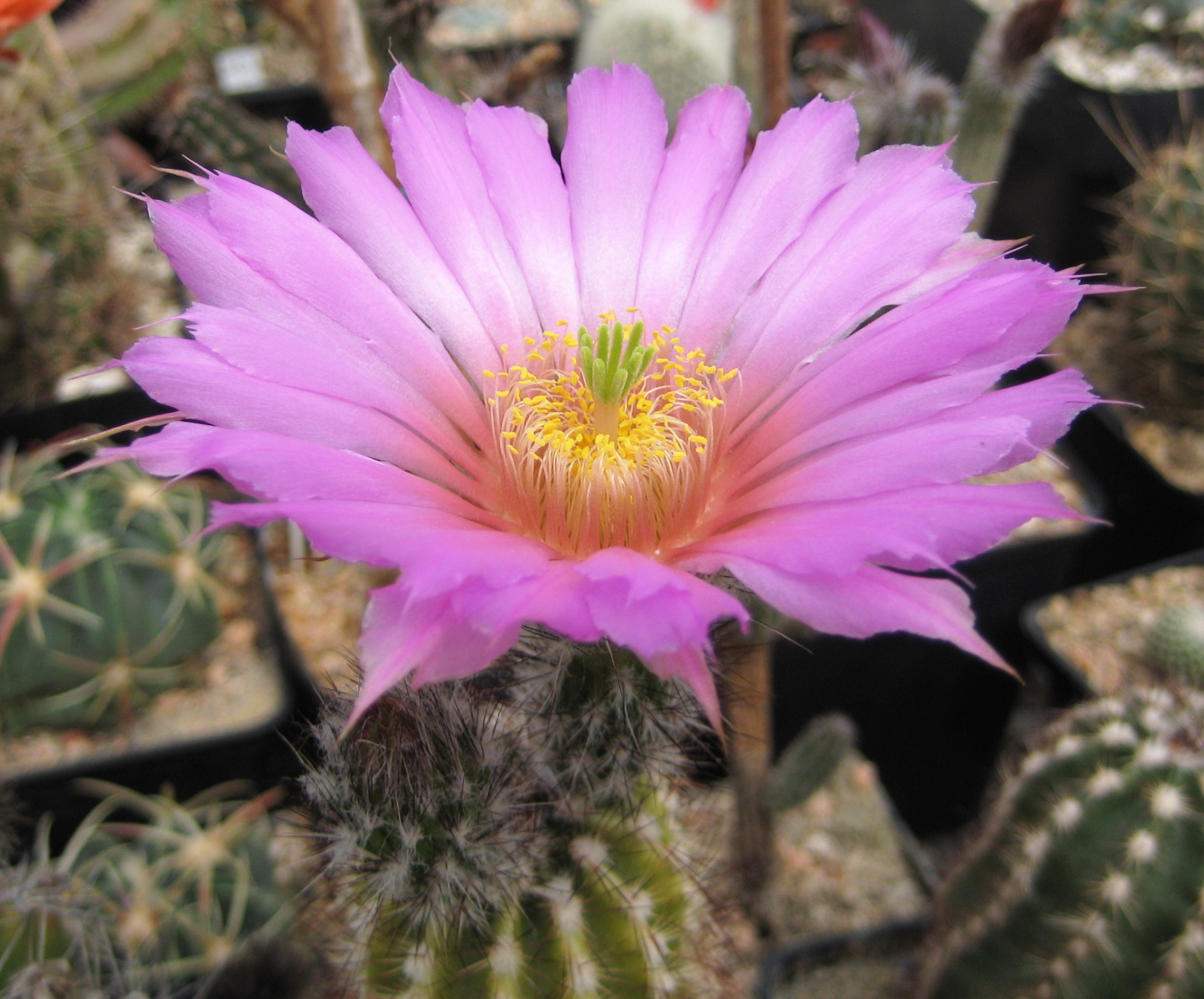

Conservation status
- Least Concern (IUCN 3.1)

Scientific classification
- Kingdom: Plantae
- Clade: Tracheophytes
- Clade: Angiosperms
- Clade: Eudicots
- Order: Caryophyllales
- Family: Cactaceae
- Subfamily: Cactoideae
- Genus: Echinocereus
- Species: E. palmeri

Binomial name
- Echinocereus palmeri Britton & Rose 1922

= Echinocereus palmeri =

Species of cactus

Echinocereus palmeri is a species of cactus native to Mexico.

== Description ==
Echinocereus palmeri can grow either as a single stem or with several side shoots, and it develops a thick, prominent taproot. Its dark green shoots are ovate to cylindrical in shape, tapering toward the tips. These shoots show constrictions caused by annual new growth. They measure 3 to 8 centimeters in length, occasionally up to 15 centimeters, and are 2 to 3 centimeters in diameter. The shoots are not covered by spines. The plant has six to twelve low ribs that are only faintly tubercled. It features one to two, sometimes up to three, slender, ascending central spines that are brown to black and 1 to 2 centimeters long. Additionally, it has eight to sixteen whitish radial spines with darker tips; these lie flat against the shoot surface and are 0.4 to 0.8 centimeters long. The flowers are funnel-shaped, pinkish-lavender to pink, and fragrant. They appear near the tips of the shoots, are up to 6 centimeters long, and can reach a diameter of 6 centimeters, occasionally up to 9 centimeters. The egg-shaped fruits are green and contain white pulp.

== Subspecies ==
There are two recognized subspecies:

Image	Scientific name	Distribution
	Echinocereus palmeri subsp. mazapil H.M.Hern. & Gómez-Hin.	Mexico (Zacatecas)
	Echinocereus palmeri subsp. palmeri	Mexico (C. & S. Chihuahua, Durango)

== Distribution ==
Echinocereus palmeri is native to the Mexican states of Chihuahua, Durango and Zacatecas.

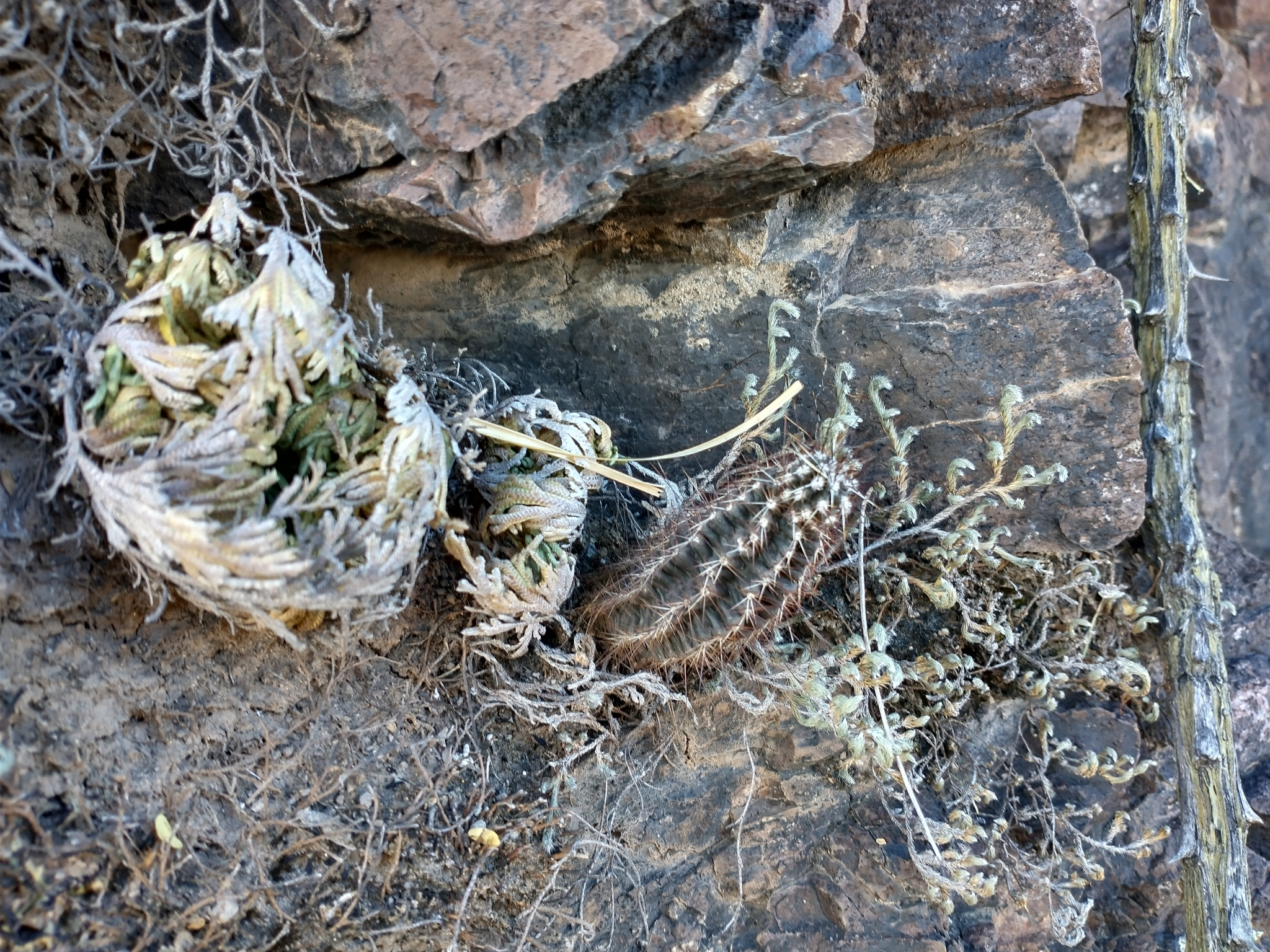
Echinocereus palmeri palmeri in San Miguel, Chihuahua, Mexico

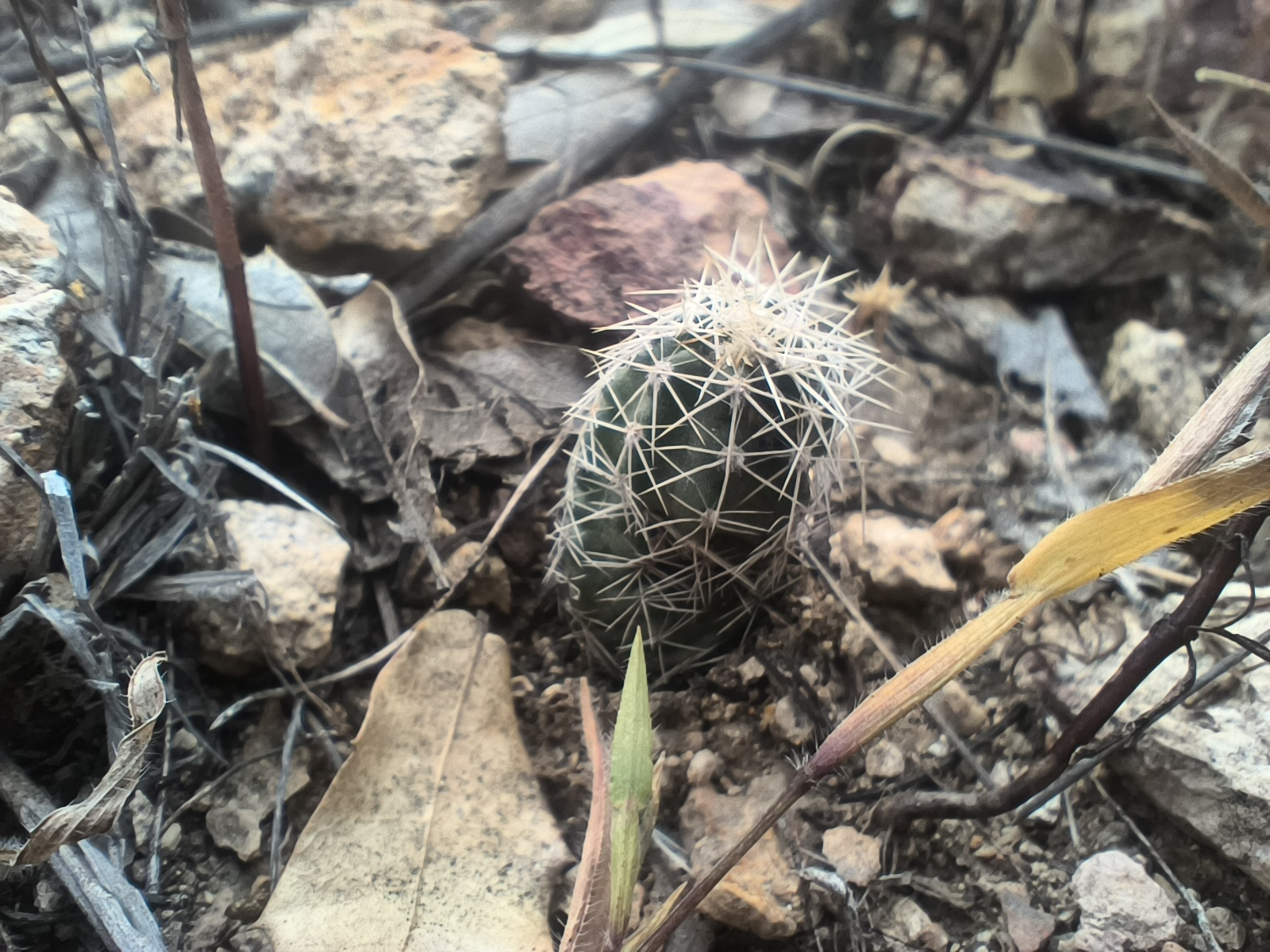
Habitat in Las Varas, Chihuahua, Mexico

== Taxonomy ==
The species was first described by botanists Nathaniel Lord Britton and Joseph Nelson Rose in 1922 from a plant collected near Chihuahua City. The name "palmeri" honors the British botanist and plant collector Edward Palmer.
