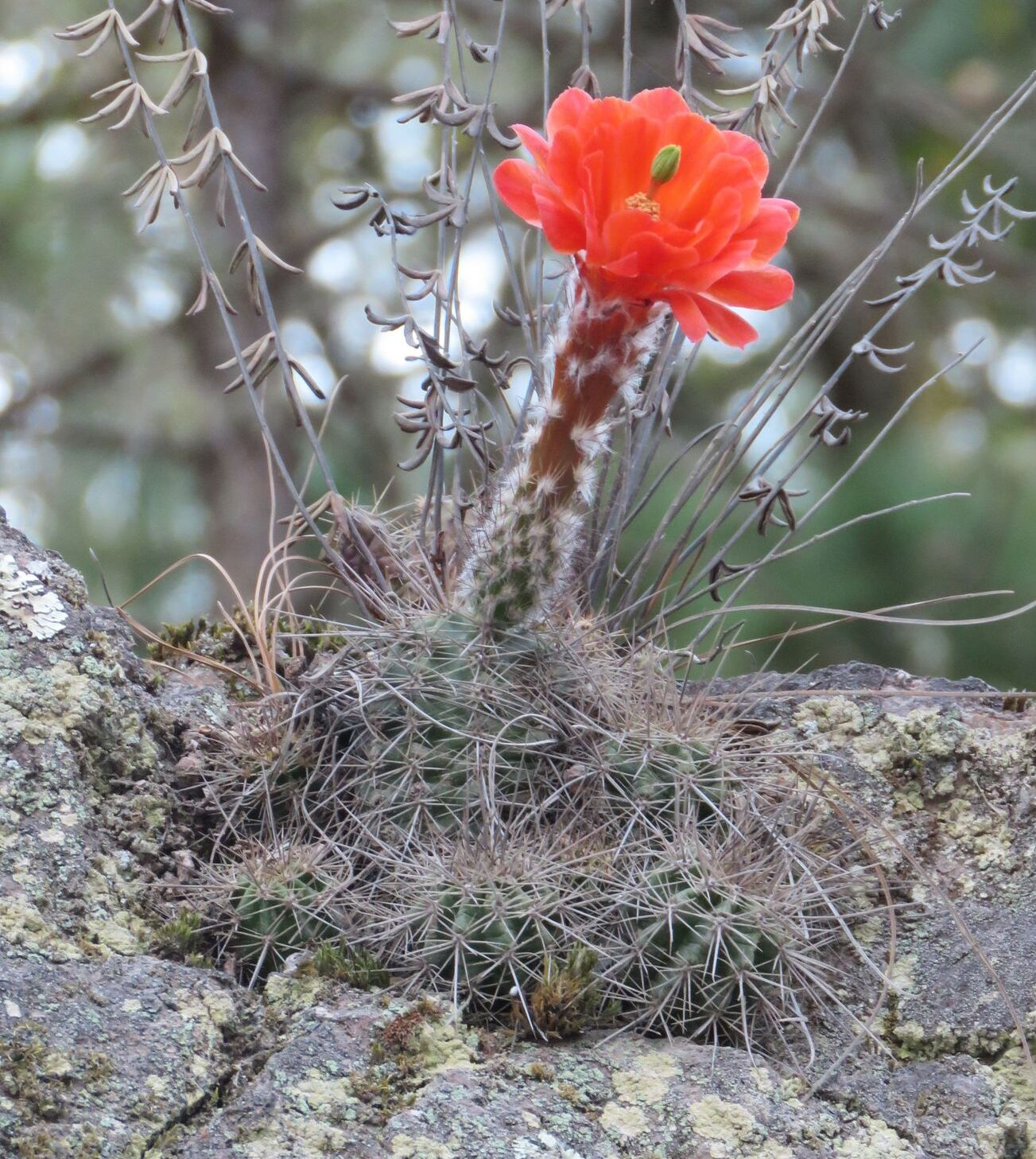

Scientific classification
- Kingdom: Plantae
- Clade: Tracheophytes
- Clade: Angiosperms
- Clade: Eudicots
- Order: Caryophyllales
- Family: Cactaceae
- Subfamily: Cactoideae
- Genus: Echinocereus
- Species: E. marksianus

Binomial name
- Echinocereus marksianus Fritz Schwarz ex Backeb. 1966

Synonyms
- Echinocereus marksianus F.Schwarz ex W.Blum & R.Goris 2023

= Echinocereus marksianus =

Species of cactus

Echinocereus marksianus is a species of cactus native to Mexico.
