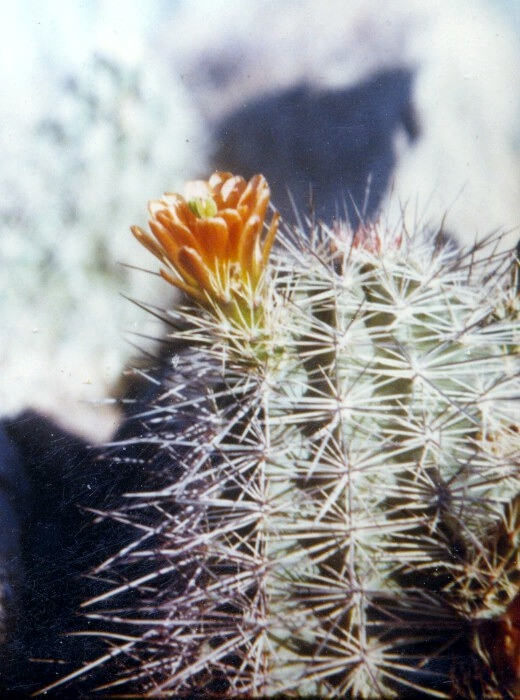

Scientific classification
- Kingdom: Plantae
- Clade: Tracheophytes
- Clade: Angiosperms
- Clade: Eudicots
- Order: Caryophyllales
- Family: Cactaceae
- Subfamily: Cactoideae
- Genus: Echinocereus
- Species: E. × neomexicanus

Binomial name
- Echinocereus × neomexicanus Standl.

= Echinocereus × neomexicanus =

Species of cactus

Echinocereus × neomexicanus is a natural hybrid between Echinocereus coccineus subsp. rosei and Echinocereus viridiflorus subsp. chloranthus. Lyman Benson confused the plant with Echinocereus coccineus subsp. rosei under the name Echinocereus triglochidiatus var. neomexicanus. The plant was originally described by Paul Carpenter Standley in Bulletin of the Torrey Botanical Club 35:87 (1908) based on a specimen growing in the cactus garden of the New Mexico College of Agriculture and Mechanic Arts from among hundreds of specimens he had collected from the mesa west of the Organ Mountains.

== Bibliography ==
- Benson, Lyman: Cacti of the United States and Canada, (1982).
- Benson, Lyman: The Cacti of Arizona, ed 3, (1969) p. 449.
- Blum, Lange, Rischer & Rutow: Echinocereus, (1998) p. 129.
- Powell, A. Michael & James F. Weedin: Cacti of the Trans-Pecos and Adjacent Areas, (2004) p. 211.
- Standley, Paul C. : "Some Echinocerei of New Mexico". Bulletin of the Torrey Botanical Club 35:87 (1908).
