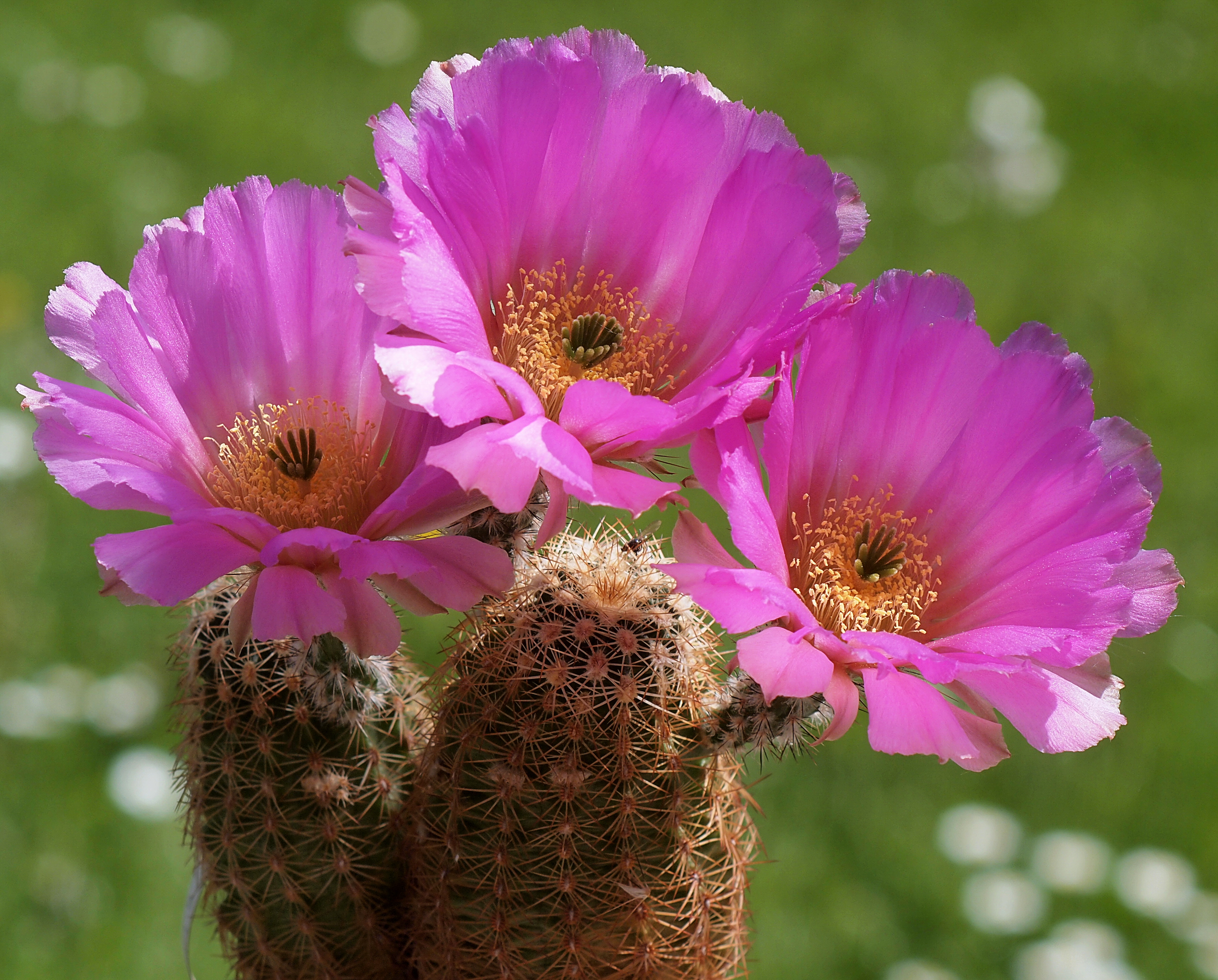

Conservation status
- Least Concern (IUCN 3.1)

Scientific classification
- Kingdom: Plantae
- Clade: Embryophytes
- Clade: Tracheophytes
- Clade: Angiosperms
- Clade: Eudicots
- Order: Caryophyllales
- Family: Cactaceae
- Subfamily: Cactoideae
- Genus: Echinocereus
- Species: E. pamanesii

Binomial name
- Echinocereus pamanesii A.B.Lau 1981

Synonyms
- Echinocereus adustus subsp. bonatzii (R.C.Römer) N.P.Taylor 1998; Echinocereus bonatzii R.C.Römer 1995; Echinocereus pamanesii subsp. bonatzii (R.C.Römer) R.C.Römer 1997; Echinocereus pamanesii subsp. pamanesii

= Echinocereus pamanesii =

Species of cactus

Echinocereus pamanesii is a species of cactus native to Mexico.

== Description ==
Echinocereus pamanesii usually grows solitary. The dark green cylindrical shoots are up to 35 cm (14 in) long and have a diameter of 8 cm (3.1 in) with twelve to 19 ribs. The up to two protruding to spreading central spines, which can also be missing, are brownish. They are up to 1.7 cm (0.67 in) long. The nine to twelve yellowish to whitish radial spines lie on the surface of the shoot and are up to 1 cm (0.39 in) long.

The funnel-shaped flowers are deep pink and have a whitish throat. They appear well below the shoot tips, are up to 9 centimeters long and reach the same diameter. The egg-shaped brownish green fruits are woolly and have thorns.

== Distribution ==
Echinocereus pamanesii is found in the rocky hills in Mexican state of Zacatecas.

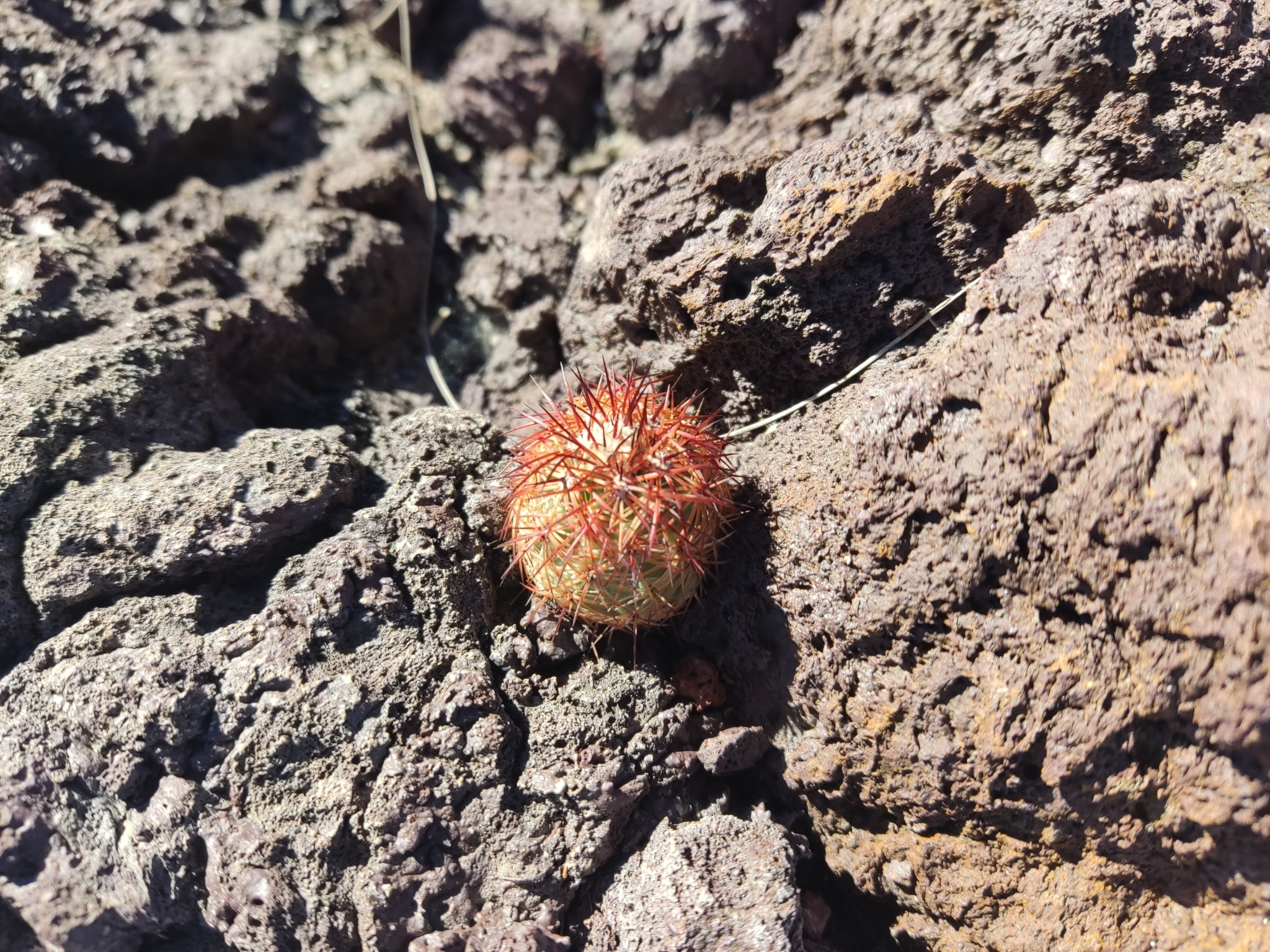
Plant growing in Veintisiete de Noviembre, Durango, Mexico

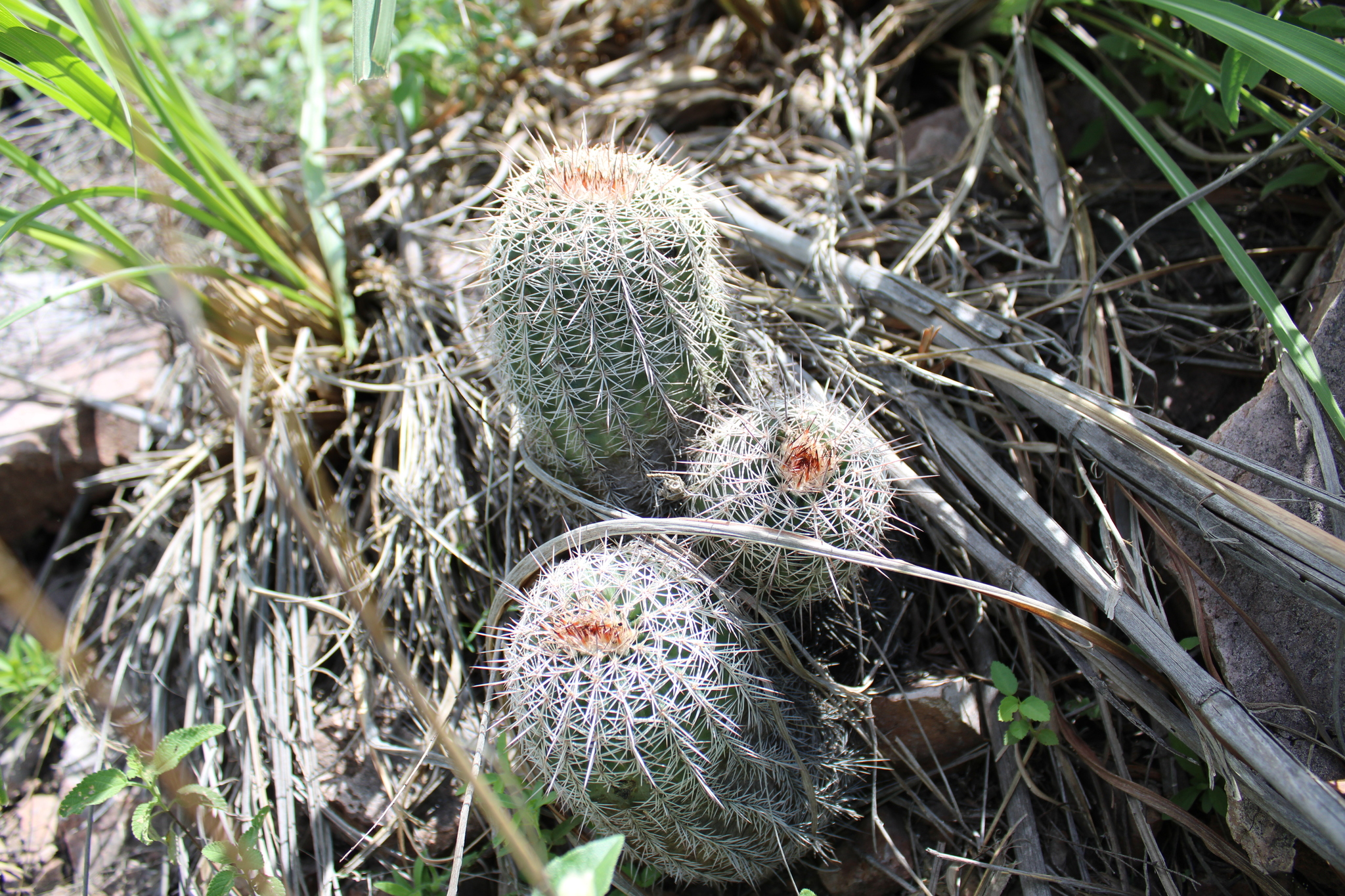
Habitat in Puerto del Aguililla, Durango, Mexico

== Taxonomy ==
The first description by Alfred Bernhard Lau was published in 1981. The specific epithet "pamanesii" honors the Mexican politician General Fernando Pámanes Escobedo, a former governor of the state of Zacatecas, who supported Alfred Bernhard Lau on his travels.
