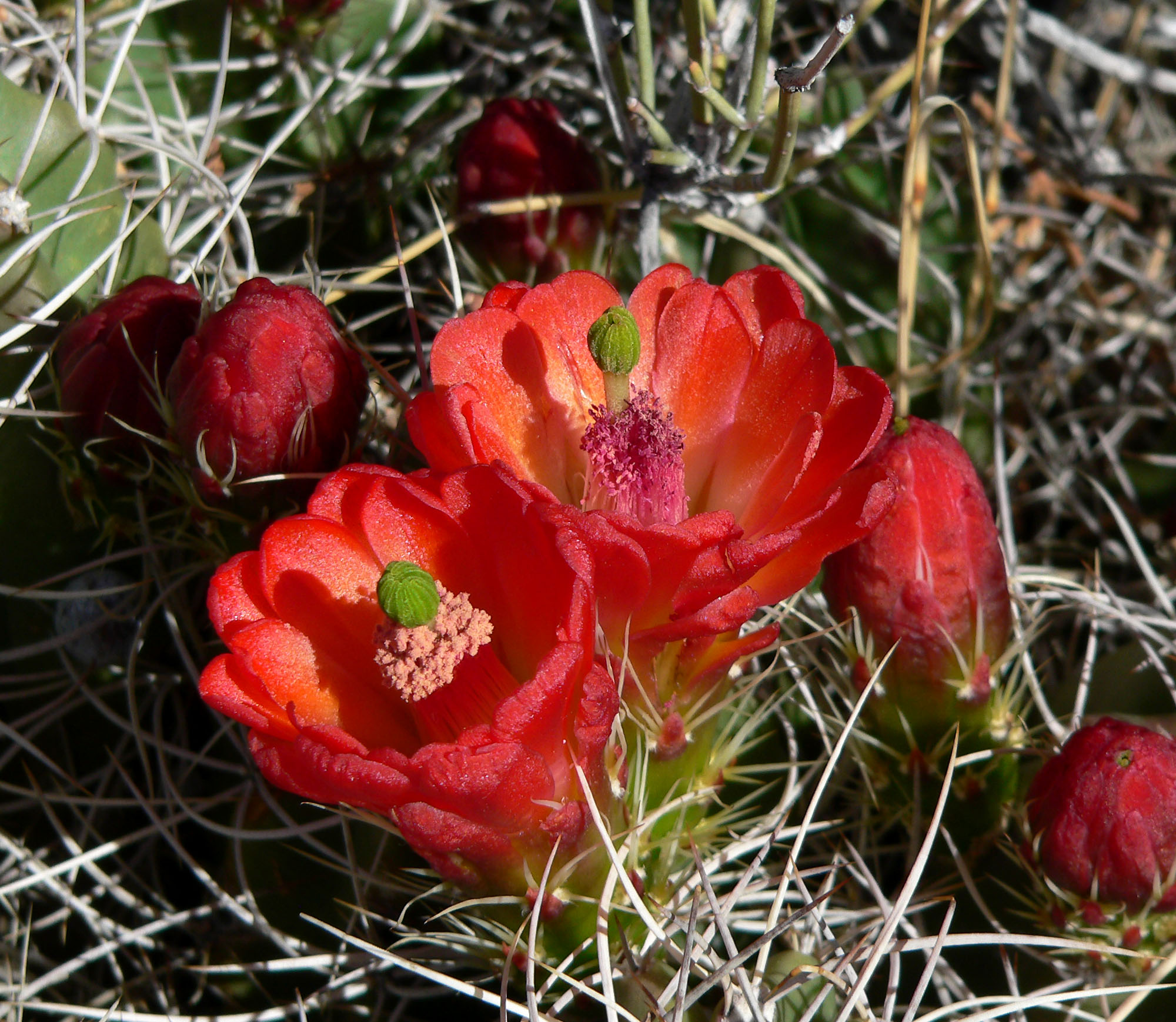
- Echinocereus triglochidiatus

Scientific classification
- Kingdom: Plantae
- Clade: Tracheophytes
- Clade: Angiosperms
- Clade: Eudicots
- Order: Caryophyllales
- Family: Cactaceae
- Subfamily: Cactoideae
- Tribe: Echinocereeae
- Genus: Echinocereus; Engelm.

Type species
- Echinocereus viridiflorus

Species
- See text

Synonyms
- Wilcoxia Britton & Rose

= Echinocereus =

Genus of plants

Echinocereus is a genus of ribbed, usually small to medium-sized, cylindrical shaped cacti, comprising about 70 species native to the southern United States and Mexico in very sunny, rocky places. Usually the flowers are large and the fruit edible.

The name comes from the Ancient Greek ἐχῖνος (echinos), meaning "sea urchin", and the Latin cereus meaning "candle". They are sometimes known as hedgehog cacti, a term also used for the Pediocactus and Echinopsis.

== Description ==
The species of the genus Echinocereus grow solitary or branching with prostrate to erect shoots that are spherical to cylindrical. The roots are fibrous or bulbous. The plants reach heights of growth between 1 and 60 centimeters. On the tips of the 4 to 26 ribs, which are mostly clear and only rarely resolved into humps, are the areoles, from which differently shaped spines can arise.

A distinctive characteristic and likely synapomorphy of the genus is the erumpent flowers. The floral buds develop internally and break through the epidermis of the stem. This flower morphology is likely an adaptation to protect the developing buds from low temperatures. Upon maturity, the flowers are usually brightly colored and open during the day. Echinocereus floral color is variable because perianth color reflects pollinator specificity. Red flowers are generally associated with hummingbird pollination, while pink flowers tend to correspond to moth pollination. Their pericarp and floral tubes are studded with thorns, bristles, and sometimes wool. The scar is usually green, but sometimes white in color.

The spherical to ovoid fruits are green to red and mostly thorny. They are mostly juicy and open along a longitudinal slit. The sometimes fragrant fruits contain broadly oval, black, tuberous seeds 0.8 to 2 millimeters long.

== Taxonomy ==
Echinocereus is a genus in the tribe Echinocereeae within the subfamily Cactoideae of the Cactaceae family. The Cactoideae can be further divided into two sister clades, Cactoideae I and II. Echinocereus is situated within the Cactoideae I clade within the Pachycereeae tribe, a tribe that represents a diversification that yielded columnar and arborescent forms. Echinocereus emerged 4.6 ± 1.7 million years ago. Echinocereus is a strongly supported monophyletic genus that is sister to Stenocereus, although there has historically been substantial debate about infrageneric classification because of the genus's high rates of morphological variation and convergent evolution.

== Cultivation ==
Echinocereus spp. are easier to cultivate than many other cacti. They need light soil, a sunny exposure, and a fresh and dry winter to flower. They grow better in soil slightly richer than other cacti. In the wild, several of the species are cold hardy, tolerating temperatures as low as −23 °C, but only in dry conditions.

== Species ==
The following species are recognized in the genus Echinocereus by Plants of the World Online. They are separated by sections established in Phylogeny in Echinocereus (Cactaceae) based on combined morphological and molecular evidence: taxonomic implications 2017.

Section	Image	Scientific name	Subspecies	Distribution
Costati (Engelm.) N.P.Taylor (1994)		Echinocereus berlandieri (Engelm.) Haage		Mexico, Texas
Costati (Engelm.) N.P.Taylor (1994)		Echinocereus cinerascens (DC.) Lem.	Echinocereus cinerascens subsp. cinerascens; Echinocereus cinerascens subsp. septentrionalis (N.P.Taylor) N.P.Taylor; Echinocereus cinerascens subsp. tulensis (Bravo) N.P.Taylor	Texas to Mexico
Costati (Engelm.) N.P.Taylor (1994)		Echinocereus enneacanthus Engelm.		Mexico (Jalisco)
Costati (Engelm.) N.P.Taylor (1994)		Echinocereus freudenbergeri G.Frank		Mexico (S. Coahuila)
Costati (Engelm.) N.P.Taylor (1994)		Echinocereus longisetus (Engelm.) Lem.	Echinocereus longisetus subsp. delaetii (Gürke) N.P.Taylor; Echinocereus longisetus subsp. longisetus	Mexico (Coahuila).
Costati (Engelm.) N.P.Taylor (1994)		Echinocereus nivosus Glass & R.A.Foster		Mexico (SE. Coahuila, Nuevo León)
Costati (Engelm.) N.P.Taylor (1994)		Echinocereus papillosus Linke ex Rümpler		Texas to NE. Mexico
Costati (Engelm.) N.P.Taylor (1994)		Echinocereus parkeri N.P.Taylor	Echinocereus parkeri subsp. arteagensis W.Blum & Mich.Lange; Echinocereus parkeri subsp. gonzalezii (N.P.Taylor) N.P.Taylor; Echinocereus parkeri subsp. mazapilensis W.Blum & Mich.Lange; Echinocereus parkeri subsp. parkeri	Mexico.
Costati (Engelm.) N.P.Taylor (1994)		Echinocereus rayonesensis N.P.Taylor		Mexico (Coahuila, Nuevo León, Tamaulipas).
Costati (Engelm.) N.P.Taylor (1994)		Echinocereus stramineus (Engelm.) F.Seitz		New Mexico to W. Texas and NE. Mexico
Costati (Engelm.) N.P.Taylor (1994)		Echinocereus viereckii Werderm.	Echinocereus viereckii subsp. morricalii (Říha) N.P.Taylor; Echinocereus viereckii subsp. viereckii	Mexico (SW. Tamaulipas, Nuevo León, Coahuila).
Costati (Engelm.) N.P.Taylor (1994)		Echinocereus zapalinamensis W.Blum & J.Flores Ventura		Mexico (Coahuila)
Echinocereus		Echinocereus blumii D.Felix & H.Bauer		Mexico (Coahuila)
Echinocereus		Echinocereus canus D.Felix & H.Bauer		Texas
Echinocereus		Echinocereus carmenensis W.Blum, Mich.Lange & Scherer		Mexico (Coahuila)
Echinocereus		Echinocereus chloranthus (Engelm.) Haage		SE. Arizona to W. Texas and Mexico (Chihuahua)
Echinocereus		Echinocereus davisii Houghton		Texas
Echinocereus		Echinocereus mapimiensis E.F.Anderson, W.C.Hodgs. & P.Quirk		Mexico (Coahuila, Durango)
Echinocereus		Echinocereus milleri W.Blum, Kuenzler & Oldach		Texas
Echinocereus		Echinocereus neocapillus (Weniger) W.Blum & Mich.Lange		W. Texas
Echinocereus		Echinocereus pentalophus (DC.) J.N.Haage	Echinocereus pentalophus subsp. leonensis (Mathsson) N.P.Taylor; Echinocereus pentalophus subsp. pentalophus; Echinocereus pentalophus subsp. procumbens (Engelm.) W.Blum & Mich.Lange	Texas, Mexico (to Jalisco)
Echinocereus		Echinocereus occidentalis (N.P.Taylor) W.Rischer, S.Breckw. & Breckw.	Echinocereus occidentalis subsp. breckwoldtiorum De-Nova, Cast.-Lara & W.Blum; Echinocereus occidentalis subsp. occidentalis	Mexico
Echinocereus		Echinocereus russanthus D.Weniger		Texas to Mexico (Chihuahua, Coahuila)
Echinocereus		Echinocereus viridiflorus Engelm.	Echinocereus viridiflorus subsp. correllii (L.D.Benson) W.Blum & Mich.Lange; Echinocereus viridiflorus subsp. viridiflorus	SW. South Dakota to N. Texas and Mexico (Coahuila)
Erecti (K.Schum.) Bravo (1982)		Echinocereus apachensis W.Blum & Rutow		Arizona.
Erecti (K.Schum.) Bravo (1982)		Echinocereus barthelowianus Britton & Rose		Mexico (Island Magdalena)
Erecti (K.Schum.) Bravo (1982)		Echinocereus bonkerae Thornber & Bonker		Arizona
Erecti (K.Schum.) Bravo (1982)		Echinocereus brandegeei (J.M.Coult.) K.Schum.		Mexico (Baja California)
Erecti (K.Schum.) Bravo (1982)		Echinocereus dasyacanthus Engelm.	Echinocereus dasyacanthus subsp. ctenoides (Engelm.) Lodé; Echinocereus dasyacanthus subsp. dasyacanthus; Echinocereus dasyacanthus subsp. multispinosus D.Felix & H.Bauer; Echinocereus dasyacanthus subsp. rectispinus (Trocha & Fethke) W.Blum, W.Rischer & Rutow	Mexico (Coahuila)
Erecti (K.Schum.) Bravo (1982)		Echinocereus engelmannii (Parry ex Engelm.) Lem.	Echinocereus engelmannii subsp. engelmannii; Echinocereus engelmannii subsp. llanuraensis (Rutow) Felger	United States (Arizona, Colorado, New Mexico, Texas, Utah), Mexico
Erecti (K.Schum.) Bravo (1982)		Echinocereus fasciculatus (Engelm. ex B.D.Jacks.) L.D.Benson		Colorado to NE. Mexico.
Erecti (K.Schum.) Bravo (1982)		Echinocereus felixianus H.Bauer		New Mexico, Texas, Mexico (N. Sonora to N. Chihuahua)
Erecti (K.Schum.) Bravo (1982)		Echinocereus fendleri (Engelm.) Sencke ex J.N.Haage	Echinocereus fendleri subsp. fendleri; Echinocereus fendleri subsp. rectispinus (Peebles) N.P.Taylor	Arizona, California, Nevada, Utah; Mexico (Baja California, NW. Sonora).
Erecti (K.Schum.) Bravo (1982)		Echinocereus ferreirianus H.E.Gates	Echinocereus ferreirianus subsp. ferreirianus; Echinocereus ferreirianus subsp. lindsayorum (J.Meyrán) N.P.Taylor	Mexico (C Baja California)
Erecti (K.Schum.) Bravo (1982)		Echinocereus ledingii Peebles		Arizona.
Erecti (K.Schum.) Bravo (1982)		Echinocereus llanurensis (Rutow) W.Blum & D.Felix		Mexico (NW Sonora)
Erecti (K.Schum.) Bravo (1982)		Echinocereus maritimus (M.E.Jones) K.Schum.		Mexico (Baja California)
Erecti (K.Schum.) Bravo (1982)		Echinocereus nicholii (L.D.Benson) B.D.Parfitt		Arizona to Mexico (Sonora)
Erecti (K.Schum.) Bravo (1982)		Echinocereus pectinatus (Scheidw.) Engelm.	Echinocereus pectinatus subsp. pectinatus; Echinocereus pectinatus subsp. rutowiorum W.Blum; Echinocereus pectinatus subsp. wenigeri (L.D.Benson) W.Blum & Rutow	Mexico.
Erecti (K.Schum.) Bravo (1982)		Echinocereus perplexus W.Blum & A.P.Campos		Texas
Erecti (K.Schum.) Bravo (1982)		Echinocereus relictus Wellard		Utah
Pulchellus N.P.Taylor (1985)		Echinocereus acanthosetus (S.Arias & U.Guzmán) Gómez-Quintero & Dan.Sánchez		Mexico
Pulchellus N.P.Taylor (1985)		Echinocereus adustus Engelm.	Echinocereus adustus subsp. adustus; Echinocereus adustus subsp. roemerianus W.Rischer; Echinocereus adustus subsp. schwarzii (A.B.Lau) N.P.Taylor	Mexico (Chihuahua)
Pulchellus N.P.Taylor (1985)		Echinocereus knippelianus Liebner		Mexico (SE. Coahuila, Nuevo León, Tamaulipas, San Luis Potosí).
Pulchellus N.P.Taylor (1985)		Echinocereus laui G.Frank		Mexico (E. Sonora, Chihuahua)
Pulchellus N.P.Taylor (1985)		Echinocereus pamanesii A.B.Lau	Echinocereus pamanesii subsp. bonatzii (R.C.Römer) R.C.Römer; Echinocereus pamanesii subsp. pamanesii	Mexico (Zacatecas)
Pulchellus N.P.Taylor (1985)		Echinocereus pulchellus (Mart.) K.Schum.		Mexico (Hidalgo, Puebla)
Pulchellus N.P.Taylor (1985)		Echinocereus schereri G.Frank		Mexico (Durango).
Pulchellus N.P.Taylor (1985)		Echinocereus sharpii (N.P.Taylor) Dan.Sánchez & Gómez-Quintero		Mexico (Nuevo León)
Pulchellus N.P.Taylor (1985)		Echinocereus weinbergii Weing.	Echinocereus weinbergii subsp. venustus (W.Blum & W.Rischer) Gómez-Quintero & Dan.Sánchez; Echinocereus weinbergii subsp. weinbergii	Mexico (Jalisco)
Reichenbachii N.P.Taylor (1985)		Echinocereus bristolii W.T.Marshall		Mexico (Sonora)
Reichenbachii N.P.Taylor (1985)		Echinocereus chisosensis W.T.Marshall	Echinocereus chisosensis subsp. chisosensis; Echinocereus chisosensis subsp. fobeanus (Oehme) N.P.Taylor	Texas to Mexico
Reichenbachii N.P.Taylor (1985)		Echinocereus grandis Britton & Rose		Mexico (Islands de las Animas)
Reichenbachii N.P.Taylor (1985)		Echinocereus palmeri Britton & Rose	Echinocereus palmeri subsp. mazapil H.M.Hern. & Gómez-Hin.; Echinocereus palmeri subsp. palmeri	Mexico (Chihuahua, Durango)
Reichenbachii N.P.Taylor (1985)		Echinocereus primolanatus Fritz Schwarz ex N.P.Taylor		Mexico (to Jalisco).
Reichenbachii N.P.Taylor (1985)		Echinocereus pseudopectinatus (N.P.Taylor) N.P.Taylor		Arizona to Mexico (NE. Sonora)
Reichenbachii N.P.Taylor (1985)		Echinocereus reichenbachii (Terscheck ex Walp.) J.N.Haage	Echinocereus reichenbachii subsp. armatus (Poselger) N.P.Taylor; Echinocereus reichenbachii subsp. baileyi (Rose) N.P.Taylor; Echinocereus reichenbachii subsp. burrensis G.Frank, Metorn & E.Scherer; Echinocereus reichenbachii subsp. fitchii (Britton & Rose) N.P.Taylor; Echinocereus reichenbachii subsp. perbellus (Britton & Rose) N.P.Taylor; Echinocereus reichenbachii subsp. reichenbachii	Colorado, Kansas, New Mexico, Oklahoma, Texas; Mexico
Reichenbachii N.P.Taylor (1985)		Echinocereus rigidissimus (Engelm.) Rose	Echinocereus rigidissimus subsp. rigidissimus; Echinocereus rigidissimus subsp. rubispinus (G.Frank & A.B.Lau) N.P.Taylor	New Mexico, Arizona and N. Mexico
Reichenbachii N.P.Taylor (1985)		Echinocereus sciurus (K.Brandegee) Dams	Echinocereus sciurus subsp. floresii (Schwarz ex Backeb.) N.P.Taylor; Echinocereus sciurus subsp. sciurus	Mexico (S Baja California Sur)
Reichenbachii N.P.Taylor (1985)		Echinocereus scopulorum Britton & Rose		Mexico (to Nayarit)
Reichenbachii N.P.Taylor (1985)		Echinocereus spinigemmatus A.B.Lau		Mexico (NW Jalisco, W Zacatecas)
Reichenbachii N.P.Taylor (1985)		Echinocereus stoloniferus W.T.Marshall	Echinocereus stoloniferus subsp. stoloniferus; Echinocereus stoloniferus subsp. tayopensis (W.T.Marshall) N.P.Taylor	Mexico (SE Sonora, Sinaloa)
Reichenbachii N.P.Taylor (1985)		Echinocereus subinermis Salm-Dyck ex Scheer	Echinocereus subinermis subsp. ochoterenae (J.G.Ortega) N.P.Taylor; Echinocereus subinermis subsp. subinermis	Mexico (Sonora, Sinaloa, SW Chihuahua, Durango)
Reichenbachii N.P.Taylor (1985)		Echinocereus websterianus G.E.Linds.		Mexico (Sonora: Island San Pedro Nolasco)
Triglochidiata Bravo 1973		Echinocereus acifer (Otto ex Salm-Dyck) Jacobi		Mexico
Triglochidiata Bravo 1973		Echinocereus arizonicus Rose ex Orcutt	Echinocereus arizonicus subsp. arizonicus; Echinocereus arizonicus subsp. matudae (Bravo) Rutow; Echinocereus arizonicus subsp. nigrihorridispinus W.Blum & Rutow	Arizona, New Mexico, Mexico
Triglochidiata Bravo 1973		Echinocereus bakeri W.Blum, Oldach & J.Oldach		Arizona, Nevada, Utah
Triglochidiata Bravo 1973		Echinocereus coccineus Engelm.	Echinocereus coccineus subsp. coccineus; Echinocereus coccineus subsp. paucispinus (Engelm.) W.Blum, Mich.Lange & Rutow; Echinocereus coccineus subsp. rosei (Wooton & Standl.) W.Blum & Rutow	New Mexico and Mexico (Sonora, Sinaloa, Chihuahua)
Triglochidiata Bravo 1973		Echinocereus gurneyi (L.D.Benson) W.Blum, Oldach & J.Oldach		Texas.
Triglochidiata Bravo 1973		Echinocereus huitcholensis (F.A.C.Weber) M.Gürke		Mexico (SE. Sinaloa to NW. Jalisco)
Triglochidiata Bravo 1973		Echinocereus marksianus Fritz Schwarz ex Backeb.		Mexico (San Luis Potosí)
Triglochidiata Bravo 1973		Echinocereus ortegae Rose	Echinocereus ortegae subsp. koehresianus (G.Frank) W.Rischer & G.Frank; Echinocereus ortegae subsp. ortegae	Mexico
Triglochidiata Bravo 1973		Echinocereus pacificus (Engelm.) Britton & Rose	Echinocereus pacificus subsp. mombergerianus (G.Frank) W.Blum, W.Rischer & Rutow; Echinocereus pacificus subsp. pacificus	Mexico (Baja California)
Triglochidiata Bravo 1973		Echinocereus polyacanthus Engelm.		Mexico (Chihuahua to Jalisco).
Triglochidiata Bravo 1973		Echinocereus salm-dyckianus Scheer		Mexico (E. Sonora to W. Chihuahua)
Triglochidiata Bravo 1973		Echinocereus santaritensis W.Blum & Rutow	Echinocereus santaritensis subsp. bacanorensis (W.Rischer & Trocha) W.Rischer & D.Felix; Echinocereus santaritensis subsp. santaritensis	Arizona to New Mexico and Mexico (Sonora, Chihuahua)
Triglochidiata Bravo 1973		Echinocereus scheeri (Salm-Dyck) Scheer	Echinocereus scheeri subsp. gentryi (Clover) N.P.Taylor; Echinocereus scheeri subsp. scheeri	Mexico (E. Sonora to W. Durango)
Triglochidiata Bravo 1973		Echinocereus triglochidiatus Engelm.	Echinocereus triglochidiatus subsp. mojavensis (Engelm. & J.M.Bigelow) W.Blum & Mich.Lange; Echinocereus triglochidiatus subsp. triglochidiatus	Colorado to New Mexico and NW. Mexico.
Triglochidiata Bravo 1973		Echinocereus yavapaiensis M.A.Baker		Arizona
Wilcoxia (Britton & Rose) N.P.Taylor (1985)		Echinocereus kroenleinii (Mich.Lange) W.Blum & Waldeis		Mexico (Coahuila)
Wilcoxia (Britton & Rose) N.P.Taylor (1985)		Echinocereus leucanthus N.P.Taylor		Mexico (NW. Sonora, NW. Sinaloa)
Wilcoxia (Britton & Rose) N.P.Taylor (1985)		Echinocereus poselgeri Lem.		Texas to NE. Mexico.
Wilcoxia (Britton & Rose) N.P.Taylor (1985)		Echinocereus schmollii (Weing.) N.P.Taylor		Mexico (SE. Querétaro to Hidalgo)
Wilcoxia (Britton & Rose) N.P.Taylor (1985)		Echinocereus waldeisii Haugg		Mexico (San Luis Potosí)

== Natural hybrids ==
Image	Scientific name	Subspecies	Distribution
	Echinocereus × kunzei Gürke ( E. coccineus × E. dasyacanthus.)		New Mexico
	Echinocereus × neomexicanus Standl. (E. chloranthus × E. coccineus subsp. rosei. )		Mexico (Chihuahua)
	Echinocereus × roetteri (Engelm.) Engelm. (E. coccineus × E. dasyacanthus)	Echinocereus ×roetteri var. lloydii (Britton & Rose) Backeb.; Echinocereus ×roetteri var. neomexicanus (J.M.Coult.) A.D.Zimmerman	New Mexico to SW. Texas and Mexico (Chihuahua)

=== Formerly placed here ===
- Echinopsis candicans (Gillies ex Salm-Dyck) F.A.C.Weber ex D.R.Hunt (as E. candicans (Gillies ex Salm-Dyck) Rümpler)
