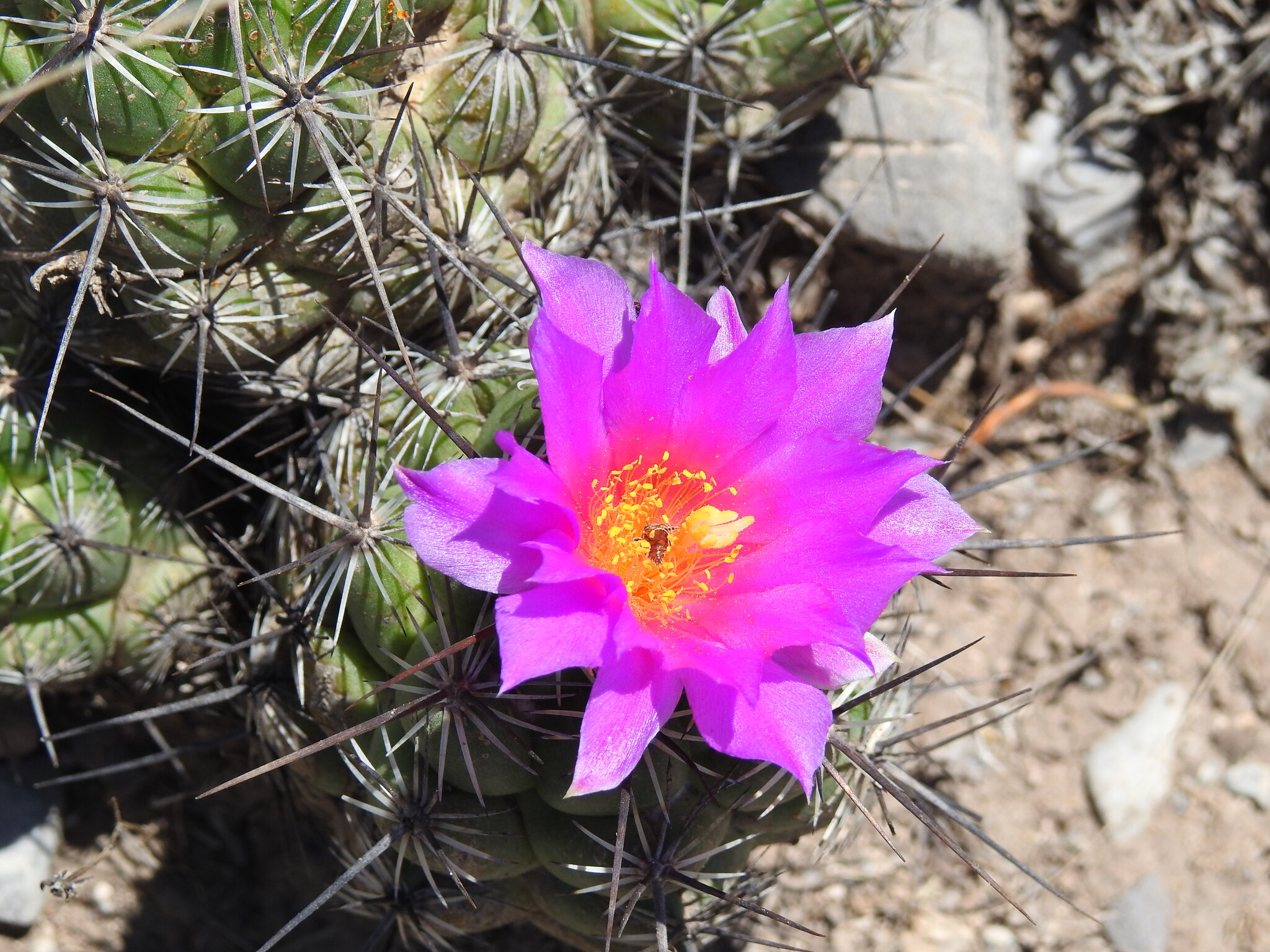
- Neolloydia conoidea

Scientific classification
- Kingdom: Plantae
- Clade: Tracheophytes
- Clade: Angiosperms
- Clade: Eudicots
- Order: Caryophyllales
- Family: Cactaceae
- Subfamily: Cactoideae
- Tribe: Cacteae
- Genus: Neolloydia; Britton & Rose

Type species
- Neolloydia conoidea

= Neolloydia =

Genus of cacti

Neolloydia is a genus of cacti.

== Description ==
These small, low-growing cacti are usually solitary or form loose cushions. They have spherical to cylindrical shoots that are typically yellowish-green with whitish, woolly tips. The plants measure 3 to 6 centimeters in diameter and 5 to 24 centimeters in height. They have weakly developed or absent ribs. Distinctive conical warts, 3 to 10 millimeters long and 6 to 10 millimeters wide, are prominent on the surface. The areoles are dimorphic, about 3 to 5 millimeters in diameter, spaced 8 to 12 millimeters apart, with a furrow. Central spines, which may be absent, are 1 to 2 (sometimes up to 6) in number, variable in color from black to reddish-brown, straight, and erect, measuring 5 to 25 millimeters. Radial spines are straight, white or whitish with dark tips, and 5 to 7 millimeters long. The flowers are small, funnel-shaped, and typically purple-red. They are 2 to 3 centimeters long and 4 to 6 centimeters in diameter, with a smooth (glabrous) calyx. Fruits are round, green to greenish-brown, smooth, do not open, and measure 4 to 5 millimeters across. They contain black, pear-shaped, warty seeds.

== Distribution ==
Neolloydia is native to northern Mexico, with its range from West Texas south through the Chihuahuan Desert to Querétaro.

== Taxonomy ==
The genus was first erected by Britton and Rose in 1922. The name honors American botanist Francis Ernest Lloyd. Edward F. Anderson regarded Neolloydia as being poorly defined, with the result that species that had at times been included in Neolloydia were afterwards placed in multiple genera, including Coryphantha, Echinomastus, Escobaria, Mammillaria, Sclerocactus, Thelocactus and Turbinicarpus. In his 2001 book, Anderson firmly placed only one species in the genus, Neolloydia conoidea, with another, Neolloydia matehualensis, being regarded as only a variant of N. conoidea.

=== Species ===
As of October 2025, Plants of the World Online accepts the following species.

| Image | Scientific name | Distribution |
|---|---|---|
| | Neolloydia conoidea (DC.) Britton & Rose | southern United States to central Mexico |
| | Neolloydia inexpectata D.Donati | Mexico (Tamaulipas) |
| | Neolloydia matehualensis Backeb. | Mexico (San Luis Potosí) |

Species formerly placed in Neolloydia include:

- Neolloydia clavata → Coryphantha clavata
- Neolloydia horripila → Kadenicarpus horripilus
- Neolloydia johnsonii → Sclerocactus johnsonii
- Neolloydia laui → Turbinicarpus laui
- Neolloydia lophophoroides → Turbinicarpus lophophoroides
- Neolloydia macdowellii → Thelocactus macdowellii
- Neolloydia mandragora → Rapicactus mandragora
- Neolloydia mariposensis → Sclerocactus mariposensis
- Neolloydia odorata → Cumarinia odorata
- Neolloydia pilispina → Mammillaria pilispina
- Neolloydia roseana → Acharagma roseanum
- Neolloydia subterranea → Rapicactus subterraneus
- Neolloydia texensis → Cochemiea conoidea
- Neolloydia zaragosae → Rapicactus zaragosae
