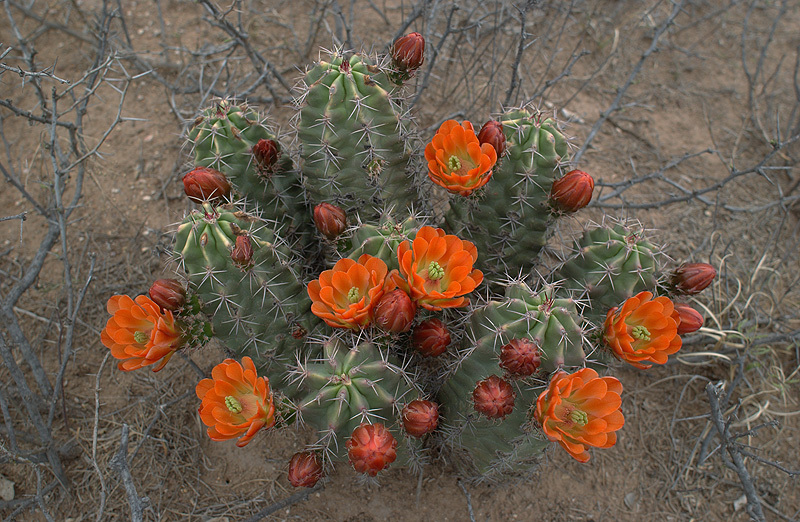

Scientific classification
- Kingdom: Plantae
- Clade: Tracheophytes
- Clade: Angiosperms
- Clade: Eudicots
- Order: Caryophyllales
- Family: Cactaceae
- Subfamily: Cactoideae
- Genus: Echinocereus
- Species: E. gurneyi

Binomial name
- Echinocereus gurneyi L.D.Benson) W.Blum, Oldach & J.Oldach 2014

Synonyms
- Echinocereus coccineus var. gurneyi (L.D.Benson) K.D.Heil & S.Brack 1988; Echinocereus coccineus subsp. gurneyi (L.D.Benson) D.Felix & H.Bauer 2014; Echinocereus triglochidiatus var. gurneyi L.D.Benson 1969

= Echinocereus gurneyi =

Species of cactus

Echinocereus gurneyi is a species of cactus native to Texas.

== Description ==
Echinocereus gurneyi forms small clumps consisting of 10 or more stems. The dark green plant body is ovate to cylindrical and reaches heights of up to 20–35 cm (7.9–13.8 in) with a diameter of 5 to 10 cm (2.0 to 3.9 in). The 8 to 12 ribs often form warts. The spines are yellow brown and difficult to distinguish between radial and central spines. The areoles have 1-2 central spines, have an angular cross section and are up to 7.5 cm (3.0 in) long and 5-12 radial spines that are the same length. The broad, funnel-shaped, dioecious, orange-red to salmon flowers appear below the shoot tip. They have a diameter of 8 cm (3.1 in).

== Distribution ==
This species is found growing rocky hillsides and limestone rock in pine oak and juniper woodlands of New Mexico and Texas in the United States and Chihuahua, Mexico at elevations between 1200 and 1500 meters. Plants are found growing along Dasylirion leiophyllum, Pelecyphora sneedii subsp. sneedii, Echinocereus viridiflorus var. cylindricus, and Agave parryi subsp. neomexicana.

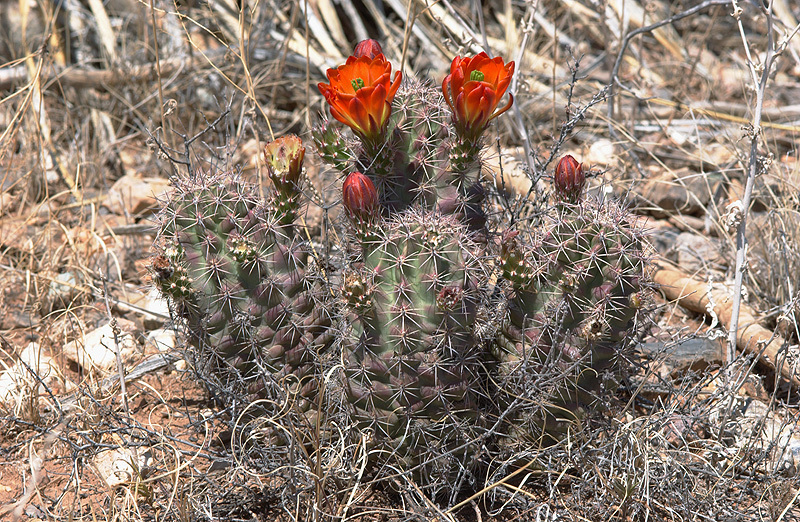
Habitat in Marathon, Texas

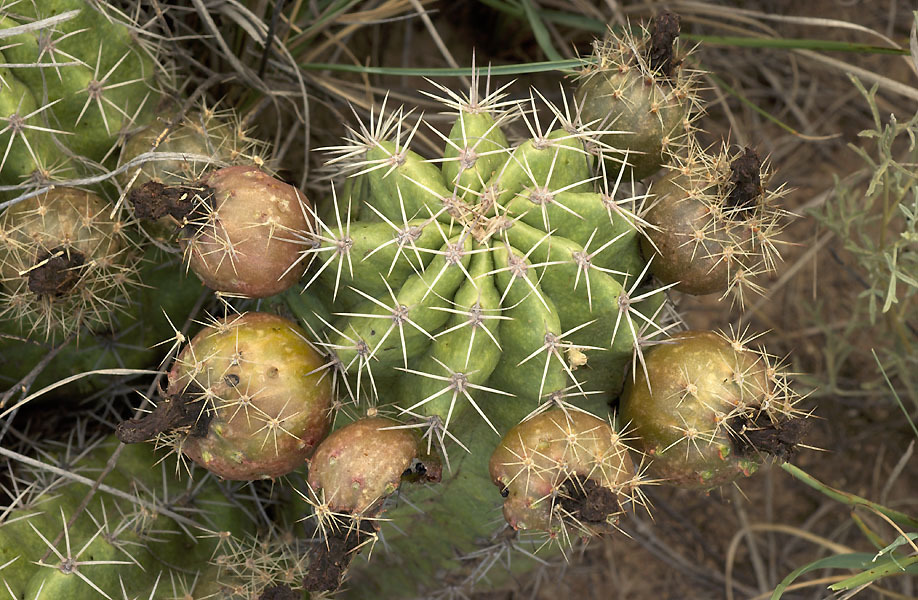
Plant fruiting in Marathon, Texas
