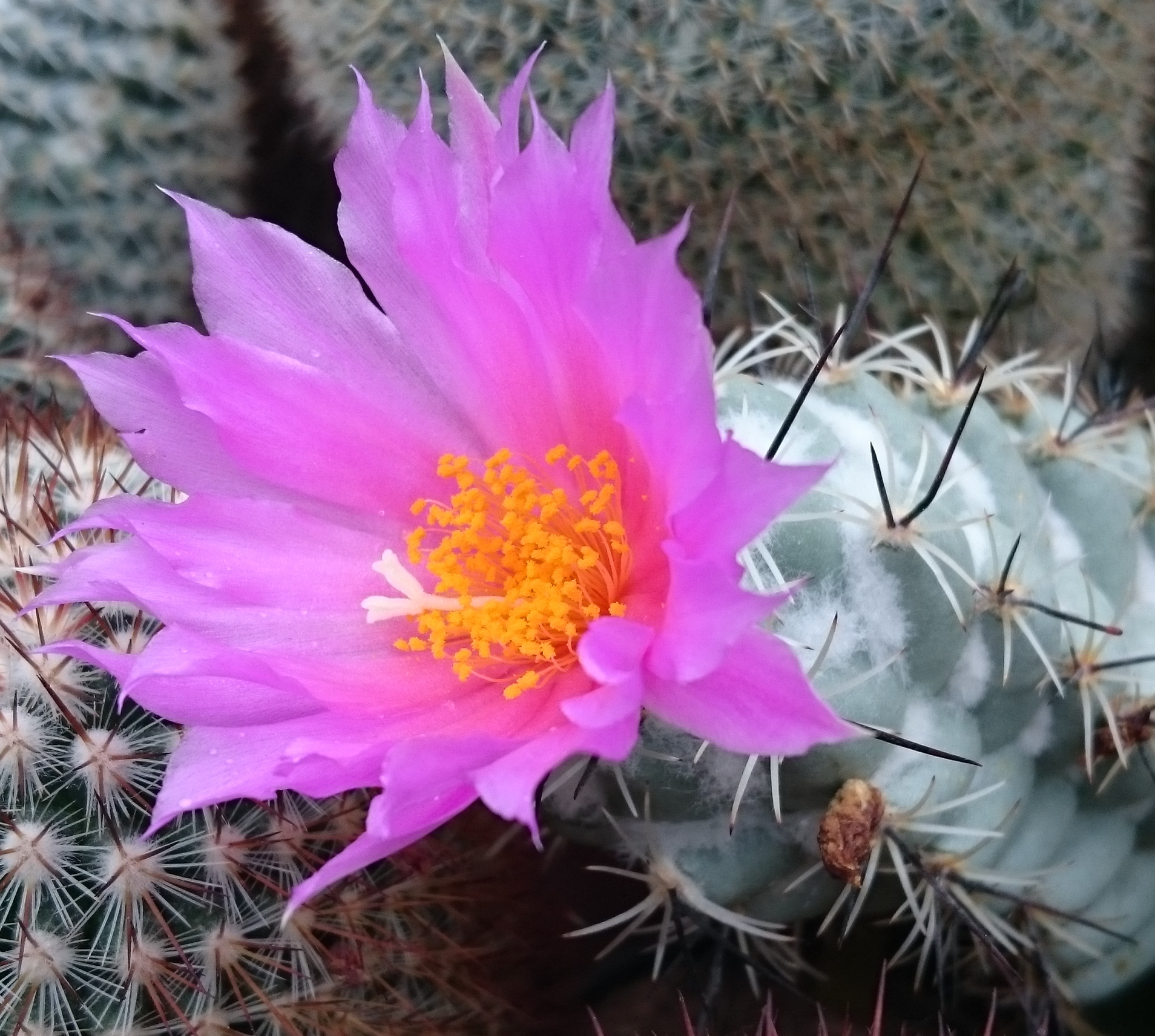

Conservation status
- Least Concern (IUCN 3.1)

Scientific classification
- Kingdom: Plantae
- Clade: Tracheophytes
- Clade: Angiosperms
- Clade: Eudicots
- Order: Caryophyllales
- Family: Cactaceae
- Subfamily: Cactoideae
- Genus: Neolloydia
- Species: N. conoidea

Binomial name
- Neolloydia conoidea (DC.) Britton & Rose

Synonyms
- Cactus conoideus (DC.) Kuntze; Cochemiea conoidea (DC.) P.B.Breslin & Majure; Echinocactus conoideus (DC.) Poselger; Mammillaria ceratites Quehl; Mammillaria conoidea DC.; Mammillaria grandiflora Otto ex Pfeiff.; Neolloydia ceratites (Quehl) Britton & Rose; Neolloydia texensis Britton & Rose

= Neolloydia conoidea =

Species of cactus

Neolloydia conoidea, common name Texas cone cactus or Chihuahuan beehive, is a species of cactus native to southern United States to central Mexico.

== Description ==
Neolloydia conoidea is an solitary, unbranched cylindrical cactus up to 24 cm (9.6 inches) tall and up to 8 cm (3.2 inches) in diameter. The somewhat yellowish-green to green shoots, usually with whitish woolly tips, are spherical to cylindrical, with diameters of 3 to 6 centimeters and heights of 5 to 24 centimeters. Ribs are weakly defined or absent. The cone-shaped warts, 3 to 10 millimeters long and 6 to 10 millimeters wide, are prominent. Dimorphic areoles, 3 to 5 millimeters in size, are spaced 8 to 12 millimeters apart and have an areolar groove. The single central spine, sometimes absent, is black to reddish-brown, straight, and protruding, measuring 5 to 25 millimeters long. There are 15 to 16 radial spines.

The funnel-shaped flowers are purple-red, 2 to 3 centimeters long, and 4 to 6 centimeters in diameter. Outer tepals of the flowers are whitish with green midveins; inner tepals bright pink-rose to magenta. Fruits are pale yellow-olive with black seeds.

== Distribution ==
Neolloydia conoidea is found from western Texas and to the Mexican states of Coahuila, Durango, Nuevo León, San Luis Potosí, Tamaulipas, and Zacatecas growing at elevations of 550 to 2400 meters. It is a part of the Chihuahuan Desert desert scrub and the Tamaulipan thorn scrub growing in limestone. The plants are found growing among Echinocereus longisetus subsp. delaetii , Lophophora williamsii, Mammillaria pottsii, Mammillaria lasiacantha, Pelecyphora strobiliformis, Echinocactus platyacanthus, Ferocactus pilosus, Stenocactus crispatus, Myrtillocactus geometrizans, Thelocactus hexaedrophorus, Coryphantha erecta, Coryphantha octacantha, Stenocereus dumortieri, Cylindropuntia tunicata, Cylindropuntia imbricata, Opuntia streptacantha, Agave salmiana, Agave lechuguilla, Agave stricta, Euphorbia antisyphilitica, Hechtia glomerata, and Yucca filifera.

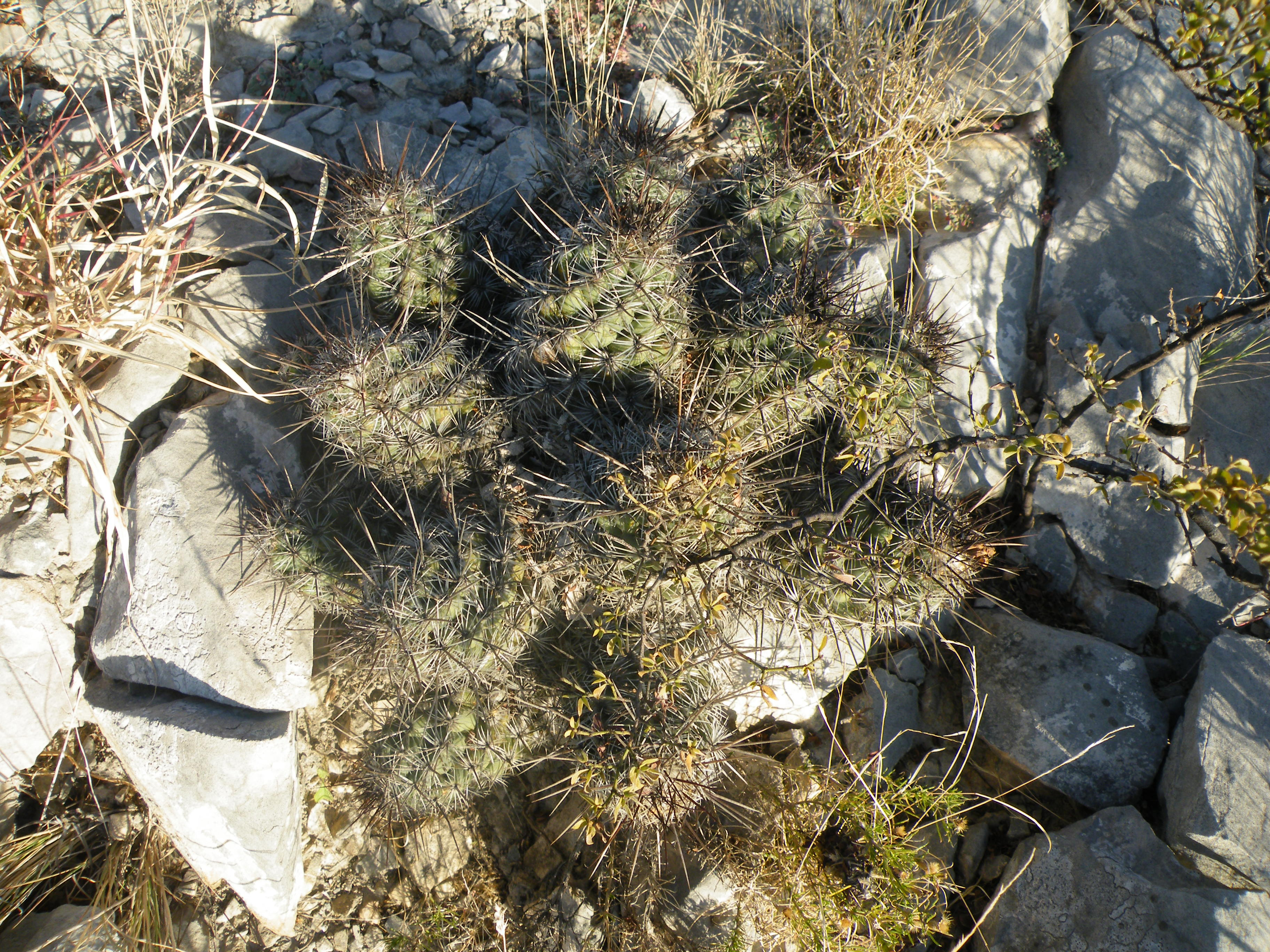
Plant growing in Mina, Nuevo Leon

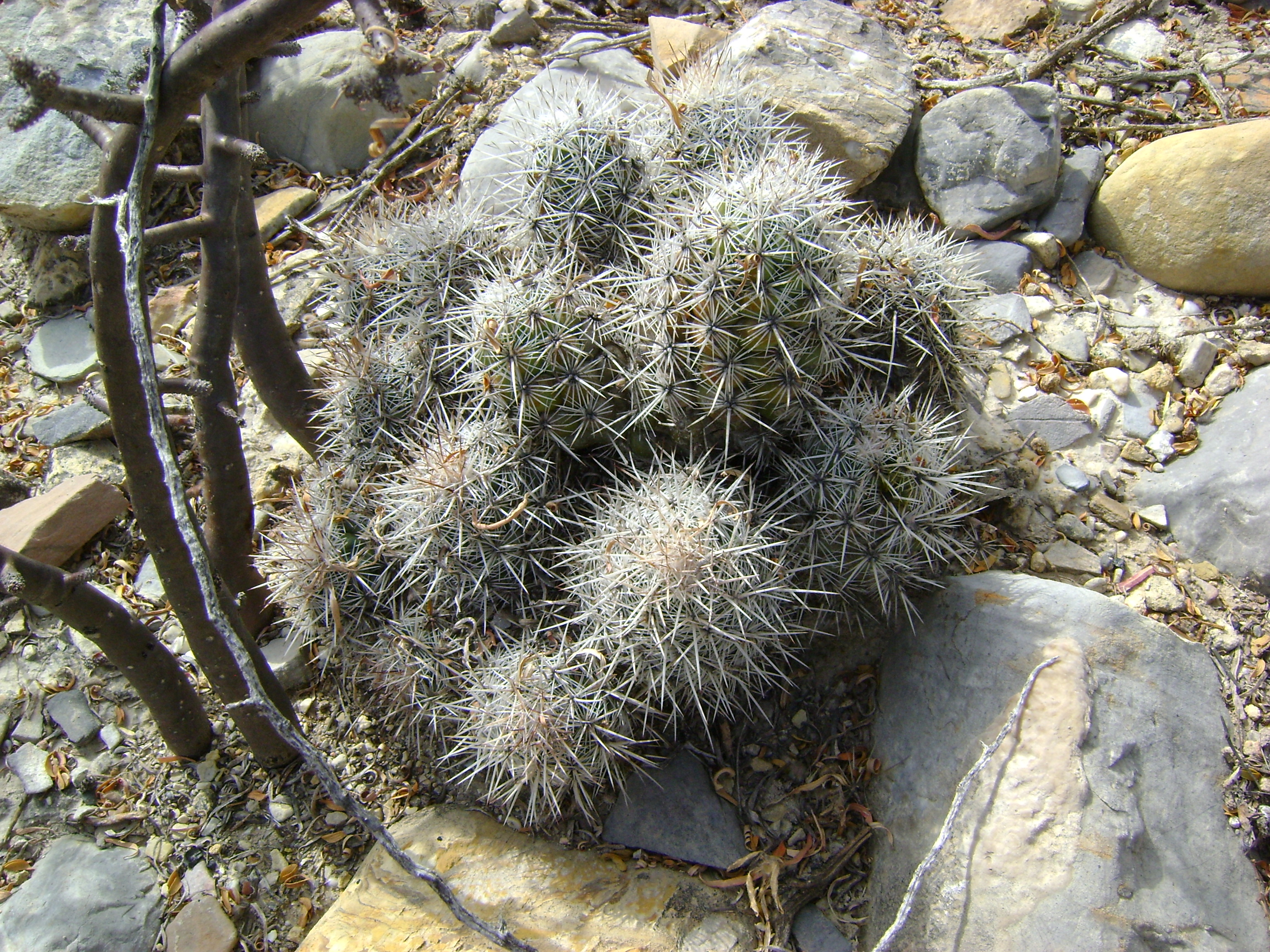
Plant growing in Parras De La Fuente, Coahuila

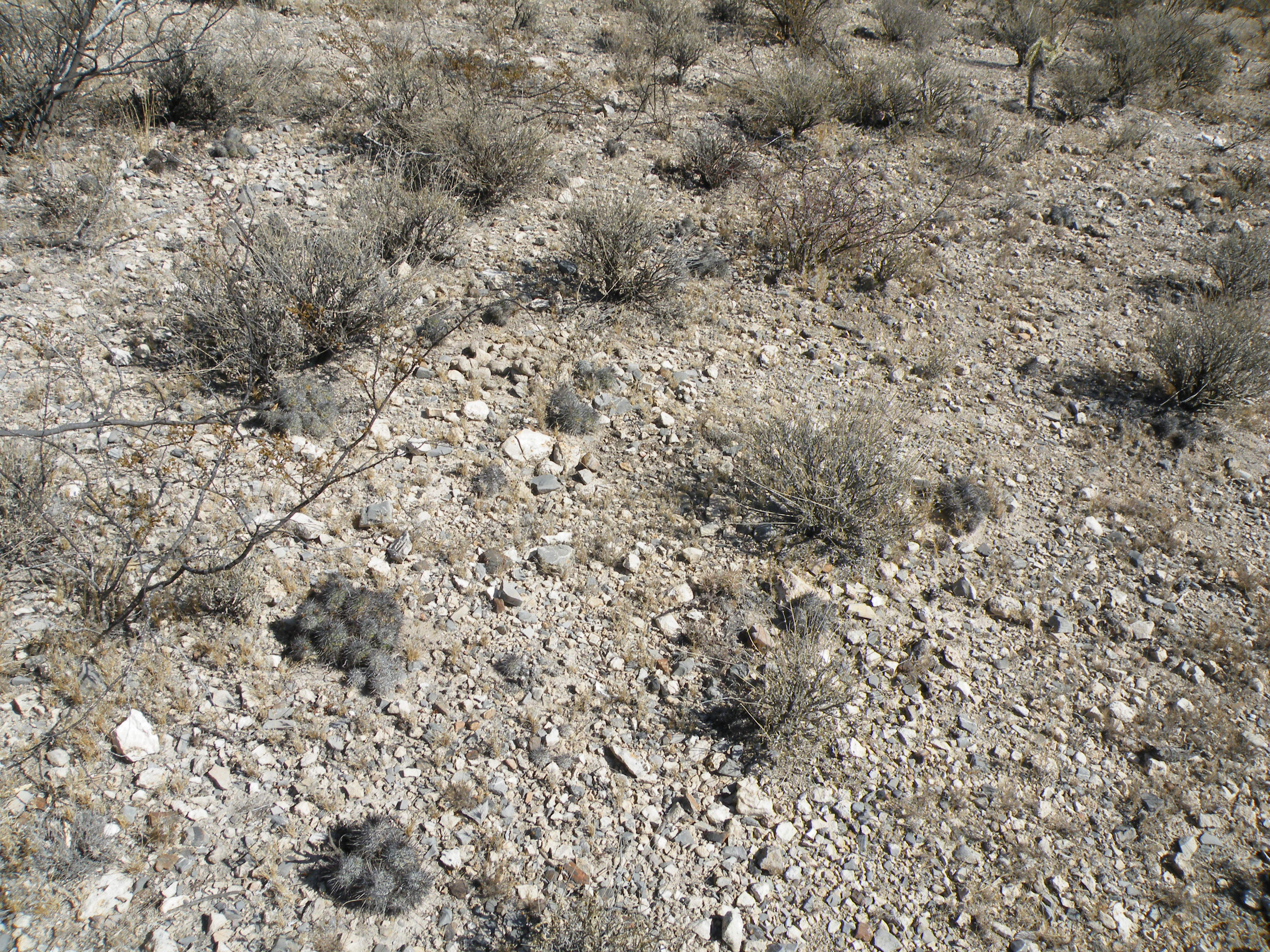
Habitat in Northwest Vanegas, San Luis Potosi

== Taxonomy ==
First described as Mammillaria conoidea by Augustin-Pyrame de Candolle in 1828, the species name "conoidea" is Latin for "conical," referring to the shape of the shoots. Peter B. Breslin and Lucas C. Majure reclassified it under the genus Cochemiea in 2021.
