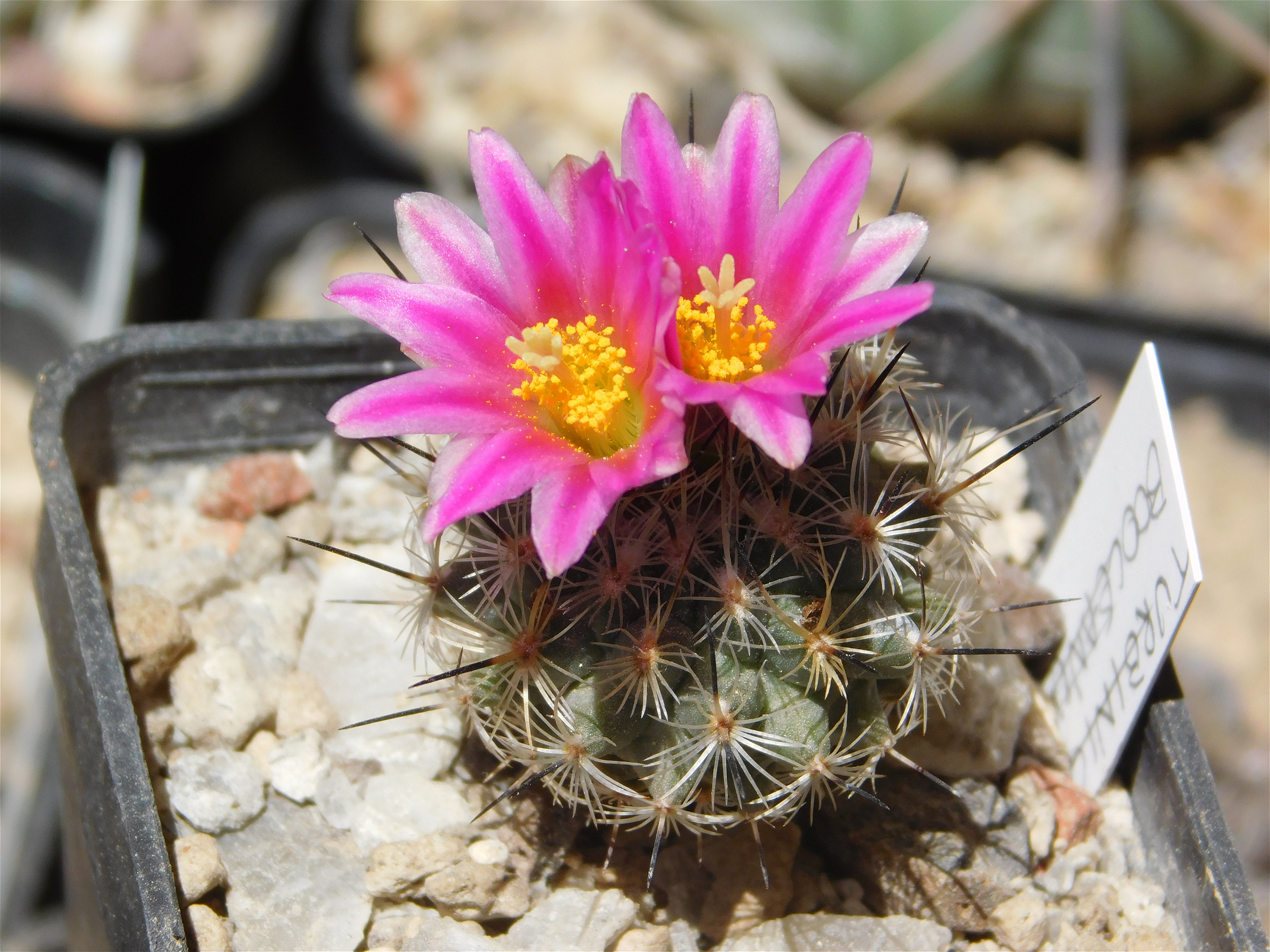

Scientific classification
- Kingdom: Plantae
- Clade: Embryophytes
- Clade: Tracheophytes
- Clade: Angiosperms
- Clade: Eudicots
- Order: Caryophyllales
- Family: Cactaceae
- Subfamily: Cactoideae
- Genus: Rapicactus
- Species: R. booleanus

Binomial name
- Rapicactus booleanus (G.S.Hinton) D.Donati 2003

Synonyms
- Neolloydia booleana (G.S.Hinton) Doweld 2000; Rapicactus subterraneus subsp. booleanus (G.S.Hinton) Lüthy 2003; Turbinicarpus booleanus G.S.Hinton 1996; Turbinicarpus mandragora subsp. booleanus (G.S.Hinton) Lüthy 1999; Turbinicarpus subterraneus subsp. booleanus (G.S.Hinton) Zachar 2004

= Rapicactus booleanus =

Species of flowering plant

Rapicactus booleanus is a species of plant in the family Cactaceae.

== Description ==
Rapicactus booleanus grows solitarily with a tuberous root connected to the stem by a narrow neck 1–5 cm (0.39–1.97 in) long. The grey-green stems are spherical, obovate to turbinate, narrowing at the collar, and measure 2.5–4.5 cm (0.98–1.77 in) tall and 2.5–5.5 cm (0.98–2.17 in) in diameter. The hard, spirally arranged tubercles are closely set, 4-angled, rhomboid, somewhat flattened and almost truncated above, and somewhat horny or keeled below. There are 2 erect central spines, whitish with dark brown tips, measuring 12–21 mm (0.47–0.83 in) long. Around 18-20 radial spines are white and measure 3–17 mm (0.12–0.67 in) long. Flowers are pale to dark magenta with darker midstripes, blooming on summer days, and are 2 cm (0.79 in) long and 2.5 cm (0.98 in) in diameter. The fruits are dark green to purple, measure 7 mm (0.28 in) long and 6 mm (0.24 in) in diameter, and split open when ripe.

== Distribution ==
Plants are found growing in gypsum outcrops near San Roberto, Nuevo León and in general Mexico.
