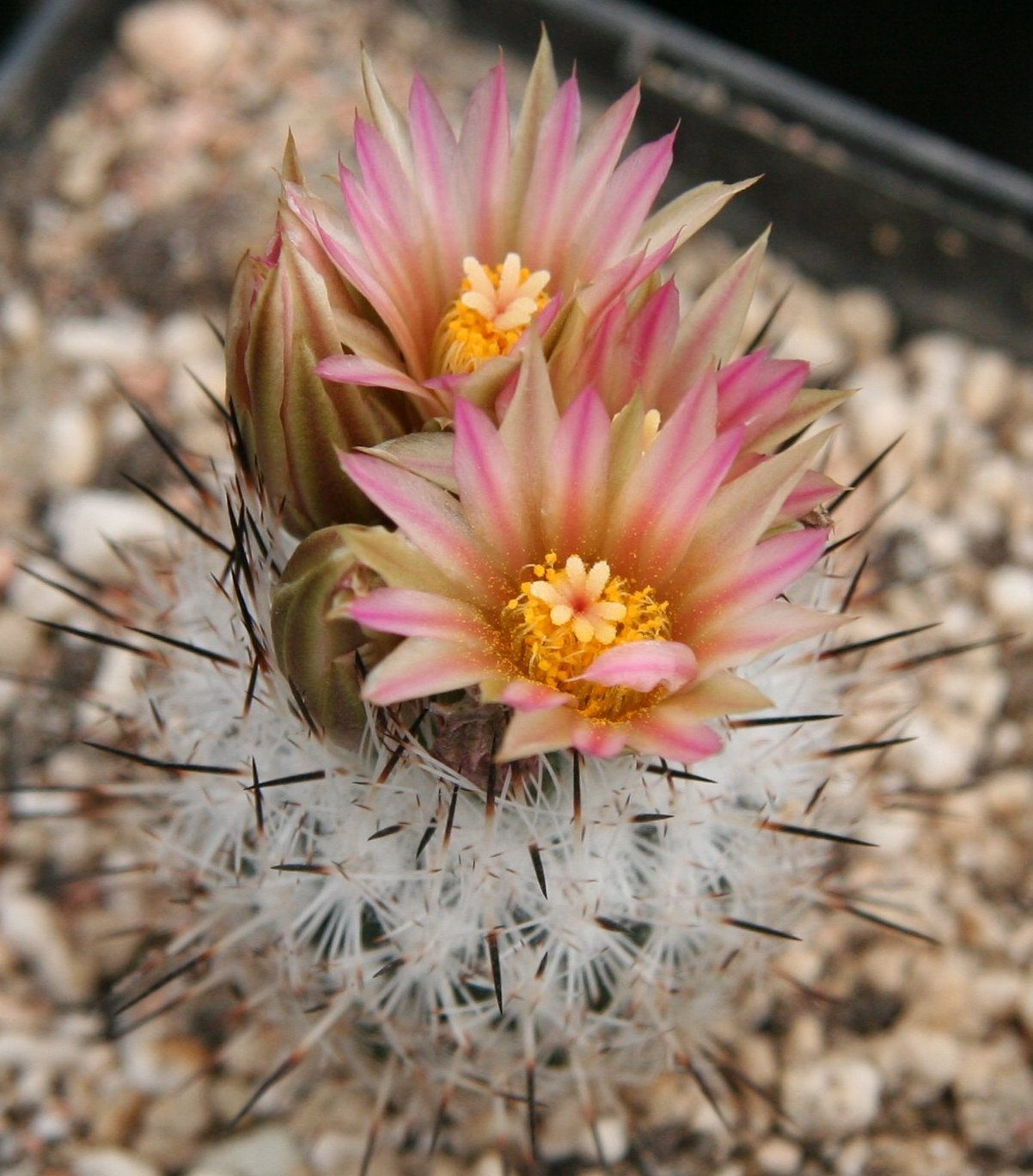

Conservation status
- Vulnerable (IUCN 3.1)
- CITES Appendix I

Scientific classification
- Kingdom: Plantae
- Clade: Tracheophytes
- Clade: Angiosperms
- Clade: Eudicots
- Order: Caryophyllales
- Family: Cactaceae
- Subfamily: Cactoideae
- Genus: Rapicactus
- Species: R. zaragosae

Binomial name
- Rapicactus zaragosae (Glass & R.A.Foster) D.Donati

Synonyms
- Gymnocactus subterraneus var. zaragosae Glass & R.A.Foster; Neolloydia subterranea subsp. zaragosae (Glass & R.A.Foster) Doweld; Neolloydia subterranea var. zaragosae (Glass & R.A.Foster) E.F.Anderson; Neolloydia zaragosae (Glass & R.A.Foster) Doweld; Pediocactus subterraneus var. zaragosae (Glass & R.A.Foster) Halda; Rapicactus subterraneus subsp. zaragosae (Glass & R.A.Foster) Lüthy; Thelocactus subterraneus var. zaragosae (Glass & R.A.Foster) Bravo; Turbinicarpus beguinii subsp. zaragosae (Glass & R.A.Foster) D.R.Hunt; Turbinicarpus mandragora subsp. zaragosae (Glass & R.A.Foster) Lüthy; Turbinicarpus subterraneus subsp. zaragosae (Glass & R.A.Foster) Zachar; Turbinicarpus subterraneus var. zaragosae (Glass & R.A.Foster) A.D.Zimmerman; Turbinicarpus zaragosae (Glass & R.A.Foster) Glass & A.Hofer

= Rapicactus zaragosae =

Species of cactus

Rapicactus zaragosae, synonym Turbinicarpus zaragosae, is a species of plant in the family Cactaceae. It is endemic to Mexico. Its natural habitat is hot deserts. It is threatened by habitat destruction.

== Description ==
Rapicactus zaragosae is a solitary, club-shaped cactus with stems that are globular to cylindrical, reaching up to 150 mm in height and 50 mm in width. The stems are greenish-blue with a woolly apex, and the areoles in the flowering area are very woolly. The tubercles of this cactus are pyramidal or conical. It has 21-25 radial spines that are slightly bent backwards, thickened at the base, glassy white with a brown tip, and measure 3-6 mm in length, except for 2 or 3 bristle-like spines that can reach up to 2 cm. Additionally, there are 2 brownish-black central spines that turn grey with age, one of which is erect and darker, measuring around 15-20 mm long. The flowers of Rapicactus zaragosae are slender and funnel-shaped, ranging in color from pale yellow to violet, with a darker mid-vein. They are 18-20 mm long and 15-30 mm wide, blooming in spring to summer. The fruits are greenish-brown.

== Distribution ==
Plants are found growing on gypsum hills in the municipalities of Zaragosa and South of Aramberri in Nuevo Leon, Mexico at elevations of 1200-1700 meters. The plants are found growing with Thelocactus conothelos subsp. aurantiacus and Cochemiea conoidea.

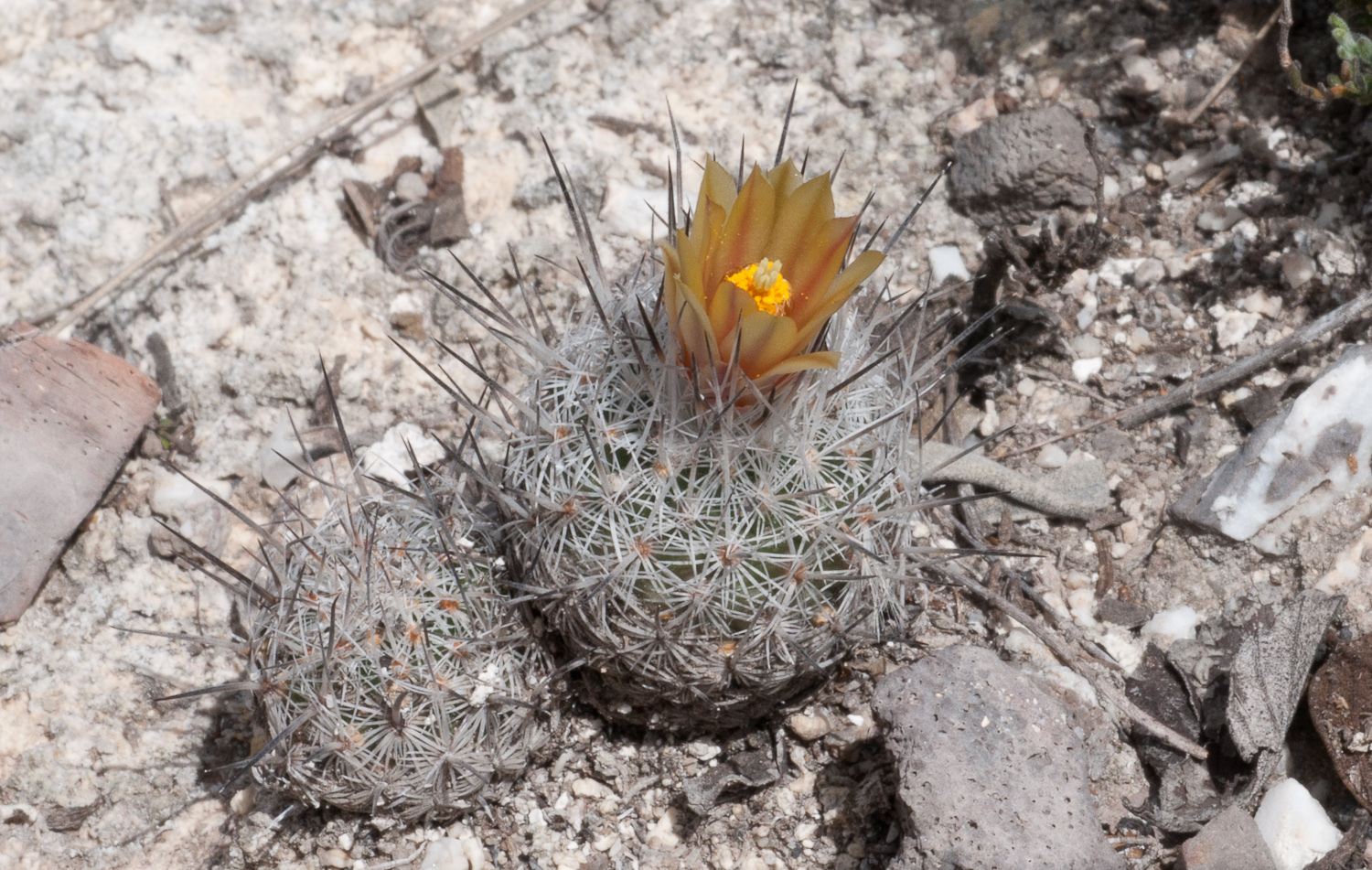
Plant growing in habitat in Zaragoza, Nuevo Leon
