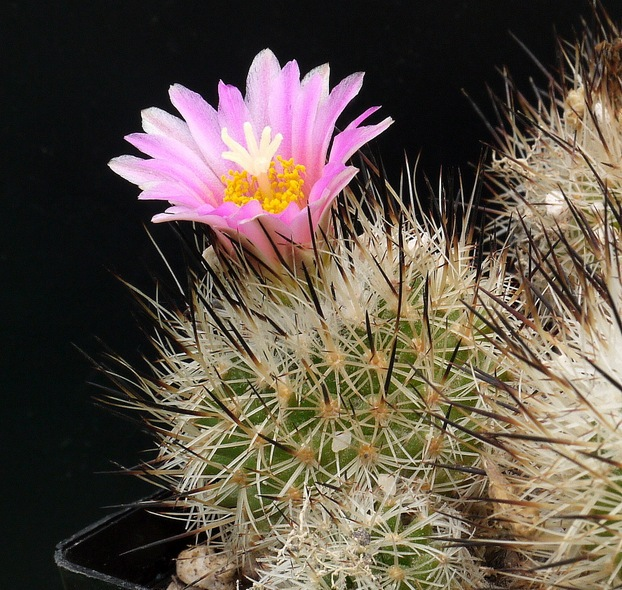

Conservation status
- Least Concern (IUCN 3.1)

Scientific classification
- Kingdom: Plantae
- Clade: Tracheophytes
- Clade: Angiosperms
- Clade: Eudicots
- Order: Caryophyllales
- Family: Cactaceae
- Subfamily: Cactoideae
- Genus: Rapicactus
- Species: R. beguinii

Binomial name
- Rapicactus beguinii (N.P.Taylor) Lüthy 2003

Synonyms
- Neolloydia glassii Doweld 2000; Thelocactus beguinii N.P.Taylor 1983; Turbinicarpus beguinii (N.P.Taylor) Mosco & Zanov. 1997; Turbinicarpus mandragora subsp. beguinii (N.P.Taylor) Lüthy 1999

= Rapicactus beguinii =

Species of cactus

Rapicactus beguinii is a species of Rapicactus found in Mexico.

== Description ==
Rapicactus beguinii is a solitary cactus characterized by its grayish to bluish-green, spherical to short cylindrical-spherical stems and fibrous roots. Stems grow 7 to 15 cm (2.8 to 5.9 in) tall and 3 to 10 cm (1.2 to 3.9 in) in diameter, with 2 to 3 mm (0.079 to 0.118 in) high conical tubercles. The plant has 2 to 3 central spines that are 12-15 mm (0.59 in) long, which are slender, straight, spreading, and white to yellowish-brown, darkening at the tips. It also possesses 9 to 27 radial spines that are 4-6 mm (0.24 in) long, which are straight, spreading, white, and also darken at their tips. Flowers are 1.2 to 1.8 cm (0.47 to 0.71 in) in diameter and range in color from whitish or yellowish to magenta. The greenish-magenta fruits are 16 to 18 mm (0.63 to 0.71 in) long.

== Subspecies ==
Accepted Subspecies:

Image	Scientific name	Description	Distribution
	Rapicactus beguinii subsp. beguinii	NE. Mexico	
	Rapicactus beguinii subsp. hintoniorum (A.Hofer) Lüthy	Mexico (Nuevo León)	

== Distribution ==
This species is found in the pine forest and steep cliffs in the Mexican states of Nuevo León, Coahuila, Zacatecas, San Luis Potosí, and Tamaulipas at elevations between 1900 and 2100 meters.

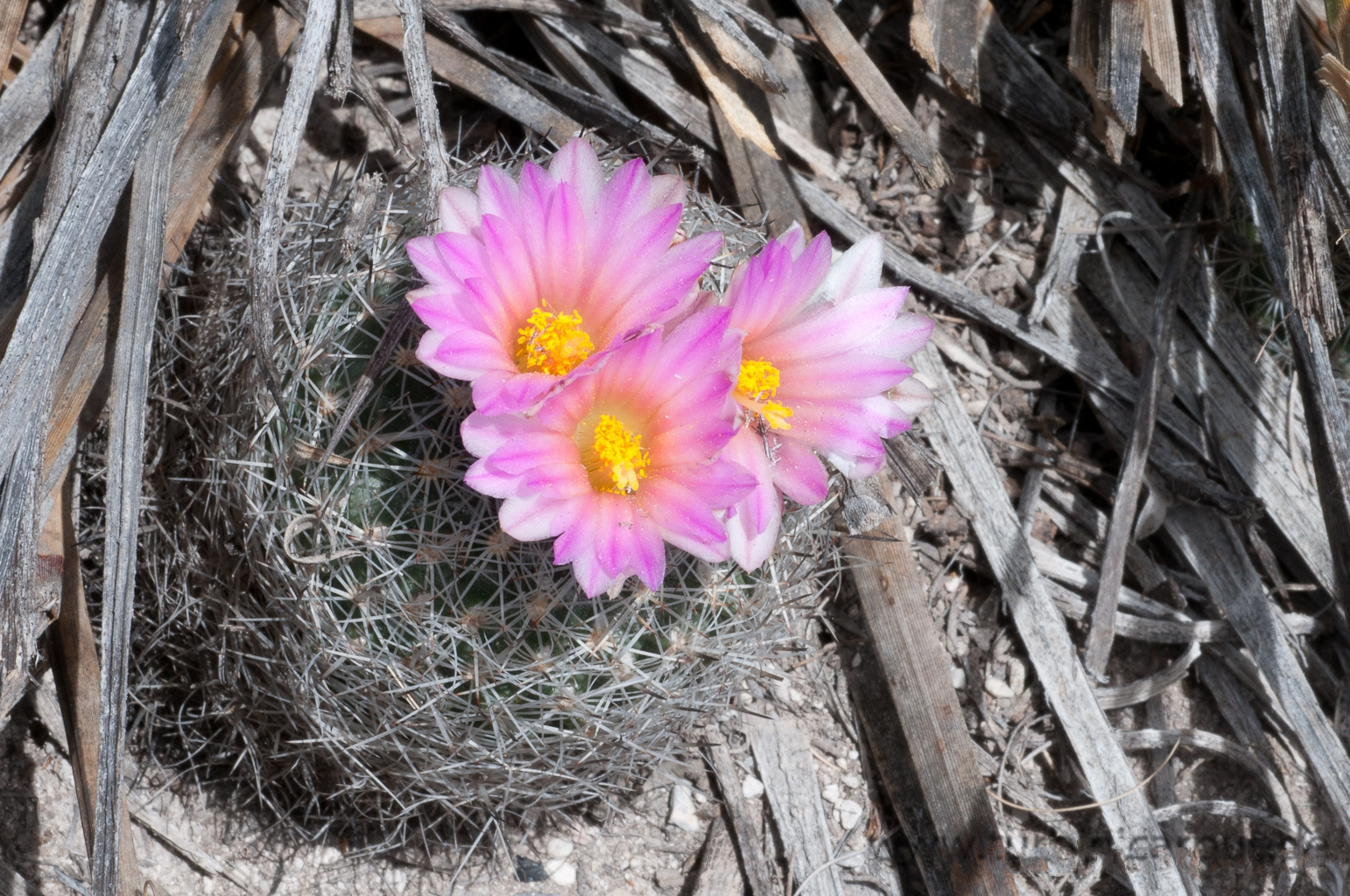
Habitat in Coahuila, Mexico

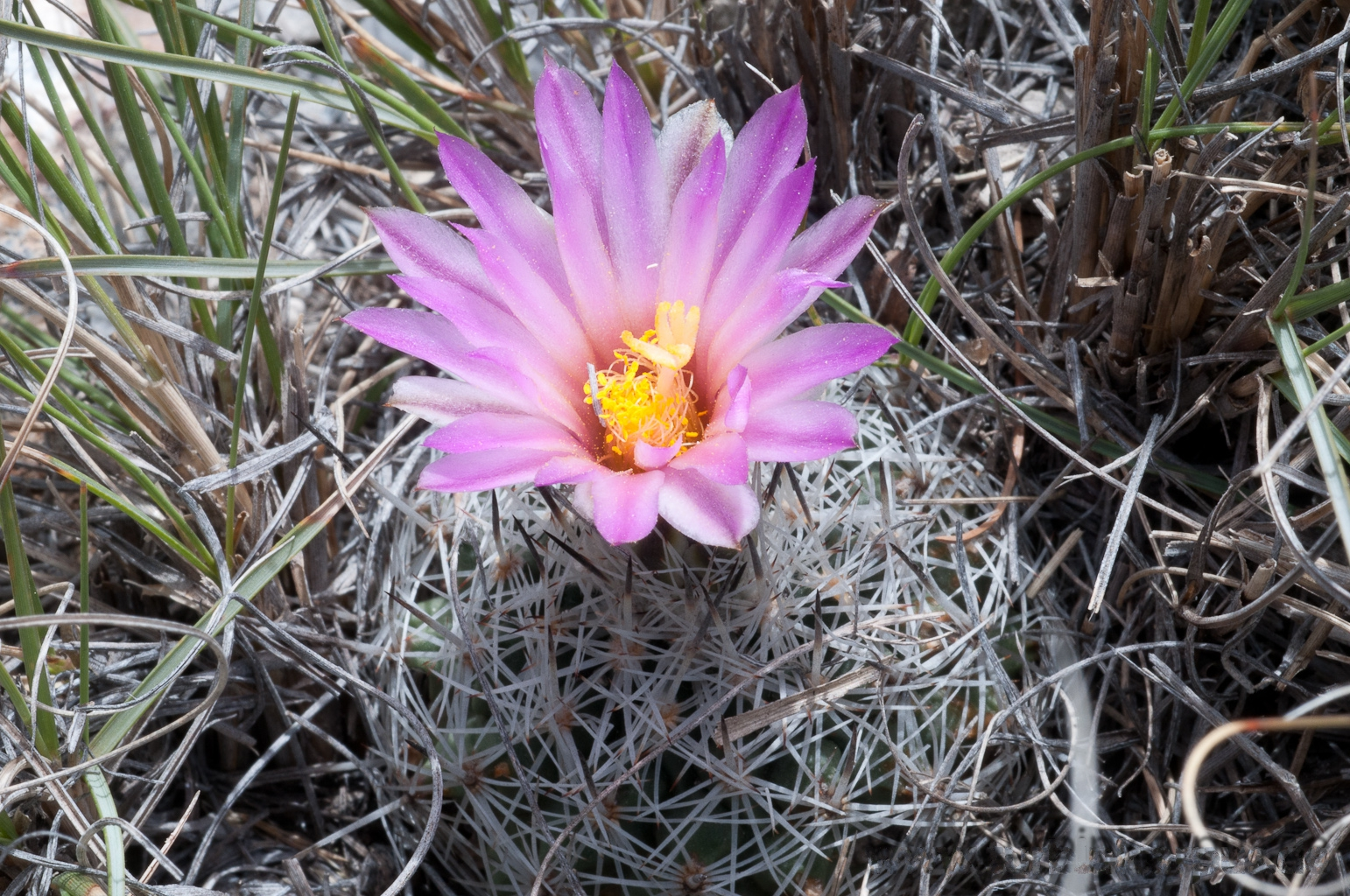
Plant blooming in habitat

== Taxonomy ==
First described as Thelocactus beguinii by Nigel Paul Taylor in 1983 who named it after Abbé Beguin of Brignoles. It was moved to the genus Rapicactus by Jonas M. Lüthy in 2003.
