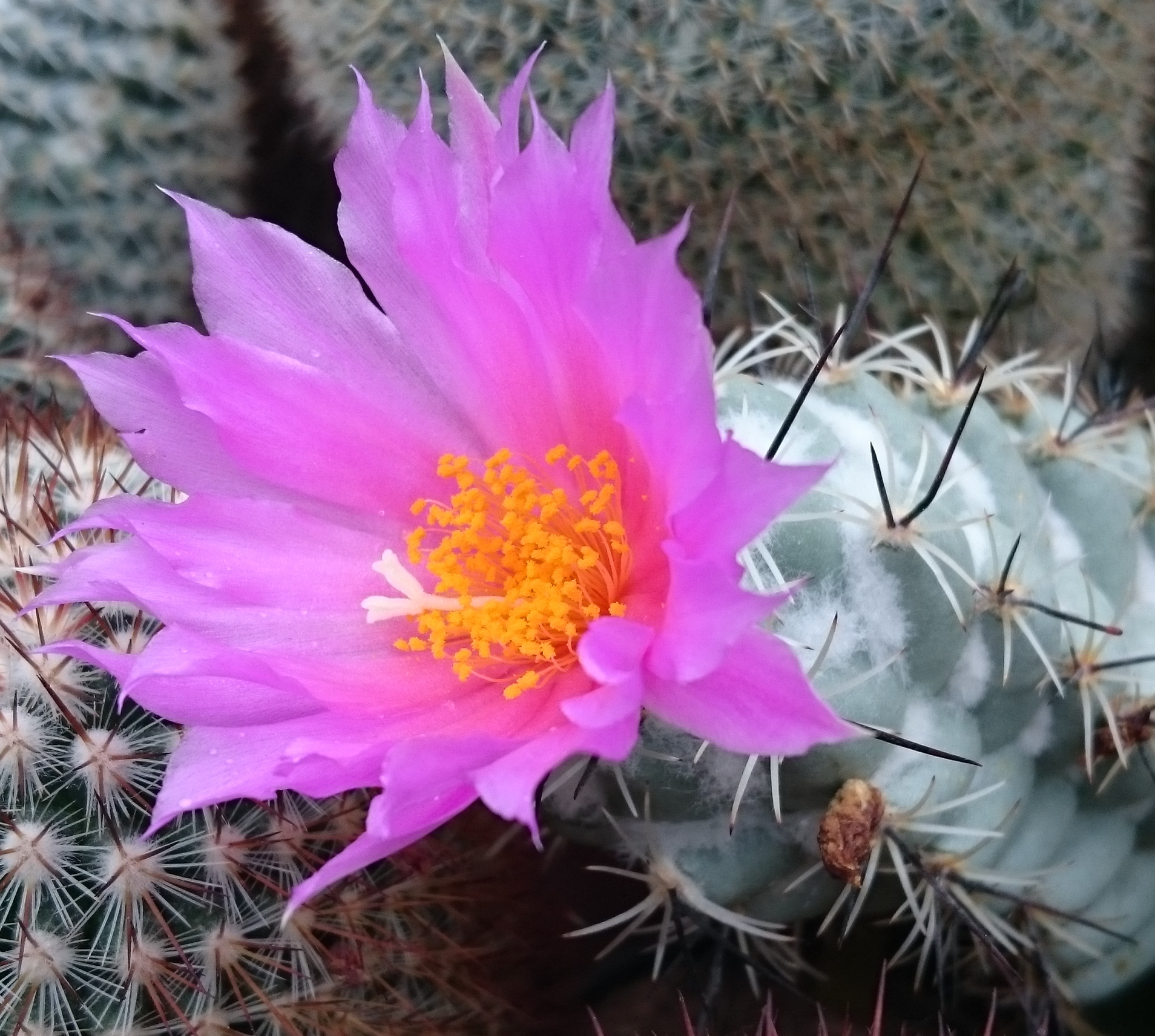
- Neolloydia matehualensis

Scientific classification
- Kingdom: Plantae
- Clade: Embryophytes
- Clade: Tracheophytes
- Clade: Spermatophytes
- Clade: Angiosperms
- Clade: Eudicots
- Order: Caryophyllales
- Family: Cactaceae
- Subfamily: Cactoideae
- Genus: Neolloydia
- Species: N. matehualensis

Binomial name
- Neolloydia matehualensis Backeb.

Synonyms
- Neolloydia conoidea var. matehualensis (Backeb.) Kladiwa & Fittkau, 1971; Cochemiea matehualensis (Backeb.) M.H.J.van der Meer, 2023

= Neolloydia matehualensis =

Species of cacti

Neolloydia matehualensis is a species of Neolloydia found in Mexico.

== Description ==
This plant typically grows either alone or in loose clusters. Its greenish-white stems are usually spherical to cylindrical in shape, often featuring whitish, woolly tips and measure 5–24 cm tall and 3–6 cm in diameter. The plant has few or no prominent ribs, but it does have distinct, conical warts. The stems are covered with spirally arranged conical tubercles and contain no milky sap (latex).It usually has two central spines that are straight, black to reddish-brown in color, and slightly sticking out, measuring between 5 and 25 millimeters in length. Additionally, there are ten radial spines. Plants bloom with funnel-shaped flowers that are purplish-pink, measuring 2 to 3 centimeters in length and 4 to 6 centimeters across. Inside are small black seeds.

== Distribution ==
Neolloydia matehualensis is native to the Mexican state of San Luis Potosí, south of Matehuala. The species was first described in 1948 by botanist Curt Backeberg. Plants are found growing in limestone hills in low shrubland.

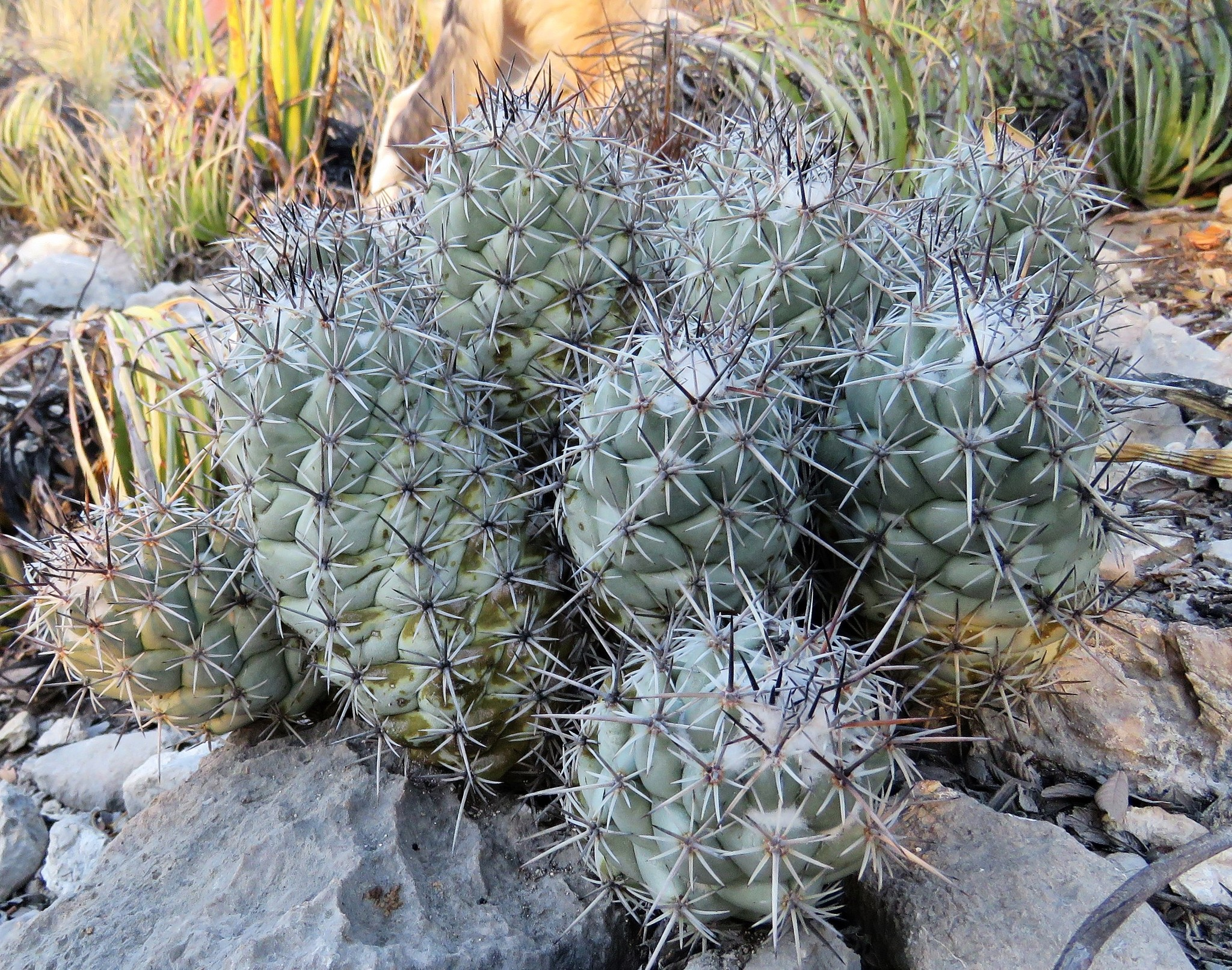
Plant growing in San Luis Potosí

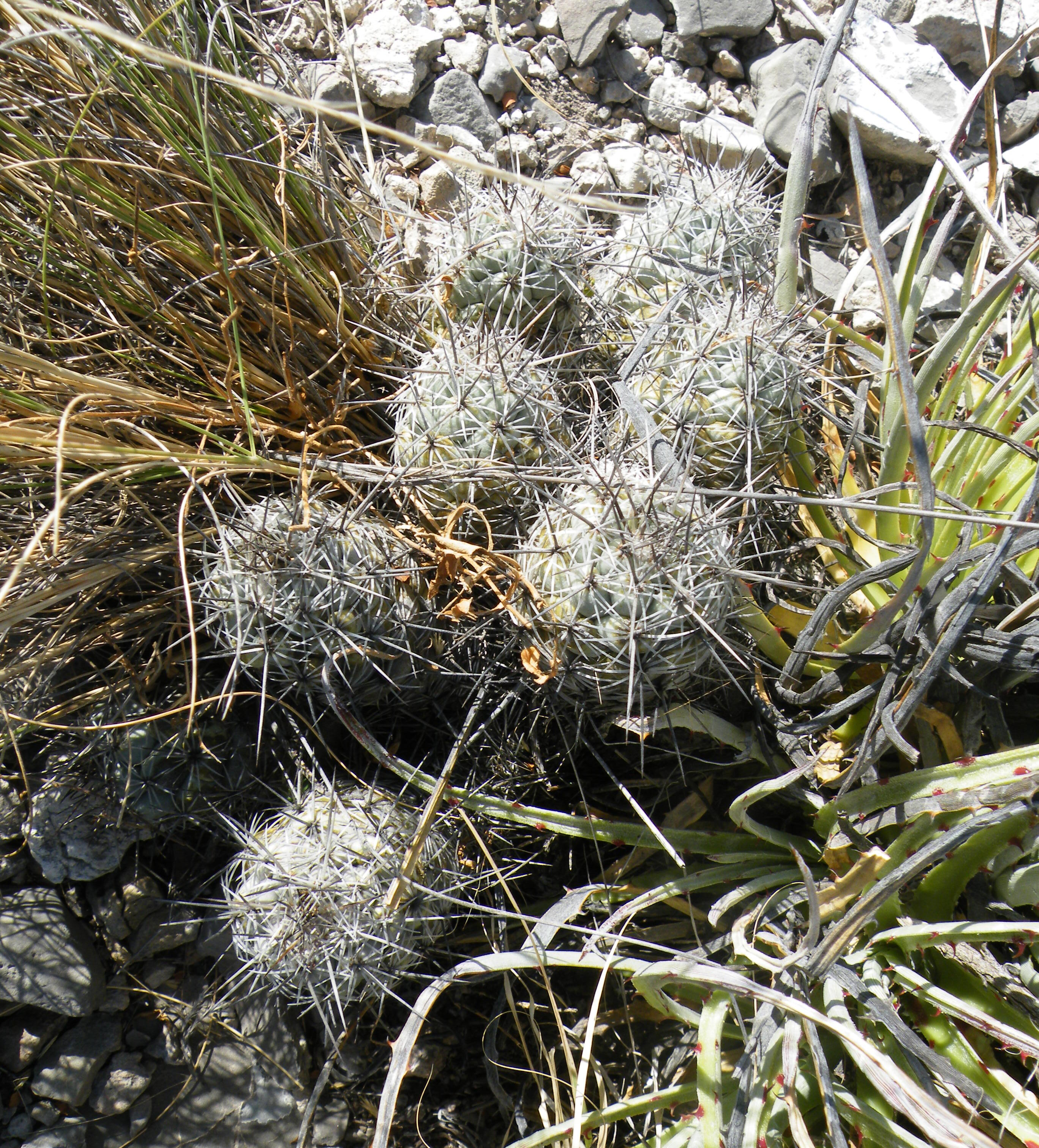
Plant in habitat

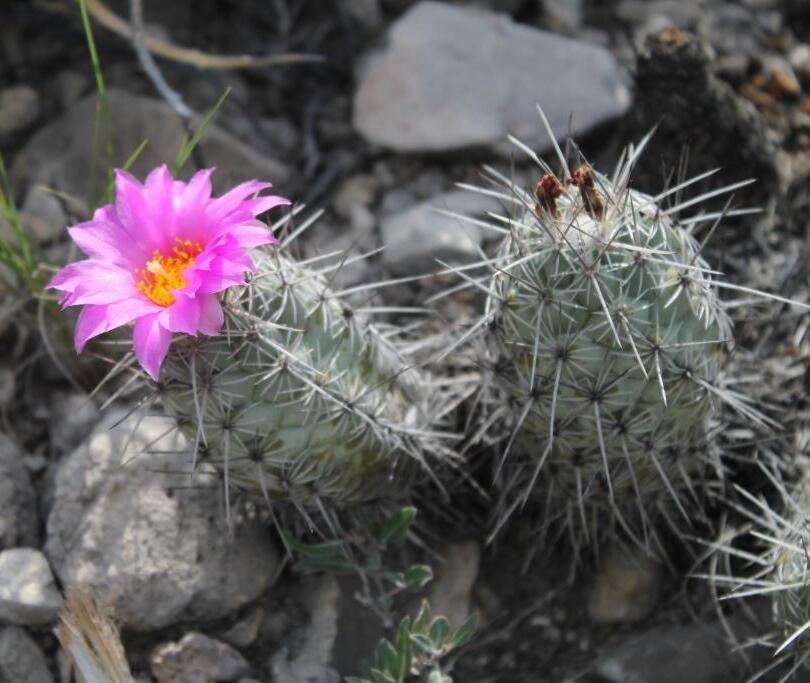
Blooming plant in San Luis Potosí

== Taxonomy ==
This species was first describe in 1948 by German botanist Curt Backeberg who named it after Matehuala where it was found.
