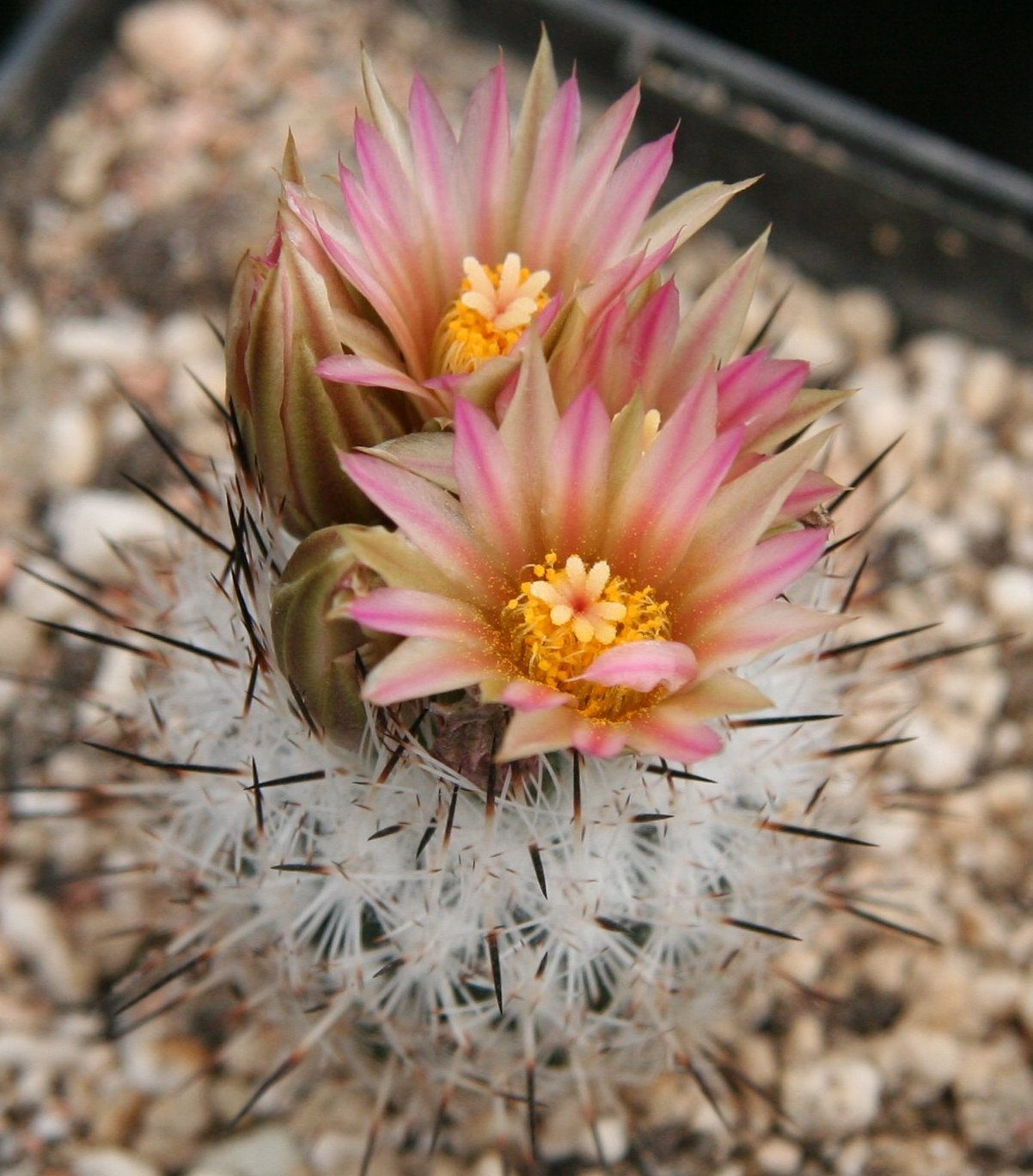
- Rapicactus zaragosae

Scientific classification
- Kingdom: Plantae
- Clade: Tracheophytes
- Clade: Angiosperms
- Clade: Eudicots
- Order: Caryophyllales
- Family: Cactaceae
- Subfamily: Cactoideae
- Tribe: Cacteae
- Genus: Rapicactus; Buxb. & Oehme

Type species
- Rapicactus subterraneus

Species
- See text.

= Rapicactus =

Genus of cactus

Rapicactus is a genus of cactus in the tribe Cacteae, subfamily Cactoideae. It has been synonymized with Turbinicarpus but molecular phylogenetic studies have supported its monophyly and separation from that genus.

== Taxonomy ==
The genus Rapicactus was proposed in 1942 by Buxbaum and Oehme. It was characterized by having thick roots with a constriction above forming a neck. However, most subsequent treatments sank the genus into a broadly circumscribed genus Turbinicarpus. The circumscription of Turbinicarpus has been described as "remarkably unstable", with species regularly transferred to other genera. The broad circumscription of Turbinicarpus was recognized as polyphyletic by Hunt in 2016. A phylogenetic study published in 2019 showed that a monophyletic Rapicactus was sister to Acharagma, separated from a monophyletic Turbinicarpus:

- - - - Three species of other genera
      - - Acharagma
        - Rapicactus
    - Species of other genera
  - - Species of other genera
    - - Kadenicarpus
      - - Ariocarpus
        - Turbinicarpus s.s.

=== Species ===
As of May 2024, Plants of the World Online accepted four species:

Image	Scientific name	Distribution
	Rapicactus beguinii (N.P.Taylor) Lüthy	NE. Mexico
	Rapicactus booleanus (G.S.Hinton) D.Donati	Mexico (Nuevo León)
	Rapicactus mandragora (Fric ex A.Berger) Buxb. & Oehme	Mexico (Durango, Coahuila, Nuevo León)
	Rapicactus subterraneus (Backeb.) Buxb. & Oehme	Mexico (Nuevo León, Tamaulipas, San Luis Potosí)
	Rapicactus zaragosae (Glass & R.A.Foster) D.Donati	Mexico (Nuevo León, Tamaulipas)
