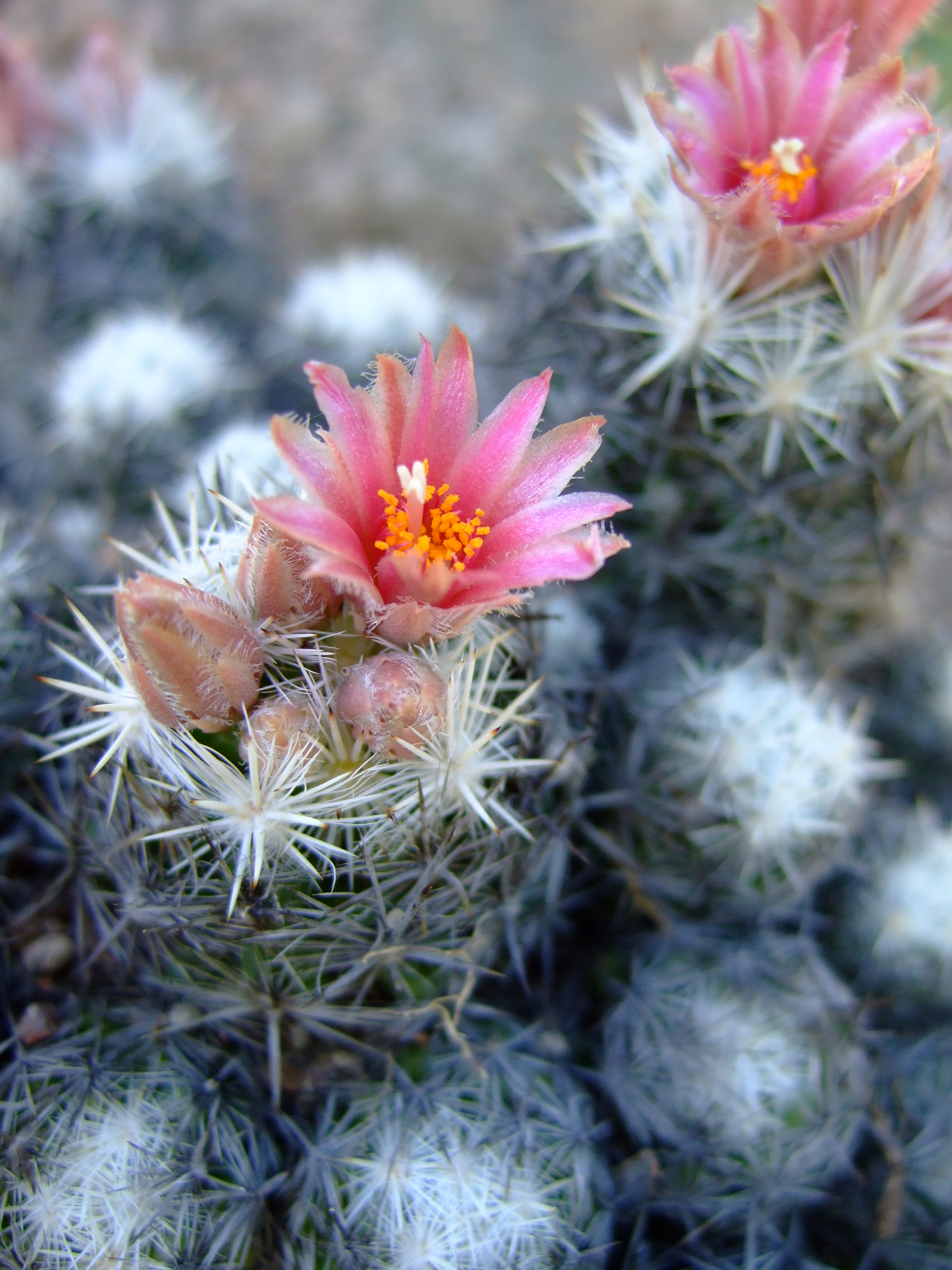

Conservation status
- Apparently Secure (NatureServe)
- CITES Appendix I

Scientific classification
- Kingdom: Plantae
- Clade: Embryophytes
- Clade: Tracheophytes
- Clade: Angiosperms
- Clade: Eudicots
- Order: Caryophyllales
- Family: Cactaceae
- Subfamily: Cactoideae
- Genus: Pelecyphora
- Species: P. sneedii

Binomial name
- Pelecyphora sneedii (Britton & Rose) D.Aquino & Dan.Sánchez

Synonyms
- Escobaria sneedii Britton & Rose; Coryphantha sneedii (B. & R.) A.Berger; Mammillaria sneedii (B. & R.) Cory; Coryphantha vivipara var. sneedii (B. & R.) Gorelick

= Pelecyphora sneedii =

Species of cactus

Pelecyphora sneedii (syn. Coryphantha sneedii) is a rare species of cactus known by the common names Sneed's pincushion cactus and carpet foxtail cactus. It is endemic to the Chihuahuan Desert of the southwestern United States and northwestern Mexico. It is a small, variable cactus with a lengthy taxonomic history, and is often subdivided into a number of subspecies or varieties. It is usually found on steep, rocky habitats, primarily of limestone geology, in desert scrub or coniferous forest. A species of conservation concern, P. sneedii faces threats from poaching, urban encroachment, and wildfires.

The former cacti species Coryphantha orcuttii has been lumped into sneedii as a subspecies. P. sneedii also intergrades with Pelecyphora vivipara, further complicating classification. Because of the variation and intergradation of P. sneedii, it forms a species complex.

== Description ==
=== Morphology ===
Pelecyphora sneedii is a small cactus growing up to about 27 centimetres (11 in) tall, but sometimes revealing just a few centimeters above ground level, the rest of the stem buried. The species may branch profusely, even when small and immature, forming up to 250 branches in some populations. It is coated densely in areoles of bright white spines; each areole may have nearly 100 spines. There are 25 to 52 radial spines per areole that are more or less appressed or tightly appressed, measuring 3–14 mm (0.12–0.55 in) long. There are 8 to 17 outer central spines per areole, which may be appressed to strongly projecting. There are up to 5 inner central spines per areole, which are typically straight and radiate like spokes, measuring 3–25 mm (0.12–0.98 in) long. Depending on the substrate, the spines may be tinted with yellow, pink, purple, or brown. They may have dark tips and as the cactus ages the spines darken to gray and even black.

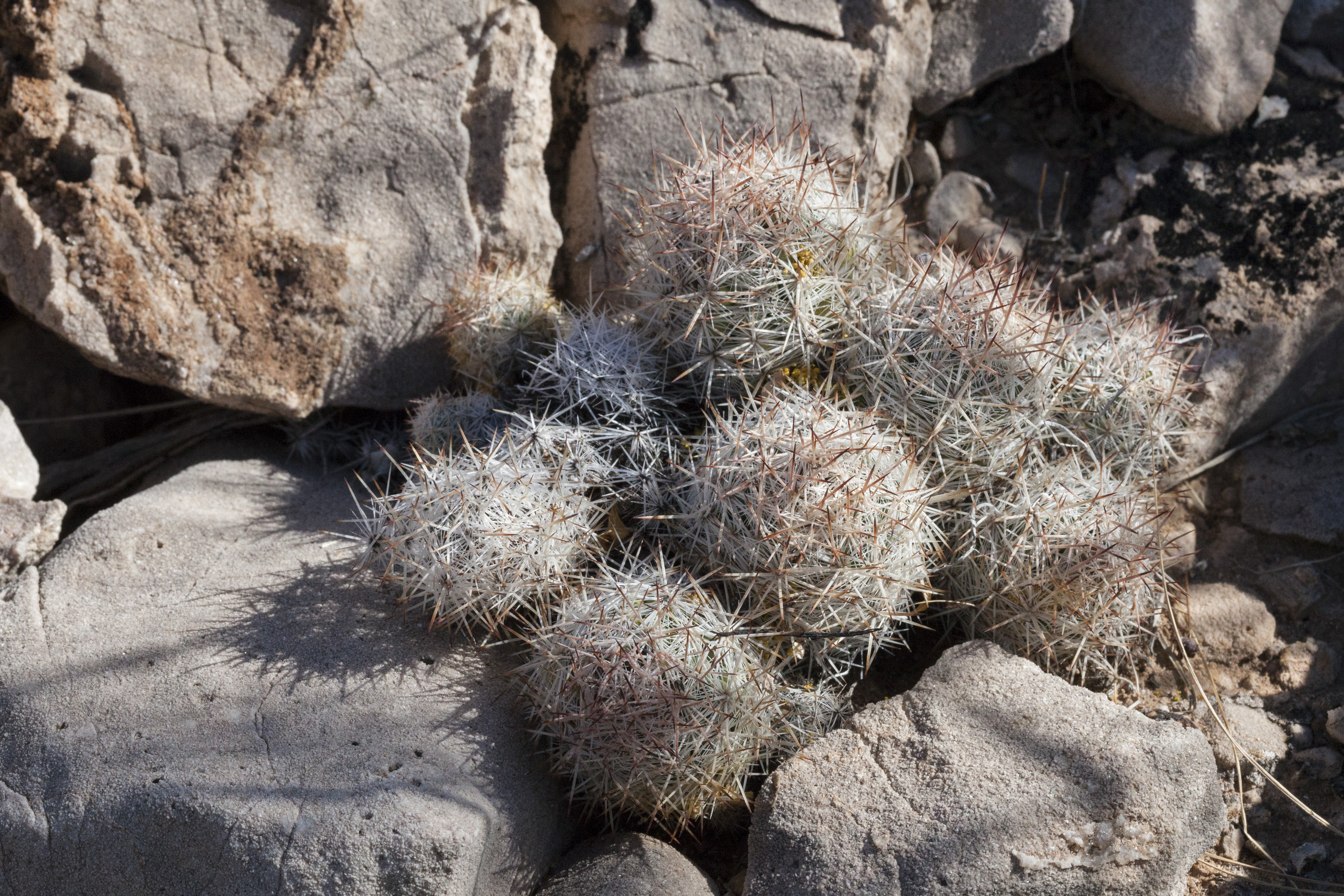
P. sneedii in habitat, Doña Ana County, New Mexico.

P. sneedii typically blooms in spring from March to June, bearing flowers 1–3 cm (0.39–1.18 in) long and 7–25 mm (0.28–0.98 in) wide near the apical part of the stem. The outer tepals are sparsely to densely fringed at the margins. There are 11 to 26 inner tepals, and vary in color from white, cream, pale tan, greenish white, or pale rose-pink. There are usually well-defined midstripes of various colors (usually darker) on the tepals, or they can sometimes be absent. The inner tepals measure 5–14 mm (0.20–0.55 in) long by 0.8–4 mm (0.031–0.157 in) wide. The stamens have low-contrast filaments (often the same color as the tepals) with sulphur yellow or canary yellow anthers atop. The stigma is divided into 2 to 7 pale lobes, 1–3 mm (0.039–0.118 in) long.

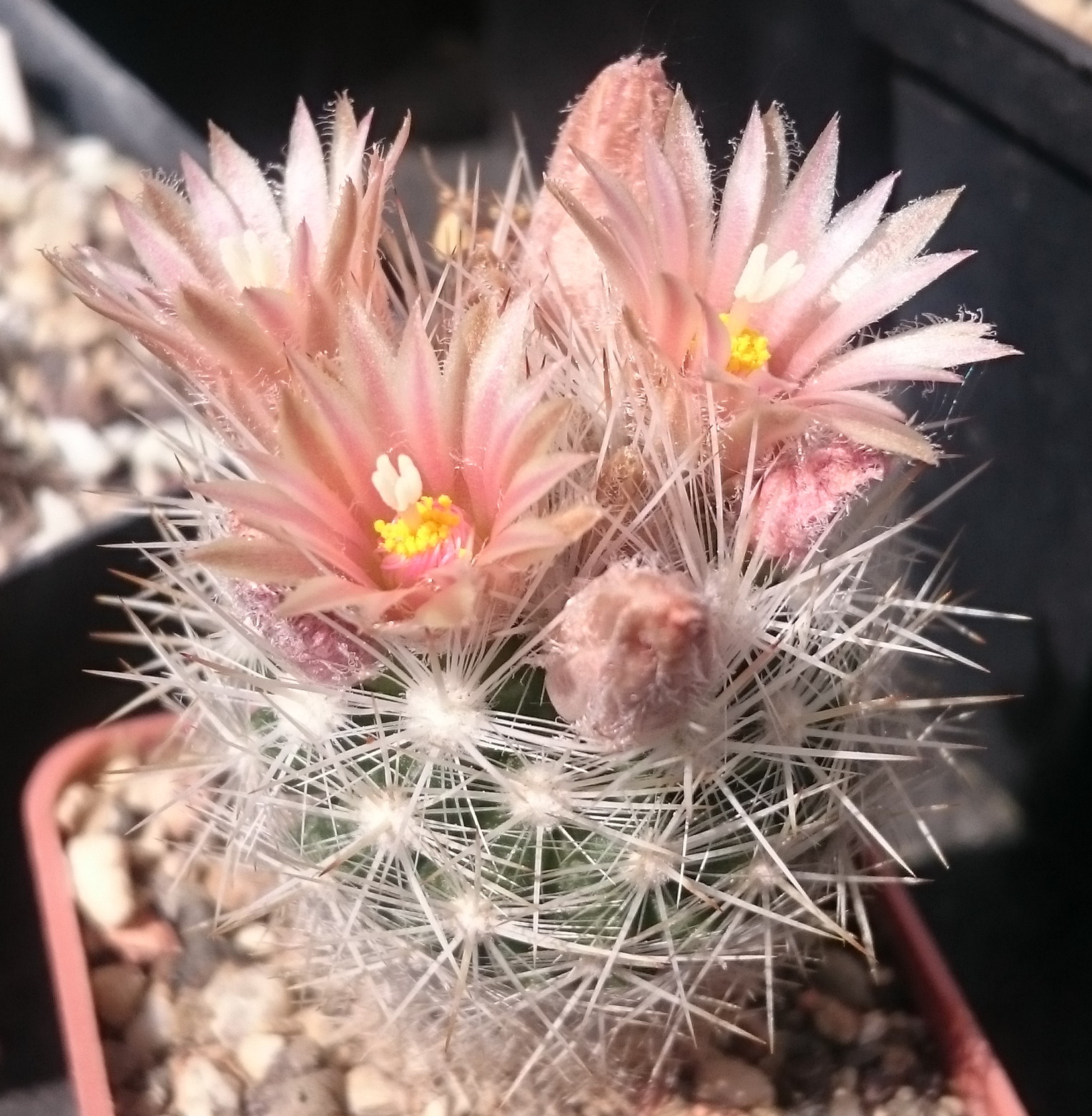
The flowers of P. sneedii, in a cultivated plant originally classified as Escobaria guadalupensis.

The fruits, which emerge from May to September, are dimorphic, with "red" (blood-red to magenta) and "green" (greenish-yellow to brown or purple) color phases. The fruits have a cylindric to fusiform or obovoid to narrowly clavate shape, and are up to 21 millimetres (0.83 in) long. The dried remains of the flower remain persistent on the fruit, and the fruit quickly dries out of its originally juicy and succulent form. The seeds are a brownish color, and are 1.6 millimetres (0.063 in) long, with a distinctive pitting on their surface.

== Taxonomy ==
=== Taxonomic history ===
Escobaria sneedii was first described by botanists Nathaniel Lord Britton and Joseph Nelson Rose in 1923, in the fourth volume of their monograph The Cactaceae. The species is named after J.R. Sneed, who collected the type specimen in the Franklin Mountains of Texas. The specimen was then sent to Britton and Rose by S.L. Pattison in 1921.

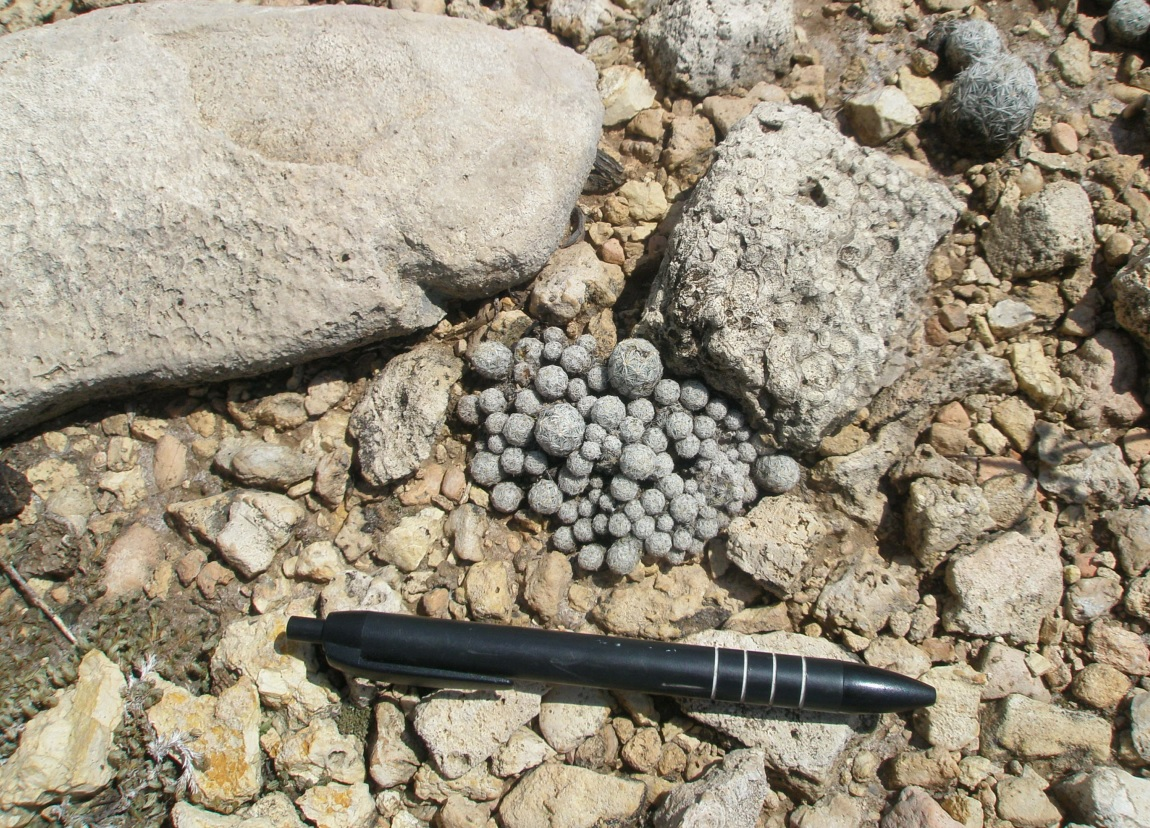
A plant of the subspecies (or variety) leei, which is characterized by its small size. A pen is included for scale.

=== Modern classification ===
Taxonomic circumscription of the Mammillaria and its clade of related genera (the 'Mammilloid' clade) (Note: The 'Mammilloid' clade is generally circumscribed as the genera Cochemiea, Coryphantha, Cumarinia, Escobaria, Mammillaria, Neolloydia, and Ortegocactus) has been complicated, and until recently was based largely on morphological characters. Escobaria has been recognized as a subgroup of Coryphantha since Benson (1969, 1982) and Coryphantha was originally circumscribed in 1856 by Engelmann as a subgenus of Mammillaria. Molecular phylogenetic studies starting in the 21st century suggested a number of these genera were not in fact monophyletic, and demanded re-circumscription.

Coryphantha was suggested to be placed within the Mammilloid clade from a number of studies, but was also shown not to be monophyletic. In 2021, Breslin et al. revised the Mammilloid clade based on the phylogenetic evidence up to that point, resulting in three genera, Mammillaria sensu stricto, Cochemeia sensu lato, and Coryphantha (including Escobaria). However, the study by Breslin used a low number of samples for the Coryphantha, necessitating a 2022 study by Sánchez et al. focused on the Coryphantha in particular. Monophyly of Coryphantha was achieved by excluding Escobaria, Pelecyphora, and Coryphantha macromeris, which formed their own monophyletic group.

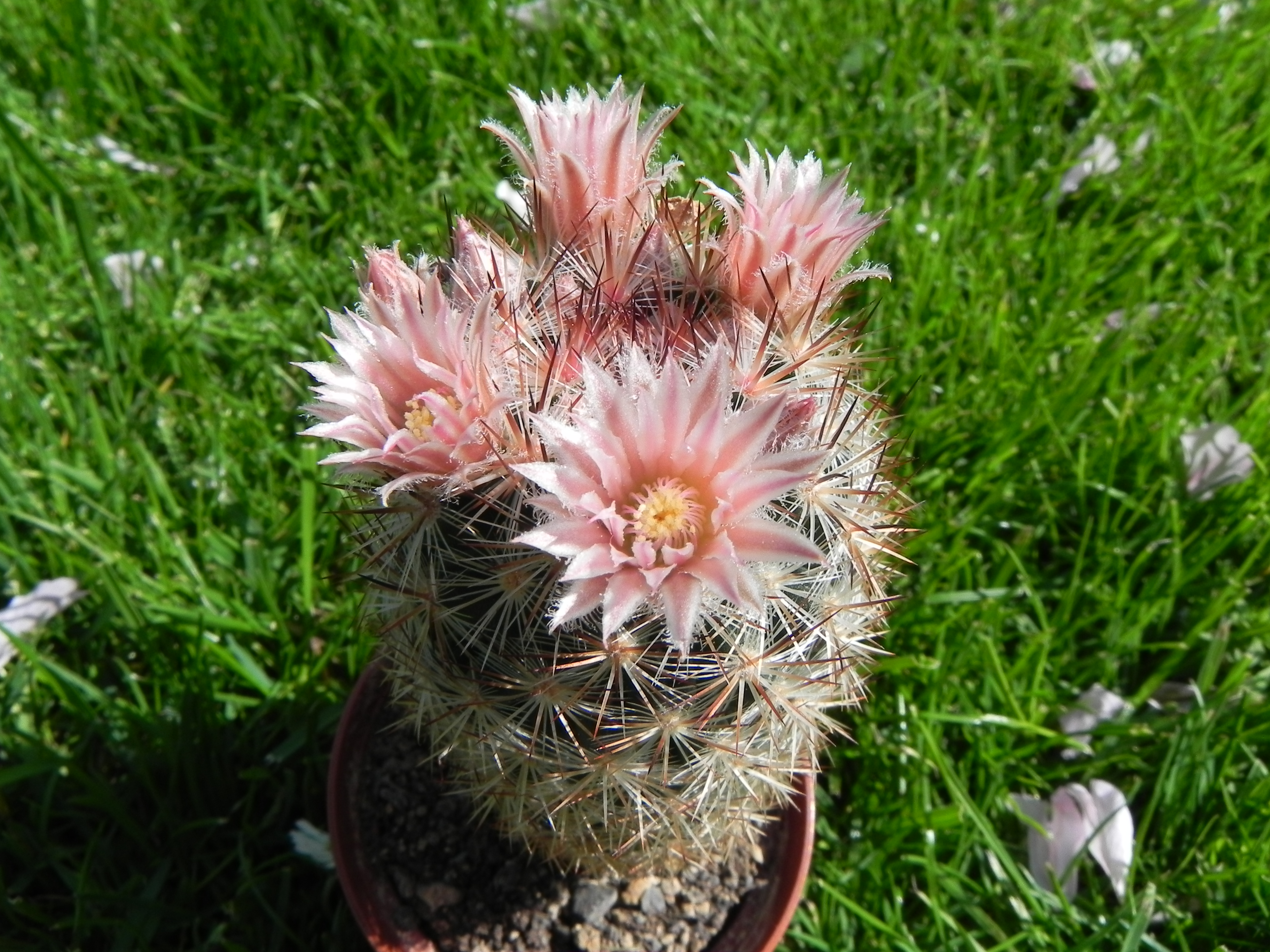
A plant of P. sneedii subsp. orcuttii in flower in cultivation.

Due to the priority of publication principle (Principle III) dictated by the International Code of Nomenclature for algae, fungi, and plants, Escobaria and C. macromeris are merged into Pelecyphora, as it was published first in 1843 by Ehrenberg, preceding Britton and Rose's Escobaria by 80 years. The restructuring of the Coryphantha, Pelecyphora and Escobaria results in the current combination for this species, Pelecyphora sneedii.

==== As a species complex ====
As Gorelick (2015, 2021) notes in his articles on the plants, Coryphantha sneedii integrades with Coryphantha vivipara and both have a wide variety of taxa (both at species name or as infraspecies of both) in their continuum. The two also overlap in range. It is often very difficult to distinguish plants of C. sneedii with C. vivipara, and even moreso with the varieties of each, although both C. sneedii and C. vivipara are readily distinguishable from other plants placed in the Coryphantha by their druses, fruits, and pericarpels. Gorelick in 2021 suggested combining the entire species complex of C. sneedii as a single variety of C. vivipara. (Note: The generic classification in this section is reverted to Coryphantha to align with the context of Gorelick's 2021 article, published before the recombination in Sánchez et al.)

Taxa of the Pelecyphora sneedii complex
Specific epithet	Taxonomic treatment		
Specific epithet	POWO & Sánchez et al.	Flora of North America	Gorelick, 2021
orcuttii	Pelecyphora sneedii subsp. orcuttii	Coryphantha sneedii	Coryphantha vivipara var. sneedii
organensis	Pelecyphora sneedii subsp. orcuttii	Coryphantha sneedii	Coryphantha vivipara var. sneedii
sandbergii	Pelecyphora sneedii subsp. orcuttii	Coryphantha sneedii	Coryphantha vivipara var. sneedii
villardii	Pelecyphora sneedii subsp. orcuttii	Coryphantha sneedii	Coryphantha vivipara var. sneedii
sneedii	Pelecyphora sneedii subsp. sneedii	Coryphantha sneedii	Coryphantha vivipara var. sneedii
albicolumnaria	Pelecyphora sneedii subsp. sneedii	Coryphantha sneedii	Coryphantha vivipara var. sneedii
leei	Pelecyphora sneedii subsp. sneedii	Coryphantha sneedii	Coryphantha vivipara var. sneedii
guadalupensis	Pelecyphora sneedii subsp. sneedii	Coryphantha sneedii	Coryphantha vivipara var. sneedii
vivipara	Pelecyphora vivipara	Coryphantha vivipara	Coryphantha vivipara

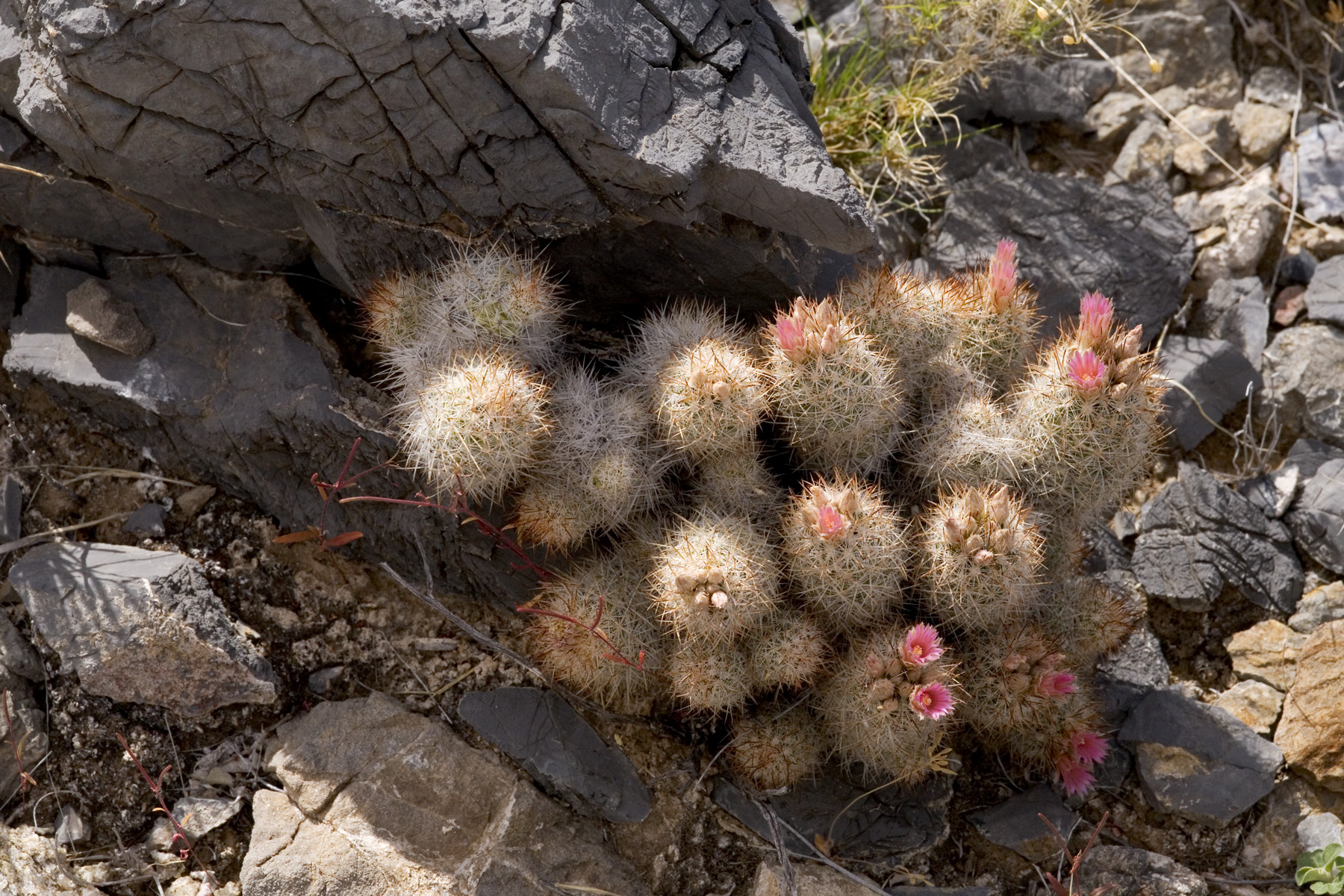
P. sneedii subsp. orcuttii, in flower. The pictured plant was formerly classified as Coryphantha sandbergii, which is now lumped into P. s. ssp. orcuttii

=== Subspecies ===
Recognition of infraspecific taxa within Pelecyphora sneedii varies across sources. The variability of this species makes infraspecific circumscription difficult. Some sources, like the Flora of North America, do not recognize any infraspecific taxa at all. The rank at which they are recognized also varies, with some placing the infraspecific taxa as varieties and others as subspecies. The variability of Pelecyphora sneedii poses a difficulty to the conservation of the species, as some of the infraspecific taxa designated as threatened (e.g. subsp. leei) are not universally recognized. The United States Fish and Wildlife Service continues to recognize var. leei and var. sneedii and both are listed as threatened taxa as of 2023.

A cactus described in the 1980s, Escobaria sneedii var. guadalupensis, is sometimes included within this species. But is a synonym of var. sneedii.

Sánchez et al. and Plants of the World Online recognize the two subspecies Pelecyphora sneedii subsp. orcuttii and Pelecyphora sneedii subsp. sneedii.

== Distribution and habitat ==
It is native to the Chihuahuan Desert, where it occurs in scattered locations in New Mexico, Texas, and Chihuahua. Some plants occurring in Arizona may be included within this species. It is usually found in broken, rocky terrain and steep slopes of Silurian-Ordovician-Cambrian limestone, usually in Chihuahuan desert scrub and sometimes in coniferous woodlands in the Trans-Pecos region.

== Conservation ==
This cactus, particularly var. sneedii was heavily collected for the cactus trade starting in the 1920s when it was discovered. The var. leei also faced this threat. There was no need for this poaching, because the plant is easily propagated in the garden. They have been overharvested from their natural habitat, the main reason why the two varieties, var. sneedii and var. leei, have been federally listed as endangered and threatened, respectively. Most authors believe that var. leei is a New Mexico endemic that only grows in Carlsbad Caverns National Park, and any P. sneedii outside the park are var. sneedii. Threats to the species outside the national park include habitat loss. One example is the loss of a population of var. sneedii that occurred when a road was built connecting Las Cruces, New Mexico, and El Paso, Texas.

== Cultivation ==
Sneed's pincushion cactus is popular with cactus enthusiasts and dealers because of its often petite size and tolerance for moderately cold climates.

In cultivation, it prefers a well-draining inorganic substrate, as the roots are easily susceptible to rot. Sneed's cactus must be kept completely dry during its dormant season in the winter months, and atmospheric humidity must be kept at a low. Regular watering may be done throughout the spring and summer once the growing season has resumed, provided the soil is well-drained. Fertilization requirements are simple, consisting of a high-potassium fertilizer during the summer growing season for Sneed's feed, and seed propagation is equally straightforward, with seeds sown after the last frost in spring typically germinating within one to two weeks provided they are well-ventilated and kept out of direct sun. Sneed's pincushion can also be propagated asexually via offsets from the base of the plant.
