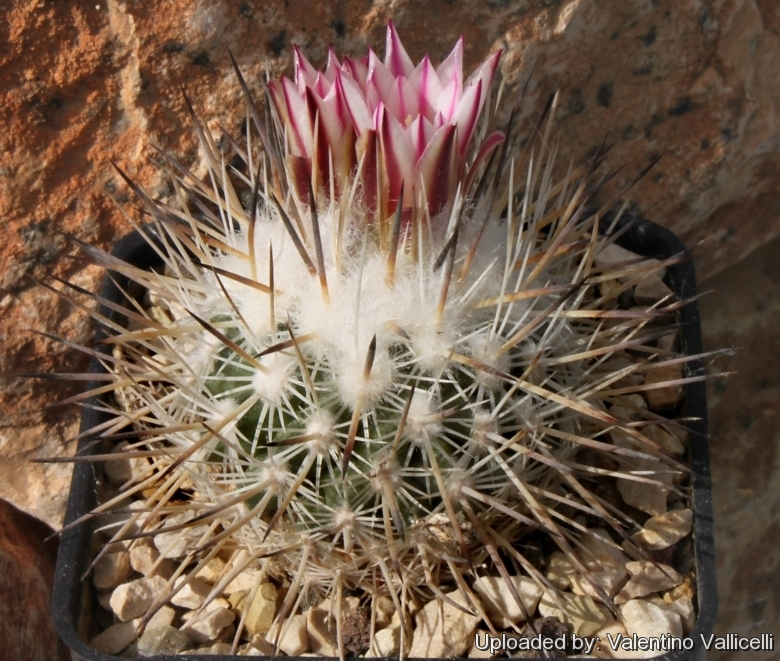

Conservation status
- Critically Endangered (IUCN 3.1)
- CITES Appendix I

Scientific classification
- Kingdom: Plantae
- Clade: Tracheophytes
- Clade: Angiosperms
- Clade: Eudicots
- Order: Caryophyllales
- Family: Cactaceae
- Subfamily: Cactoideae
- Genus: Rapicactus
- Species: R. mandragora

Binomial name
- Rapicactus mandragora (Fric ex A.Berger) Buxb. & Oehme

Synonyms
- Echinocactus mandragora Fric ex A.Berger; Gymnocactus mandragora (Fric ex A.Berger) Backeb.; Lodia mandragora (Fric ex A.Berger) Mosco & Zanov.; Neolloydia mandragora (Fric ex A.Berger) E.F.Anderson; Pediocactus mandragora (Fric ex A.Berger) Halda; Turbinicarpus mandragora (Fric ex A.Berger) A.D.Zimmerman

= Rapicactus mandragora =

Species of cactus

Rapicactus mandragora, synonym Turbinicarpus mandragora, is a species of plant in the family Cactaceae.

It is endemic to Coahuila state in Mexico. Its natural habitat is hot deserts. It is a Critically Endangered species, threatened by habitat destruction.

== Description ==
Rapicactus mandragora usually grows solitary with grey-green, globular to elongated bodies and has tuberous to rounded thickened roots, which are formed from an often long, neck-like or stalk-shaped base. The bodies reach heights of 3-5 centimeters and diameters of 4-6 centimeters. Their ribs are conical. The 1 to 2 straight, protruding, whitish central spines become darker with age and are 1.8 - 2.2 centiimeters long. The 8 - 14 radiating, straight, white marginal spines are between 8-15 millimeters long.

The flowers are white with a reddish central stripe or yellow. They are 2 centimeters long and have a diameter of 2.5 centimeters. The spherical fruits are reddish green.

=== Subspecies ===
- Rapicactus mandragora subsp. mandragora
- Rapicactus mandragora subsp. pailanus (Halda & Panar.) Lüthy

== Distribution ==
Rapicactus mandragora is widespread in the Mexican state of Coahuila.

== Taxonomy ==
The plant was first description as Echinocactus mandragora in 1929 by Alwin Berger. The specific epithet mandragora comes from Latin, means 'mandrake' and refers to the similarity of the root tubers of both species. Franz Buxbaum and Hans Oehme placed the species in the genus Rapicactus in 1942. Other nomenclature synonyms are Turbinicarpus mandragora (Frič ex A.Berger) A.D.Zimmerman (1991), Thelocactus mandragora A.Berger (1929), Gymnocactus mandragora (Frič ex A.Berger) Backeb. (1961), Neolloydia mandragora (Frič ex A.Berger) E.F.Anderson (1986), Pediocactus mandragora (Frič ex A.Berger) Halda (1998) and Lodia mandragora (Frič ex A.Berger) Mosco & Zanov. (2000).
