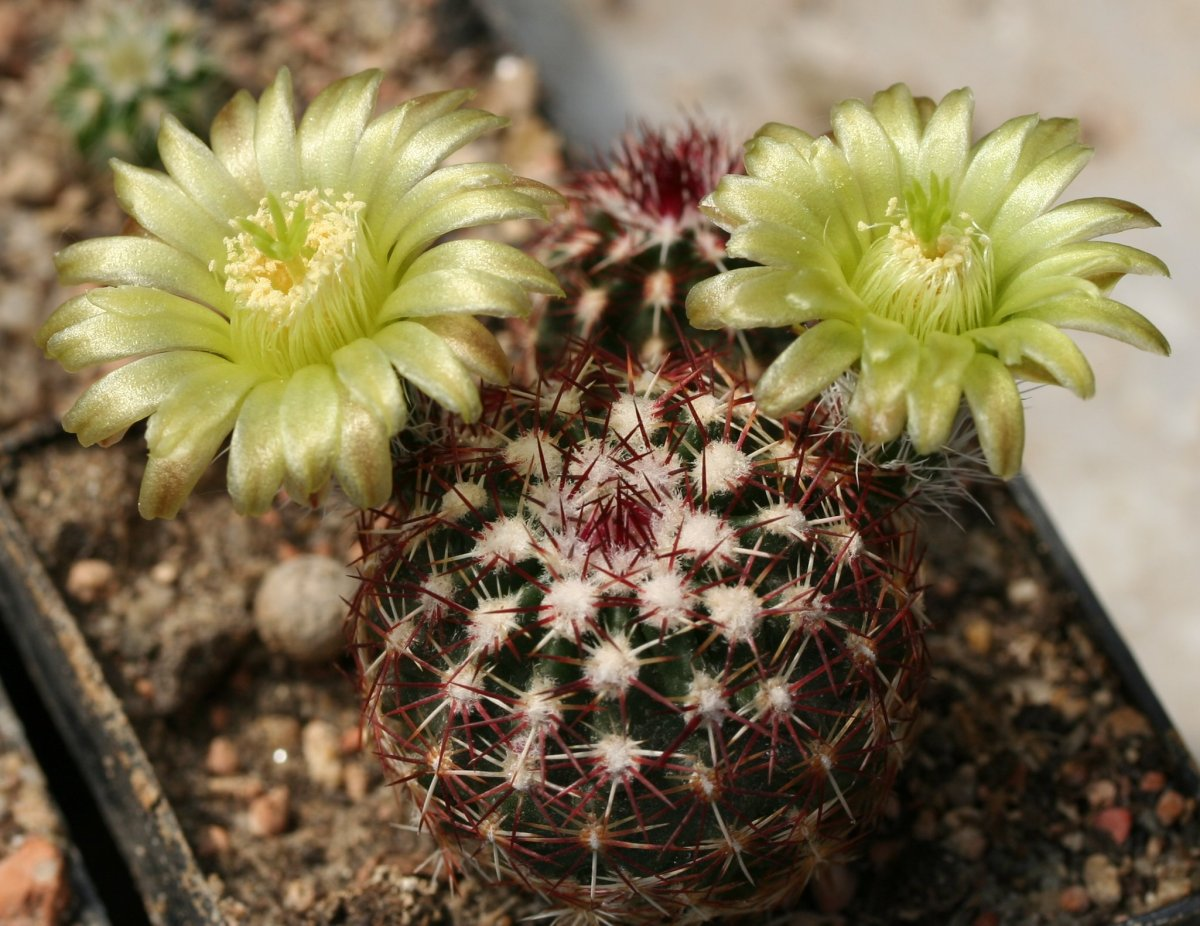

Conservation status
- Least Concern (IUCN 3.1)

- Secure (NatureServe)

Scientific classification
- Kingdom: Plantae
- Clade: Embryophytes
- Clade: Tracheophytes
- Clade: Angiosperms
- Clade: Eudicots
- Order: Caryophyllales
- Family: Cactaceae
- Subfamily: Cactoideae
- Genus: Echinocereus
- Species: E. viridiflorus

Binomial name
- Echinocereus viridiflorus Engelm.

Synonyms
- Cereus viridiflorus (Engelm.) Engelm. 1849; Echinocactus viridiflorus (Engelm.) Pritz. 1855

= Echinocereus viridiflorus =

Species of cactus

Echinocereus viridiflorus is a species of cactus known by the common names nylon hedgehog cactus, green pitaya, and small-flowered hedgehog cactus. It is native to the central and south-central United States and northern Mexico, where it can be found in varied habitat types, including desert scrub, woodlands, dry grasslands, and short-grass prairie.

== Description ==
This cactus has a small spherical to ovoid, sometimes elongated or cylindrical in shape, stem 3 cm (1.2 in) to over 30 cm (12 in) tall and up to 1 to 9 cm (0.39 to 3.54 in) wide. The 6 to 18 ribs are clearly humps. It is mostly unbranched but it may occur in squat clusters of several branches. The body of the plant is ridged and lined with many areoles bearing spines. The spines may be red, yellow, white, purplish, or bicolored, sometimes with darker tips and are up to 2.5 cm (0.98 in) long. The 8 to 24 marginal spines are also red, cream or brown and up to 1.8 cm (0.71 in) long. The flower is up to 3 cm (1.2 in) long and has tepals in shades of yellowish, brownish, greenish, or occasionally red, with darker reddish midstripes. The tepals are thin at the tips. They are usually wide open, funnel-shaped and green to yellow-green. They are 2.5 to 3.0 cm (0.98 to 1.18 in) long and large in diameter. The fruits are spherical, green and heavily thorny.

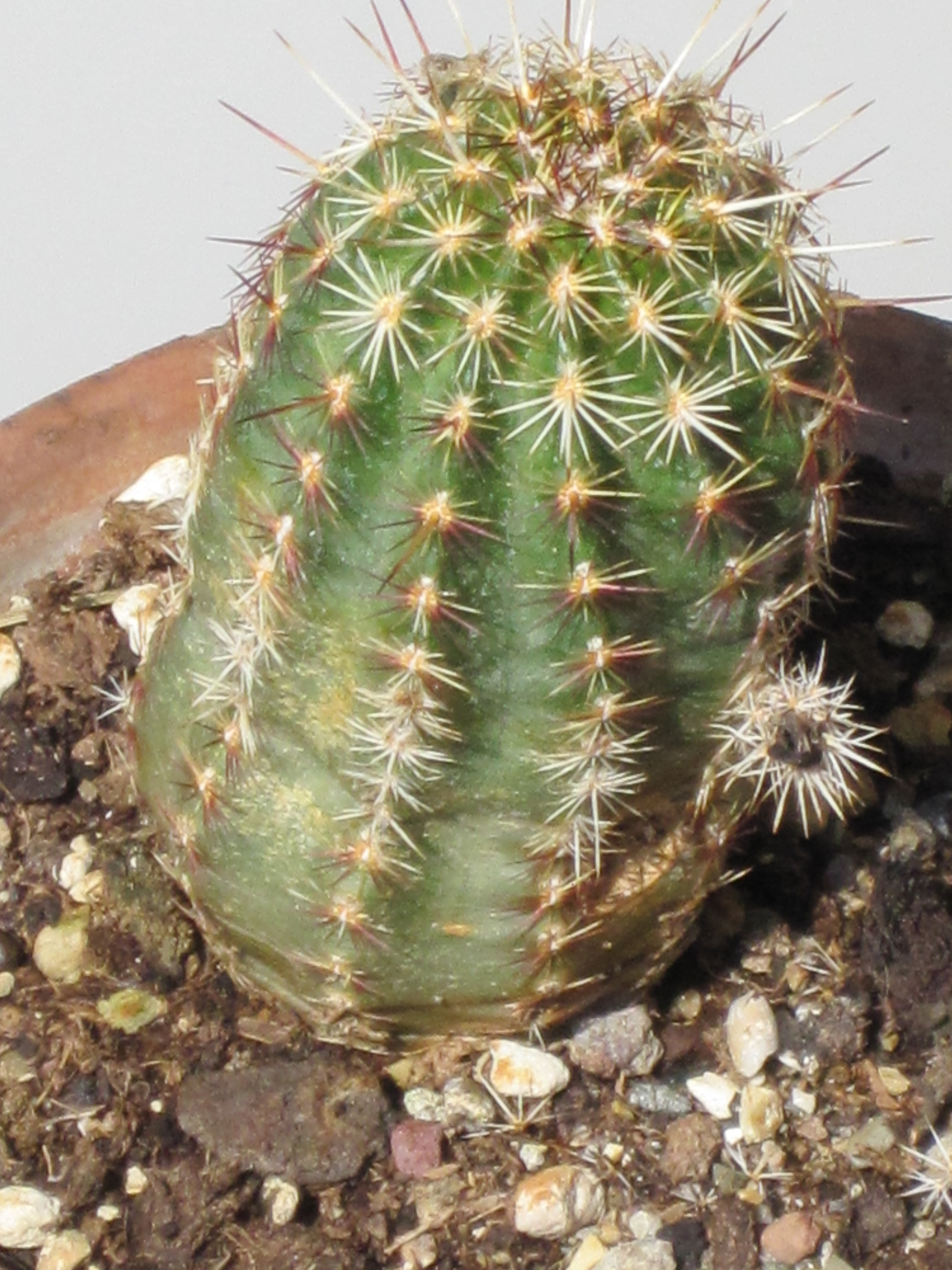
Echinocereus viridiflorus

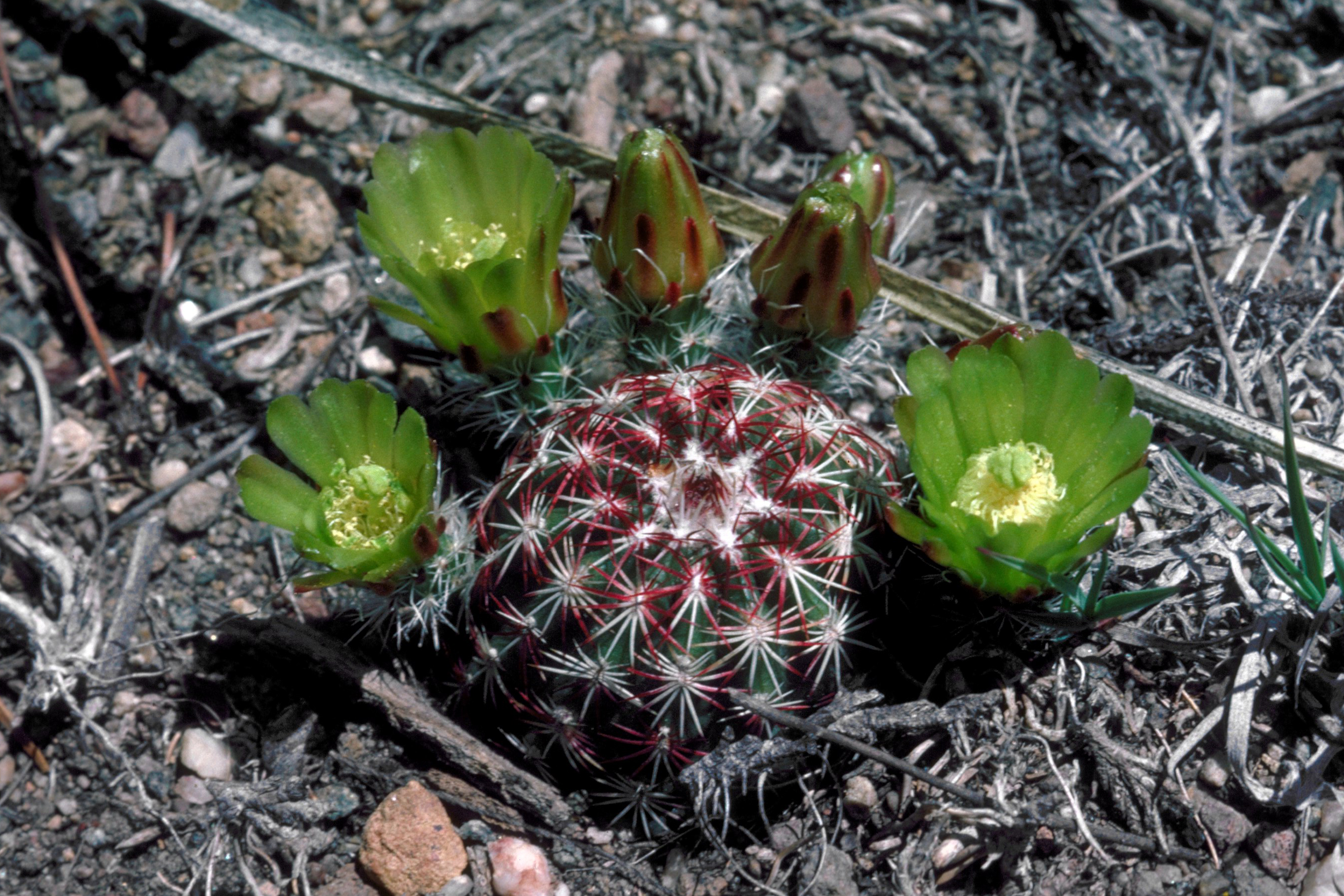

== Taxonomy ==
The species is most closely related to E. chloranthus (Engelm.) Haage and E. russanthus Weniger. These species share small seeds, basal nectaral tissue, and flowers that are yellow/brown and less than 4 cm in length.

The taxonomy within the species is uncertain, with authors recognizing several varieties which are sometimes treated as separate species. New molecular evidence suggests that E. viridiflorus subsp. cylindricus should be recognized as a distinct species because it has different morphology and different numbers of molecular autapomorphies than E. viridiflorus. One variety, var. davisii (sometimes called Echinocereus davisii), Davis' green pitaya, is federally listed as an endangered species. This taxon is very small, reaching no more than 3 centimeters tall. It becomes smaller when water is scarce, withdrawing under the ground, sometimes leaving just some spines sticking out.

=== Subspecies ===
Image	Name	Distribution
	Echinocereus viridiflorus subsp. correllii (L.D.Benson) W.Blum & Mich.Lange	SW. Texas.
	Echinocereus viridiflorus subsp. viridiflorus	SW. South Dakota to N. Texas and Mexico (Coahuila)

== Distribution ==
Echinocereus viridiflorus is widespread in the US states of South Dakota, Wyoming, Colorado, Kansas, New Mexico, Oklahoma and Texas, as well as in the neighboring Mexican states of Coahuila and Chihuahua. It has yellow-green flowers. This rare variety is endemic to Brewster County, Texas, where it grows in beds of Selaginella in rocky soils of novaculite origin. There was only one population known as of 1984, and it probably will not expand its range because it is limited to a specific mineral substrate.
