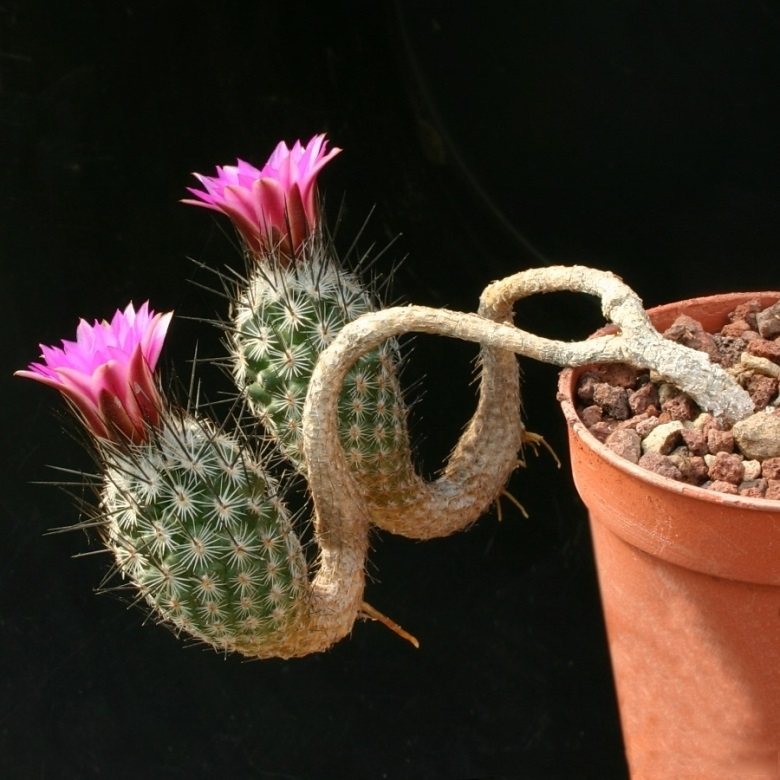

Conservation status
- Endangered (IUCN 3.1)

Scientific classification
- Kingdom: Plantae
- Clade: Tracheophytes
- Clade: Angiosperms
- Clade: Eudicots
- Order: Caryophyllales
- Family: Cactaceae
- Subfamily: Cactoideae
- Genus: Rapicactus
- Species: R. subterraneus

Binomial name
- Rapicactus subterraneus (Backeb.) Buxb. & Oehme

Synonyms
- Echinocactus subterraneus Backeb.; Gymnocactus subterraneus (Backeb.) Fritz Schwarz; Neolloydia subterranea (Backeb.) H.E.Moore; Pediocactus subterraneus (Backeb.) Halda; Turbinicarpus mandragora subsp. subterraneus (Backeb.) Lüthy

= Rapicactus subterraneus =

Species of cactus

Rapicactus subterraneus, synonym Turbinicarpus subterraneus, is a species of plant in the family Cactaceae. It is endemic to Mexico. Its natural habitat is hot deserts.

== Description ==
Rapicactus subterraneus is a solitary cactus, typically globose to globose-cylindrical, with an elongated and thin body that can reach over 15 cm in height and 3 cm in diameter. It has a tuberous root system with tubers that have four angles and are 3-5 mm high. The areoles bear 2 central spines, blackish-gray, rigid, erect, and 2 cm long, along with 16 to 19 radial spines, glassy-white, radial, strong, and 2 to 6 mm long.

The infundibuliform flowers are violet-pink to magenta, 2-2.5 cm long and 3 cm in diameter. R. subterraneus is hermaphroditic but requires winged insects and ants for cross-pollination. The small, greenish-brown fruits contain seeds dispersed by animals, water, and wind.

== Distribution ==
Endemic to Mexico, R. subterraneus has a restricted distribution, primarily near Saltillo in Coahuila, Aramberri in Nuevo León, San Luis Potosí, and Tamaulipas, at elevations of 1400-1700 meters. It thrives in xerophytic shrublands on shallow slopes with calcareous and gypsum soils, often growing alongside Agave lechuguilla, Pelecyphora strobiliformis, Turbinicarpus pseudopectinatus, Thelocactus hexaedrophorus, Ferocactus pilosus, Ferocactus uncinatus, Coryphantha glanduligera, and Echinocereus pectinatus.

== Sources ==
- Anderson, E.F., Fitz Maurice, W.A., Fitz Maurice, B., Hofer, A., Sotomayor, M., Arrendondo, A.G. & Sánchez, B. 2002. Turbinicarpus subterraneus. 2006 IUCN Red List of Threatened Species. Downloaded on 23 August 2007.
