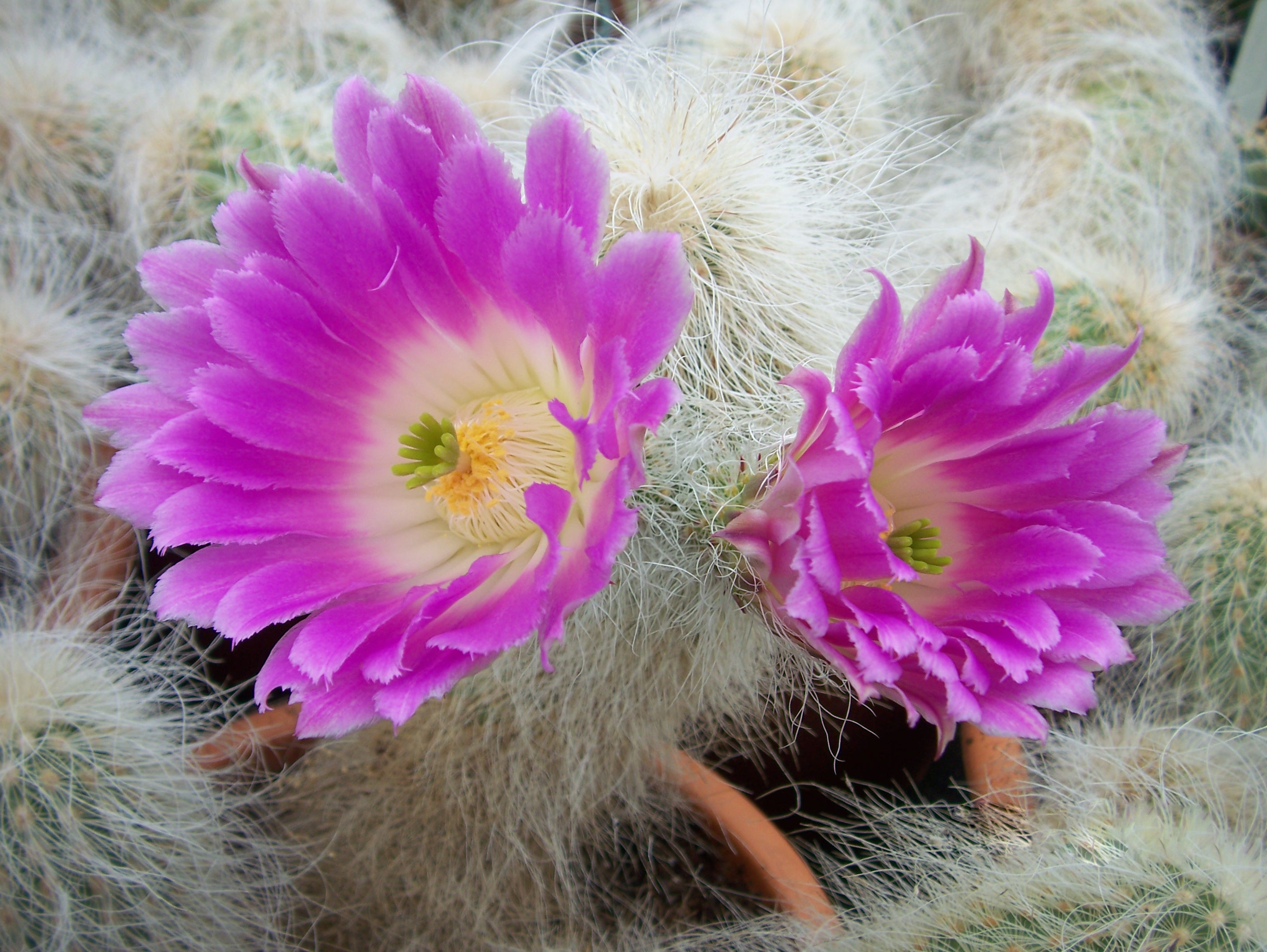

Conservation status
- Least Concern (IUCN 3.1)

Scientific classification
- Kingdom: Plantae
- Clade: Tracheophytes
- Clade: Angiosperms
- Clade: Eudicots
- Order: Caryophyllales
- Family: Cactaceae
- Subfamily: Cactoideae
- Genus: Echinocereus
- Species: E. longisetus

Binomial name
- Echinocereus longisetus (Engelm.) Lem.

Synonyms
- Cereus longisetus Engelm.

= Echinocereus longisetus =

Species of cactus

Echinocereus longisetus is a species of Echinocereus found in Mexico.

== Description ==
Echinocereus longisetus branches from the base, forming large clusters up to 1 meter in diameter. The upright cylindrical stems are 30 to 50 cm (12 to 20 in) long and 5 to 8 cm (2.0 to 3.1 in) in diameter, with 11 to 24 low, tuberculated ribs. The plant has four to nine central spines that are straight or curly, whitish to brownish, and 1 to 10 cm (0.39 to 3.94 in) long. It also has 15 to 20 white marginal spines, each 1 to 2 cm (0.39 to 0.79 in) long.

The funnel-shaped flowers are slightly pinkish-purple and appear near the base of the stems, not at the tips. They are 5 to 7 cm (2.0 to 2.8 in) long and 6 to 7 cm (2.4 to 2.8 in) in diameter.

=== Subspecies ===
There are two recognized subspecies:

Image	Scientific name	Distribution
	Echinocereus longisetus subsp. delaetii (Gürke) N.P.Taylor	Mexico (S. Coahuila)
	Echinocereus longisetus subsp. longisetus	Mexico (CN. Coahuila)

== Distribution ==
Echinocereus longisetus is found in the Mexican states of Coahuila and Nuevo León.

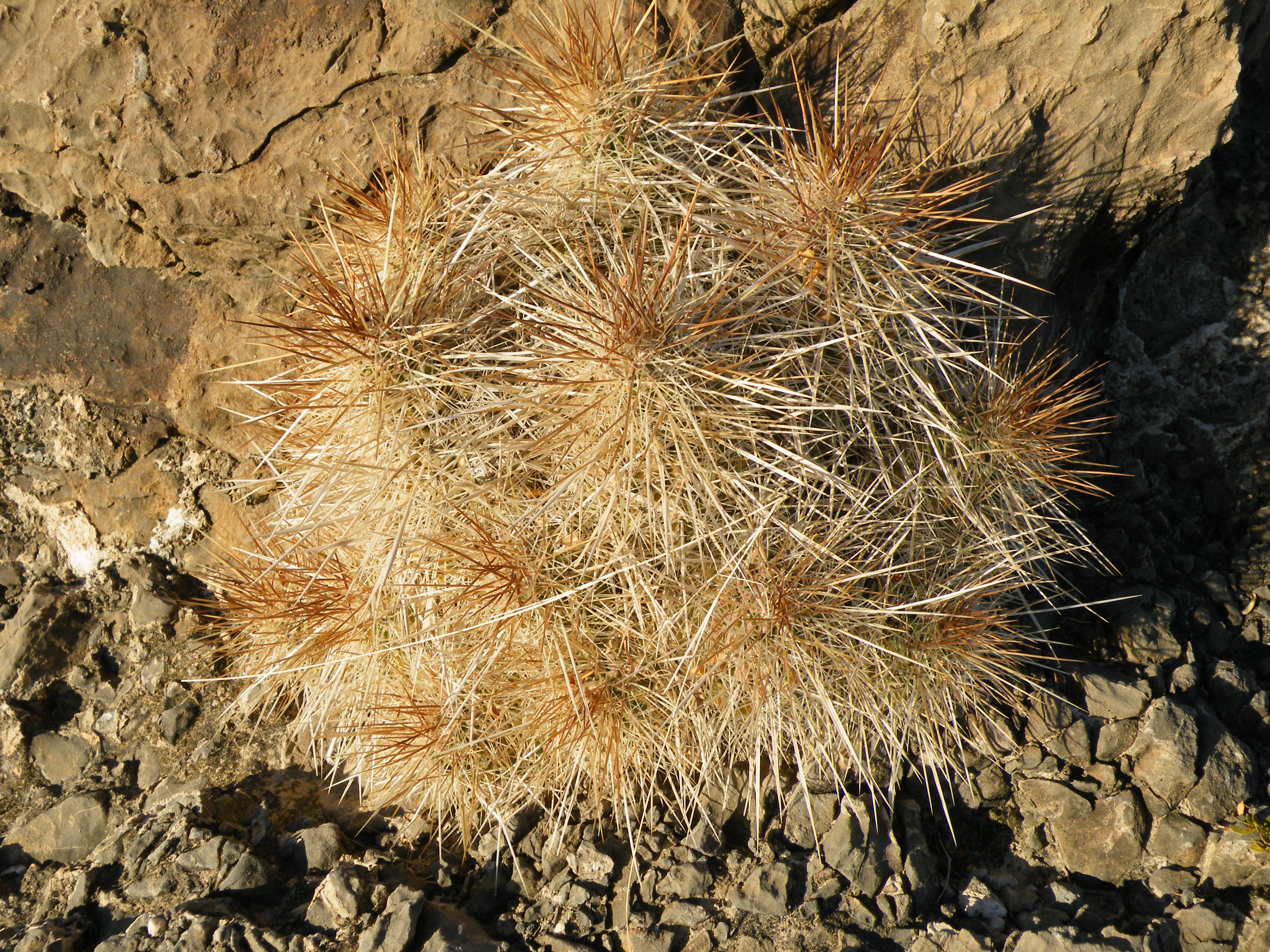
Plant growing in Viesca, Coahuila

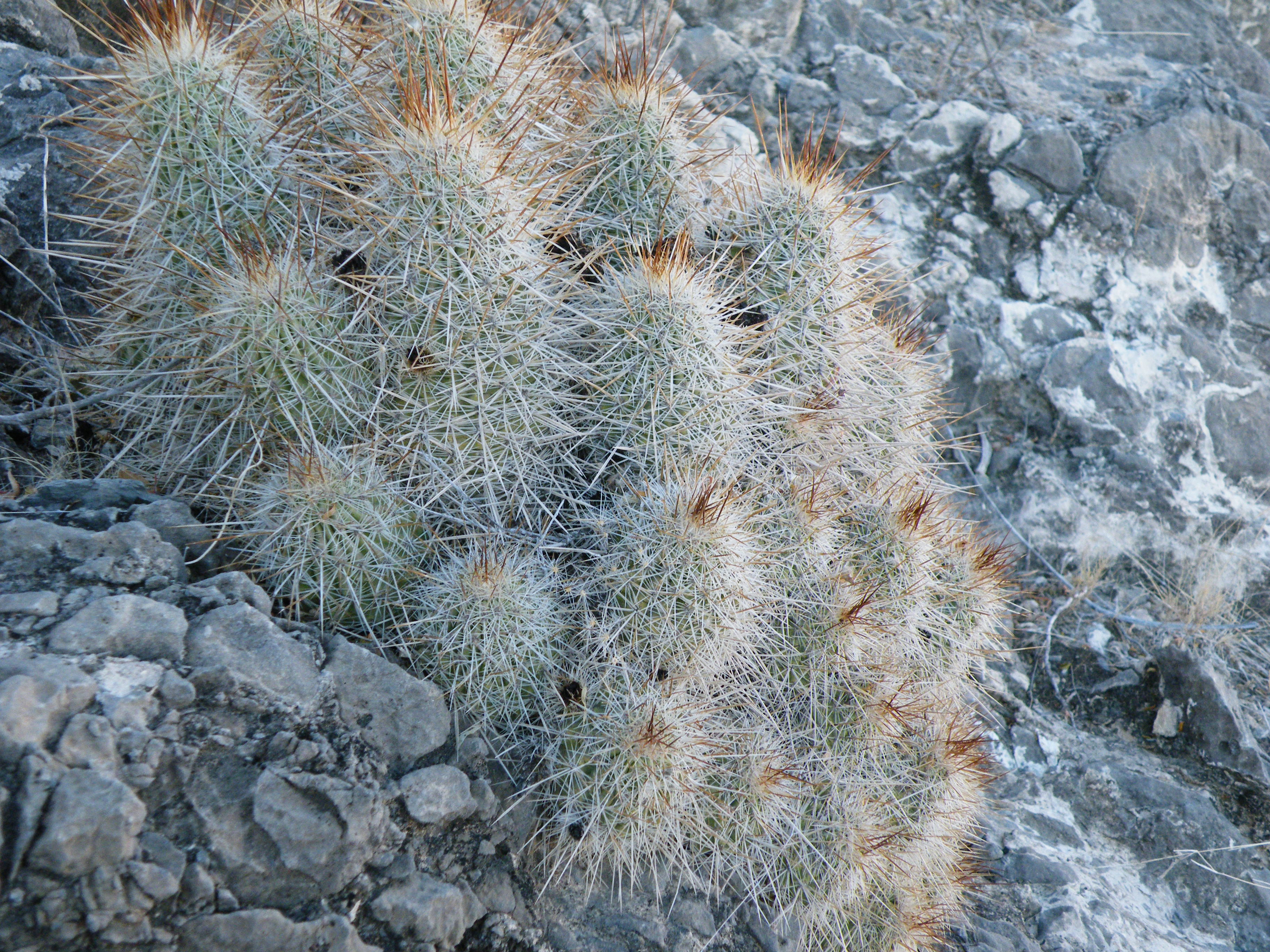
Habitat in Viesca, Coahuila

== Taxonomy ==
Originally described as Cereus longisetus by George Engelmann in 1856, the specific epithet "longisetus" comes from the Latin words "longus" (long) and "-setus" (bristly), referring to its long, bristle-like spines. Charles Lemaire reclassified it into the genus Echinocereus in 1868.
