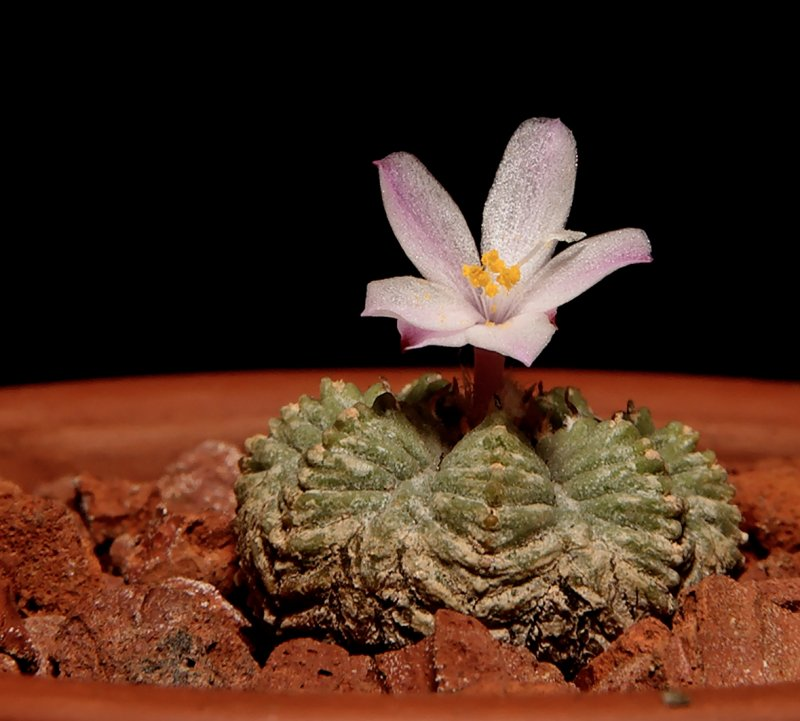

Conservation status
- Least Concern (IUCN 3.1)
- CITES Appendix I

Scientific classification
- Kingdom: Plantae
- Clade: Embryophytes
- Clade: Tracheophytes
- Clade: Spermatophytes
- Clade: Angiosperms
- Clade: Eudicots
- Order: Caryophyllales
- Family: Cactaceae
- Subfamily: Cactoideae
- Genus: Aztekium
- Species: A. ritteri

Binomial name
- Aztekium ritteri (Boed.) Boed.

Synonyms
- Echinocactus ritteri Boed. 1928; Aztekium ritteri var. rotundum Šnicer & Kunte 2019; Aztekium valdezii Velazco, M.A.Alvarado & S.Arias 2013

= Aztekium ritteri =

Species of cactus

Aztekium ritteri is a species of cactus native to the Mexican state of Nuevo León.

== Description ==
Aztekium ritteri initially grows singly globe-shaped, flattened stem, 2-6 cm in diameter and 3 cm high, with grayish green to olive-green, almost spherical to spherical bodies, somewhat sunken apex, which later sprout and form clumps. Ribs 6 to 11, to 9 millimeters high and 3 to 10 millimeters wide, with numerous triangular tubercles very compressed from top to bottom. Between the grooves that separate one rib from another, the bases of these tubercles, by lateral compression, form folds that look like narrower secondary ribs. Triangular tubercles. Areoles very close, with some felt, the apical ones very woolly. Spines 1 to 3 per areola, only on young areolas, 3 to 4 mm long, flattened, soft, non-pungent, whitish and somewhat curved.

Aztekium ritteri blooms throughout the summer, from the young areoles at the apex, producing an abundance of white and pink flowers measuring less than 10 mm in diameter. The main pollinators are likely bees native to the same area of Mexico. The white flowers have a more or less pink central stripe and reach a diameter of 7 to 14 millimeters . These flowers are followed by small pink fruit that open when ripe and release tiny black seeds. Fruit small, pink almost white, membranous; It is included in the wool at the apex, where it bursts. Seeds pyriform, 0.5 mm long, with thickly tuberculated, black testa; broad basal thread, with very large arils.

There are usually two blooms each year, the first taking place in early summer and the other in midsummer (August in the Northern Hemisphere).

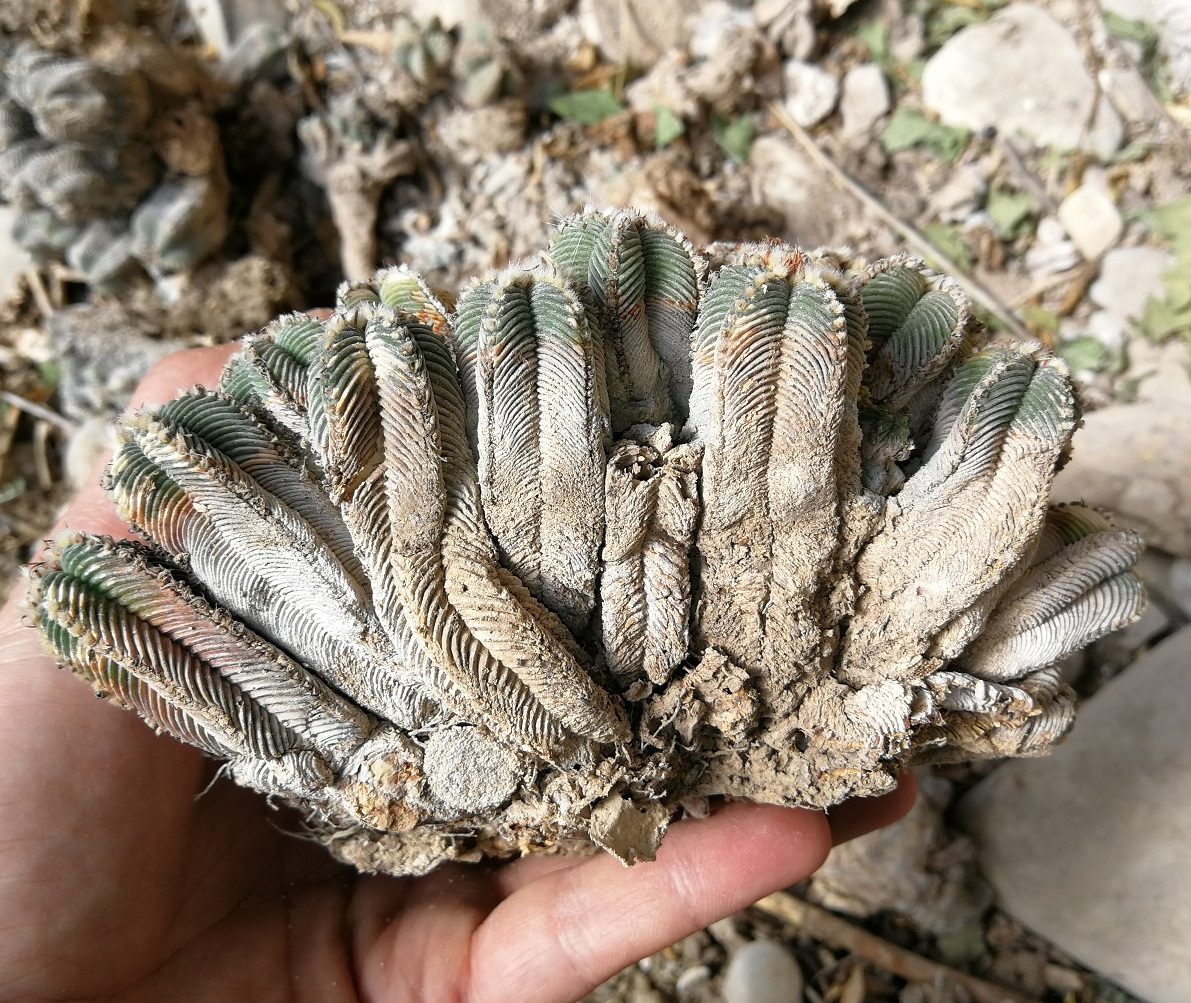
Plant side view

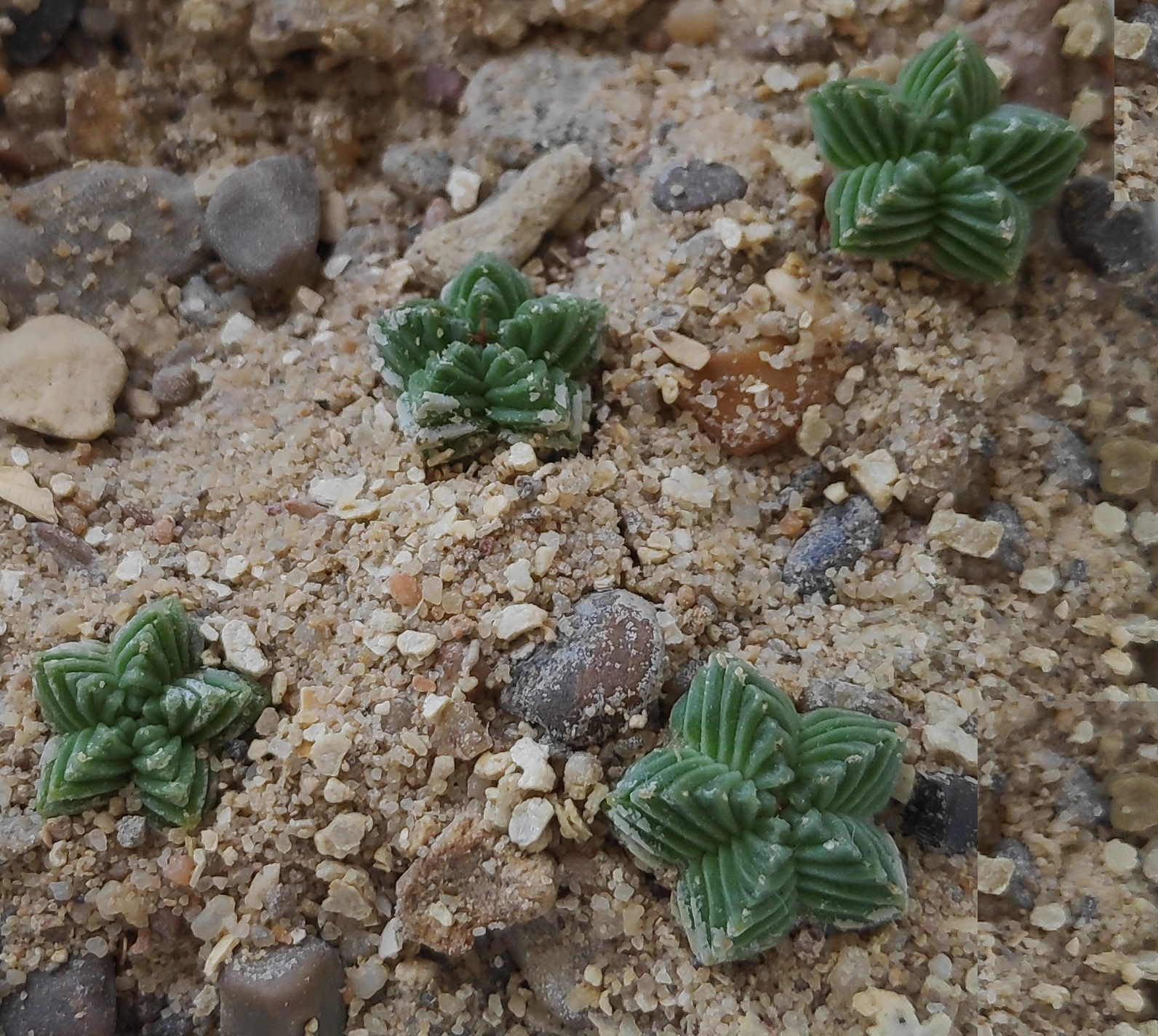
Plant

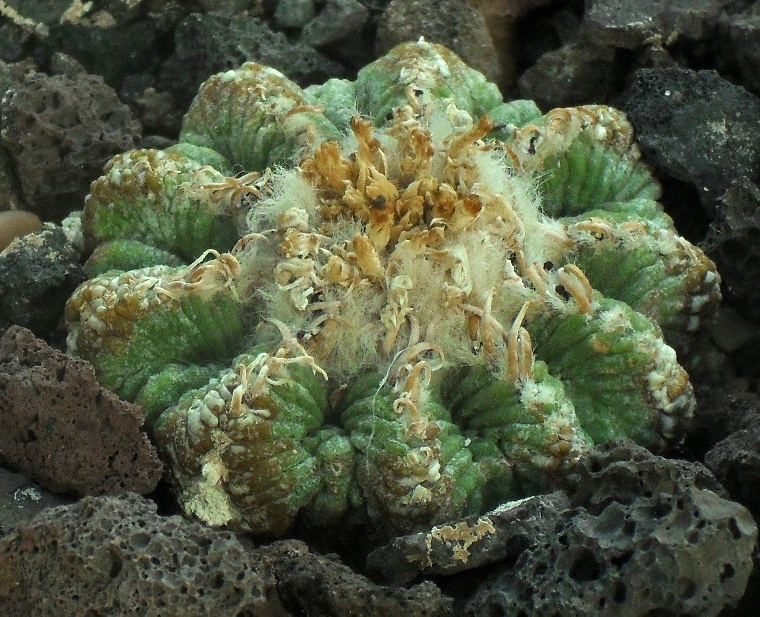
Plant top

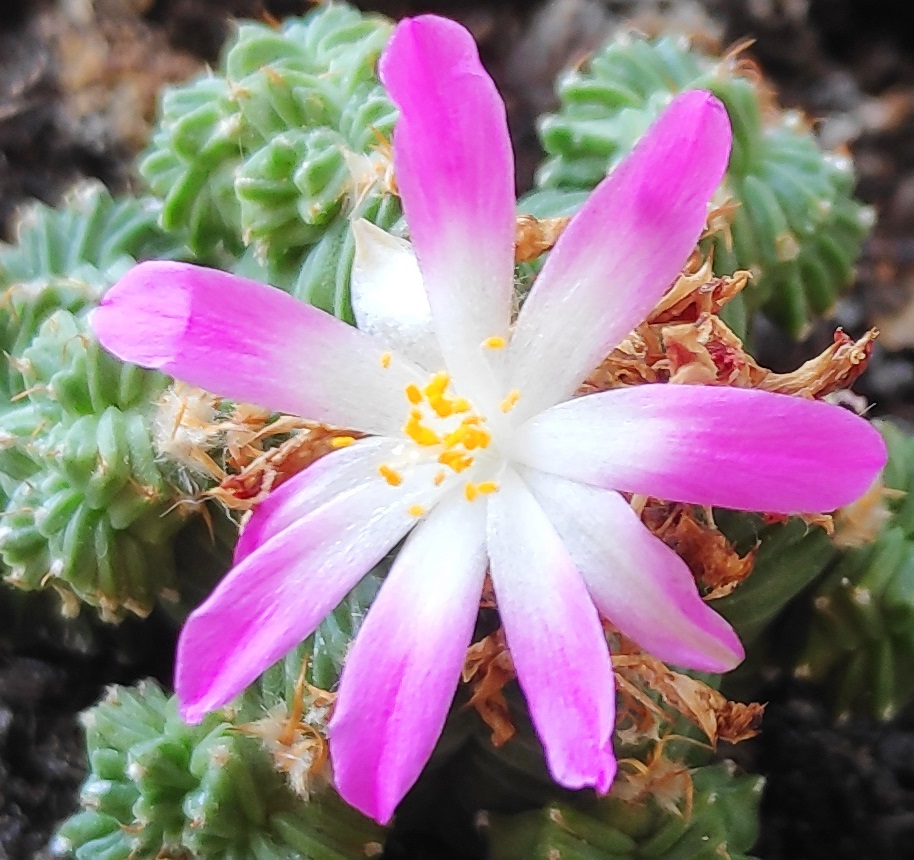
Flower

== Distribution ==
It is a cactus endemic to the Sierra Madre Oriental, in the state of Nuevo León, Mexico. It is distributed in the Rayones valley, between 850 and 1,045 m above sea level. It is located on Jurassic gypsum, middle and lower Cretaceous limestone, as well as Tertiary conglomerates. Plants grow with associated with Selaginella sp., there is an important relationship between Aztekium ritteri and Selaginella lepidophylla, which most likely plays a predominant role in promoting the germination of its tiny seeds. Where the average annual precipitation ranges between 300 and 800 mm. The types of vegetation surrounding their populations are submontane scrub (or subinermet scrub) and rosetophilous desert scrub. The habitat of this species is characterized by having slopes of nearly 90 degrees, in areas occupied by intermittent streams.

Plants are sensitive to cold, it does not tolerate frost. When cultivated, it reproduces through seeds, its growth is very slow, therefore it is often grafted to accelerate its maturity. Less water is added than for the average cactus. It is watered only in warm weather.

Other cacti that are distributed in the habitat of this species are: Neolloydia conoidea, Mammillaria candida, Mammillaria pilispina, Epithelantha micromeris, Opuntia stenopetala, Opuntia stricta, Thelocactus buekii ssp. matudae, Echinocereus viereckii ssp. huastescensis, Echinocereus pentalophus ssp. leonensis, among others.

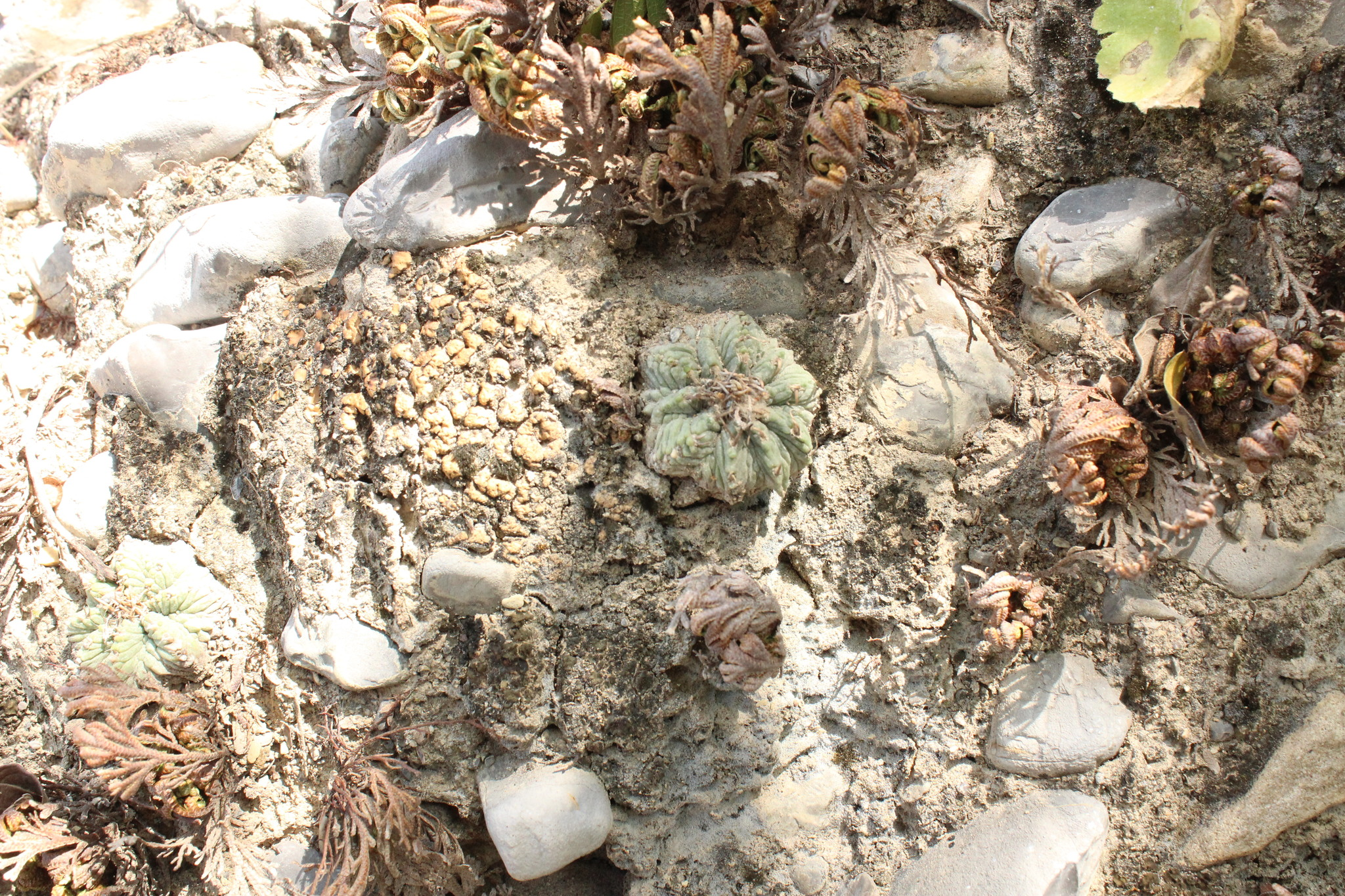
Habitat in Ignacio Zaragoza, Nuevo Leon, Mexico

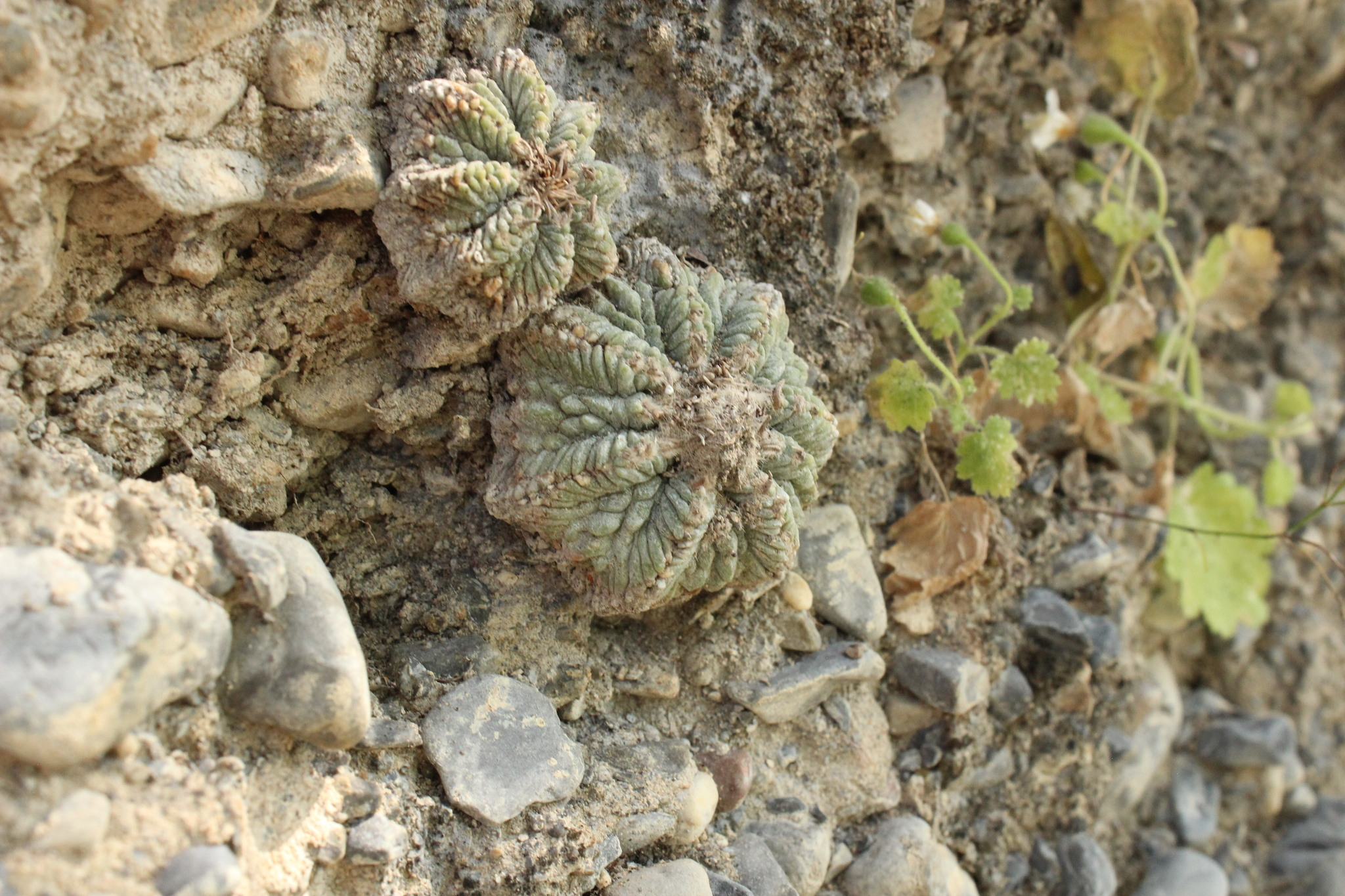
Plant growing in José María Morelos, Nuevo Leon, Mexico

== Taxonomy ==
The first description as Echinocactus ritteri by Friedrich Bödeker was published in 1928. A year later, Bödeker placed them in the genus Aztekium, which he had newly established.

== Uses ==
In Mexico, Aztekium ritteri is sometimes called “peyotillo.” However this name is likely given to this plant not for its psychoactive properties, but rather for its vague similarity to the button like form of peyote (Lophophora williamsii). Even though it contains N-methyltyramine, hordenine, anhalidine, mescaline, pellotine, and 3-methoxytyramine, there have been no ethnobotanical reports that state that it has ever been used by the indigenous people of the area.
