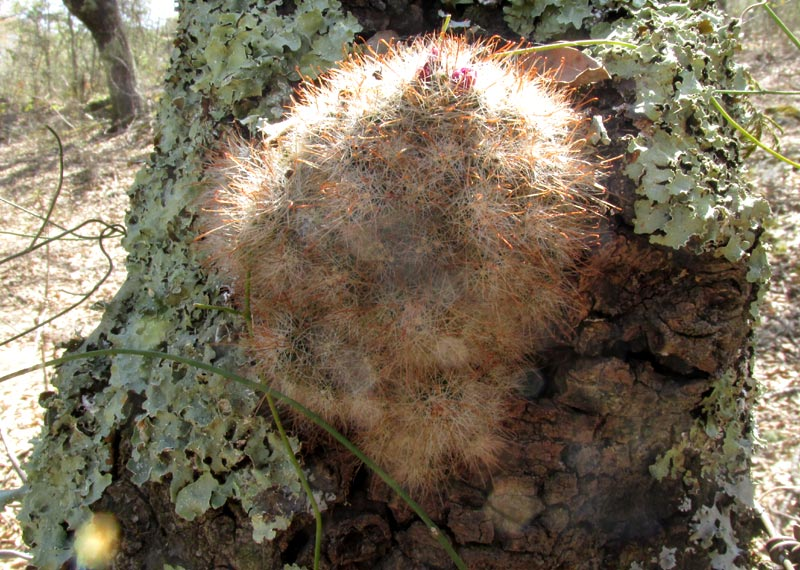
- Mammillaria erythrosperma, original body covered with numerous offsets growing so closely together that they all appear to be one cactus body

Conservation status
- Least Concern (IUCN 3.1)

Scientific classification
- Kingdom: Plantae
- Clade: Tracheophytes
- Clade: Angiosperms
- Clade: Eudicots
- Order: Caryophyllales
- Family: Cactaceae
- Subfamily: Cactoideae
- Genus: Mammillaria
- Species: M. erythrosperma

Binomial name
- Mammillaria erythrosperma Boed.

Synonyms
- List: Chilita erythrosperma (Boed.) Buxb.; Ebnerella erythrosperma (Boed.) Buxb.; Krainzia erythrosperma (Boed.) Doweld; Neomammillaria erythrosperma (Boed.) Y.Itô; Cactus scheidweilerianus (Otto) Kuntze; Chilita multiformis (Britton & Rose) Orcutt; Chilita scheidweileriana (Otto) Orcutt; Ebnerella multiformis (Britton & Rose) Buxb.; Ebnerella scheidweileriana (Otto) Buxb.; Mammillaria erythrosperma var. similis Boed.; Mammillaria multiformis (Britton & Rose) Backeb.; Mammillaria scheidweileriana Otto; Neomammillaria multiformis Britton & Rose; Neomammillaria scheidweileriana (Otto) Britton & Rose

= Mammillaria erythrosperma =

Species of plant

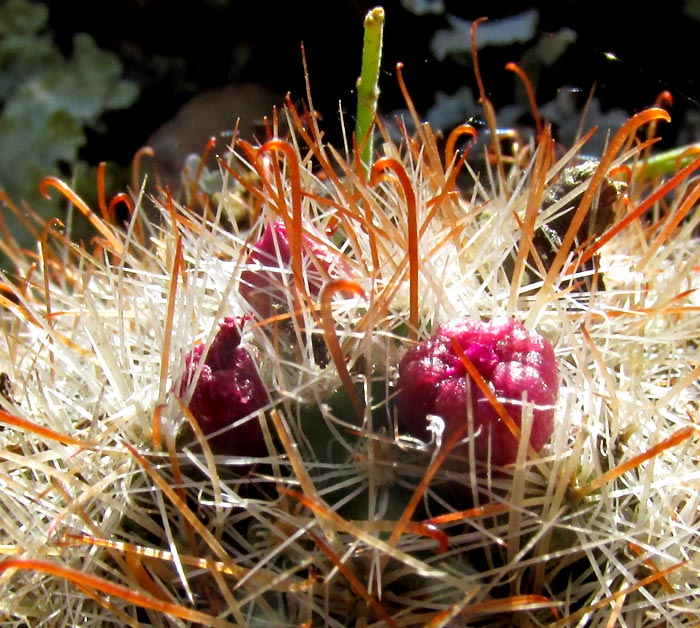
Flower buds among spines

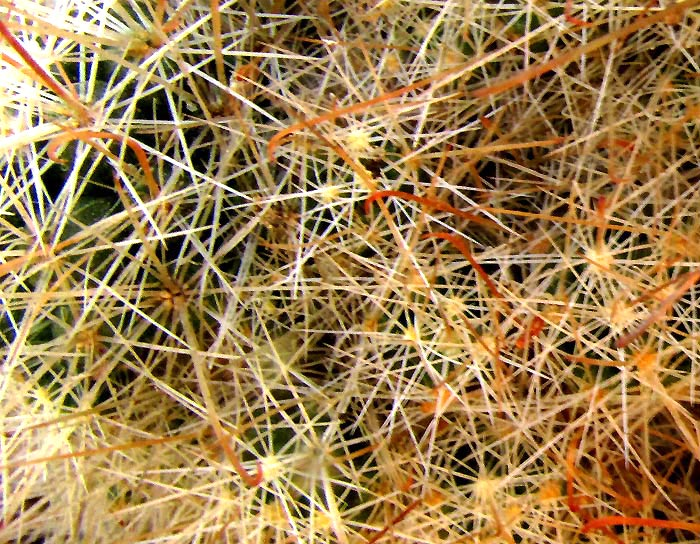
Hooked central spines and straight, slender radial ones

Mammillaria erythrosperma, with no widely used English name, though all Mammillaria species can be called pincushion or nipple cacti, is a small cactus native only to Mexico. It belongs to the family Cactaceae.

== Description ==
Here are key features of Mamillaria erythrosperma:

- As with all Mammillaria species, the body is unsegmented, with the surface broken into many "nipples," or tubercles. which remain distinct, not forming ribs.
- At first the succulent body is simple, up to 5 cm (2 in) in height and 4 cm (1 1/2 in) in diameter when mature. Normally it produces abundant offsets, or "pups," which at first may be very small. Initially these appear at the body's base but then may extend into the pits, or "axils," in the angles between the main body's upper tubercles. Sometimes all the closely growing bodies look like one much larger body. The individual body below the spines is glossy, dark green, but much paler in the axils.
- Axils between tubercles are somewhat woolly-hairy. Tubercles are arranged in 8-13 ascending files, and their bodies are fairly cylindrical, about 5 mm (3/16 in) thick and 10 mm (3/8 in) high.
- Spines arise from areoles atop each tubercle. The spines are clearly differentiated into "central spines," which point away from the cactus body's center, and "radial spines," which radiate outward horizontally from the central spines' bases. Though there can be up to four central spines, usually there is only one, which is thicker and stouter than the 15-20 "radial spines." Central spines are conspicuously hooked at their tips and are golden, while radial spines are very slender, paler and not hooked. Both spine types are up to 10 mm (3/8 in) long.
- Flowers are numerous, colored carmine red to magenta, with yellow stigmas. Corollas are around 15 mm (9/16 in) high and somewhat funnel-shaped.
- Fruits are funnel-shaped, carmine red and about 2 cm (13/16 in) long. Seeds are dark carmine-red to blackish.

== Distribution ==
Mammillaria erythrosperma is endemic only to the Mexican states of Guanajuato, Jalisco, Querétaro, San Luis Potosí, Tamaulipas and Zacatecas.

== Habitat ==
Mammillaria erythrosperma mainly occurs on limestone in moist, warm environments which are not too exposed to intense sunlight. Locally it may be found growing abundantly in limestone cracks.

== Conservation status ==
In a 2009 review for the Red List of Threatened Species of the IUCN, Mammillaria erythrosperma was designated as a Least-concern species. However, within the species' home country of Mexico, a 2010 designation by the governmental agency SEMARNAT designated it as Amenazadas, or Threatened.

== As an ornamental plant ==
Mammillaria erythrosperma is described as a very popular cactus because of its resistance and abundant flowering. Its maintenance is said to be very easy for beginners, provided that overwatering is strictly avoided. It is not toxic, but its hooked spines can cause injury to pets. In gardens and pots it should be grown in bright, indirect sunlight or filtered sun. Its soil should be a well-drained mineral mix enriched with plenty of pumice, course sand and perlite. If the soil is kept bone-dry, it can tolerate brief light frosts (down to −5 °C (23 °F)), but is best kept indoors in areas with prolonged freezing temperatures. The offsets can be separated from the parent, allowed to dry for a few days, and then planted in dry cactus soil.

== As a psychoactive plant ==
"Mammillaria erythrosperma" has been shown to contain an alkaloid that may have psychoactive properties.

== Taxonomy ==
In 1918 when Friedrich Bödeker formally described and named Mammillaria erythrosperma, he noted that he had first examined a plant of the species during a 1914 visit to "... De Laet in Contich." This was surely the prominent Belgian horticulturist and succulent expert Frans de Laet, who had a plant nursery in Kontich (old spelling Contich).

=== Phylogeny ===
A study of genomes in the chloroplasts of three of the eight subgenera of Mammillaria indicated that in this genus chloroplast genome structures appear not to be related to the morphology-based taxonomic classification. Molecular phylogenetic analysis using plastid markers showed that, of the species studied, Mammillaria erythrosperma and Mammillaria bocasana had a sister species relationship, and that this clade was sister to a group that included species from Mammillaria subgenus Mammillaria series Supertextae, which included Mammillaria supertexta, Mammillaria crucigera and Mammillaria solisioides.

=== Etymology ===
The genus name Mammillaria is based on the Latin mamilla, meaning "niple," rererring to the shape of the tubercles covering the bodies of Mammillaria species. Some species in the genus also produce milk-like latex.

The species name erythrosperma is constructed from the Greek erythros, meaning "red," and the Greek sperma, meaning "seed." When Friedrich Bödeker named Mammillaria erythrosperma, he explained that the name was chosen because of the seeds' peculiarly beautifully color, a seed color he had never observed anywhere else.
