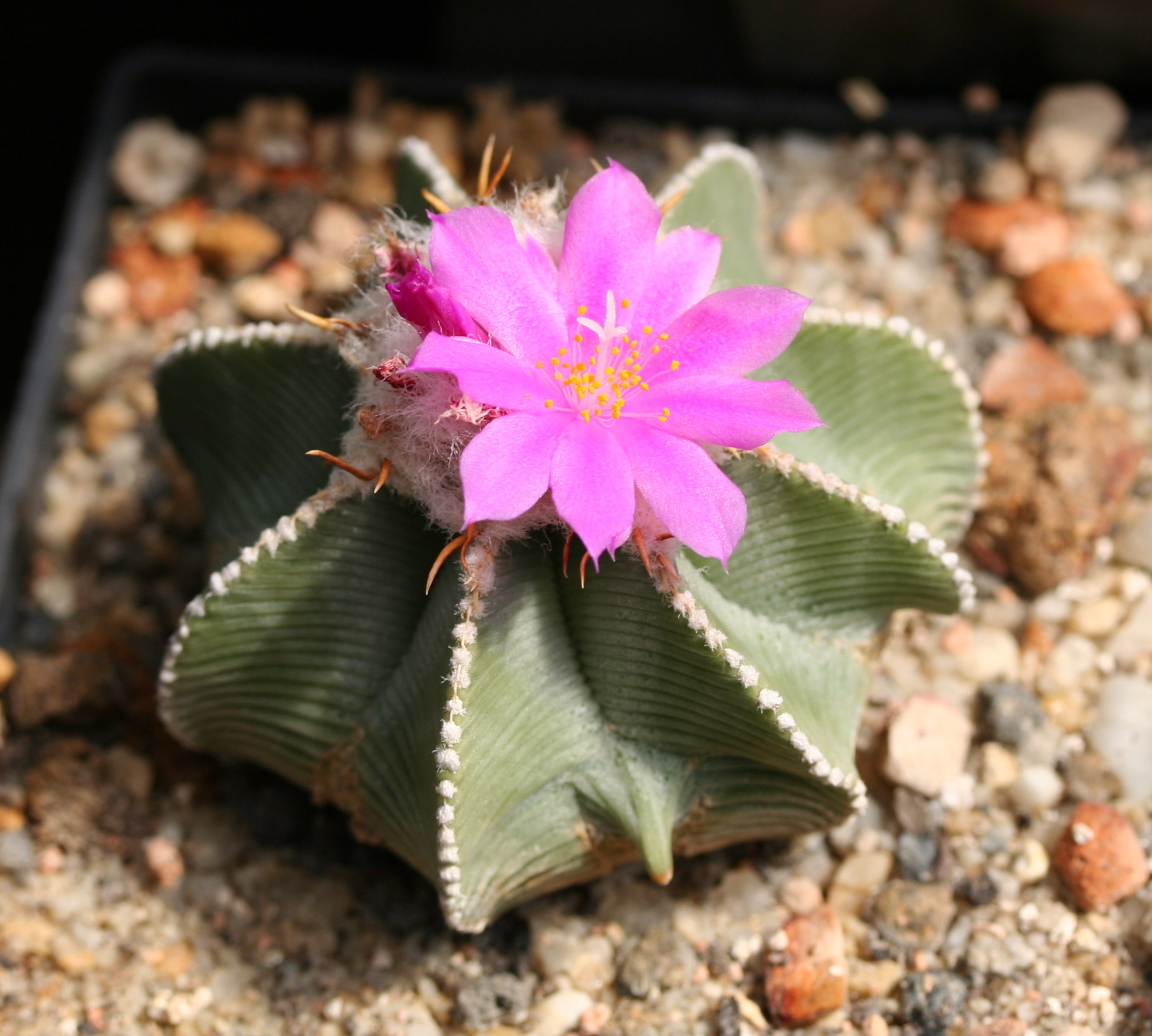
- Flowering specimen

Conservation status
- Near Threatened (IUCN 3.1)

Scientific classification
- Kingdom: Plantae
- Clade: Tracheophytes
- Clade: Angiosperms
- Clade: Eudicots
- Order: Caryophyllales
- Family: Cactaceae
- Subfamily: Cactoideae
- Genus: Aztekium
- Species: A. hintonii

Binomial name
- Aztekium hintonii Aztekium hintonii Glass & W.A.Fitz Maur.(1992)

Synonyms
- × Aztekonia hintonii (Glass & W.A.Fitz Maur.) Mottram 2014

= Aztekium hintonii =

Species of cactus

Aztekium hintonii, is a species of cactus in the genus Aztekium.

== Description ==
The specimens are small solitary plants with green to greyish-green, spherical to short columnar stem, up to 10 cm in diameter and 6-10 cm high. The 10 to 15 very sharp-edged and clearly pronounced ribs have numerous very fine, transverse wrinkles on their flanks. The ribs are 6 to 12 millimeters high and 3 to 4 millimeters wide. They become even wider with age. The 2-3 spines are strongly curved and are up to 13 millimeters long. The magenta-colored flowers reach a diameter of 1 to 3 centimeters. Red flowers 1-3 cm in diameter. Fruits elongated at the central apex.

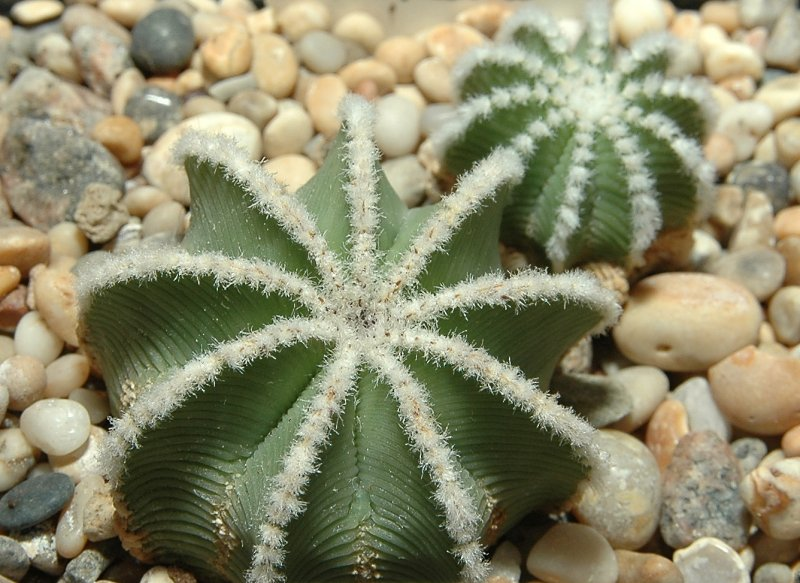

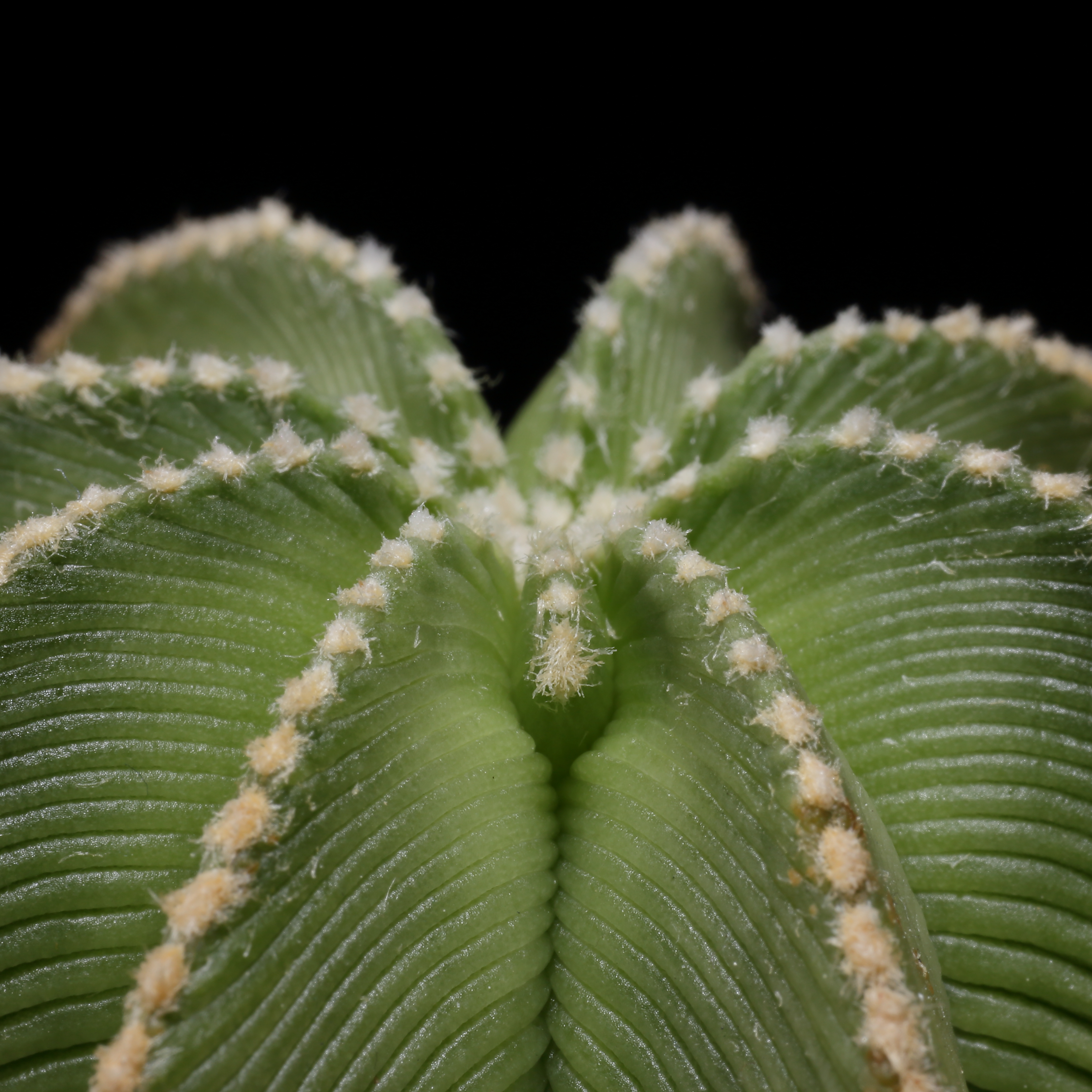

== Distribution ==
Aztekium hintonii is endemic to the north of the Sierra Madre Oriental, in the municipality of Galeana, Nuevo León. It lives from 1100 to 1200 m above sea level, on gypsum cliffs with xeric scrub, associated with other cacti (Mammillaria candida, Mammillaria pilispina, Mammillaria winterae, Thelocactus matudae, Neolloydia conoidea, Geohintonia mexicana) and other plants such as Selaginella gypsophila and Selaginella lepidophylla. Minimum average temperature 10 °C in full sun, little water, porous substrate with a high percentage of gypsum (calcium sulfate). They reproduce through seeds, they are grafted to accelerate their slow growth.

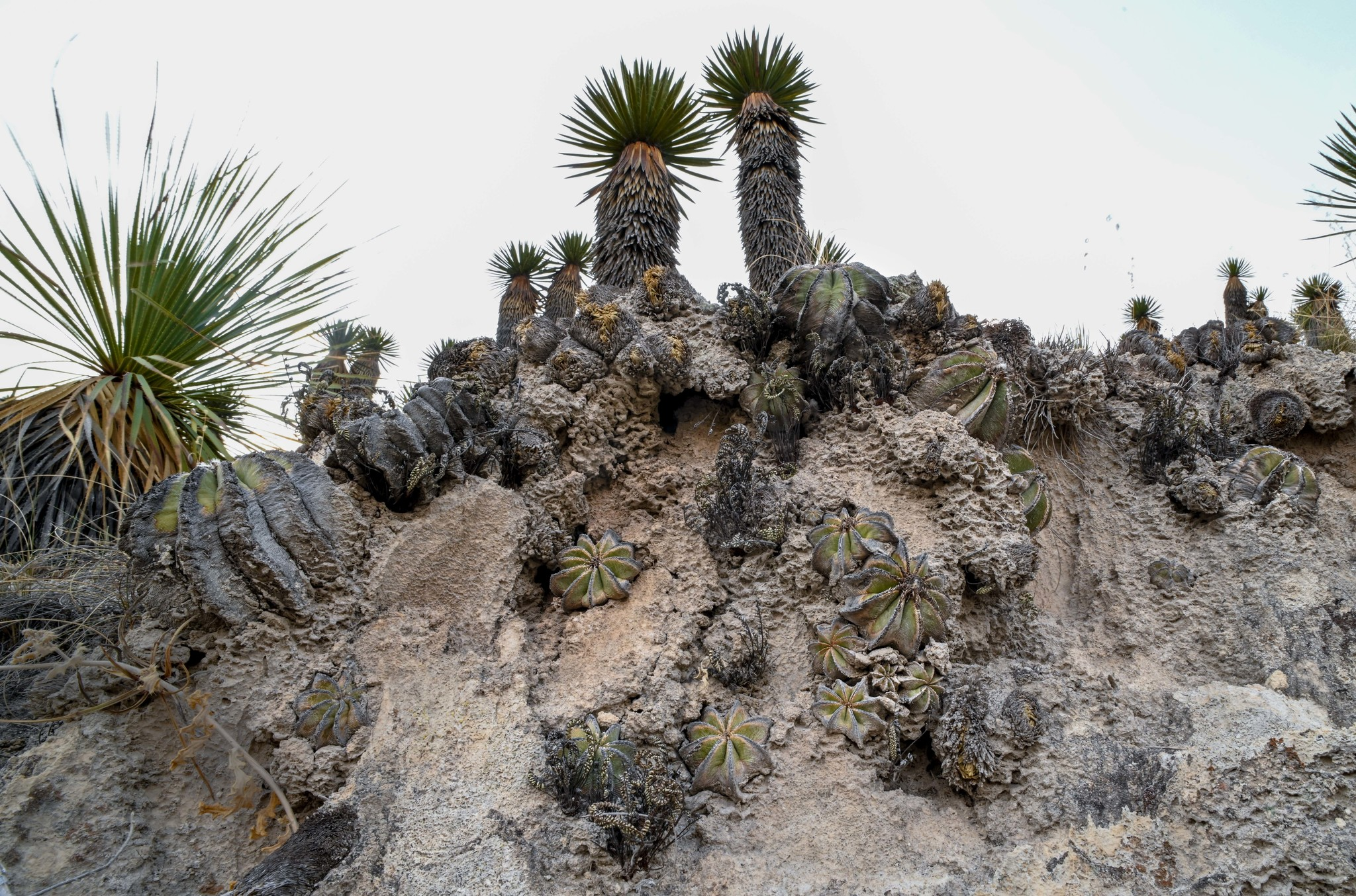
Plants growing in La Colorada, Nuevo Leon, Mexico

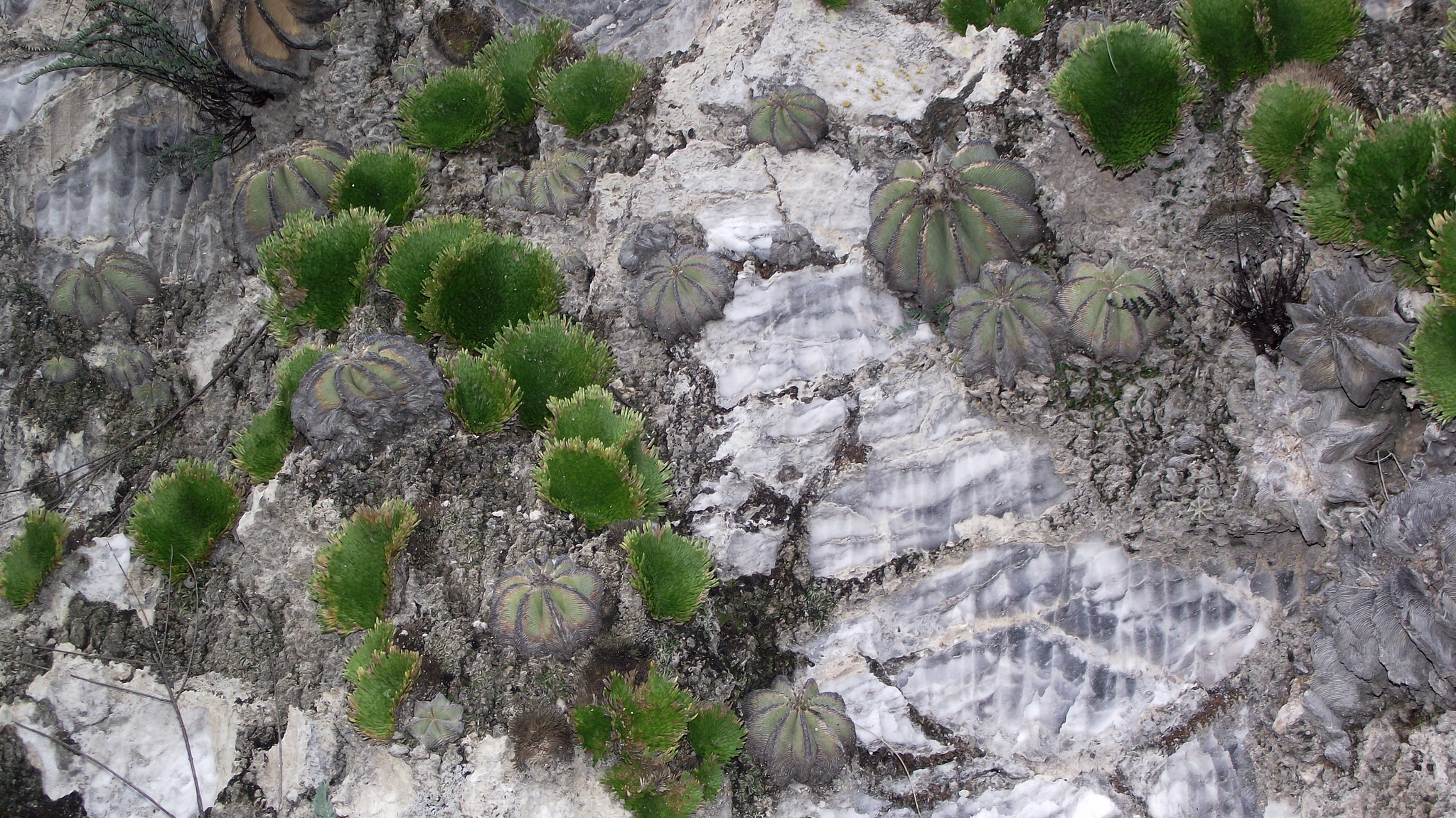
Plants growing in habitat along with Selaginella gypsophila

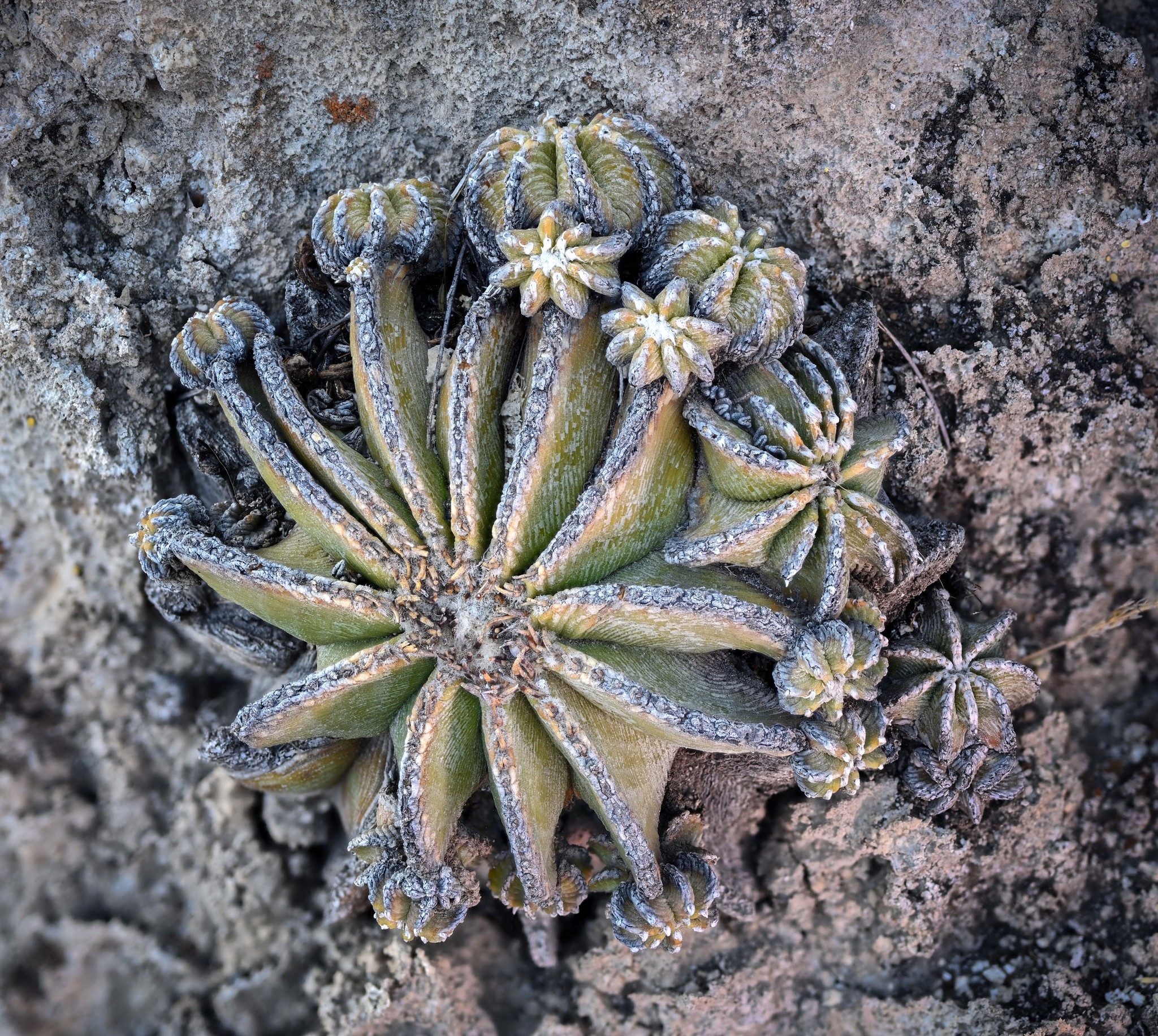
Closeup of habitat plant

== Taxonomy ==
Aztekium hintonii, a species discovered by George Sebastian Hinton, was scientifically described and published in 1992 by Charles Edward Glass and Walter Alfred Fitz Maurice in the journal Cactáceas y Suculentas Mexicanas.

== Cultivation ==
Aztekium hintonii is easier to grow than Aztekium ritteri, but it is easy to lose during first years due to mistakes in cultivation.
