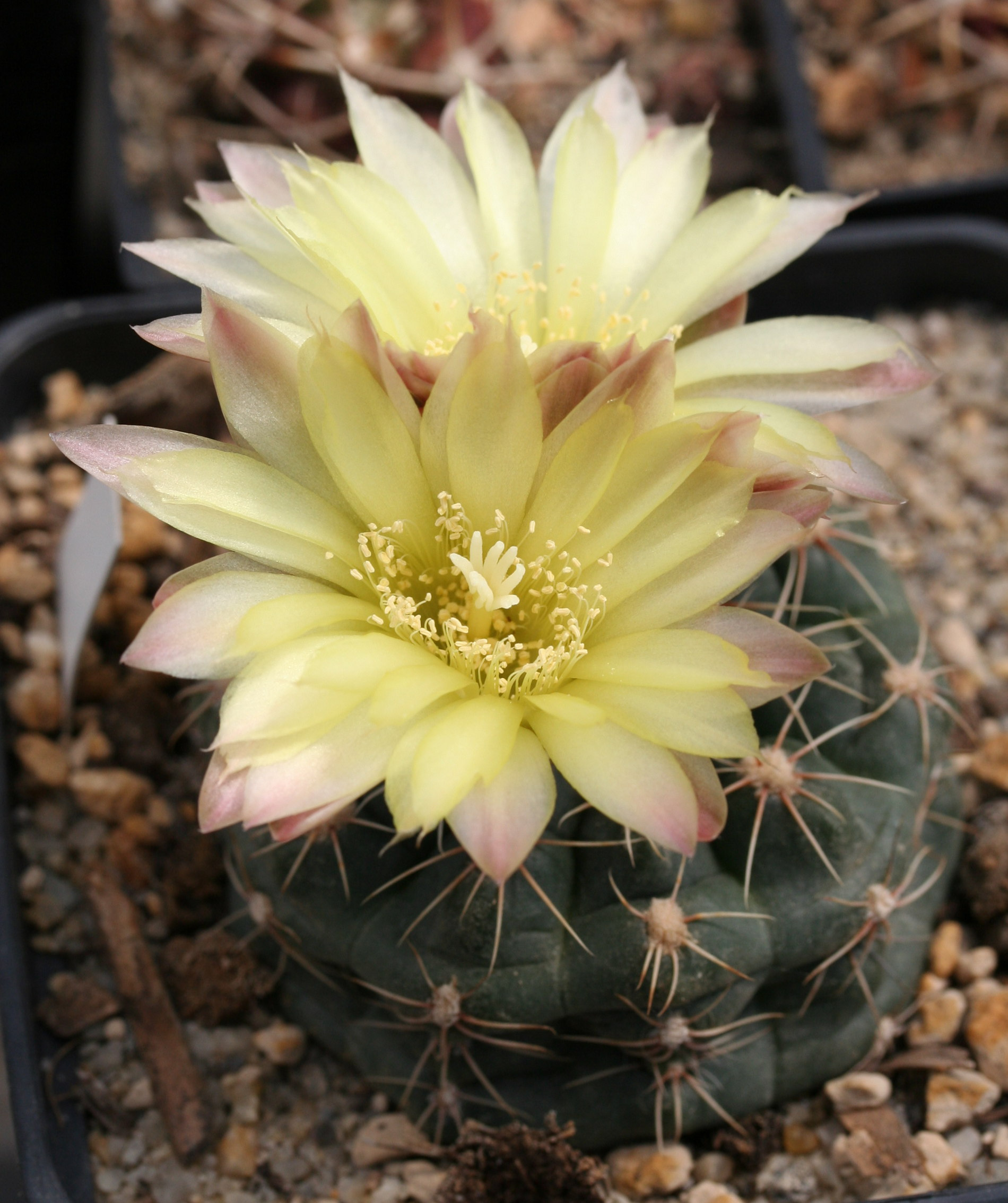

Conservation status
- Least Concern (IUCN 3.1)

Scientific classification
- Kingdom: Plantae
- Clade: Tracheophytes
- Clade: Angiosperms
- Clade: Eudicots
- Order: Caryophyllales
- Family: Cactaceae
- Subfamily: Cactoideae
- Genus: Gymnocalycium
- Species: G. andreae

Binomial name
- Gymnocalycium andreae (Boed.) Backeb. & F.M. Knuth 1935

= Gymnocalycium andreae =

Species of cactus

Gymnocalycium andreae is a species of Gymnocalycium from Argentina.

== Description ==
Gymnocalycium andreae often forms groups with diameters of up to 15 centimeters and more. The blue-green to blue-gray shoots are spherical, depressed spherical or sometimes short columnar and reach heights of up to 5 centimeters with diameters of 6 centimeters. A long beet root is formed. The eight to twelve rounded ribs are furrowed. The single central spine, sometimes missing, sometimes up to three are formed, is dark brown, slightly curved upwards to protruding and up to 1.3 centimeters long. The approximately six to ten, thin, spread out to comb-like adjacent or protruding marginal spines are 0.8 to 1.5 centimeters (rarely up to 4 centimeters) long. They are whitish and have a darker base.

The pale to bright sulfur yellow or white to light pink flowers are 4 to 5 centimeters in diameter and up to 4 centimeters long. The blue-green fruits are spherical to cylindrical and reach a diameter of up to 1.2 centimeters.

Time lapse of flowering of G. andreae

== Distribution ==
Gymnocalycium andreae is widespread in the Argentine provinces of Córdoba and San Luis at altitudes of 1500 to 2700 meters.

== Taxonomy ==
The first description as Echinocactus andreae was made in 1930 by Friedrich Bödeker. The specific epithet andreae honors the honorary member of the German Cactus Society, the German cactus specialist and cactus connoisseur Wilhelm Andreae from Bensheim. Curt Backeberg placed the species in the genus Gymnocalycium in 1936.
