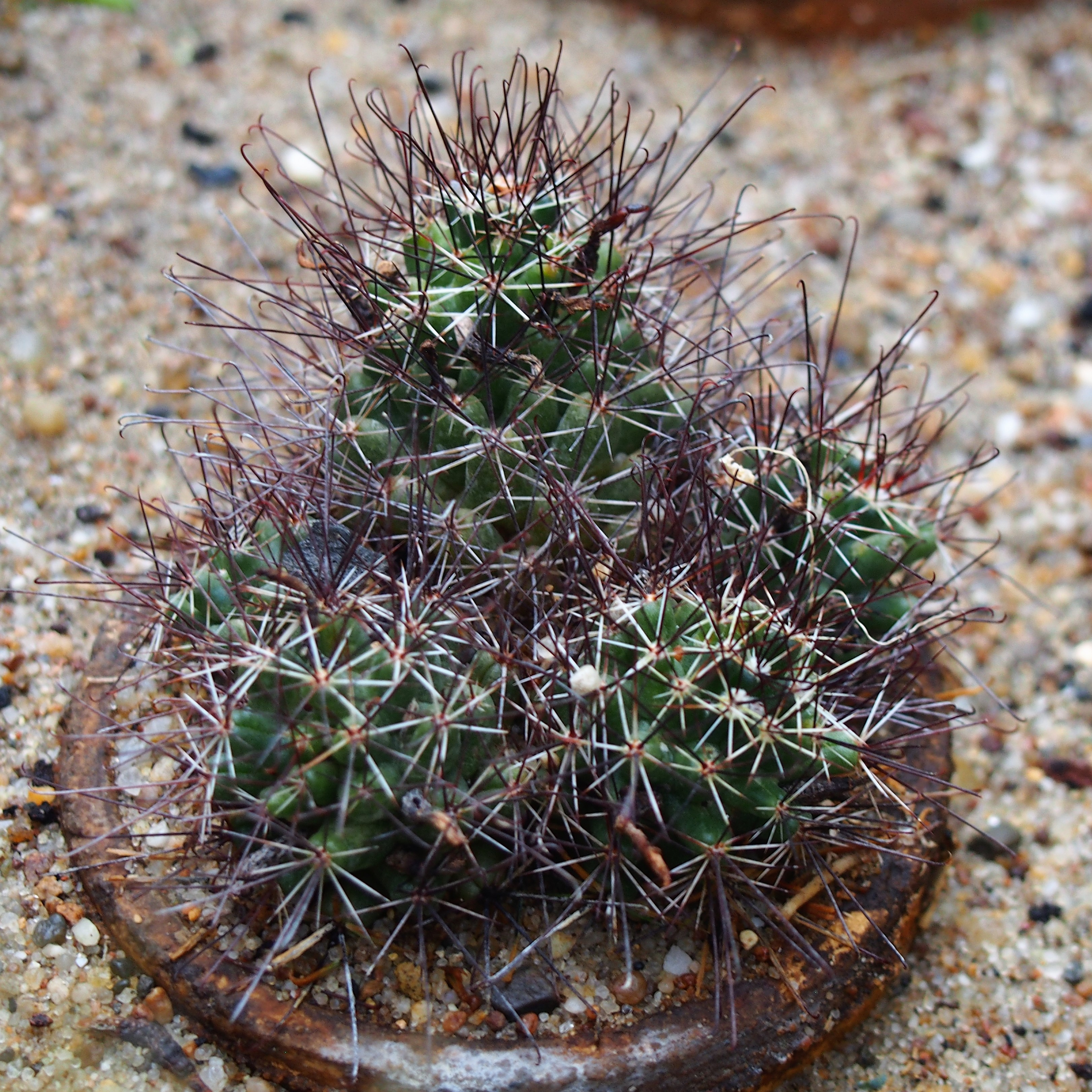

Conservation status
- Least Concern (IUCN 3.1)

Scientific classification
- Kingdom: Plantae
- Clade: Tracheophytes
- Clade: Angiosperms
- Clade: Eudicots
- Order: Caryophyllales
- Family: Cactaceae
- Subfamily: Cactoideae
- Tribe: Cacteae
- Genus: Cumarinia (Knuth) Buxb.
- Species: C. odorata

Binomial name
- Cumarinia odorata (Boed.) Buxb.

Synonyms
- Coryphantha odorata Boed. (basionym); Neobesseya odorata (Boed.) Borg; Neolloydia odorata (Boed.) Backeb.

= Cumarinia =

Genus of plants

Cumarinia odorata, commonly known in Spanish as biznaga partida olorosa (which translates as "fragrant split barrel cactus"), is a species of succulent flowering plant in the family. Cactaceae It is the only member of the monotypic genus Cumarinia. It is endemic to northeastern Mexico, where it is found in the states of San Luis Potosí, southern Nuevo León, and southwestern Tamaulipas. It is very small in size.

== Description ==
Cumarinia odorata is a species of small cactus that often forms irregular clumps with a few branches. The stems are globular or shortly cylindrical in shape, with a dark green epidermis. They grow to 4 cm in height and 3 cm in diameter, with a slightly sunken and glabrous apex.

The stems are covered in soft, flaccid cylindrical tubercles. They are blunt, with a shallow groove on top, and measure up to 1 cm in length and 0.4 cm in width. The axils are bare.

In cultivation

At the ends of the tubercles are areoles, which are covered in white wool when young. These have 3-4 strongly hooked central spines, which are black or dark reddish to yellow in color and 2-2.5 cm long. There are also 7-9 radial spines, which are white or yellow with a brown tip and measure 0.8-1 cm in length.

Plant in flower

The small, funnel-shaped flowers open during the day. They are narrow and yellow-pink in color. The flowers first appear at an early stage of the plant's life and are self-fertile. They measure 1.5-2 cm in length and 0.8-1.2 cm in diameter. The stamens are inserted in two rows, and have white filaments and golden-yellow coffee bean-shaped anthers.

The fruits are small, narrow, and cylindrical. They are light green in color with a slight pinkish tint, and measure 1.5-2 cm in length. Inside the fruit, the black seeds are egg-shaped and laterally compressed.

== Distribution and habitat ==
This species is native to northeastern Mexico, specifically to San Luis Potosí, southern Nuevo León, and southwesterm Tamaulipas, where it is mainly found in desert or dry scrubland biomes.

It grows on limestone slopes and canyons at altitudes of 670 to 1430 meters above sea level.

== Taxonomy ==
Cumarinia odorata was first described as Coryphantha odorata, a name published in 1930 by the German botanist Friedrich Boedeker in the scientific journal Monatsschrift der Deutschen Kakteen-Gesellschaft 2: 169.

Later, the Austrian botanist Franz Buxbaum moved this species into its own monotypic genus, Cumarinia, renaming it Cumarinia odorata. He registered these changes in the scientific journal Oesterreichische Botanische Zeitschrift 98: 87, published in 1951.

Etymology

- Cumarinia: the genus name refers to the odor of this genus' flowers, which is reminiscent of the sweet and herbaceous-smelling organic compound coumarin.
- odorata: the specific epithet is derived from the Latin word ŏdōrātus (meaning "odorous" or "fragrant"), referring to this species' fragrant flowers.

== Conservation status ==
On the IUCN Red List, Cumarinia odorata is classified as being of Least Concern (LC).

There are no known significant threats to the survival of this species, although certain populations are affected by habitat destruction associated with excessive grazing of goats and fluorite mining in the area.

== Cultivation ==
This species is cultivated primarily as an ornamental. It may be propagated vegetatively via cuttings, or via seeds.

It needs full sun exposure to fully develop and flower at an early age. It is sensitive to rot due to overwatering, and it therefore must be grown in a well-draining substrate. Furthermore, it can tolerate relatively low temperatures (down to −5 °C / 23 °F) so long as its substrate is kept dry.
