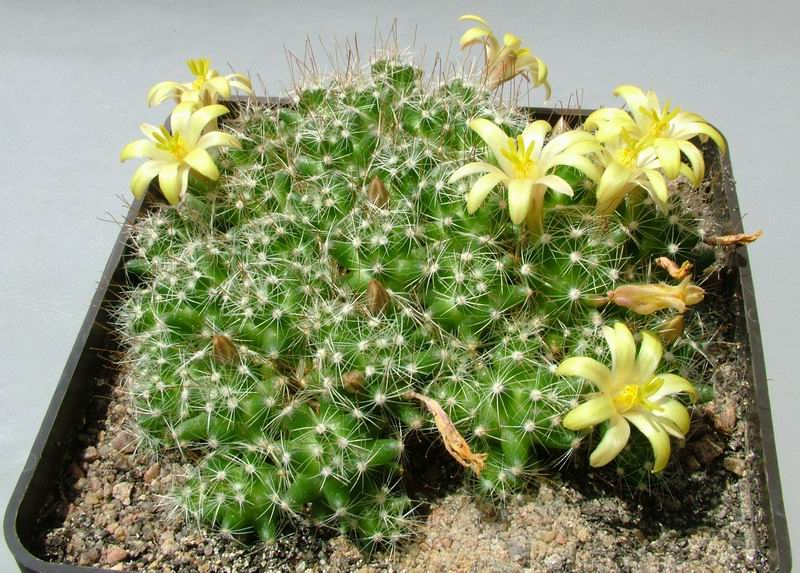

Conservation status
- Endangered (IUCN 3.1)

Scientific classification
- Kingdom: Plantae
- Clade: Tracheophytes
- Clade: Angiosperms
- Clade: Eudicots
- Order: Caryophyllales
- Family: Cactaceae
- Subfamily: Cactoideae
- Genus: Mammillaria
- Species: M. surculosa

Binomial name
- Mammillaria surculosa Boed.

= Mammillaria surculosa =

Species of cactus

Mammillaria surculosa is a species of flowering plant in the cactus family Cactaceae, native to north eastern Mexico, where it occurs in extremely isolated patches at altitudes of 950–1,200 m (3,120–3,940 ft). It is registered as "Endangered" by the IUCN Red List. Growing to 10 cm (3.9 in) tall by 50 cm (20 in) wide, this tiny plant forms colonies of spiny stems with relatively large, lemon yellow flowers in spring.

The Latin specific epithet surculosa means "producing suckers".

In cultivation this plant needs to be grown in a sharply-drained medium with a low nutrient content, at a minimum temperature of 1 °C (34 °F). In the United Kingdom, where it is best grown under glass due to high precipitation, it has gained the Royal Horticultural Society's Award of Garden Merit.

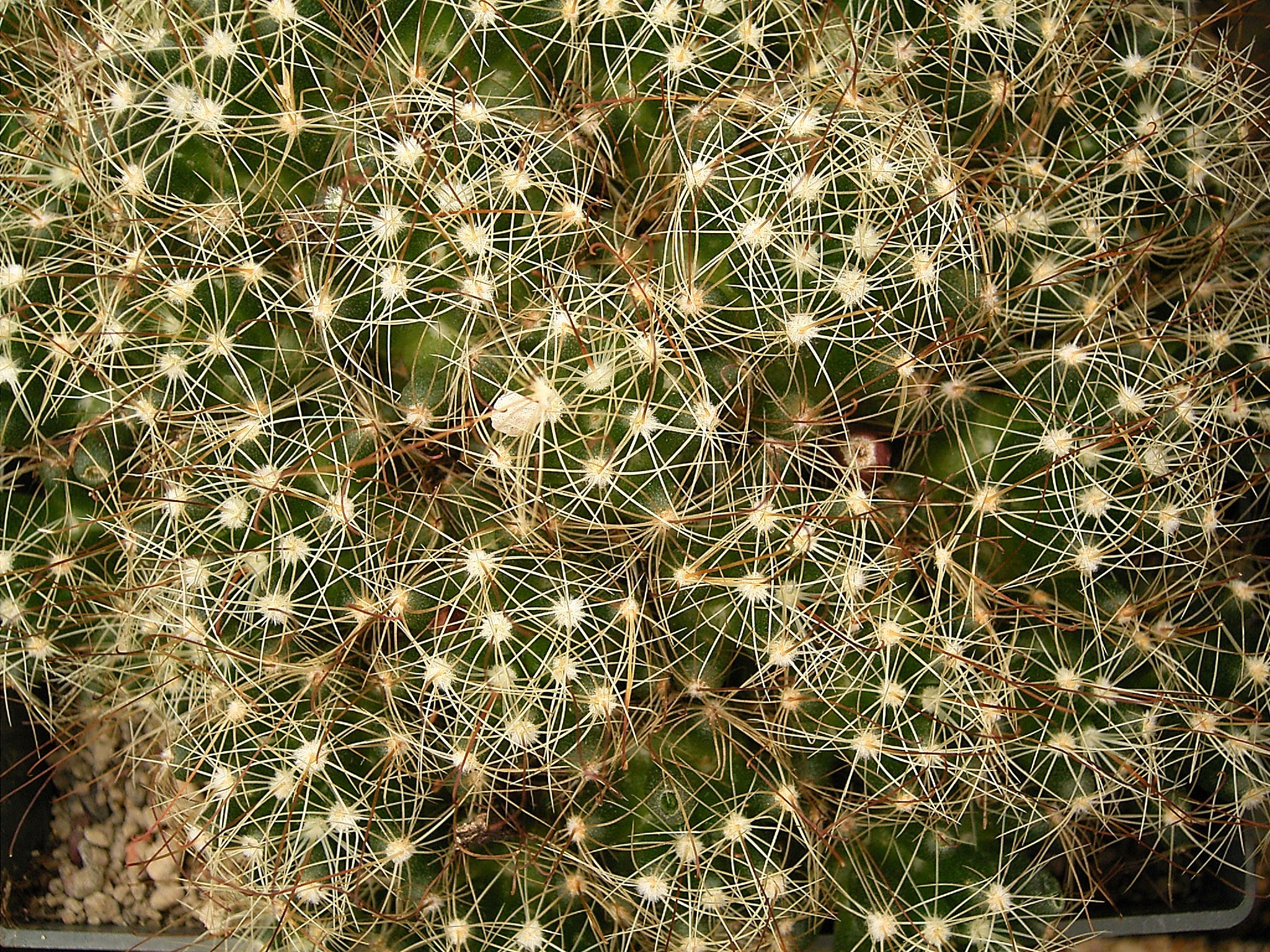

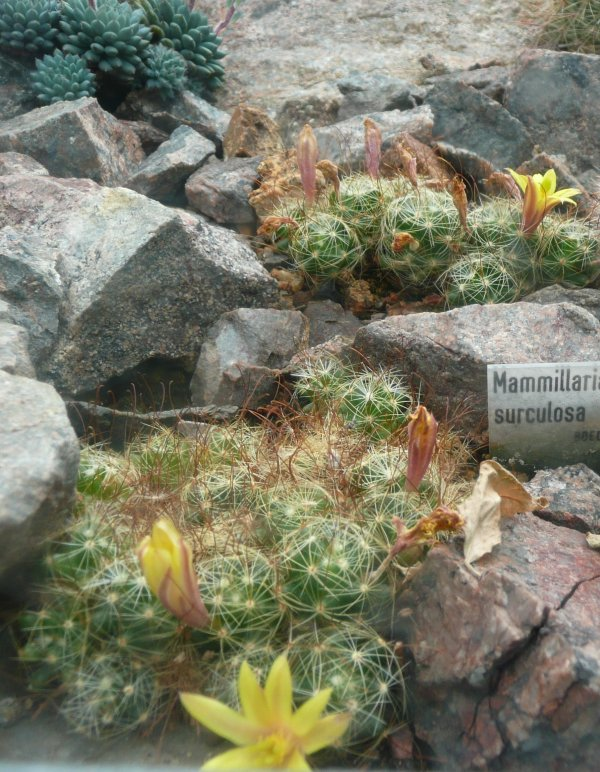
