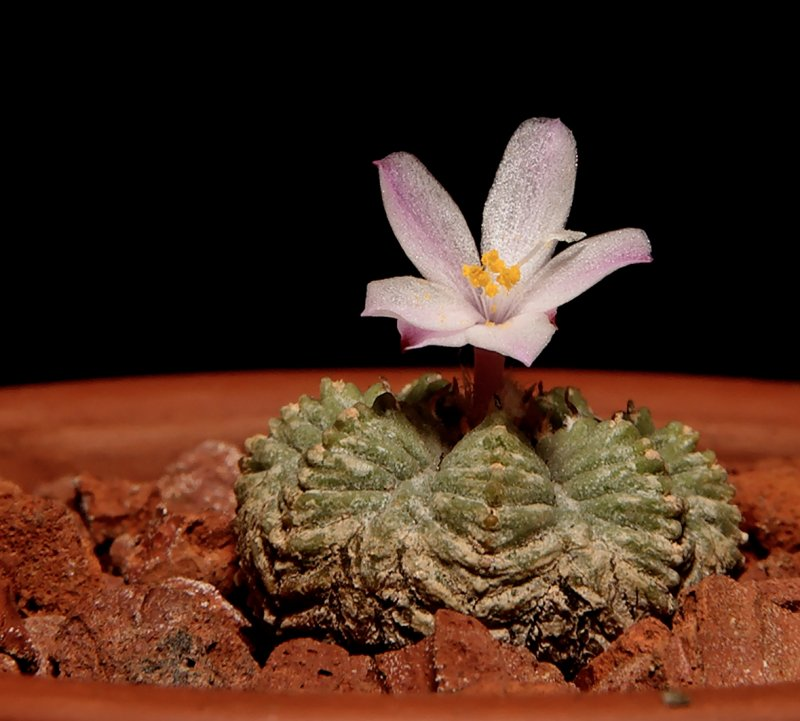
- Aztekium ritteri

Scientific classification
- Kingdom: Plantae
- Clade: Tracheophytes
- Clade: Angiosperms
- Clade: Eudicots
- Order: Caryophyllales
- Family: Cactaceae
- Subfamily: Cactoideae
- Tribe: Cacteae
- Genus: Aztekium; Boed.

Species
- A. hintonii Glass & Fitz Maurice; A. ritteri (Boed.) Boed.

= Aztekium =

Genus of cacti

The genus Aztekium contains two species of small globular cactus. Collected in 1929 by F. Ritter, in Rayones, Nuevo León, Mexico, this genus was thought to be monotypic (with Aztekium ritteri) until a second species (Aztekium hintonii) was identified by George S. Hinton, in Galeana, Nuevo León in 1991. A further possible species, Aztekium valdezii, was described in 2011, but is considered to be a synonym of A. ritteri.

== Description ==
Aztekium ritteri is a plant that is around 20 mm wide, with 9 to 11 ribs, which typically have transverse wrinkles. Its color varies from pale green to grayish-green. The center of the cactus contains white wool. Flowers are less than 10 mm wide, with white petals and pinkish sepals. The plants bear pinkish berry-like fruit. A. hintonii is larger, to 10 cm in diameter, 10 to 18 grooved ribs, flowers magenta to 3 cm. It grows only on gypsum.

== Species ==
Image	Scientific name	Distribution
	Aztekium hintonii	Nuevo León, Tamaulipas
	Aztekium ritteri	Northeast Mexico

== Etymology ==
Its name is dedicated to the Aztec people, due to the resemblance between the plant's shape and certain Aztec sculptures.

== Distribution ==
This genus is found only in the states of Nuevo León and Tamaulipas in Mexico. It was estimated that there were in the order of tens of millions of plants of A. hintonii, and at present most of its range is pristine. Though A. ritteri has been collected for decades and there has been destruction of its habitat, the number of plants in habitat is several million.

== Cultivation ==
These species grow extremely slowly, taking around two years to attain a diameter of 3 mm. They are usually propagated by seeds.

== Phytochemistry ==
The plants contain the following compounds:

- N-methyltyramine
- hordenine
- anhalidine
- mescaline
- N,N-3,4-dimethoxy-phenethylamine
- pellotine
- 3-methoxytyramine
