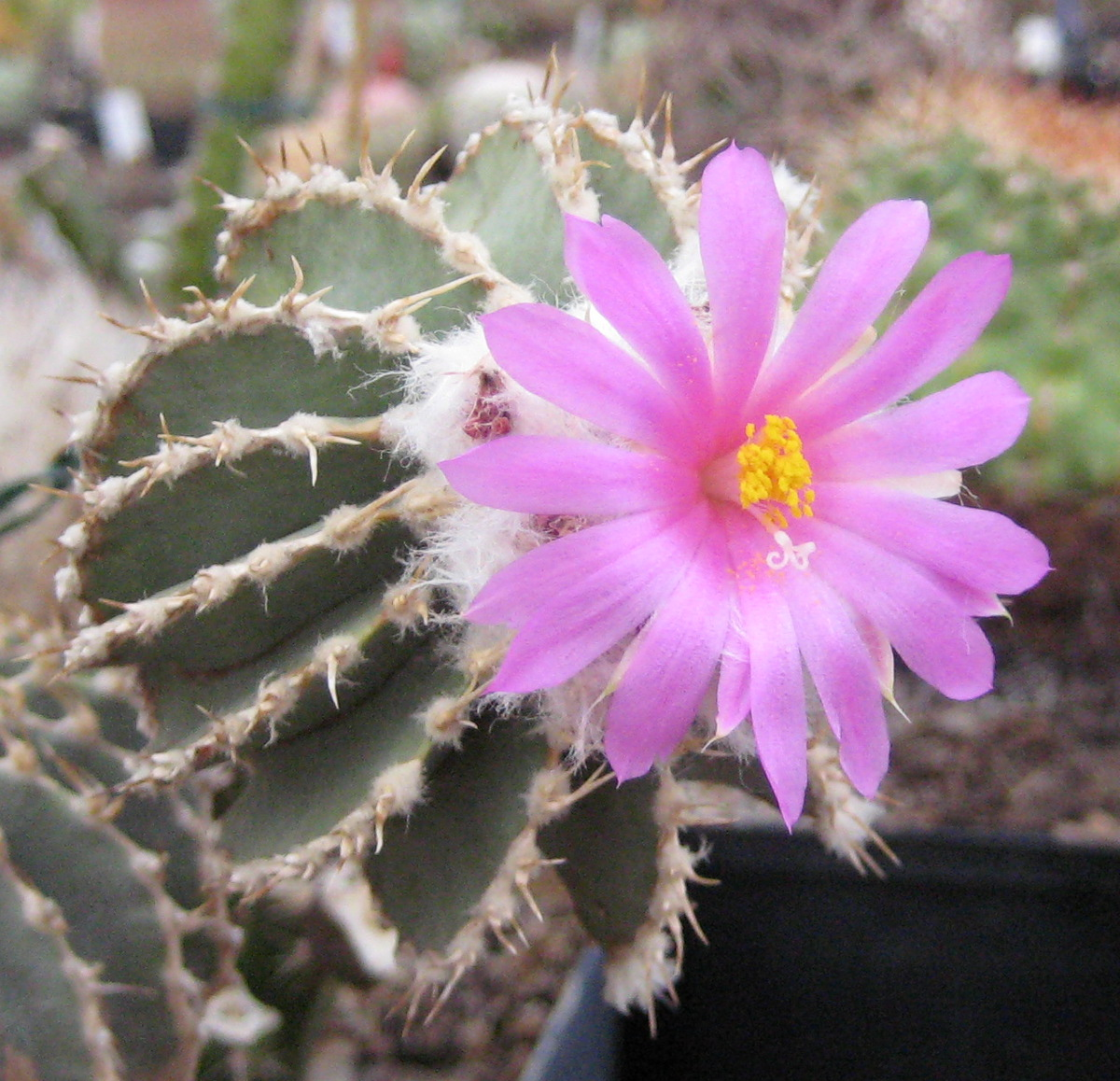

Conservation status
- Near Threatened (IUCN 3.1)

Scientific classification
- Kingdom: Plantae
- Clade: Tracheophytes
- Clade: Angiosperms
- Clade: Eudicots
- Order: Caryophyllales
- Family: Cactaceae
- Subfamily: Cactoideae
- Genus: Geohintonia; Glass & W.A.Fitz Maur.
- Species: G. mexicana

Binomial name
- Geohintonia mexicana Glass & W.A.Fitz Maur.

Synonyms
- Aztekium mexicanum (Glass & W.A.Fitz Maur.) Barmon & Corman 2015; Echinocactus mexicanus (Glass & W.A.Fitz Maur.) Halda 2000

= Geohintonia =

Genus of cacti

Geohintonia mexicana (discovered in 1992) is a species of cacti, the only species in the genus Geohintonia. This genus is named after its discoverer George S. Hinton. As its specific epithet suggests, the plant is found in Mexico (Nuevo León), where it grows on gypsum hills near Galeana.

== Description ==
It is a solitary, globose plant, slowly becoming columnar, up to 11 cm tall and 10 cm in diameter. grayish bluish green has between 18 and 20 very prominent ribs. The ribs have large wooly areoles with 3 curved spines about 3 to 15 mm long, yellowish in color. The hot pink, funnel-shaped flowers emerge at the apex and open after dark. The flowers are 2 to 4 cm in diameter and appear at the apex. They are open during the day and are pink to magenta in color. Fruits are ovoid 9 x 4-5 mm

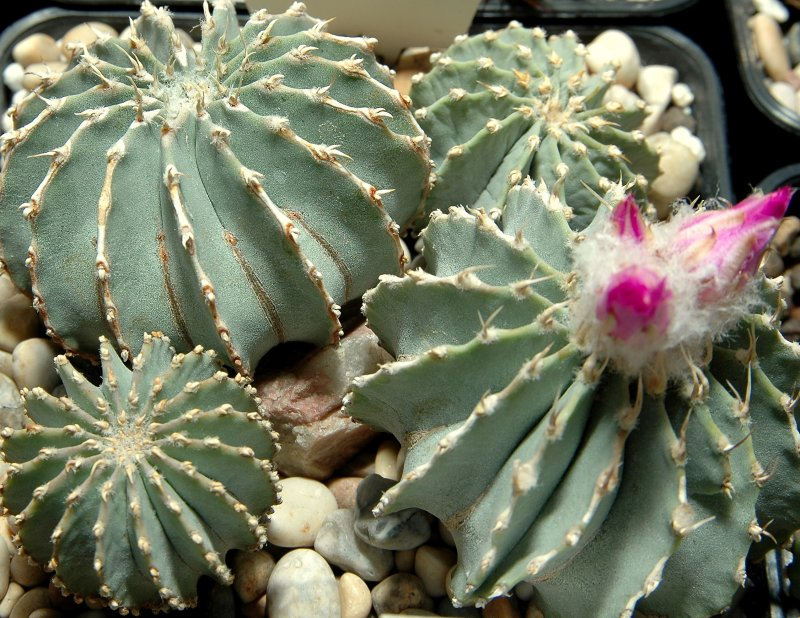
Plant

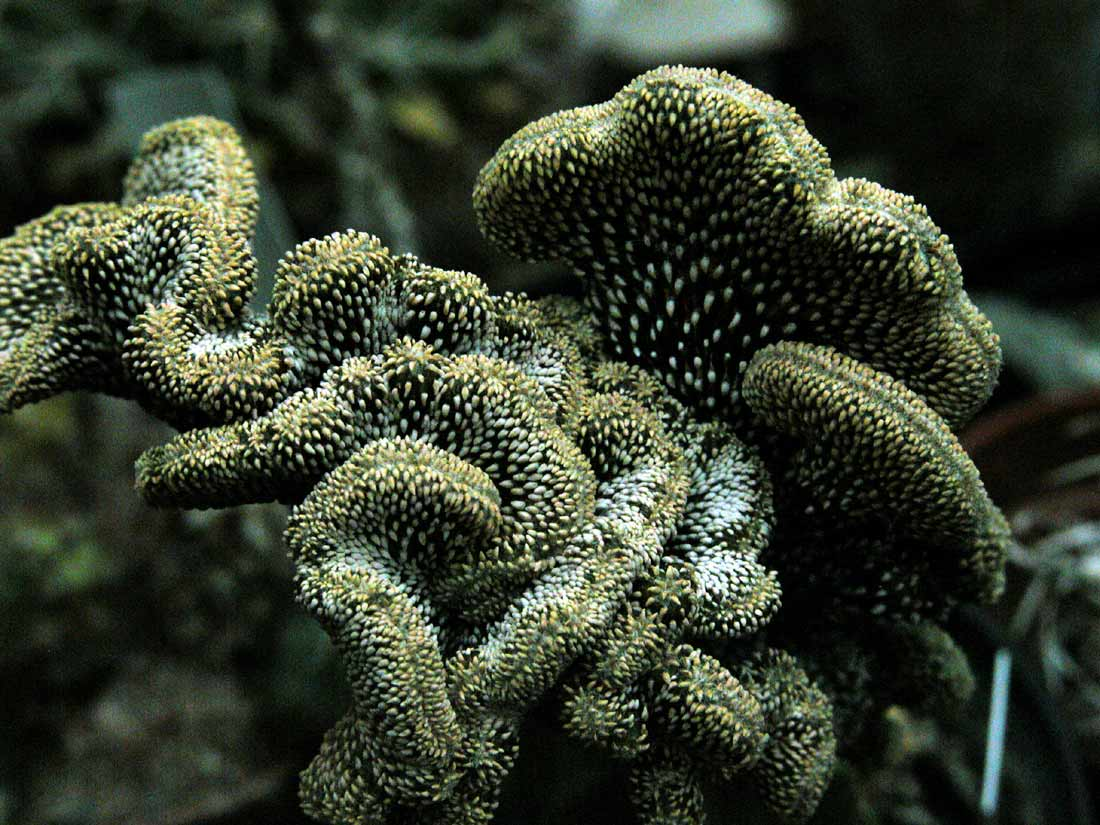
Geohintonia mexicana f. cristata

== Distribution ==
The plants grow exclusively in Mexico in the state of Nuevo León on gypsum hills at 1200 to 1350 meters. Aztekium hintonii and Selaginella gypsophila can also be found at the site. It is thought that the species may have arisen from a natural hybrid with Aztekium hintonii as one parent.

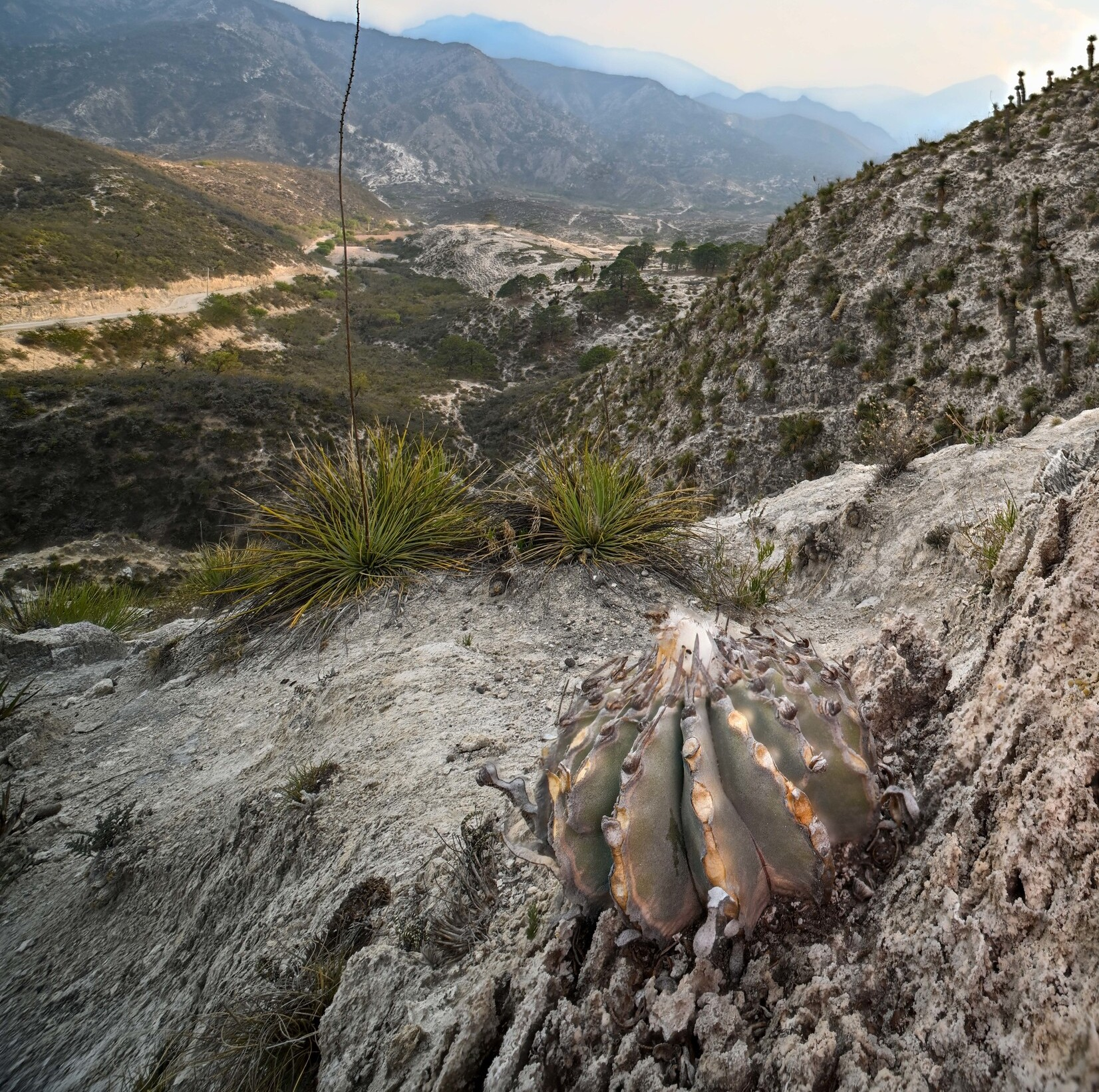
Habitat in Cuevas, Nuevo Leon, Mexico

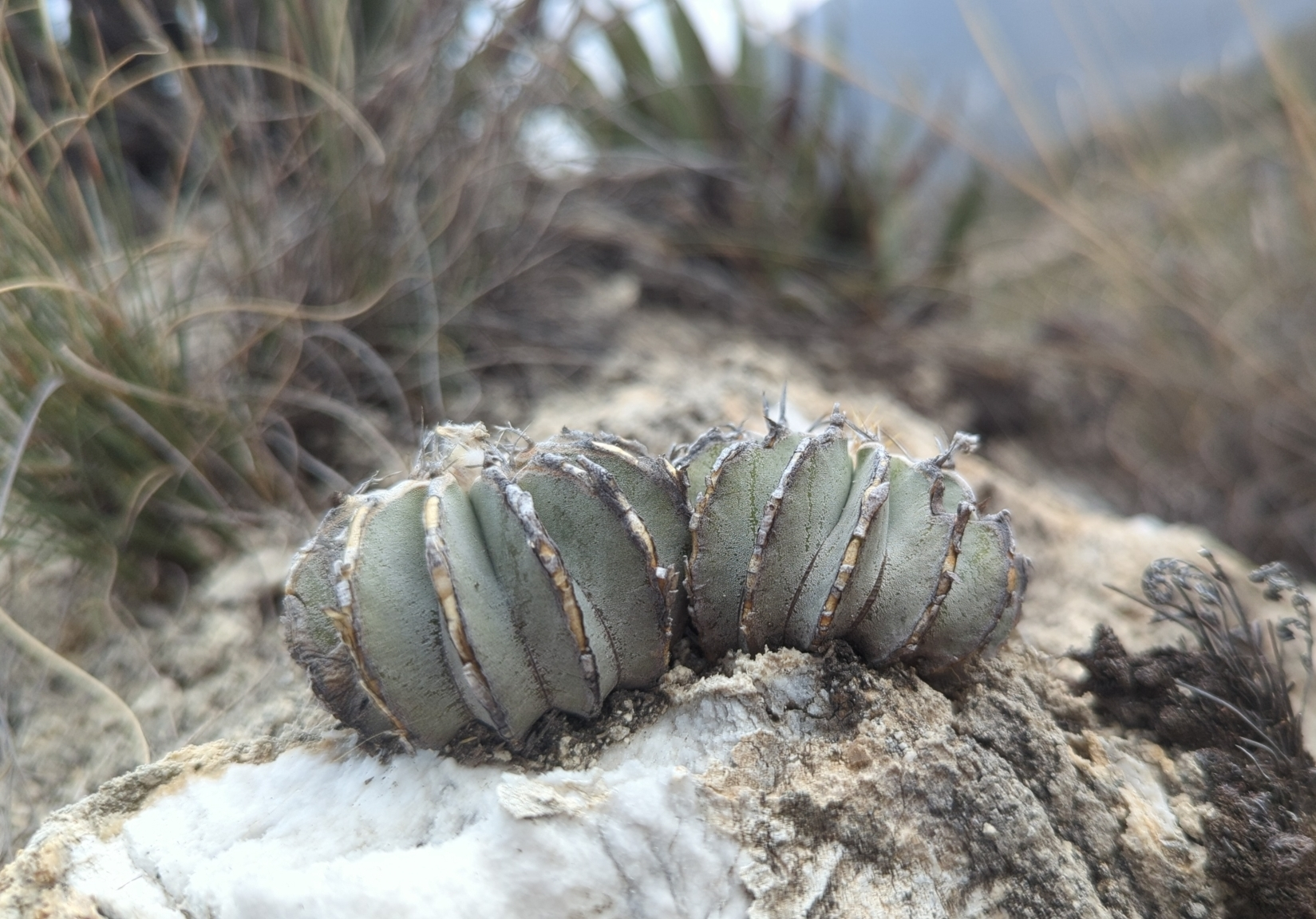
Plant growing in Cuevas, Nuevo Leon, Mexico

Geohintonia mexicana (top 3 plants, glaucous) growing together with Aztekium hintonii (bottom 3 plants, more yellow-green) in habitat

== Taxonomy ==
The plants were discovered by George S. Hinton in 1991 and the genus and species were first described in 1992 by Charlie Glass and Walter A. Fitz-Maurice. A nomenclature synonym was created through an unaccepted recombination in 2000 to Echinocactus mexicanus (Glass & W.A.Fitz Maurice) Halda.
