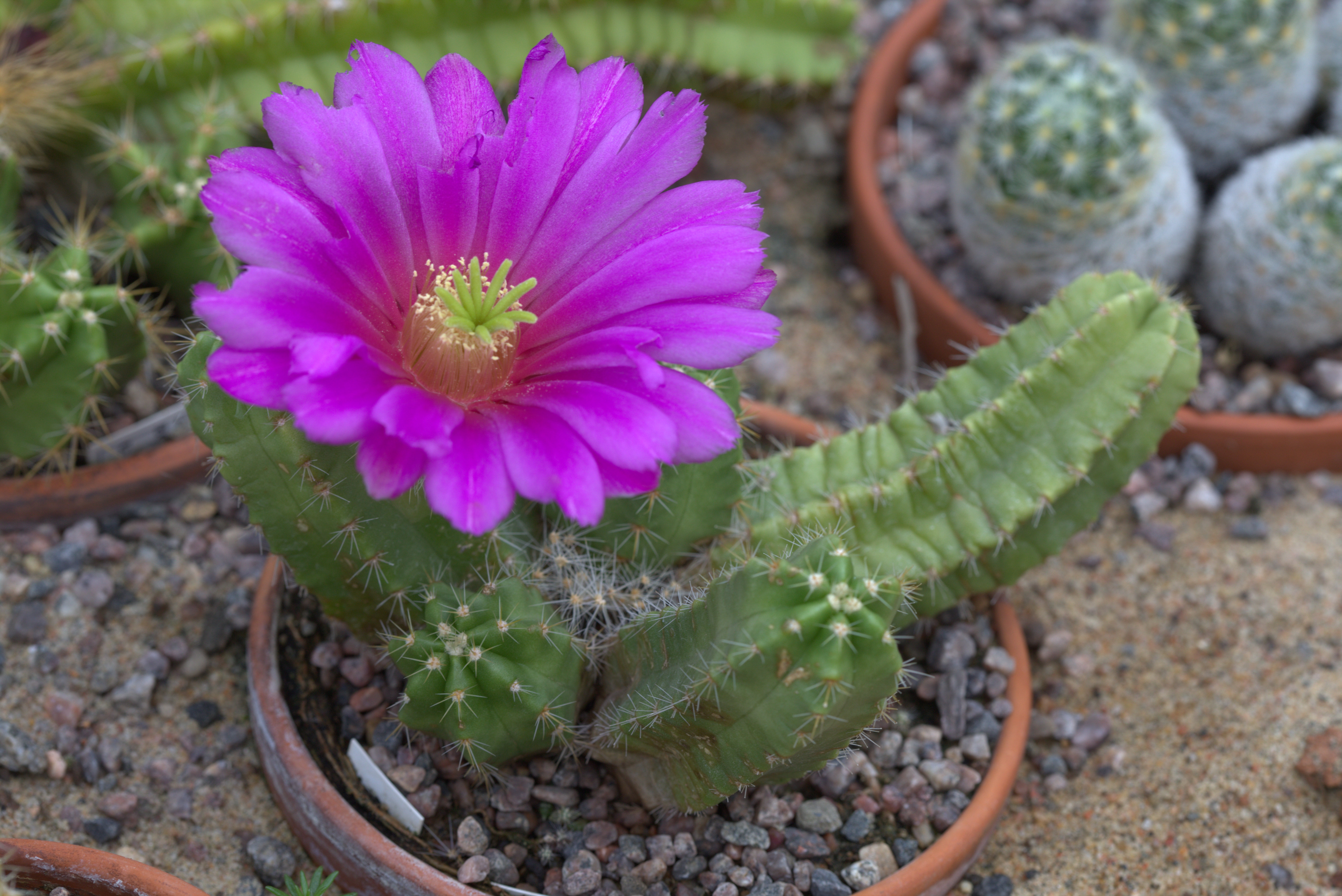

Conservation status
- Least Concern (IUCN 3.1)

Scientific classification
- Kingdom: Plantae
- Clade: Tracheophytes
- Clade: Angiosperms
- Clade: Eudicots
- Order: Caryophyllales
- Family: Cactaceae
- Subfamily: Cactoideae
- Genus: Echinocereus
- Species: E. viereckii

Binomial name
- Echinocereus viereckii Werderm., 1934

= Echinocereus viereckii =

Species of cactus

Echinocereus viereckii is a species of cactus native to Mexico.

== Description ==
Echinocereus viereckii grows upright or prostrate, branching at the base. Its dull, shiny light green shoots often reach up to 20 cm (7.9 in) in length and 4 to 4.5 cm (1.6 to 1.8 in) in diameter. The apex is loosely covered with white-yellowish areole felt, topped by an upright hyaline-yellow spine. It has 8 to 9 ribs, sharply separated at the apex and running straight down, about 6 to 8 mm (0.24 to 0.31 in) high. These ribs are deeply indented between the areoles, forming mammillary-like humps. The 7 to 9 radial spines spread horizontally, are evenly distributed, and usually 5 to 7 mm (0.20 to 0.28 in) long. The 4 central spines are thickened at the base and can grow up to 2 cm (0.79 in) long.

The funnel-shaped flowers are up to 11 cm (4.3 in) in diameter and are purplish-pink, with a glassy flower tube and light golden brown thorns.

=== Subspecies ===
Accepted subspecies:

Image	Scientific name	Distribution
	Echinocereus viereckii subsp. morricalii (Říha) N.P.Taylor	Mexico (W. Nuevo León)
	Echinocereus viereckii subsp. viereckii	Mexico (SW. Tamaulipas, Nuevo León, Coahuila)

== Distribution ==
Echinocereus viereckii is found in the Mexican states of Nuevo León and Tamaulipas.

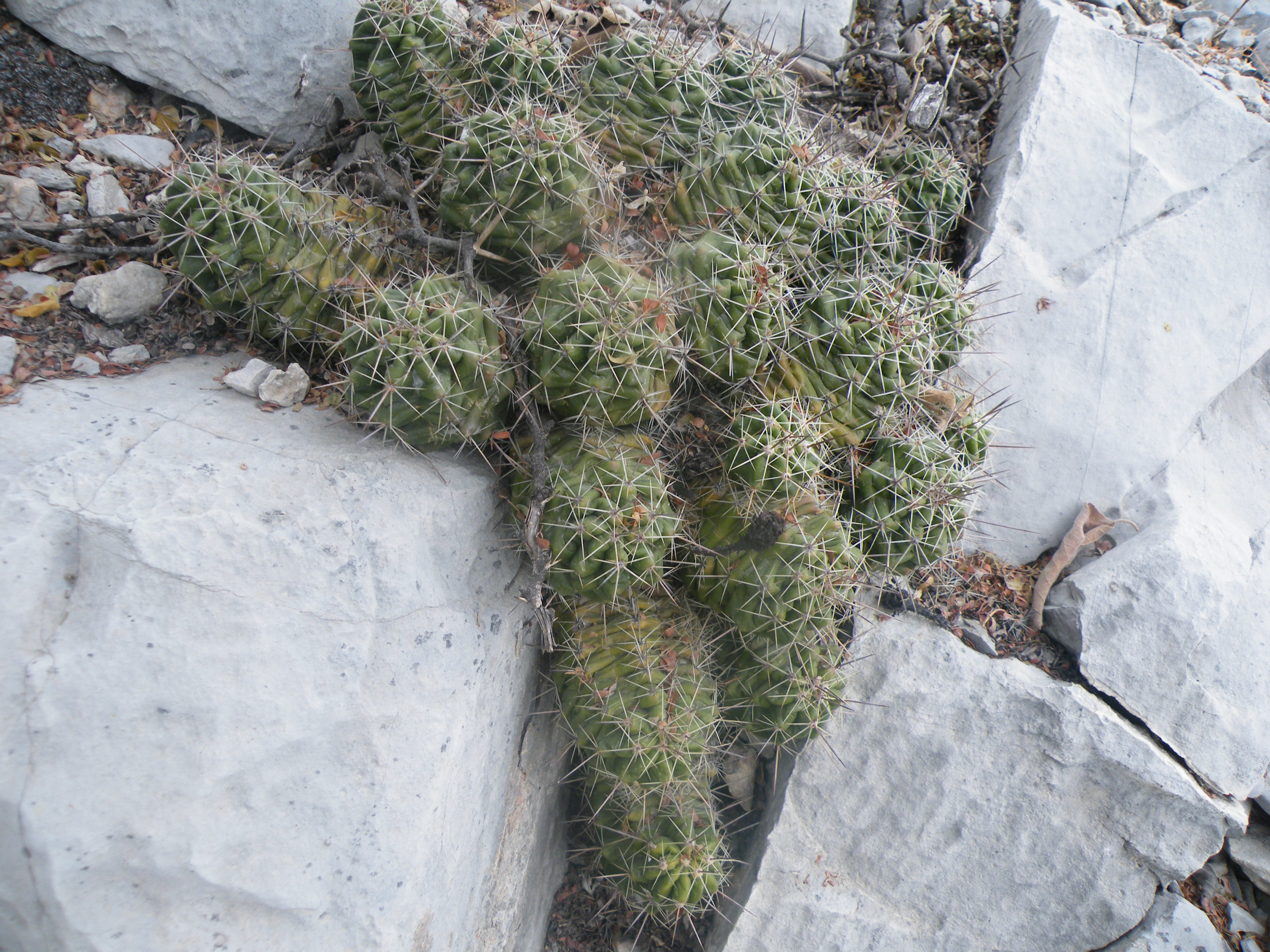
Plants growing in Nogales, Huasteca canyon, Nuevo Leon

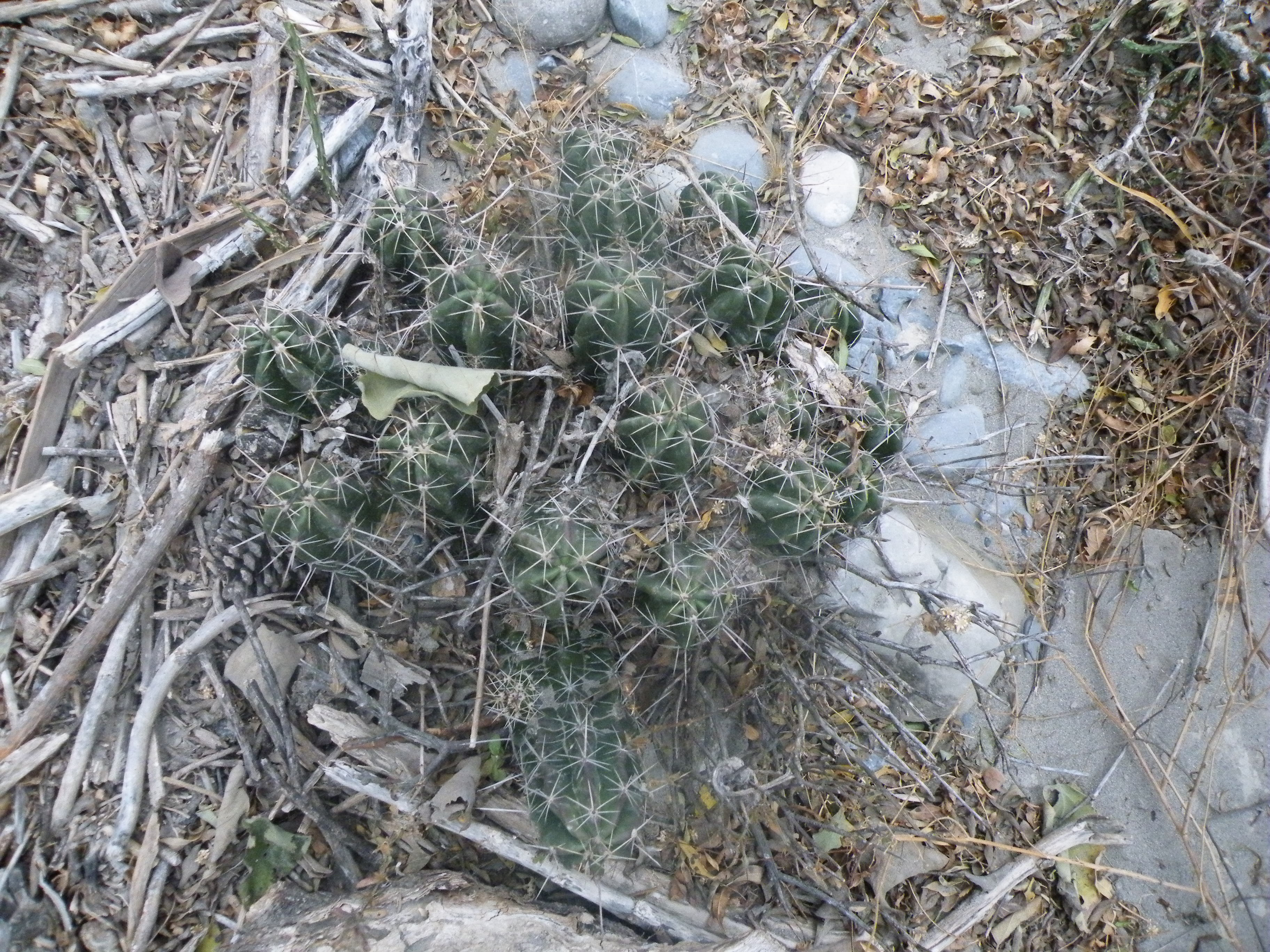
Plants growing Huasteca canyon, Nuevo Leon

== Taxonomy ==
Erich Werdermann first described the species in 1934, and the specific epithet viereckii honors German plant collector Hans-Wilhelm Viereck.
