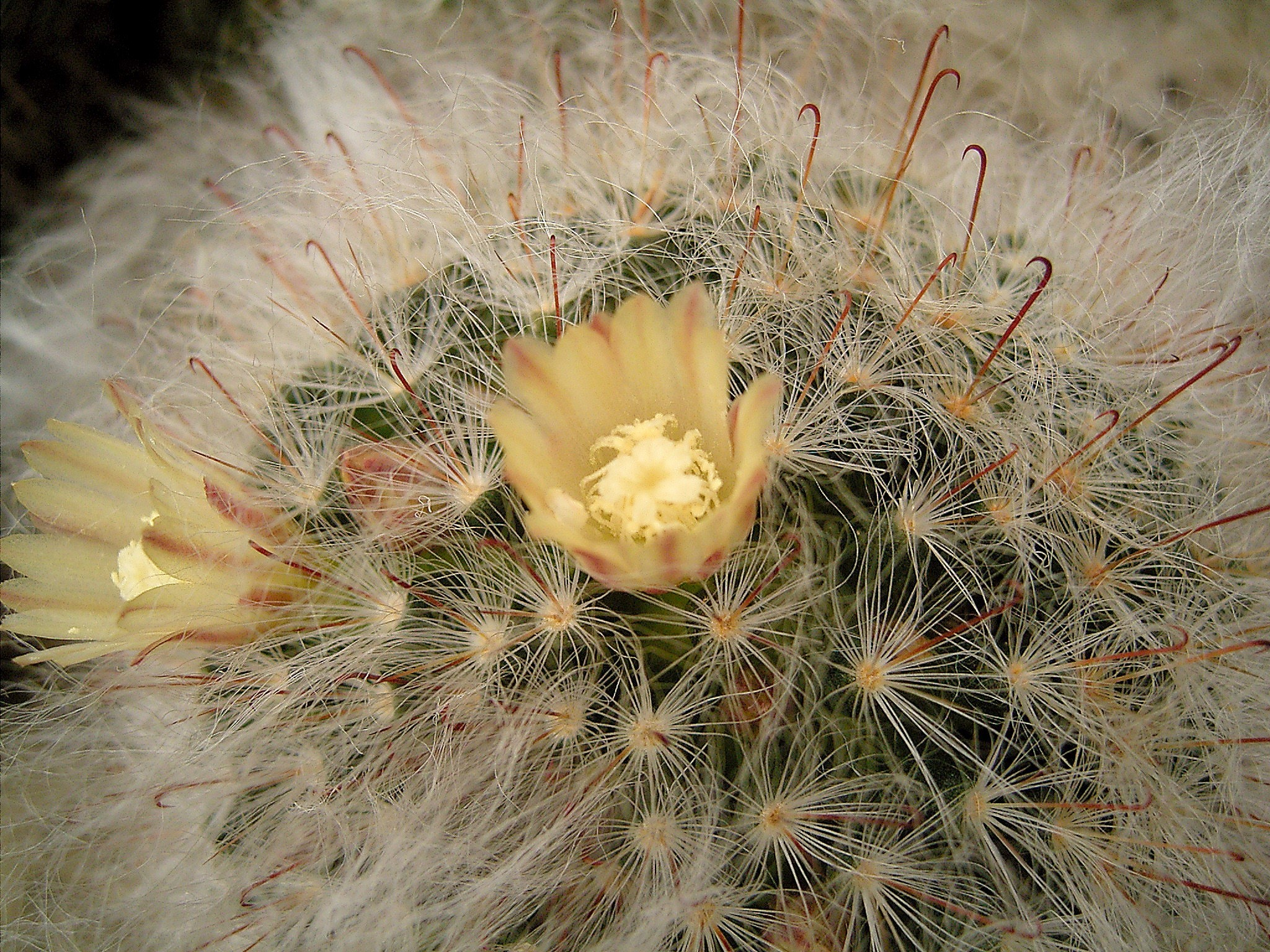

Conservation status
- Least Concern (IUCN 3.1)

Scientific classification
- Kingdom: Plantae
- Clade: Tracheophytes
- Clade: Angiosperms
- Clade: Eudicots
- Order: Caryophyllales
- Family: Cactaceae
- Subfamily: Cactoideae
- Genus: Mammillaria
- Species: M. bocasana

Binomial name
- Mammillaria bocasana Poselg., 1853

= Mammillaria bocasana =

Species of cactus

Mammillaria bocasana is a species of cactus in the subfamily Cactoideae. It is often sold as a "powder puff" cactus, and also as a "Powder Puff Pincushion." The plant is protected from collecting in the wild in Mexico.

== Habitat ==
In its natural habitat of Northern central Mexico, it is found between 1650–2300 meters above sea level. It grows on canyon walls, in volcanic rock and in semi-desert environs, often under bushes of native plants. It has been listed as "Least Concern" on the IUCN Red List of Threatened Species since 2009.

== Description ==
Mammillaria bocasana is hemispherical in shape. It has "white, hair-like spines" that cover up its radial and hooked central spines. During the spring and summer, it bears several cream-colored flowers. Later it bears a red cylindrical fruit that contains reddish-brown seeds which display partially lateral hilum. Its form can be variable, with many different varieties or subspecies.

== Cultivation ==
Mammillaria bocasana can be propagated from seed. As it grows, it offsets, creating large mounds. This cactus is prone to rot and can tolerate temperatures of -7 degrees Celsius (20 degrees Fahrenheit) for short amounts of time. It has gained the Royal Horticultural Society's Award of Garden Merit.
