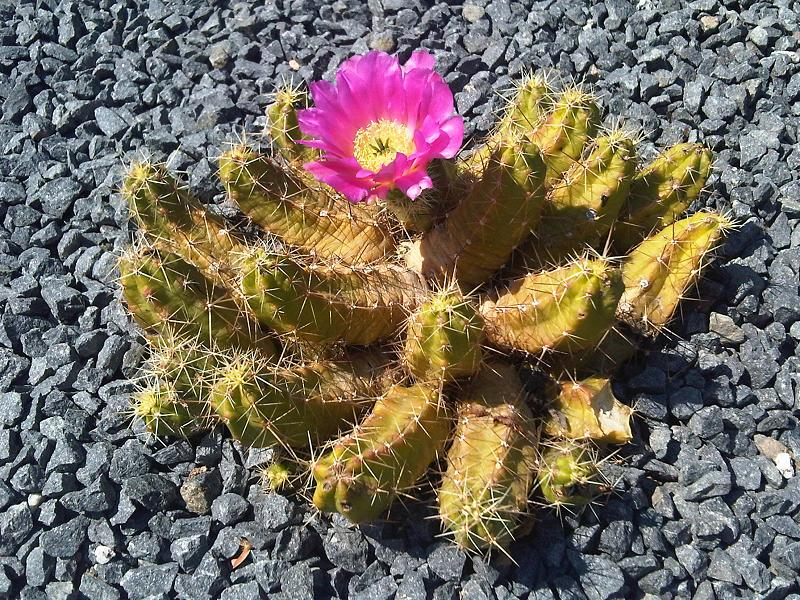
- Echinocereus pentalophus specimen in Kew Gardens, London.

Conservation status
- Least Concern (IUCN 3.1)

Scientific classification
- Kingdom: Plantae
- Clade: Tracheophytes
- Clade: Angiosperms
- Clade: Eudicots
- Order: Caryophyllales
- Family: Cactaceae
- Subfamily: Cactoideae
- Genus: Echinocereus
- Species: E. pentalophus

Binomial name
- Echinocereus pentalophus (DC.) Lem.

Synonyms
- Cereus pentalophus DC. 1828

= Echinocereus pentalophus =

Species of cactus

Echinocereus pentalophus, with the common name ladyfinger cactus, is a species of Echinocereus cactus, in the tribe Echinocereeae Tribe. It is native to North America.

== Description ==
Echinocereus pentalophus forms richly branched, low and splayed groups up to 1 meter in diameter. The yellowish green to gray-green, firm-fleshed, cylindrical shoots are 20 to 70 cm (7.9 to 27.6 in) long and have a diameter of 1 to 6 cm (0.39 to 2.36 in). There are three to eight mostly sharp-edged, straight ribs, which are later tuberous. The single protruding central spine, which can also be missing, is yellowish to dark brown and is up to 3 cm (1.2 in) long. The three to eight straight, whitish to yellowish marginal spines are up to 2 cm (0.79 in) long. The upper ones are very short.

The broadly funnel-shaped flowers are bright pink to slightly pink-magenta or rarely white and have a white or yellow throat. They never appear near the tips of the shoots, are 8 to 10 cm (3.1 to 3.9 in) long and reach a diameter of 10 to 15 cm (3.9 to 5.9 in). The egg-shaped green fruits have brown thorns and loose wool. They tear irregularly.

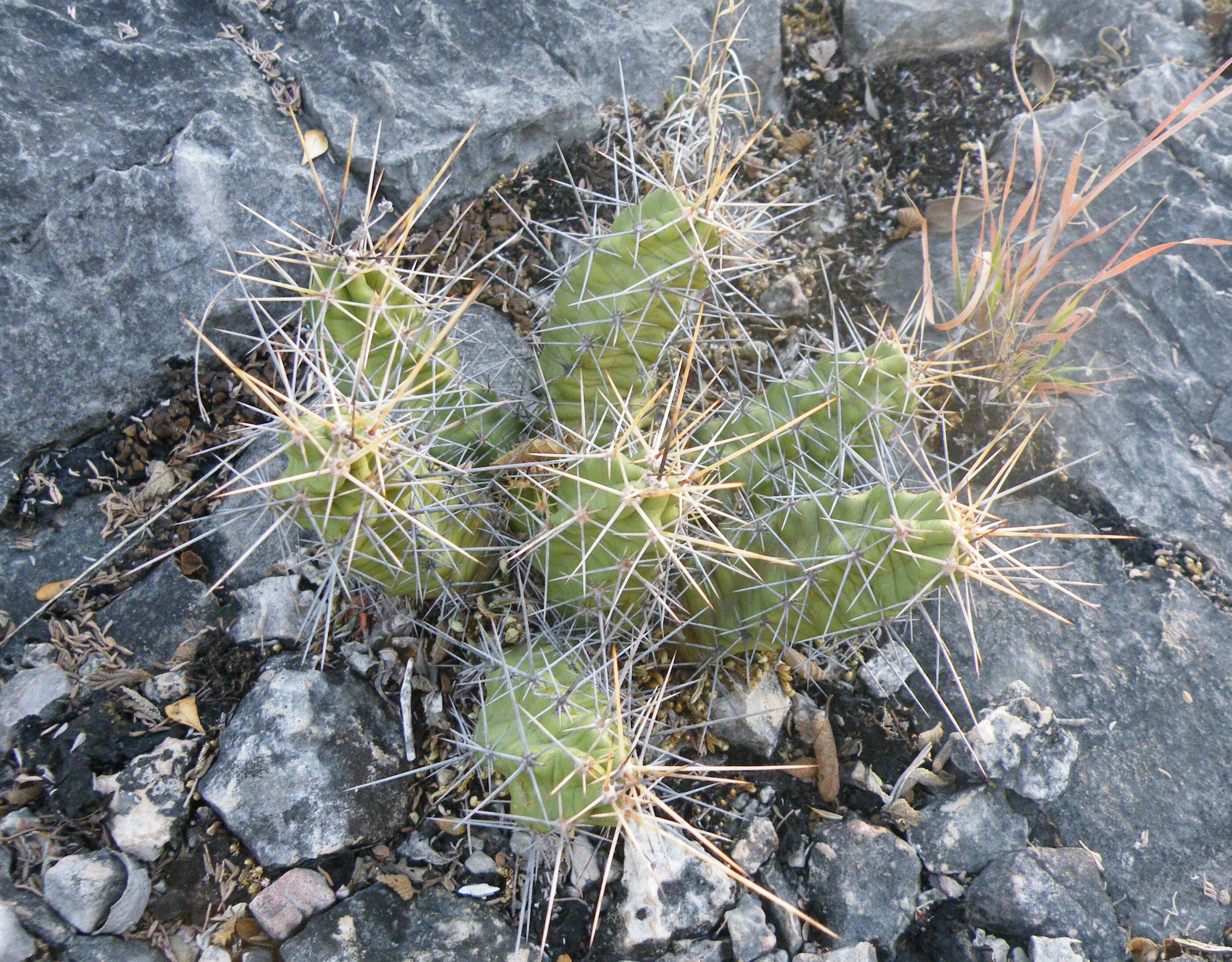
Echinocereus pentalophus in native habitat, San Luis Potosí, Northeastern Mexico.

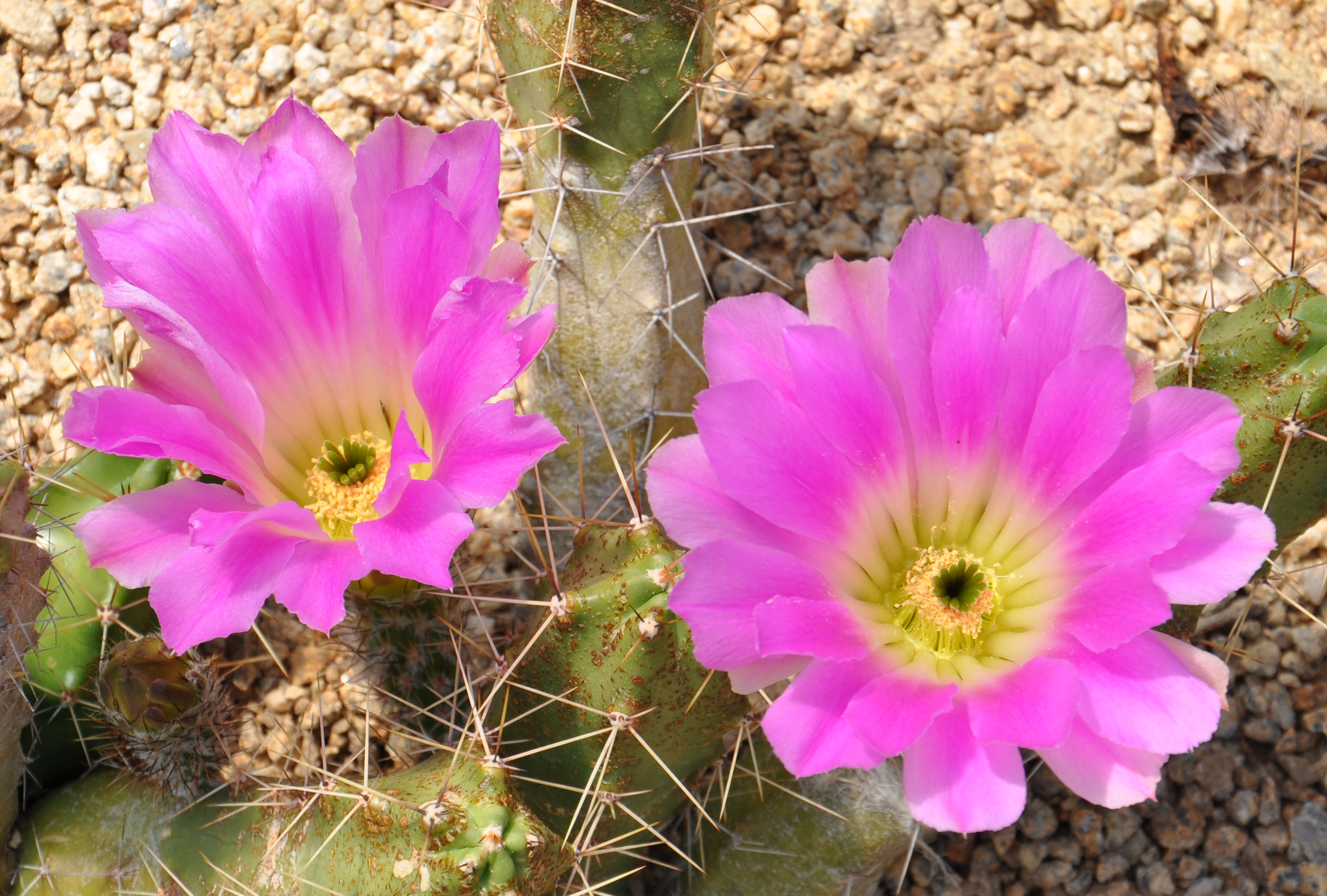
Close up of flowers.

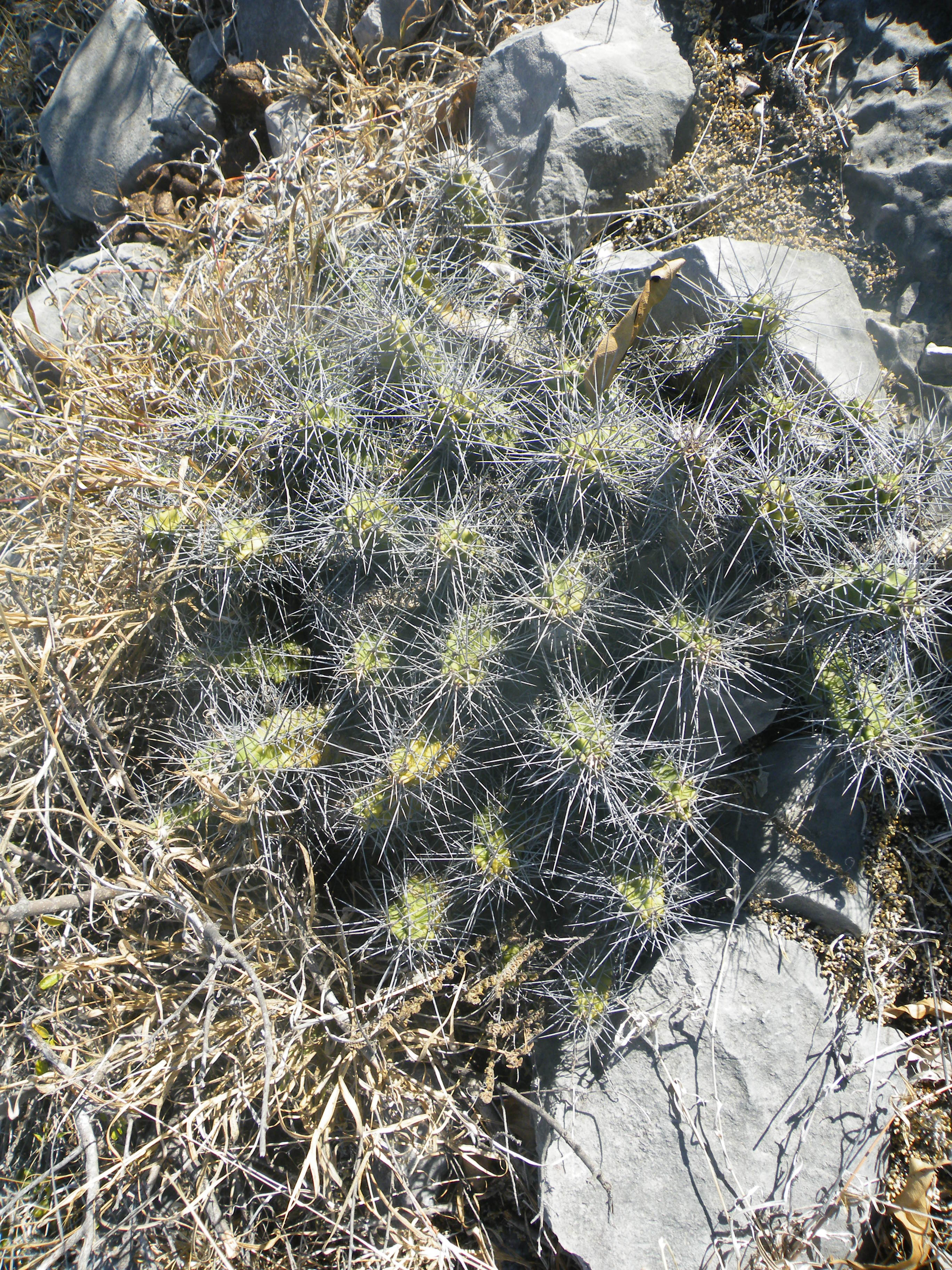
Echinocereus pentalophus in native habitat, Cerritos, San Luis Potosi

=== Subspecies ===
Accepted subspecies:

Image	Name	Distribution
	Echinocereus pentalophus subsp. leonensis (Mathsson) N.P.Taylor	Mexico (SE. Coahila to W. & S. Nuevo León)
	Echinocereus pentalophus subsp. pentalophus	E. Mexico (to Jalisco)
	Echinocereus pentalophus subsp. procumbens (Engelm.) W.Blum & Mich.Lange	S. Texas to Mexico (Tamaulipas).

== Distribution ==
The cactus species is found from San Luis Potosí state, through Northeastern Mexico, and into the southern Rio Grande Valley in southeastern Texas and in the Mexican states of Coahuila, Tamaulipas, Nuevo León, Guanajuato, San Luis Potosí, Hidalgo and Querétaro..

== Taxonomy ==
The first description as Cereus pentalophus by Augustin-Pyrame de Candolle was published in 1828. The specific epithet pentalophus is derived from the Greek words penta for five and lophos for comb and refers to the mostly five-ribbed shoots of the species. Charles Lemaire placed the species in the genus Echinocereus in 1868

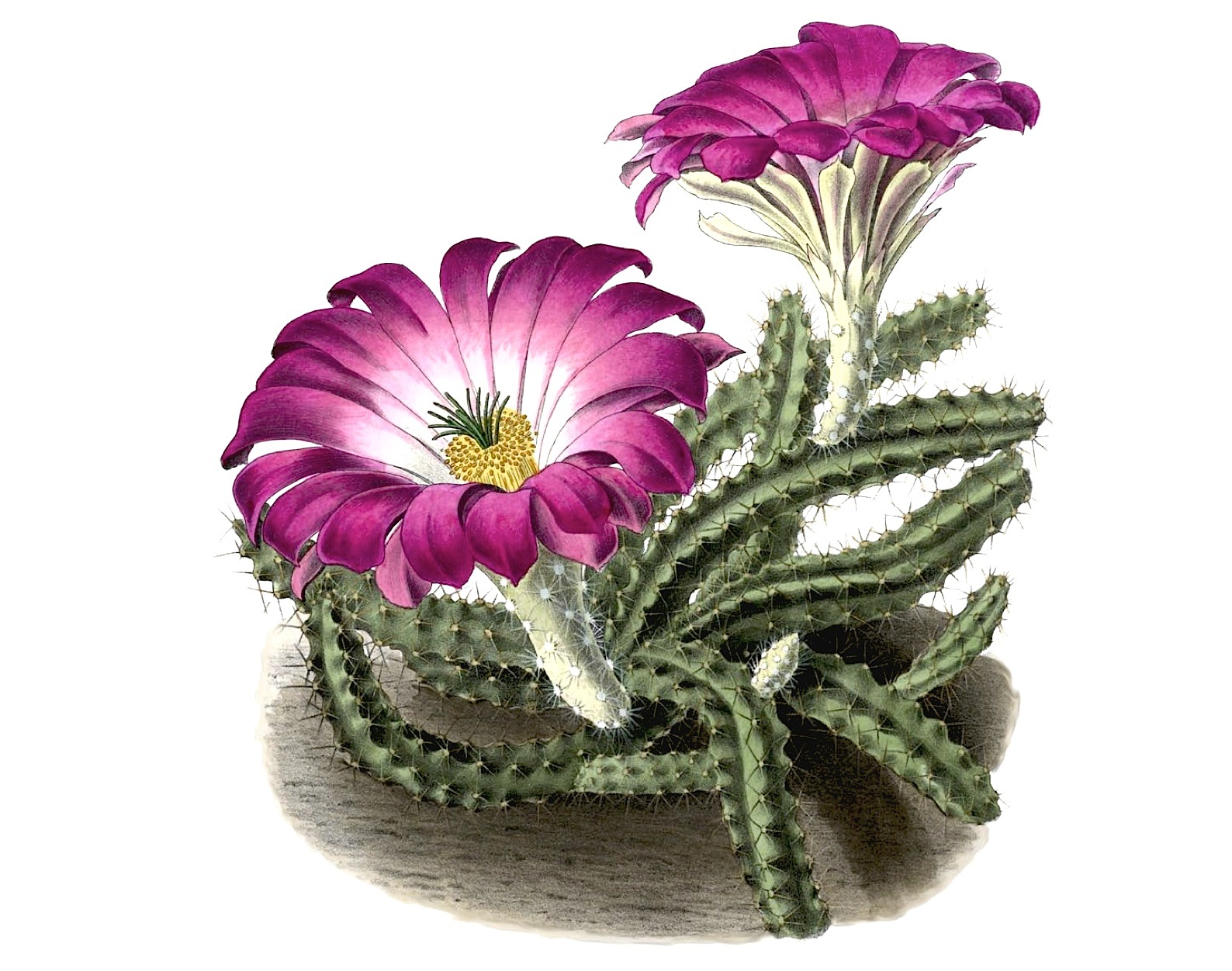
