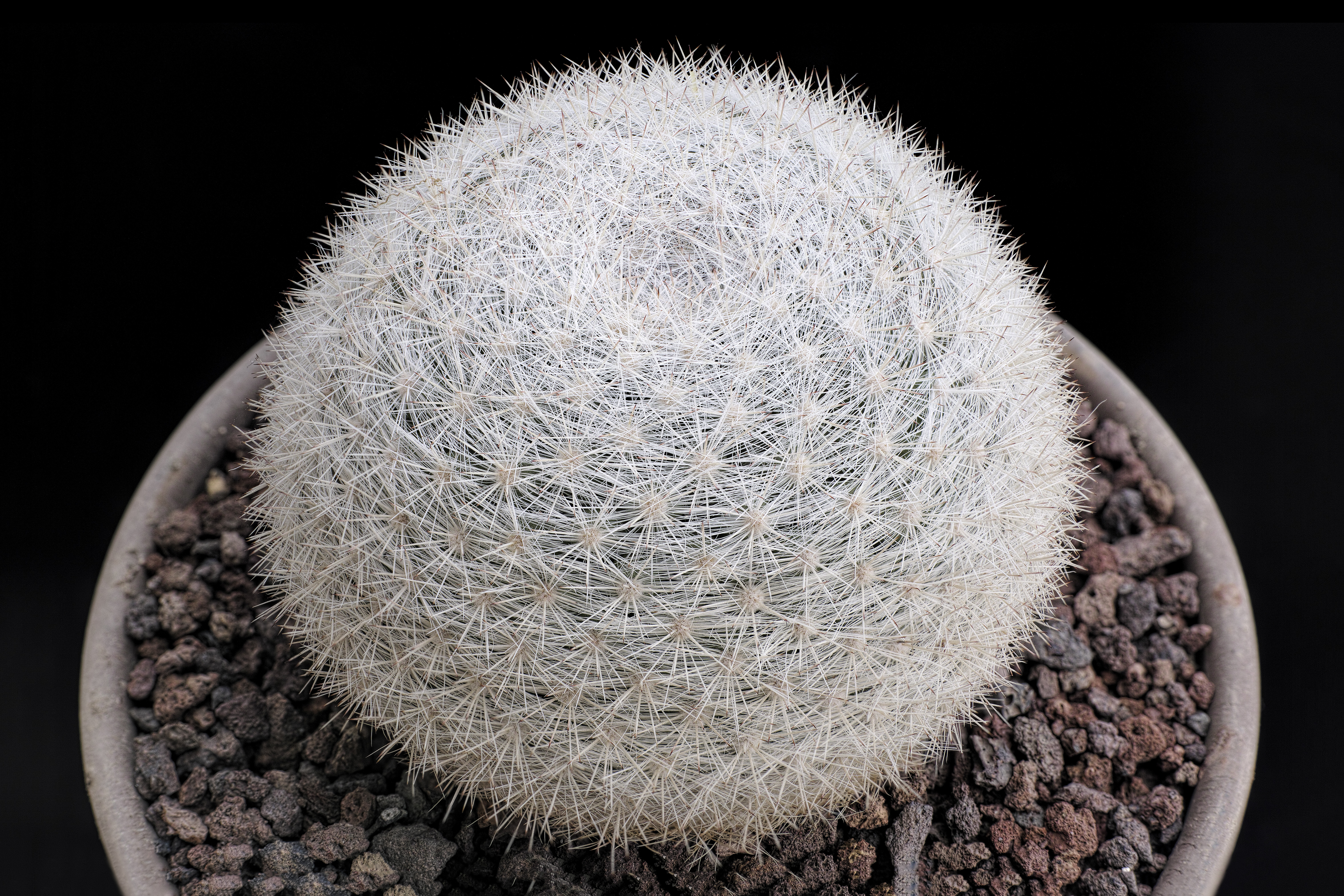

Scientific classification
- Kingdom: Plantae
- Clade: Tracheophytes
- Clade: Angiosperms
- Clade: Eudicots
- Order: Caryophyllales
- Family: Cactaceae
- Subfamily: Cactoideae
- Genus: Mammillaria
- Species: M. candida

Binomial name
- Mammillaria candida Scheidw.

Synonyms
- List: Cactus sphaerotrichus Kuntze; Chilita candida (Scheidw.) Orcutt; Chilita estanzuelensis (A.Berger) Buxb.; Mammillaria candida subsp. menchacaensis Rogoz. & Plein; Mammillaria candida subsp. ortizrubioana (Bravo) Rogoz. & Plein; Mammillaria candida var. estanzuelensis Repp.; Mammillaria candida var. rosea Salm-Dyck ex K.Schum.; Mammillaria candida var. sphaerotricha Schelle; Mammillaria estanzuelensis A.Berger; Mammillaria ortizrubioana (Bravo) Werderm.; Mammillaria sphaerotricha var. rosea Salm-Dyck; Mammillaria sphaerotricha Lem.; Mammilloydia candida subsp. ortizrubioana (Bravo) Krainz; Mammilloydia candida var. rosea (Salm-Dyck) Krainz; Mammilloydia candida (Scheidw.) Buxb.; Mammilloydia ortizrubioana (Bravo) Buxb.; Neomammillaria candida var. rosea (Salm-Dyck) Y.Itô, without basionym ref.; Neomammillaria candida (Scheidw.) Britton & Rose; Neomammillaria ortizrubioana Bravo

= Mammillaria candida =

Snowball cactus

Genus of plants

Mammillaria candida, the snowball cactus, is a species of cactus endemic to Mexico. When treated as Mammilloydia candida, it was the only species in the genus Mammilloydia.

== Description ==
Mammillaria candida is green, globe-shaped, but with age it becomes almost cylindrical. It can reach a diameter of about 15 centimetres (5.9 in) and a height of about 30 centimetres (12 in). As is usual in the genus Mammillaria, this plant has no ribs. The flowers are pink or white. The plant is covered by fine white hair. The spines are short, very numerous, usually snow white or brown.

== Distribution ==
This species originates from Mexico (Coahuila, Nuevo León, San Luis Potosí and Tamaulipas).

== Habitat ==
The natural habitat of Mammillaria candida is the desert. It grows in the thickets of xerophytic shrubs on calcareous soils, at an altitude of 500–2,500 metres (1,600–8,200 ft) above sea level.
