= Friedrich Bödeker =

German botanist (1867–1937)

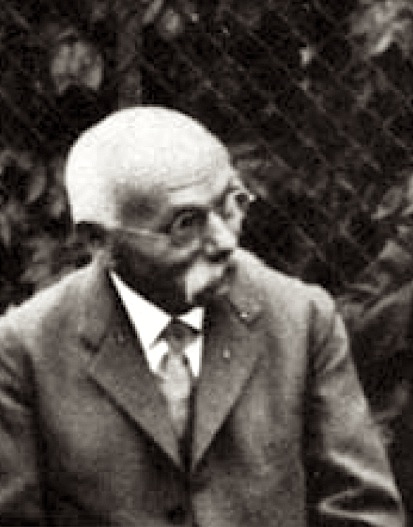
Friedrich Bödeker

Friedrich Bödeker (11 September 1867 in Währentrup – 9 April 1937 in Cologne) was a German botanist who specialized in cacti studies.

He was the taxonomic author of the cacti genera Aztekium and Porfiria as well as of numerous species within the family Cactaceae. Many of his descriptions were published in the journals "Monatsschrift der Deutschen Kakteen-Gesellschaft" and the "Zeitschrift für Sukkulentenkunde".

== Published works ==
- Ein Mammillarien-Vergleichs-Schlüssel. J. Neumann, 1933.
