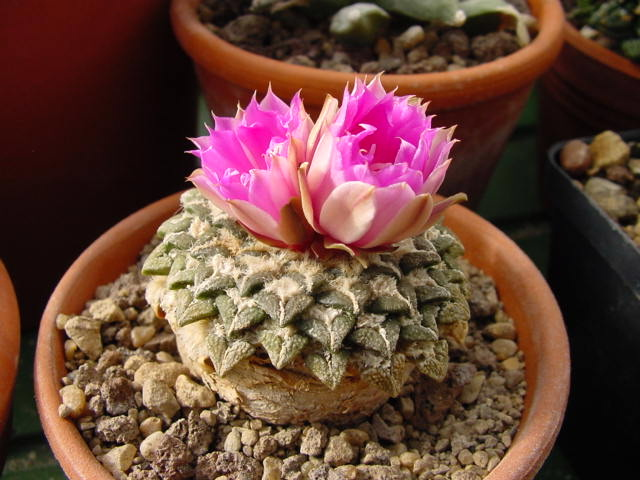

Conservation status
- Near Threatened (IUCN 3.1)
- CITES Appendix I

Scientific classification
- Kingdom: Plantae
- Clade: Embryophytes
- Clade: Tracheophytes
- Clade: Spermatophytes
- Clade: Angiosperms
- Clade: Eudicots
- Order: Caryophyllales
- Family: Cactaceae
- Subfamily: Cactoideae
- Genus: Ariocarpus
- Species: A. kotschoubeyanus

Binomial name
- Ariocarpus kotschoubeyanus (Lem.) K.Schum.

Synonyms
- List: Anhalonium kotschoubeyanum Lem. 1844; Roseocactus kotschoubeyanus (Lem.) A.Berger 1925; Anhalonium fissipedum Monv. ex C.F.Forst. 1885; Anhalonium kotchubeyi Lem. ex Salm-Dyck 1850; Anhalonium sulcatum Salm-Dyck 1850; Ariocarpus kotschoubeyanus subsp. albiflorus (Backeb.) Glass 1998 publ. 1997; Ariocarpus kotschoubeyanus subsp. elephantidens Halda 1998; Ariocarpus kotschoubeyanus var. elephantidens Skarupke 1973; Ariocarpus kotschoubeyanus subsp. neotulensis Halda 2002; Ariocarpus kotschoubeyanus subsp. skarupkeanus Halda & Horáček 2002; Ariocarpus kotschoubeyanus subsp. sladkovskyi Halda & Horáček 1998; Ariocarpus kotschoubeyanus subsp. tulensis Halda 1998; Ariocarpus rotchubeyanus Cobbold 1903; Ariocarpus sulcatus (Salm-Dyck) K.Schum. 1894; Mammillaria sulcata Salm-Dyck 1850; Roseocactus kotschoubeyanus var. albiflorus Backeb. 1951; Roseocactus kotschoubeyanus subsp. macdowellii Backeb. 1949; Roseocactus kotschoubeyanus var. macdowellii (Backeb.) Backeb. 1961; Stromatocactus kotschoubeyi Karw. ex C.F.Först. & Rümpler 1885; Strombocactus kotschoubeyi Karw. ex C.F.Först. & Rümpler 1885

= Ariocarpus kotschoubeyanus =

Species of cactus

Ariocarpus kotschoubeyanus is a species of plant in the family Cactaceae.

== Description ==
The Ariocarpus koschoubeyanus usually grows alone and remains below the soil surface. Its dark olive-green shoots, which are flattened at the tip and slightly sunken in the middle, have a diameter of 3 to 7 cm (1.2 to 2.8 in). The warts are spirally arranged, elongated at the base, becoming broadly triangular and tapering towards the tip. They measure 5 to 13 mm (0.20 to 0.51 in) long and 3 to 10 mm (0.12 to 0.39 in) wide. A woolly furrow extends across the middle of the areoles, and there are no thorns.

The flowers are typically crimson red and 1.5 to 2.5 cm (0.59 to 0.98 in) in diameter, though there is at least one population with white flowers. The sepals are green or brownish, somewhat fleshy, and often split into two columns. The petals are lanceolate-spatulate, pointed, blunt, or edged. The stamens, style, and stigma are white. The elongated fruits are 8 to 18 mm (0.31 to 0.71 in) long.

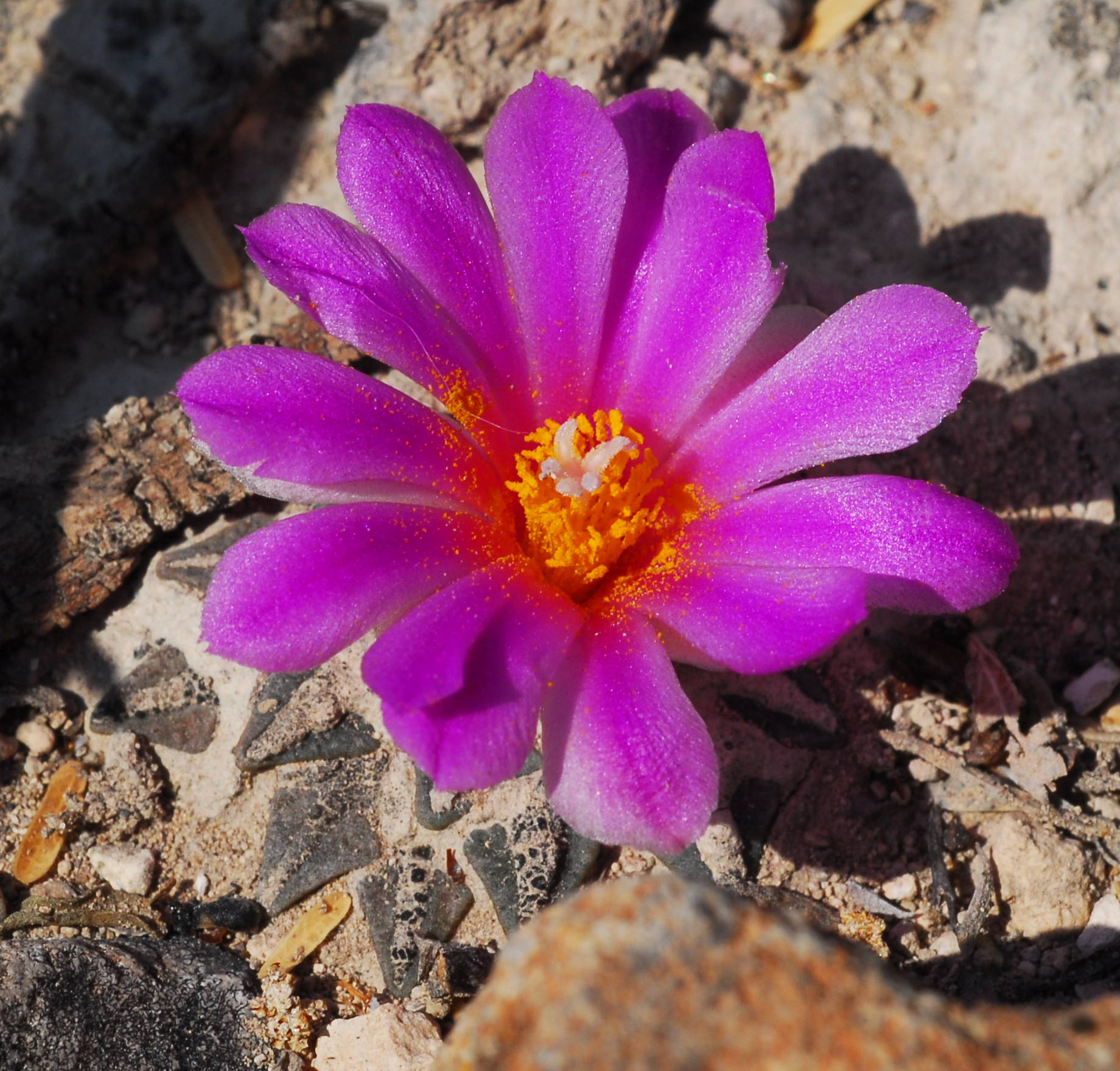
Close up on flower

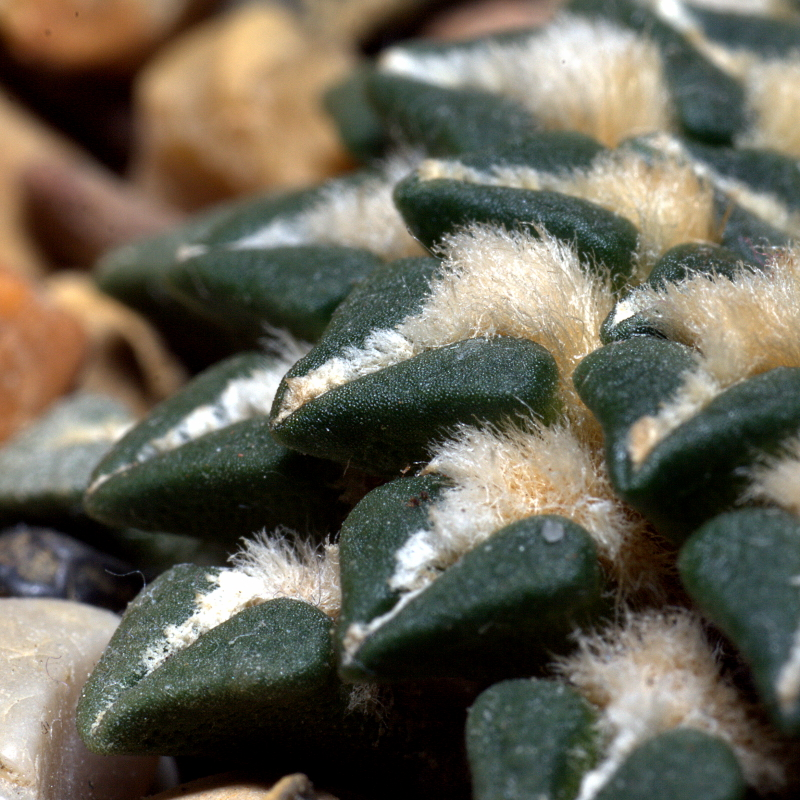
Leaves

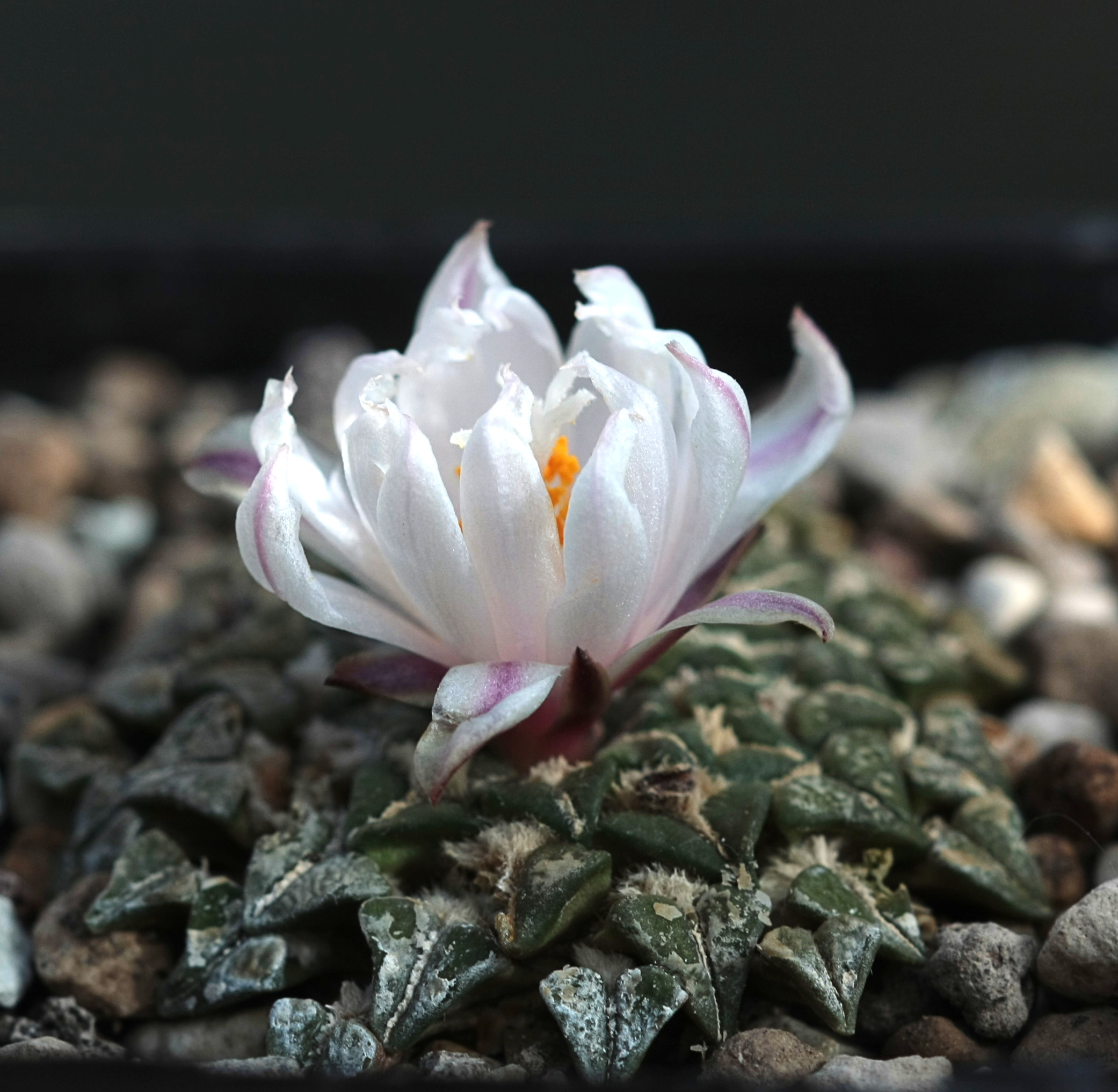
White flower form

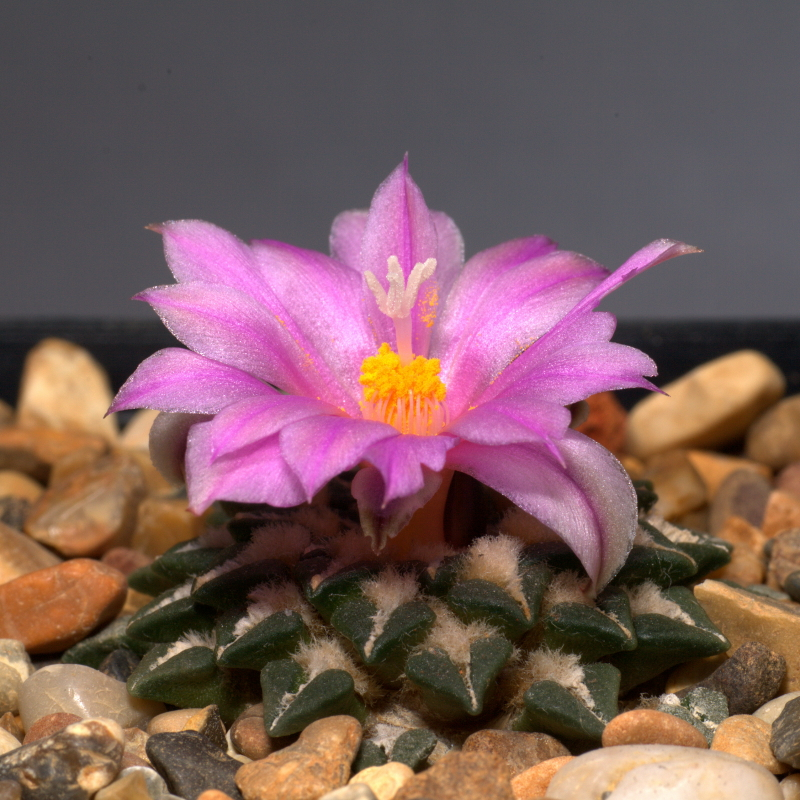
Pink flower form

== Distribution ==
The distribution of Ariocarpus koschoubeyanus ranges from the Mexican state of Coahuila south to Querétaro, including parts of Zacatecas, San Luis Potosí, Nuevo León, and Tamaulipas, where it grows in the Chihuahuan Desert in loamy plains growing at elevations of 1000 to 1900 meters. It is threatened by habitat loss. Plants are found growing along Dasylirion longissimum, Thelocactus bicolor, Mammillaria elongata, Agave stricta, Lophophora williamsii, Ferocactus uncinatus , and Echinocereus schmollii.

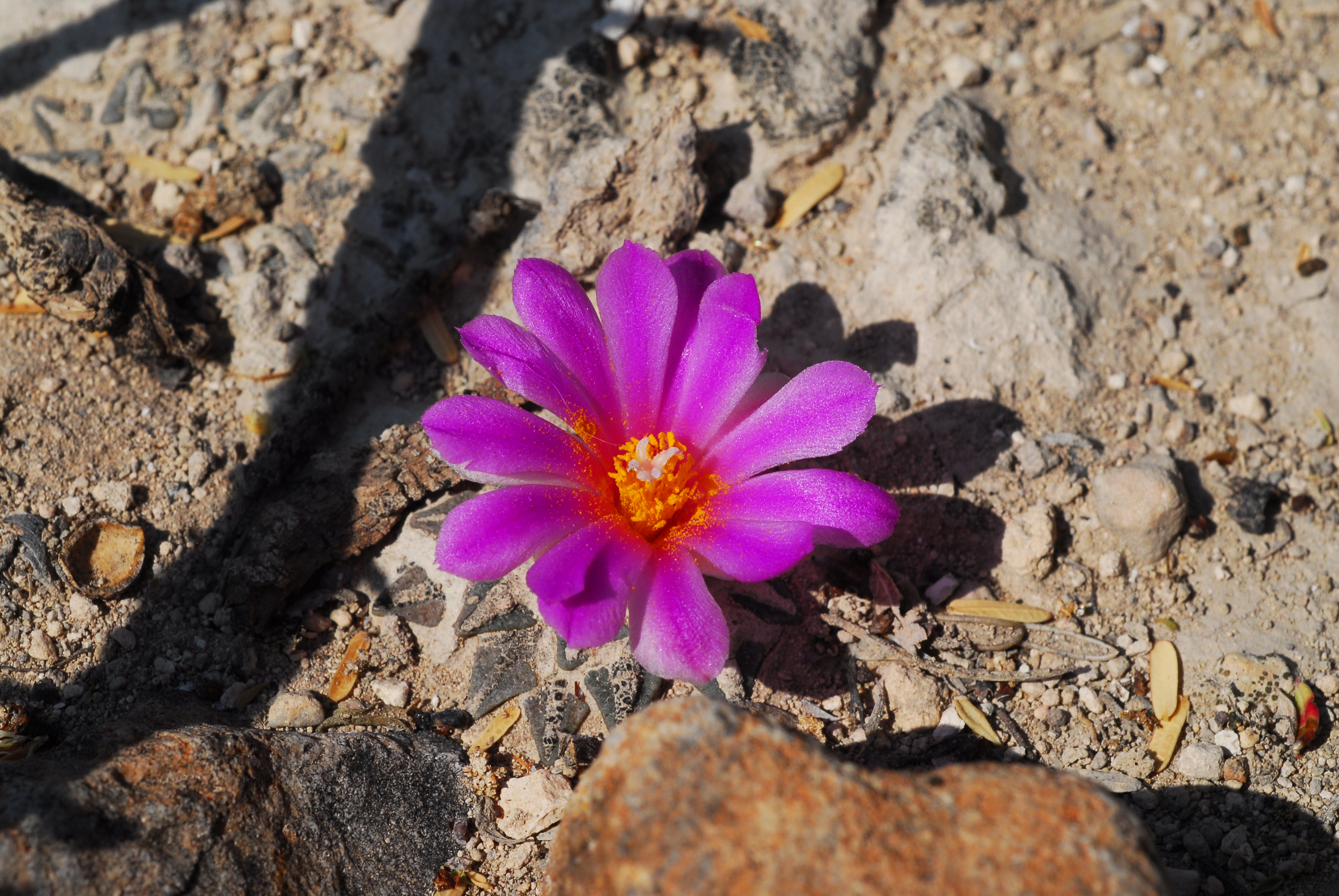
Plant growing in Nuevo Leon, Mexico

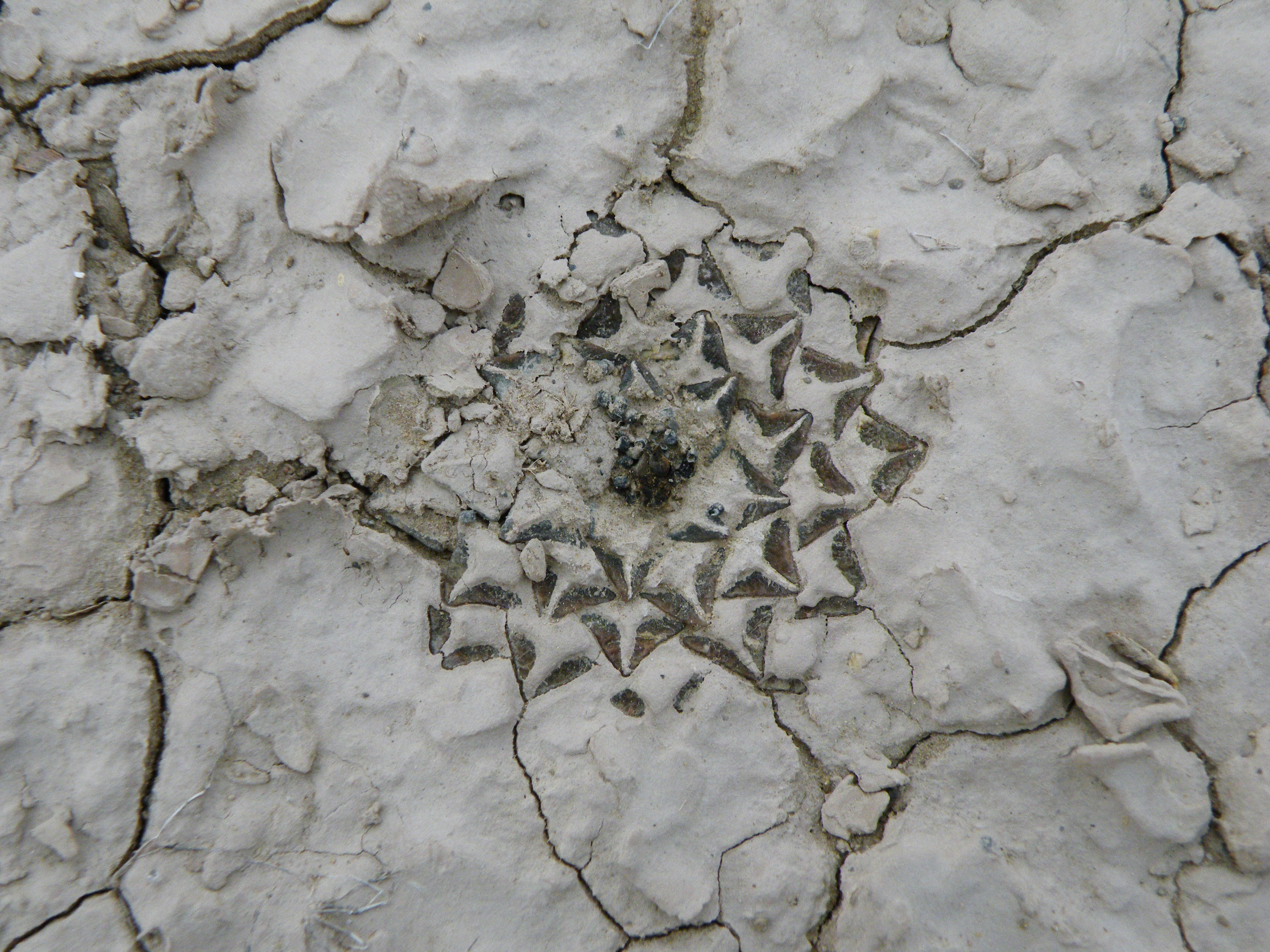
Plant growing in Estacion Marte, Coahuila

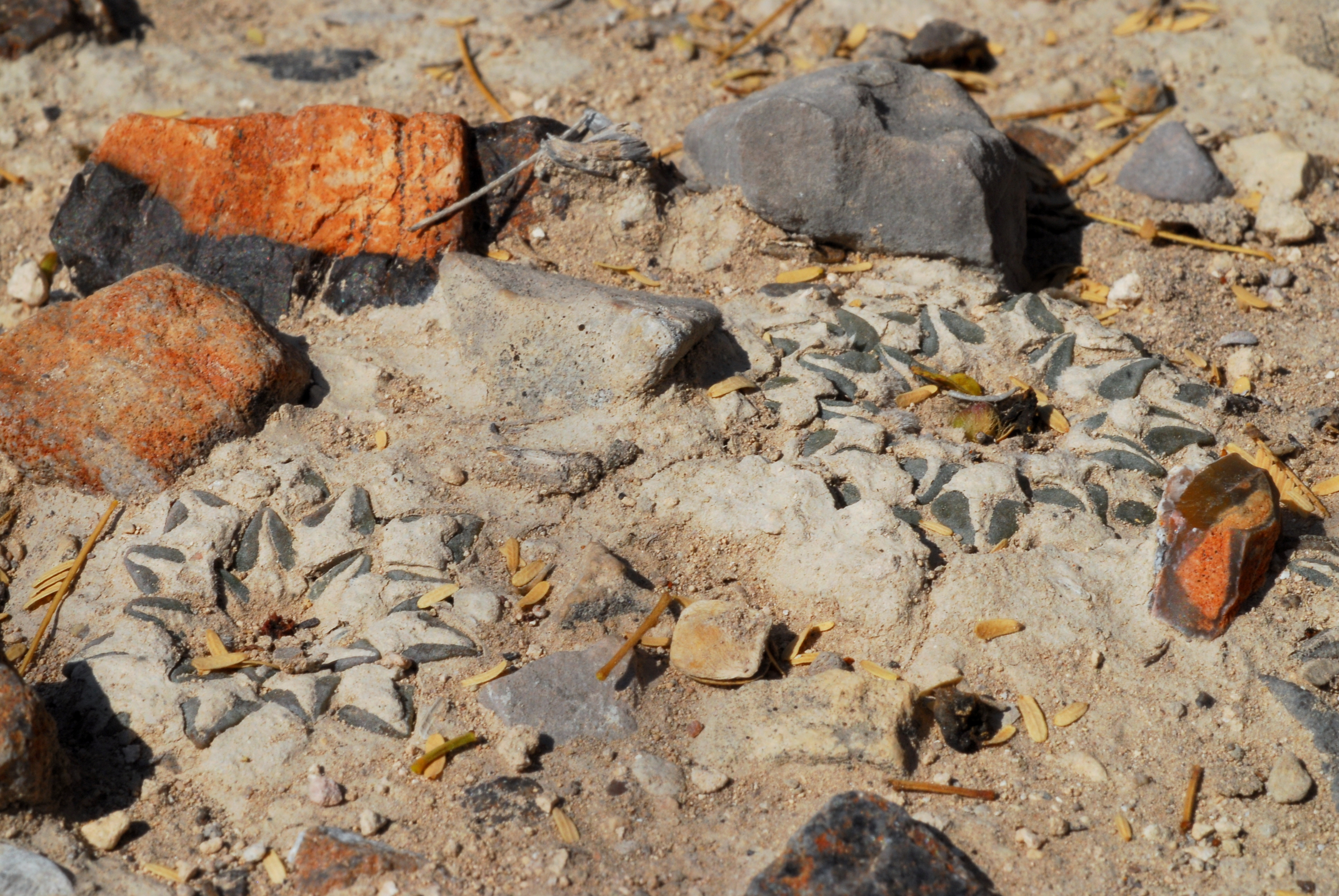
Plant growing near Dr. Arroyo, Nuevo Leon, Mexico

== Taxonomy ==
The species was first collected around 1840 by Wilhelm Friedrich von Karwinsky and sent to Europe. Charles Lemaire described it in 1842 as Anhalonium kotschoubeyanum. The specific epithet honors Prince Wassili Viktorovich Kochubey. Karl Moritz Schumann reassigned the species to the genus Ariocarpus in 1898.

== Pharmacology ==
Hordenine and N-methyltyramine were found in Ariocarpus kotschoubeyanus.
