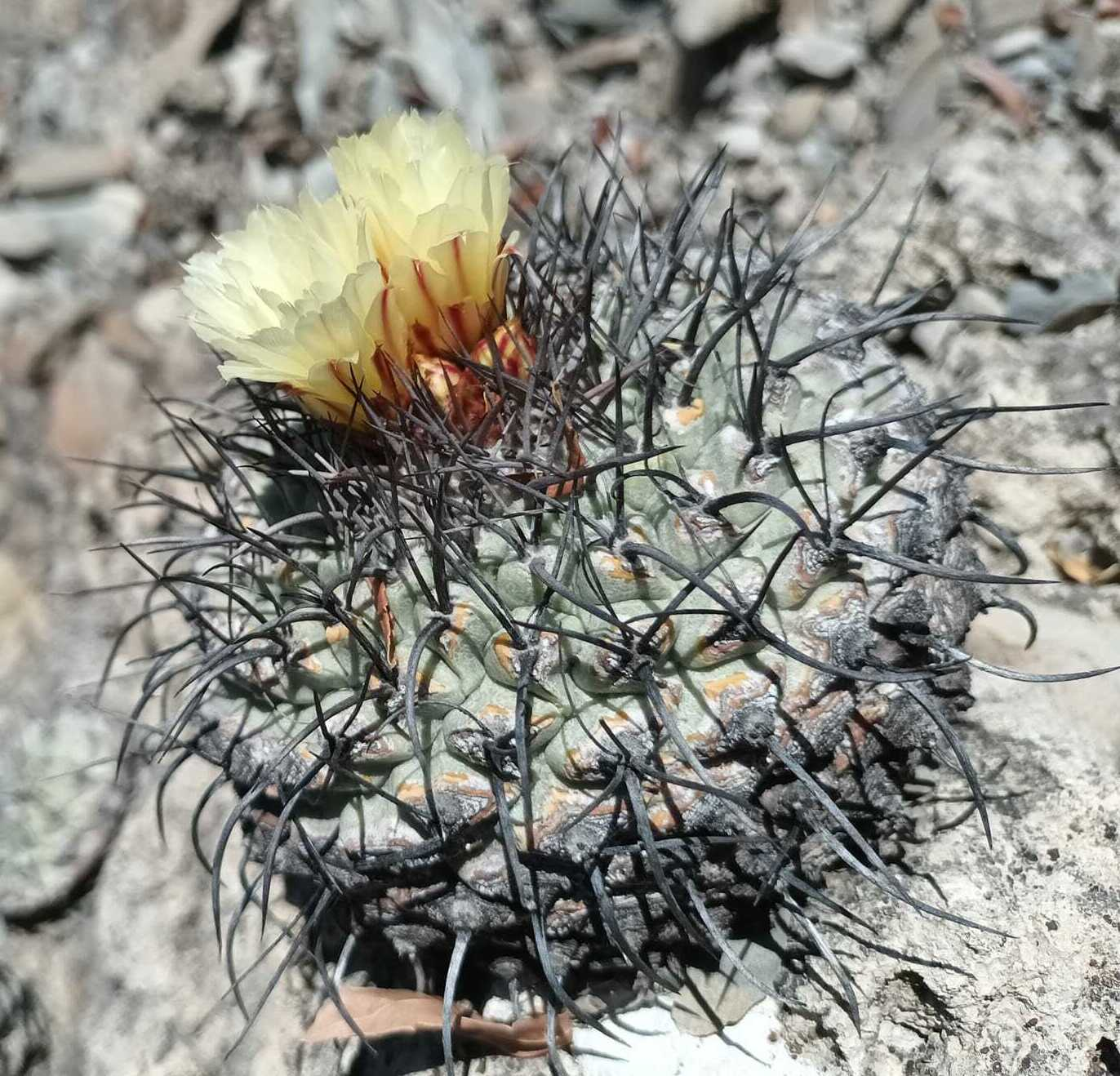
- Sclerocactus brevihamatus subsp. tobuschii

Scientific classification
- Kingdom: Plantae
- Clade: Tracheophytes
- Clade: Angiosperms
- Clade: Eudicots
- Order: Caryophyllales
- Family: Cactaceae
- Subfamily: Cactoideae
- Genus: Strombocactus
- Species: S. corregidorae

Binomial name
- Strombocactus corregidorae S.Arias & E.Sánchez

Synonyms
- Chichimecactus corregidorae (S.Arias & E.Sánchez) Bárcenas, H.M.Hern. & P.Hern.-Led.

= Strombocactus corregidorae =

Genus of flowering plants

Strombocactus corregidorae is a species of cactus.

== Description ==
Strombocactus corregidorae is a cactus species characterized by a single, occasionally branched stem. Young plants are globose, maturing into an elongated cylindrical shape. They typically reach 18–23 cm in height and 8–12 cm in diameter, with a grayish-green to glaucous green coloration. The plant possesses a simple, slightly thickened fibrous root system. The stem features 8–13 spirally arranged ribs, subdivided into tubercles measuring 0.7–1.3 cm long and 0.9–2 cm wide at the base. Areoles, 4.2–4.9 mm long and 2.9–3.1 mm wide, are located on these tubercles. Trichomes are present only on young areoles near the apical meristem. Spines, 2–3.5 cm long, cover at least two-thirds of the plant. Upper areole spines are shorter, thinner, and flexible, while middle spines are longer, thicker, and rigid. Spines are gray when young, maturing to grayish-black. Flowers are yellow, measuring 3.5–4 cm in both length and diameter. Fruits are ellipsoidal, smooth, and 0.9–1.1 cm long by 0.6–0.7 cm in diameter, transitioning from yellowish-green (sometimes with purplish hues) when ripe to pale yellow when dry. Seeds are obovoid, 0.5–0.6 cm long, and reddish-brown.

== Distribution ==
It is native to the states of Querétaro and Hidalgo in northeastern Mexico, where it grows in desert and dry shrubland at elevations around 1500 meters. Plants are found growing along Aporocactus flagelliformis, Ariocarpus kotschoubeyanus, Astrophytum ornatum, Kroenleinia grusonii, Echinocereus schmollii, Ferocactus glaucescens, Isolatocereus dumortieri, Lophophora diffusa, Mammillaria herrerae, Mammillaria scheinvariana, Mammillaria schiedeana, Marginatocereus marginatus, Cephalocereus polylophus and Neolloydia conoidea.

== Taxonomy ==
Strombocactus corregidorae was first published in the Mexican Journal of Biodiversity 81: 620 in 2010 by Ángel Salvador Arias Montes and Emiliano Sánchez M. The specific epithet honors Josefa Ortiz de Domínguez, the "Corregidora of Querétaro." It was previously the species in genus Chichimecactus.
