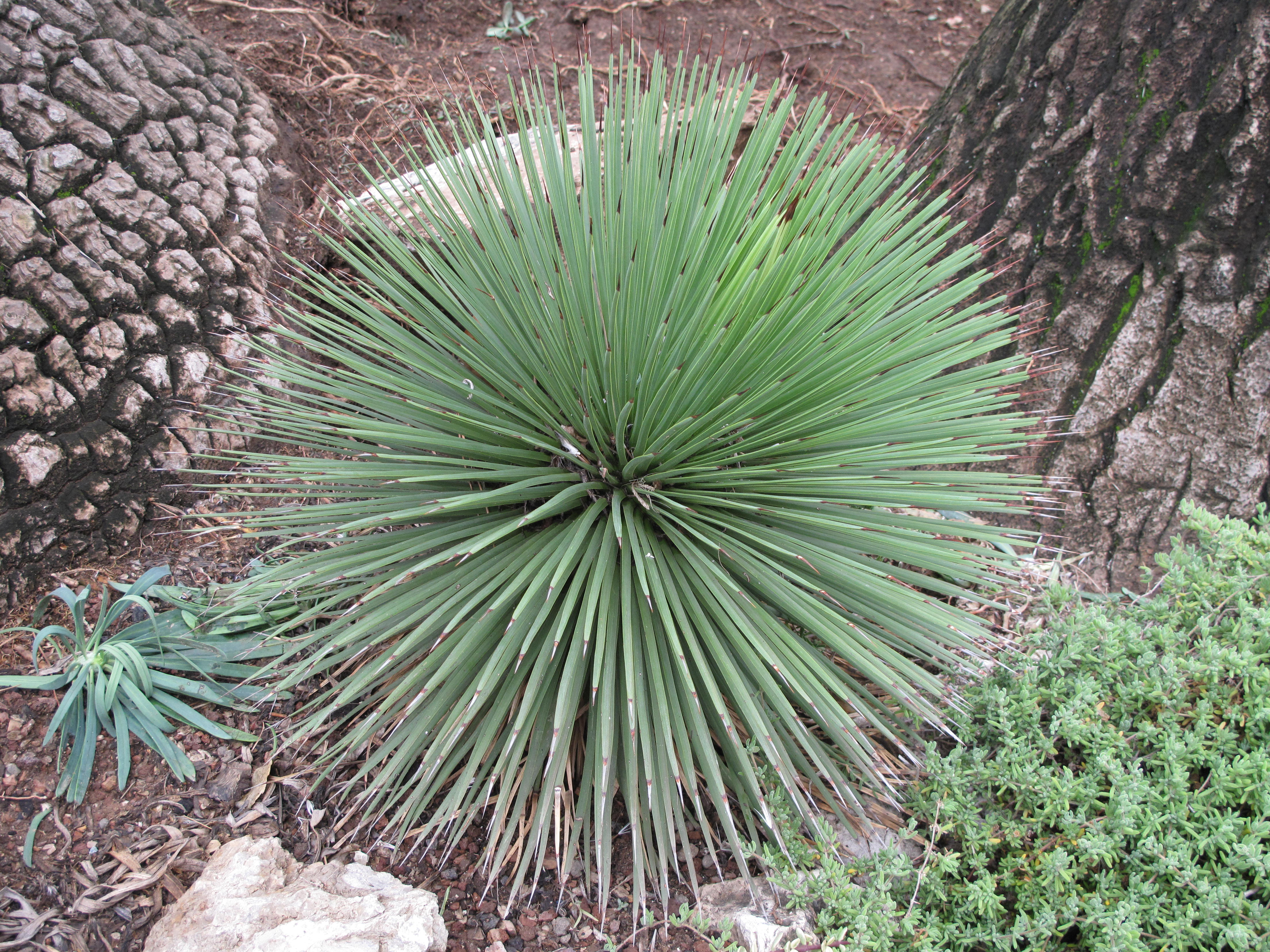

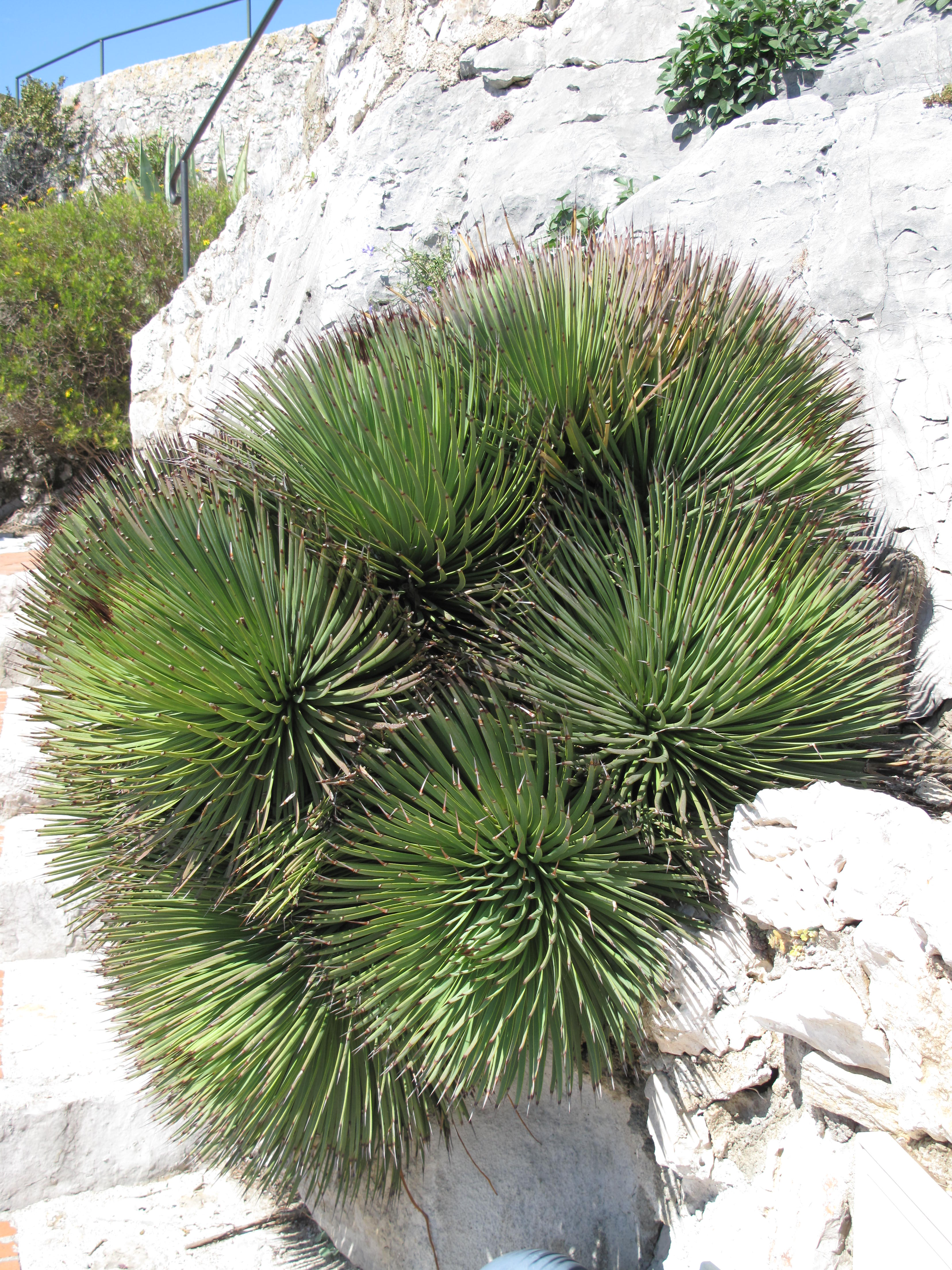

Conservation status
- Least Concern (IUCN 3.1)

Scientific classification
- Kingdom: Plantae
- Clade: Embryophytes
- Clade: Tracheophytes
- Clade: Spermatophytes
- Clade: Angiosperms
- Clade: Monocots
- Order: Asparagales
- Family: Asparagaceae
- Subfamily: Agavoideae
- Genus: Agave
- Species: A. stricta

Binomial name
- Agave stricta Salm-Dyck

Synonyms
- Agave echinoides Jacobi; Agave striata var. echinoides Baker; Agave striata fo. stricta (Salm-Dyck) Voss; Agave striata subsp. stricta (Salm-Dyck) B.Ullrich; Agave striata var. stricta (Salm-Dyck) Baker; Agave striata var. stricta (Salm-Dyck) Voss; Bonapartea stricta (Salm-Dyck) Vukot.

= Agave stricta =

Species of flowering plant

Agave stricta, the hedgehog agave, is a species of flowering plant in the family Asparagaceae, native to Puebla and Oaxaca in Southern Mexico. Growing to 50 cm (20 in) tall, it is an evergreen succulent with rosettes of narrow spiny leaves producing erect racemes, 2 m (7 ft) long, of reddish purple flowers in summer. The foliage may develop a red tinge in the summer.

The Latin specific epithet stricta means erect, or upright.

As this plant is known to produce pincushion-like offsets, or "pups", as it grows—an unusually polycarpic trait among the Agaves (a highly monocarpic group of plants)—a team of Mexican biologists and botanists proposed the formation of a new genus, Echinoagave, in January 2024. This would lead to a new (or synonymous) genus and species name of Echinoagave stricta, in addition to the potential reclassifying of ten or eleven other species. Other species considered for placement into Echinoagave include Agave albopilosa and Agave striata. The name is derived from the Greek word for "spiny", echînos.

Similarly to many succulents, A. stricta thrives on air flow, good lighting, and well-drained, mostly inert substrates, and may develop root rot if overwatered. With a minimum preferred temperature of 10 °C (50 °F), this plant requires dry and well-lit conditions, ranging from room-temperature to warm, during winter in temperate regions; in appropriate climates, it may be grown outdoors in full- or part-sun year-round, or during the spring and summer months, provided that excessive precipitation does not flood its roots. It has gained the Royal Horticultural Society's Award of Garden Merit.
