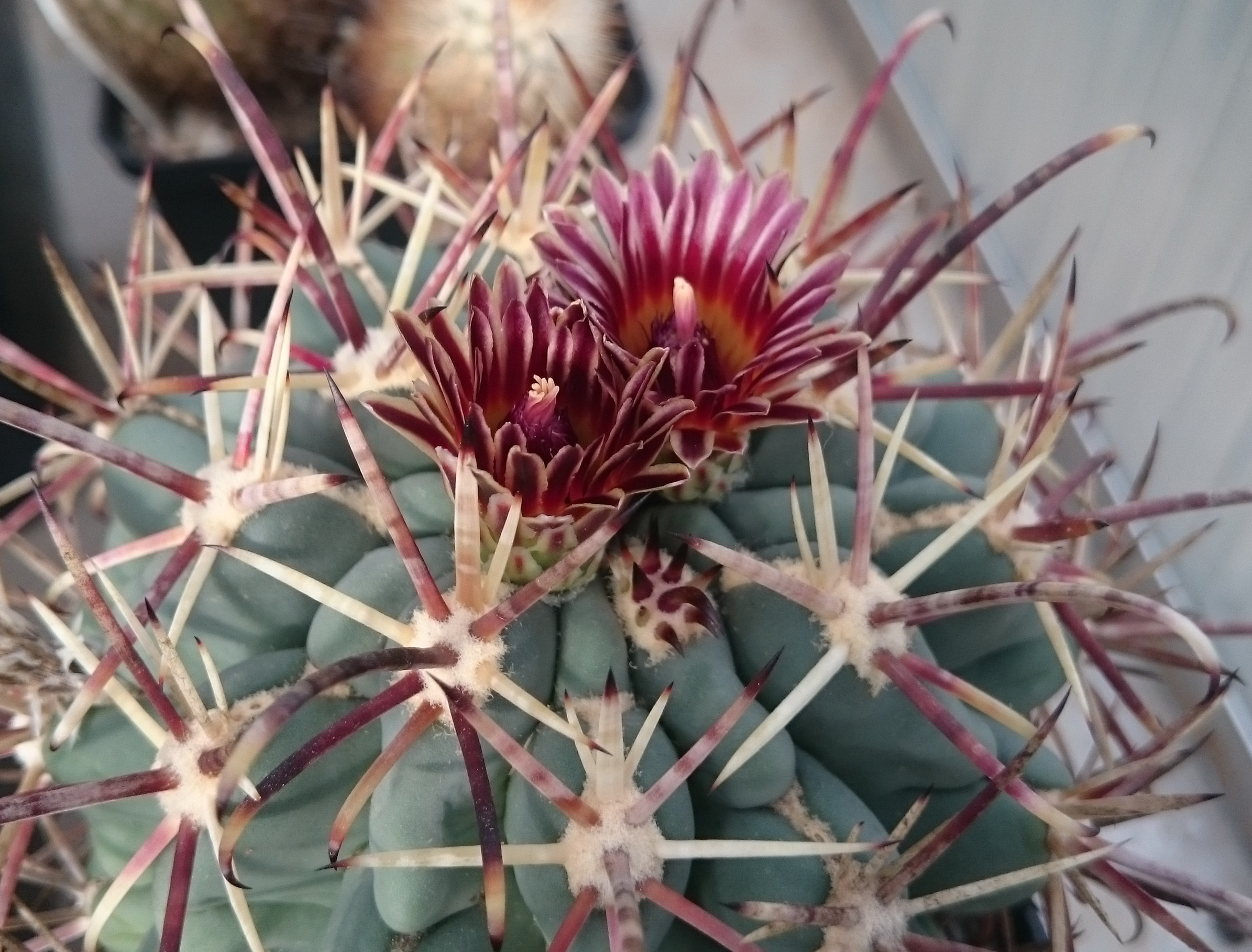

Scientific classification
- Kingdom: Plantae
- Clade: Embryophytes
- Clade: Tracheophytes
- Clade: Spermatophytes
- Clade: Angiosperms
- Clade: Eudicots
- Order: Caryophyllales
- Family: Cactaceae
- Subfamily: Cactoideae
- Genus: Glandulicactus
- Species: G. mathssonii

Binomial name
- Glandulicactus mathssonii (A.Berger ex K.Schum.) D.J.Ferguson

Synonyms
- List: Ancistrocactus crassihamatus (F.A.C.Weber ex Britton & Rose) L.D.Benson; Ancistrocactus mathssonii (A.Berger ex K.Schum.) Doweld; Ancistrocactus uncinatus subsp. crassihamatus (N.P.Taylor) Doweld; Echinocactus crassihamatus F.A.C.Weber ex Britton & Rose; Echinocactus mathssonii A.Berger ex K.Schum.; Glandulicactus crassihamatus Backeb.; Ferocactus mathssonii (A.Berger ex K.Schum.) N.P.Taylor; Hamatocactus crassihamatus Buxb.; Hamatocactus uncinatus subsp. crassihamatus (N.P.Taylor) Glass; Pediocactus uncinatus var. crassihamatus (F.A.C.Weber) Halda; Sclerocactus uncinatus var. crassihamatus N.P.Taylor; Sclerocactus uncinatus subsp. crassihamatus (N.P.Taylor) N.P.Taylor; Thelocactus crassihamatus W.T.Marshall; Cactus bicolor Berland. ex Engelm.; Ancistrocactus crassihamatus (F.A.C.Weber ex Britton & Rose) L.D.Benson; Ancistrocactus mathssonii (A.Berger ex K.Schum.) Doweld; Ancistrocactus uncinatus subsp. crassihamatus (N.P.Taylor) Doweld; Echinocactus crassihamatus F.A.C.Weber ex Britton & Rose; Echinocactus mathssonii A.Berger ex K.Schum.; Glandulicactus crassihamatus Backeb.; Glandulicactus mathssonii (A.Berger ex K.Schum.) D.J.Ferguson; Hamatocactus crassihamatus Buxb.; Hamatocactus uncinatus subsp. crassihamatus (N.P.Taylor) Glass; Pediocactus uncinatus var. crassihamatus (F.A.C.Weber) Halda; Sclerocactus uncinatus var. crassihamatus N.P.Taylor; Sclerocactus uncinatus subsp. crassihamatus (N.P.Taylor) N.P.Taylor; Thelocactus crassihamatus W.T.Marshall; Cactus bicolor Berland. ex Engelm.

= Glandulicactus mathssonii =

Species of cactus

Glandulicactus mathssonii is a species of Glandulicactus found in Mexico.

== Description ==
Glandulicactus mathssonii is a solitary cactus with attractive hooked central spines, occasionally branching from the base. Its flowers are a unique coppery color. The stems are flattened globular to egg-shaped, green to bluish-green with a grey glaucescence, up to 15 cm (5.9 in) tall and 8 cm (3.1 in) wide, with 9-13 prominent ribs and strongly tubercles, approximately 6-9 mm (0.35 in) broad and 9-15 mm (0.59 in) tall. Areoles are roundish, around 2-2.5 mm (0.098 in) apart, 3-5 mm (0.20 in) in diameter, with greyish-yellowish wool, and 1-4 curving, prominently hooked central spines that are 5-9 cm (3.5 in) long and 1-1.5 mm (0.059 in) wide, along with 3-8 radial spines. The spines are strong, tannish-white to greyish-pink or purple, slightly flattened, and do not obscure the stem. The plant produces several buds in spirals at the apex, with usually 3-5 or more flowers opening at a time. The flowers are cylindrical to funnel shaped, 2-4 cm (1.6 in) long and 2-3 cm (1.2 in) wide, with inner petals tannish to brick red, and outer tepals with brownish midribs. Filaments are yellow or maroon, up to 6 mm (0.24 in) long, with yellow anthers. The style is 1.2 cm (0.47 in) long, reddish, with stigma lobes 10-14, yellow or orange. The pericarpel has toothed scales up to 6 mm (0.24 in) long. The plant blooms from March to May, with flowers opening in the morning and closing partially at night, reopening for 2-3 days. Fruits are 1.5-2.5 cm (0.98 in) long, ovate to globose, fleshy, red, with black seeds that are 1.3-1.5 mm (0.059 in) long.

== Distribution ==
It grows in desert hills and flats, often on limestone-rich substrates, among desert shrubs or in open grassland, usually near grass clumps in Guanajuato to San Luis Potosí, Mexico.

== Taxonomy ==
The plant was first published without a description by Karl Moritz Schumann as Echinocereus mathssonii in 1893.
