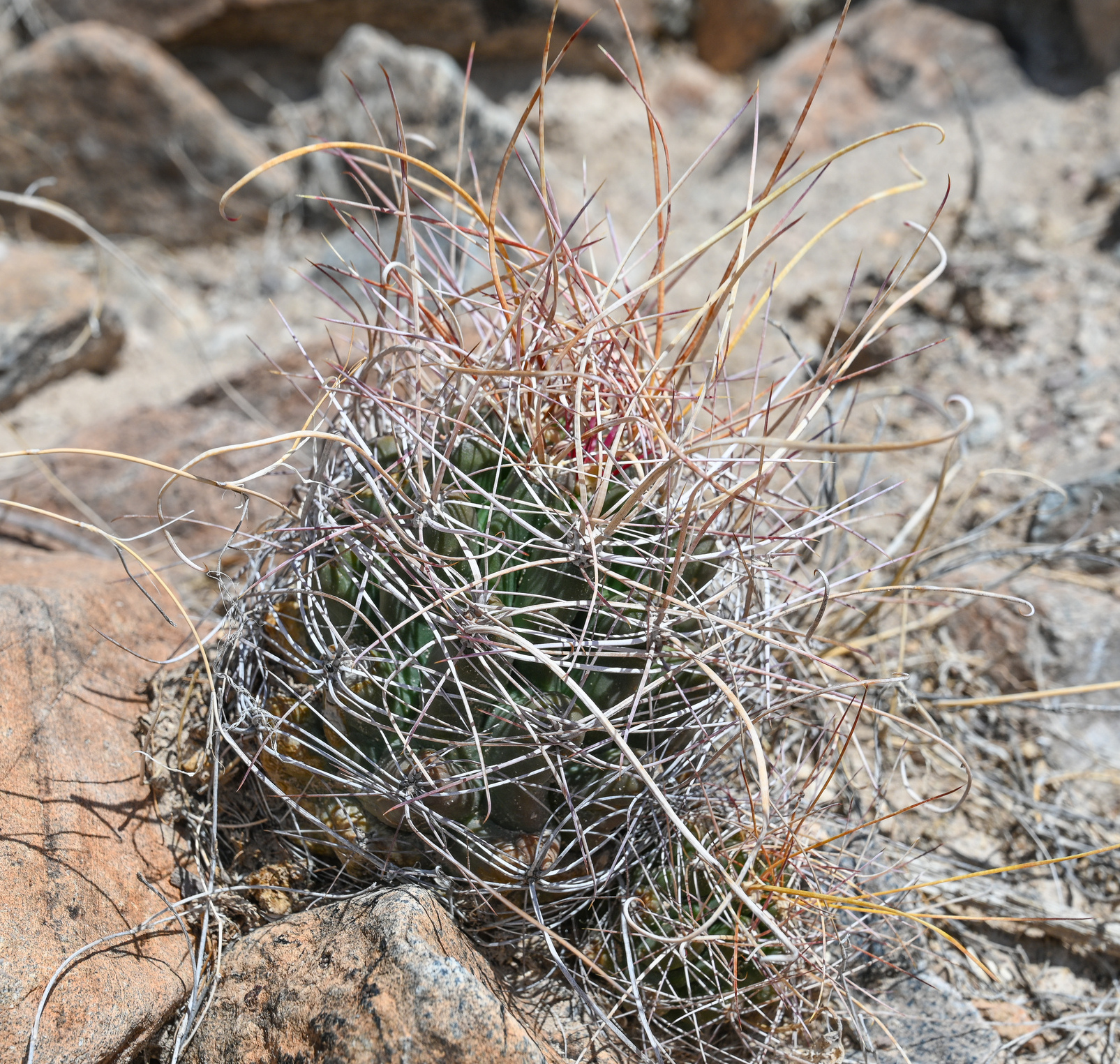
- Glandulicactus uncinatus

Scientific classification
- Kingdom: Plantae
- Clade: Embryophytes
- Clade: Tracheophytes
- Clade: Spermatophytes
- Clade: Angiosperms
- Clade: Eudicots
- Order: Caryophyllales
- Family: Cactaceae
- Subfamily: Cactoideae
- Tribe: Cacteae
- Genus: Glandulicactus; Backeb.

Type species
- Glandulicactus uncinatus

Species
- See text.

= Glandulicactus =

Genus of cacti

Glandulicactus is a genus of plants native to Mexico and the United States.

== Description ==
Plants in this genus are distinguished by their hooked spines, tubercular ribs, and extra floral nectaries.

== Distribution ==
Plants in this genus is found from The southern United States from New Mexico and Texas, south to the Mexican states of Guanajuato, Tamaulipas, and San Luis Potosí.

== Taxonomy ==
The genus was first described and published by Curt Backeberg in 1938, who named the genus after the nectar glands in the areoles of the plants.

== Species ==
As of June 2026, Plants of the World Online accepts two species:

Image	Scientific name	Distribution
	Glandulicactus mathssonii (A.Berger ex K.Schum.) D.J.Ferguson 1991	Mexico (Guanajuato to San Luis Potosí)
	Glandulicactus uncinatus (Galeotti) Backeb. 1939	Mexico (Coahuila, Nuevo León, and Tamaulipas), New Mexico, Texas
