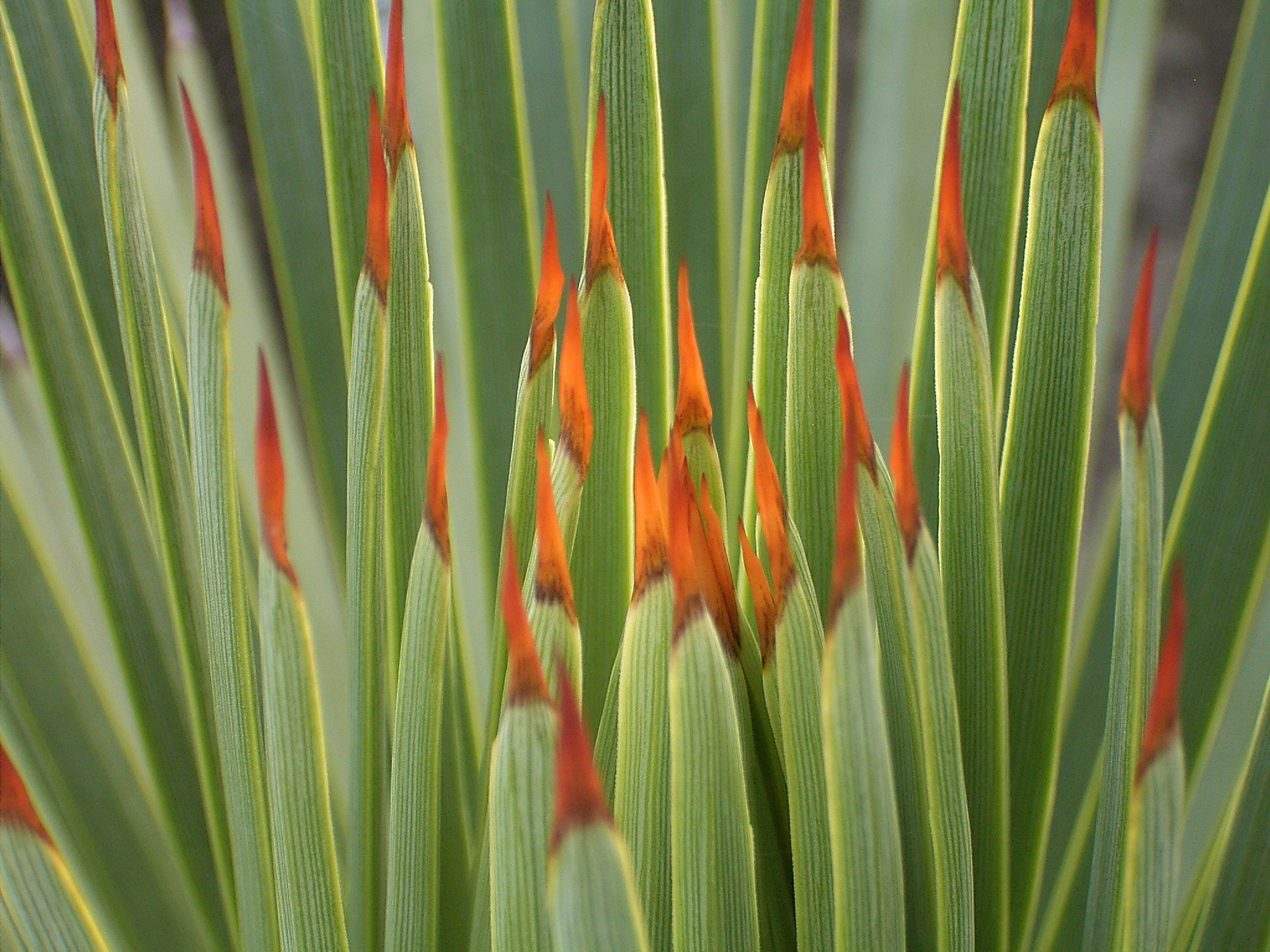

Conservation status
- Least Concern (IUCN 3.1)

Scientific classification
- Kingdom: Plantae
- Clade: Tracheophytes
- Clade: Angiosperms
- Clade: Monocots
- Order: Asparagales
- Family: Asparagaceae
- Subfamily: Agavoideae
- Genus: Agave
- Species: A. striata

Binomial name
- Agave striata Zucc.

Synonyms
- Agave californica Baker; Agave californica Jacobi; Agave echinoides Jacobi; Agave ensiformis Baker; Agave falcata Engelm.; Agave hystrix (Pasq.) Baker; Agave paucifolia Baker; Agave paucifolia Tod.; Agave recurva Zucc.; Agave richardsii Baker; Bonapartea hystrix Pasq.

= Agave striata =

Species of flowering plant

Agave striata is a plant species native to Northeastern Mexico. Because the species is widespread and does not appear to be under any significant threats, it is not considered by the IUCN to be threatened.

== Description ==
A. striata forms rosettes of hundreds of thin, narrow leaves, 60 cm (2 feet) long and 1.0 cm (0.4 inches) wide. The leaves stick straight out or arch gently upward toward the center of the plant, each ending in a very sharp, brown and black spine. The flower spike is up to 3 m (10 feet) tall and bears whitish yellow flowers 3.0-4.0 cm (1.2-1.6) inches in diameter. In the wild, numerous suckers result in thick clusters of plants growing to form impenetrable thickets.
