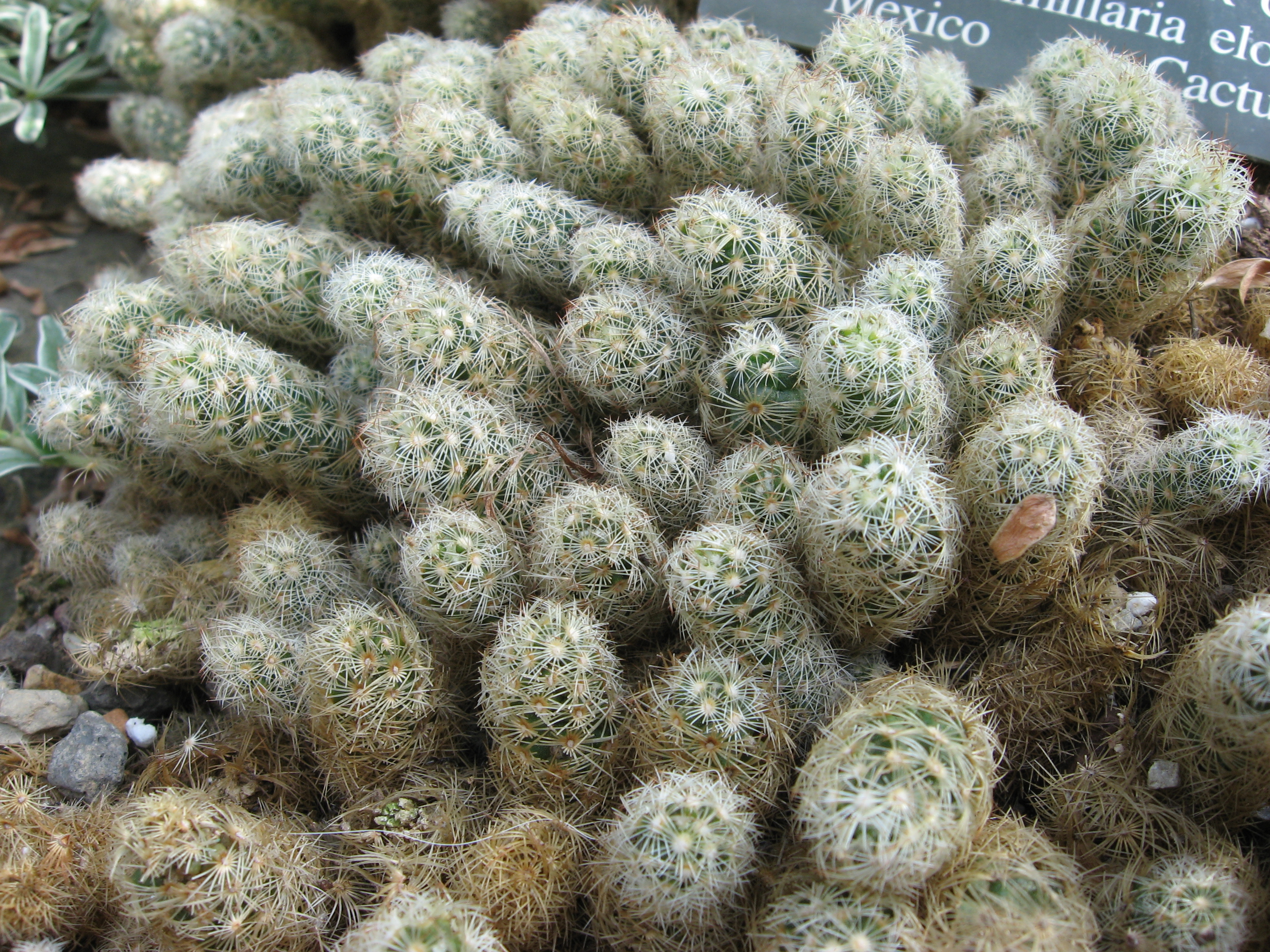

Scientific classification
- Kingdom: Plantae
- Clade: Tracheophytes
- Clade: Angiosperms
- Clade: Eudicots
- Order: Caryophyllales
- Family: Cactaceae
- Subfamily: Cactoideae
- Genus: Mammillaria
- Species: M. elongata

Binomial name
- Mammillaria elongata DC.

= Mammillaria elongata =

Species of cactus

Mammillaria elongata DC., the gold lace cactus or ladyfinger cactus, is a species of flowering plant in the family Cactaceae, native to central Mexico. The species has slender stems that begin to produce offsets at an early stage and eventually form clusters. Spine colour is highly variable, ranging from very pale yellow through red to nearly black. The small, pale yellow flowers are inconspicuous among the spines. It is among the most common and most variable of its genus in nature, and is a popular subject for cultivation. It has gained the Royal Horticultural Society's Award of Garden Merit.

== Description ==
The cactus forms dense groups of cylindrical, erect or semi-prostrate stems about 6 to 15 cm long and 1.5 to 3.7 cm in diameter. Its body, bright green, is formed by short conical tubercles (2 to 4 mm) ending in round and woolly areoles in the young segments, unlike tubercular axils that lack wooliness. It has between 15 and 30 short radial spines (6 to 12 mm), curved outwards that intersect with those of the nearby areoles and 1 to 3 central (sometimes absent) yellow or golden color. The flowers arise on the upper part of the stems and are 1.5 cm in length and diameter, with pale yellow or white toothed petals, sometimes with a darker or reddish central line. The fruits are cylindrical to globose, brown or red, with a large number of seeds. Blooms profusely between late winter and early summer.

== Distribution, Taxonomy and Conservation Status ==
The species occurs in the Mexican states of Hidalgo, Guanajuato and Querétaro. The nominate form predominates in Hidalgo, although it is reported to be relatively rare. It has more slender stems and rarely develops central spines. In Querétaro and Guanajuato, populations with more robust stems and predominantly yellow spines are widespread and frequent. De Candolle treated these populations as a separate species, Mammillaria echinaria.

De Candolle described Mammillaria elongata in 1828 from plants obtained from Coulter. Differences in the degree of offset production, stem diameter and spine colour have led to the naming of numerous variants. Most of these represent selections are made in cultivation (Cultivars), and their formal taxonomic recognition is considered unwarranted. Two subspecies are distinguished:

- Mammillaria elongata subsp. elongata DC.:

The nominate form generally lacks central spines, though occasionally two short ones may be present.

- Mammillaria elongata subsp. echinaria (DC.) D.R. Hunt:

This taxon consistently bears longer central spines, which gives the plants a more bristly appearance. In 1997, David Richard Hunt reclassified it as a subspecies of Mammillaria elongata.

On the IUCN Red List of Threatened Species, the species is categorized as "Least Concern (LC)", meaning it is not considered to be at risk.

== Cultivars ==
- 'Copper King'
- 'Cristata' (Brain Cactus)
- 'Golden Nugget'
- 'Golden Stars'
- 'Julio'
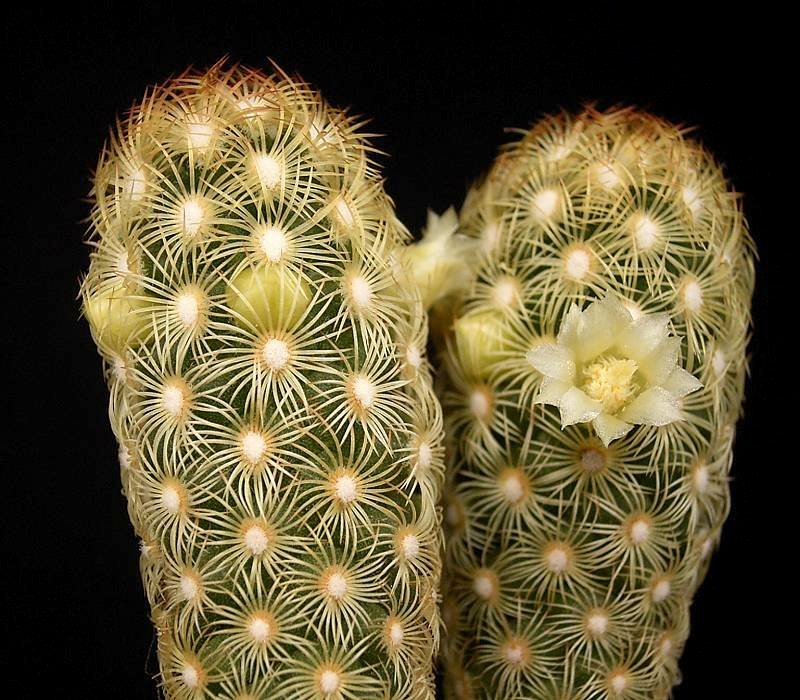
flowers

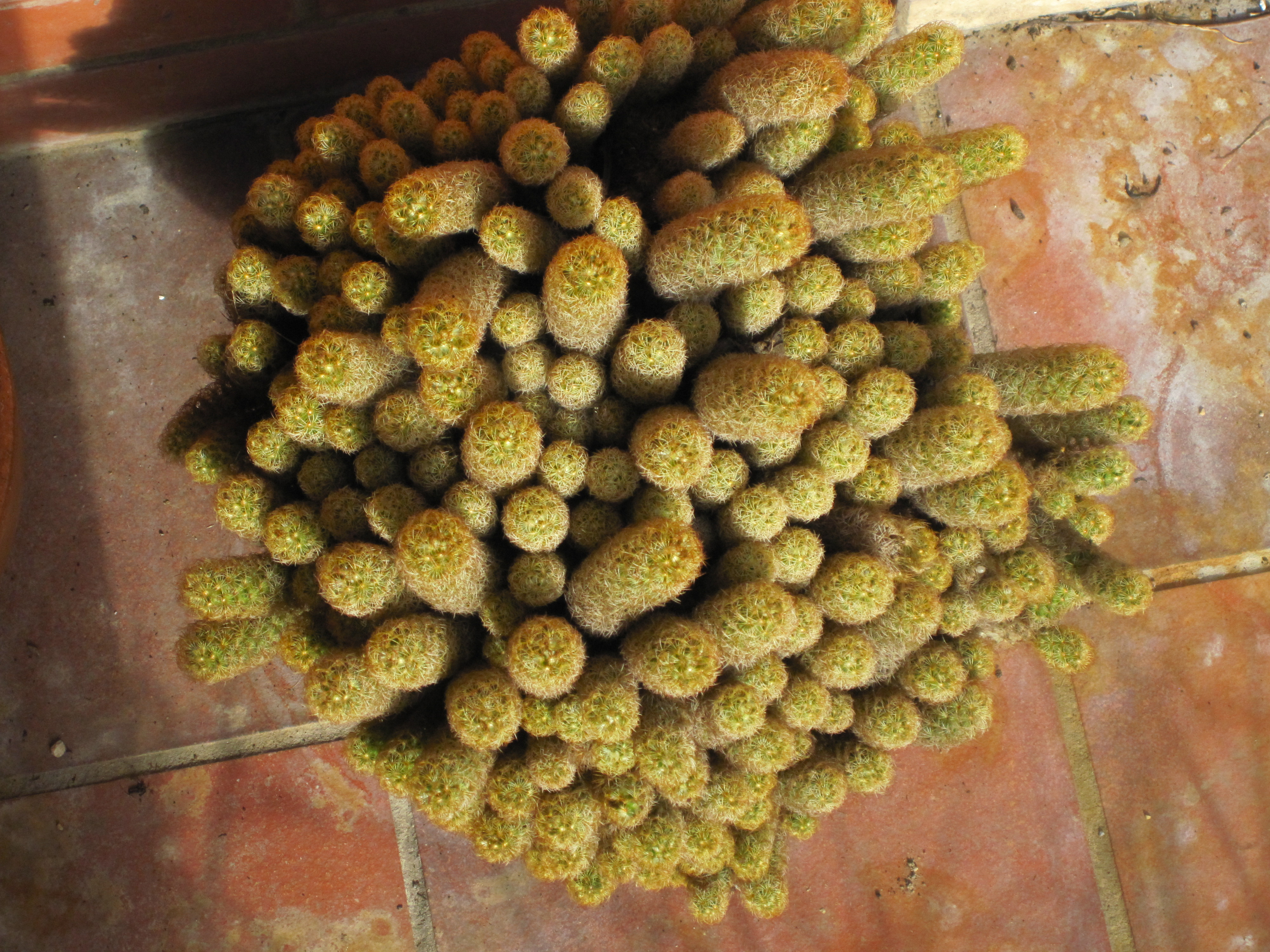
Mammillaria elongata

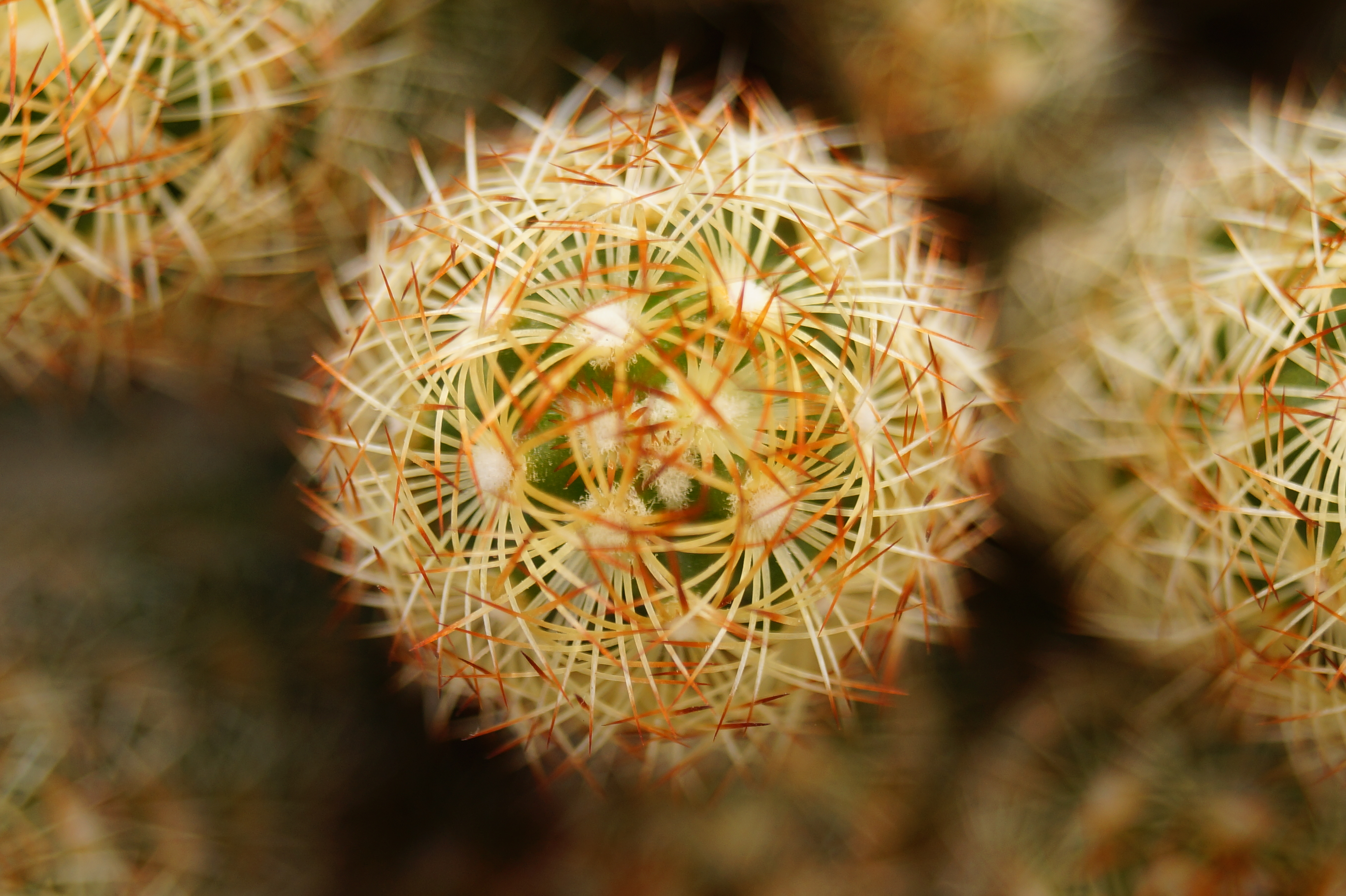
Top view of Lady finger cactus

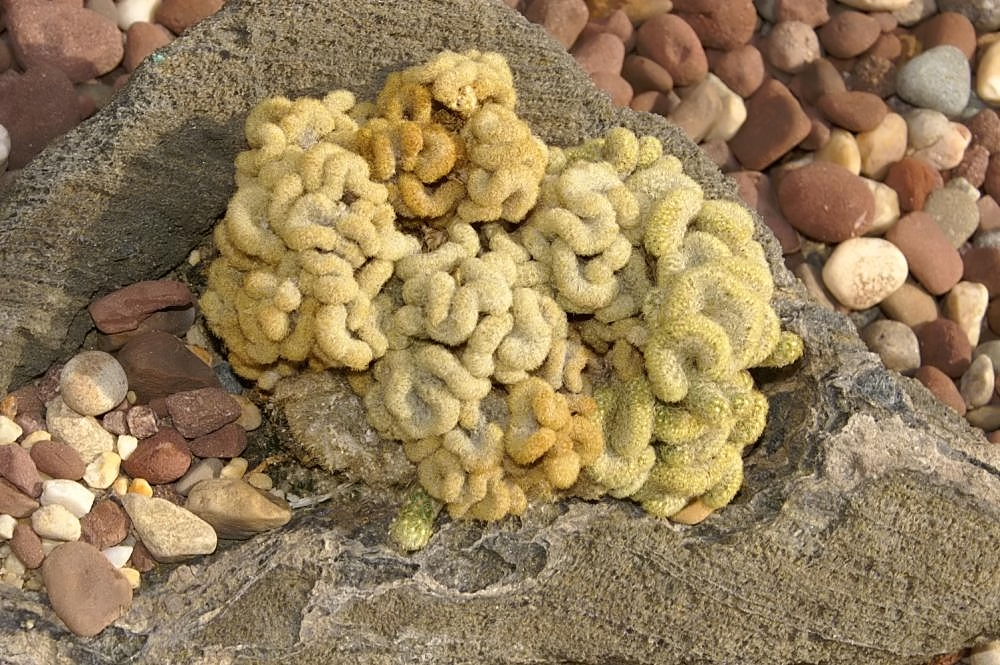
Brain cactus, Mammillaria elongata Cristata
