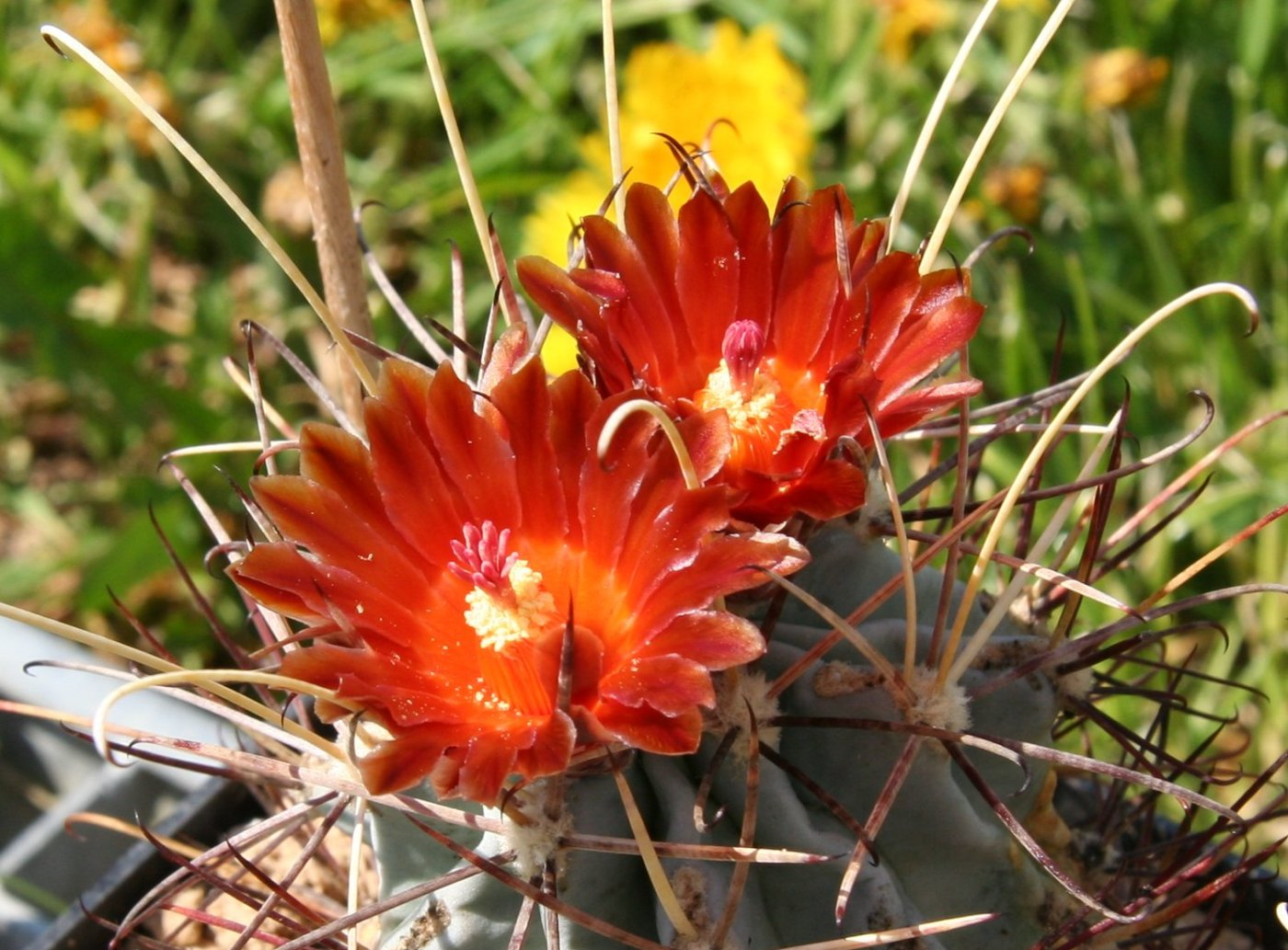

Conservation status
- Least Concern (IUCN 3.1)

Scientific classification
- Kingdom: Plantae
- Clade: Embryophytes
- Clade: Tracheophytes
- Clade: Spermatophytes
- Clade: Angiosperms
- Clade: Eudicots
- Order: Caryophyllales
- Family: Cactaceae
- Subfamily: Cactoideae
- Genus: Glandulicactus
- Species: G. uncinatus

Binomial name
- Glandulicactus uncinatus (Galeotti) Backeb.

Synonyms
- List: Ancistrocactus uncinatus (Galeotti) L.D.Benson; Echinocactus uncinatus Galeotti; Echinomastus uncinatus (Galeotti) F.M.Knuth; Ferocactus uncinatus (Galeotti) Britton & Rose; Hamatocactus uncinatus (Galeotti) Orcutt; Pediocactus uncinatus (Galeotti) Halda; Sclerocactus uncinatus (Galeotti) N.P.Taylor; Thelocactus uncinatus (Galeotti) W.T.Marshall; Ancistrocactus uncinatus var. wrightii (Engelm.) L.D.Benson; Ancistrocactus uncinatus subsp. wrightii (Engelm.) Doweld; Echinocactus ancylacanthus Monv. ex Labour.; Echinocactus trollietii Rebut; Echinocactus uncinatus f. wrightii (Engelm.) Schelle; Echinocactus uncinatus var. wrightii Engelm.; Echinocactus wrightii (Engelm.) Small; Ferocactus uncinatus var. wrightii (Engelm.) N.P.Taylor; Glandulicactus uncinatus var. wrightii (Engelm.) Backeb.; Glandulicactus uncinatus subsp. wrightii (Engelm.) U.Guzmán; Glandulicactus wrightii (Engelm.) D.J.Ferguson; Hamatocactus uncinatus var. wrightii (Engelm.) Bravo; Hamatocactus wrightii (Engelm.) Orcutt; Pediocactus uncinatus var. wrightii (Engelm.) Halda; Sclerocactus uncinatus subsp. wrightii (Engelm.) N.P.Taylor; Sclerocactus uncinatus var. wrightii (Engelm.) N.P.Taylor; Thelocactus uncinatus var. wrightii (Engelm.) H.P.Kelsey & Dayton

= Glandulicactus uncinatus =

Species of cactus

Glandulicactus uncinatus is a species of Glandulicactus found in Mexico and United States in Texas.

== Description ==
Glandulicactus uncinatus typically grows alone, with bluish-green, spherical to cylindrical shoots ranging from 18 to 27 cm (7.1 to 10.6 in) in height and 10 to 12 cm (3.9 to 4.7 in) in diameter. It has about 13 wavy ribs with pronounced tubercles, and sharp furrows between the ridges. The one to five central spines are hook-shaped, yellow with a reddish tip, and 8 to 13 cm (3.1 to 5.1 in) long, pointing upwards or obliquely outwards. There are seven to ten radial spines, 2.5 to 5 cm (0.98 to 1.97 in) long, with the upper ones flat and brightly colored, and the lower ones hook-shaped and somewhat purple.

Its funnel-shaped flowers, reddish-brown in color, emerge from the furrows of the areoles. They are 2 to 4 cm (0.79 to 1.57 in) long and have a diameter of 2.5 to 3 cm (0.98 to 1.18 in).

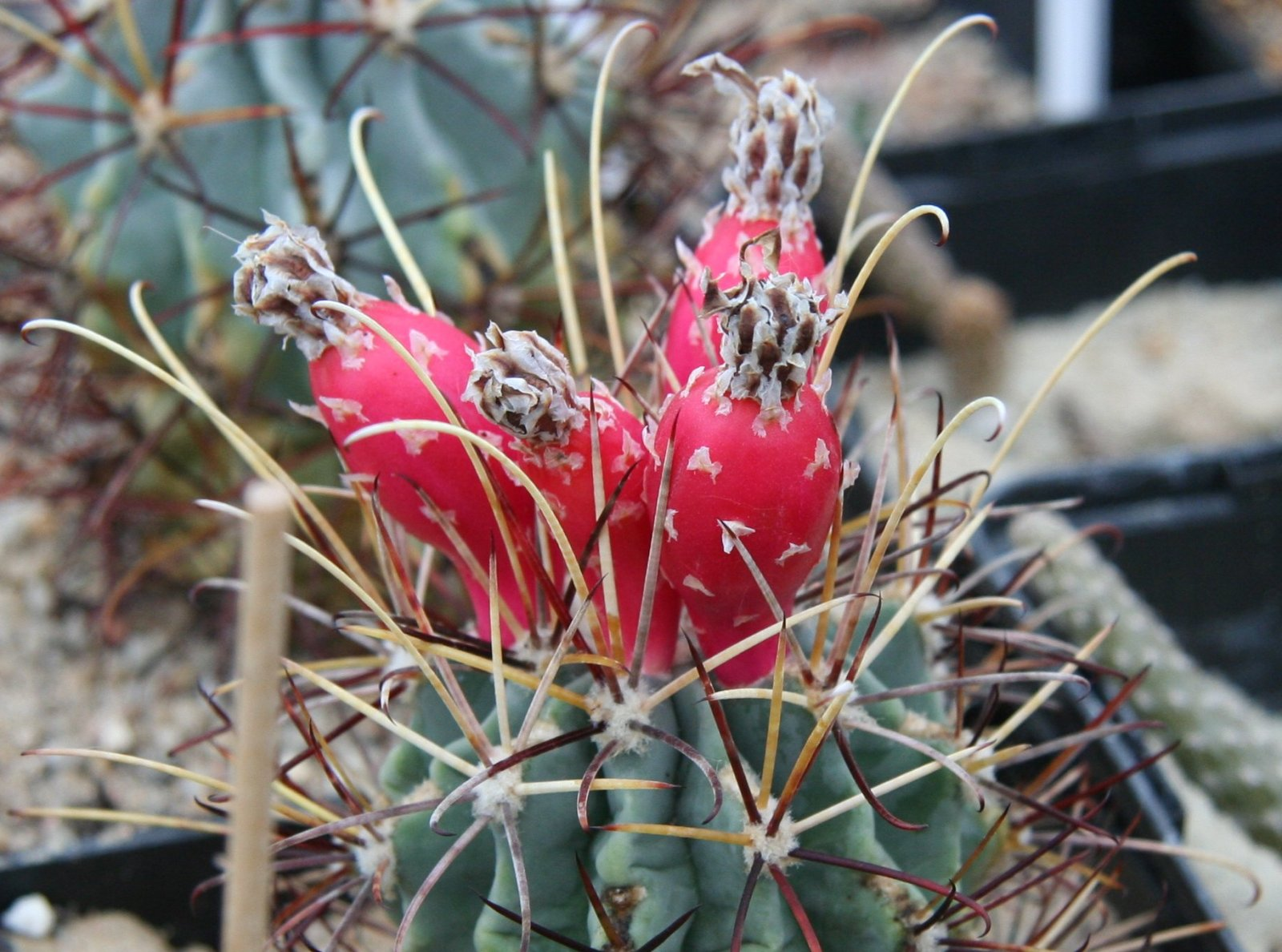
Fruits

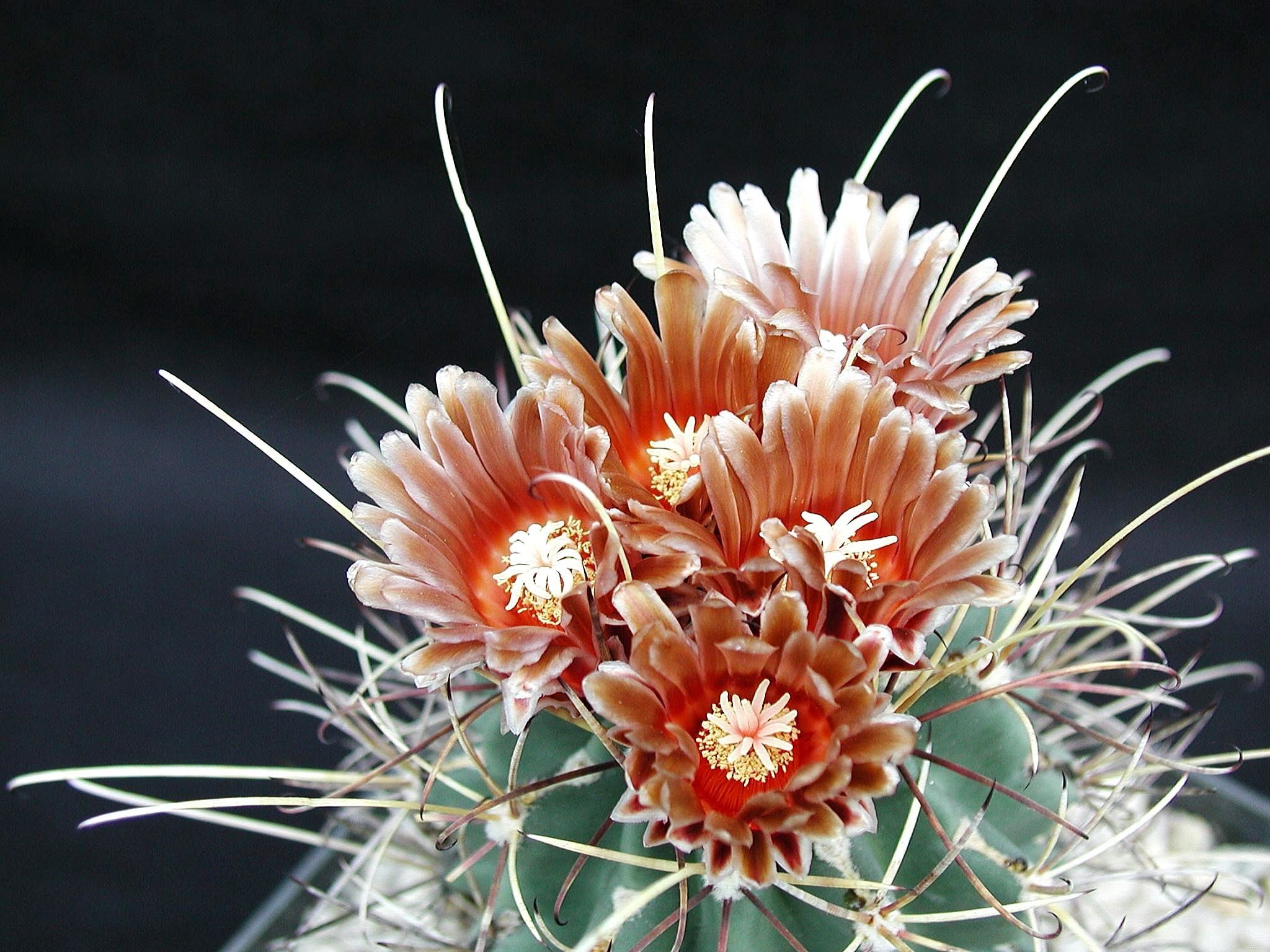
Flowers

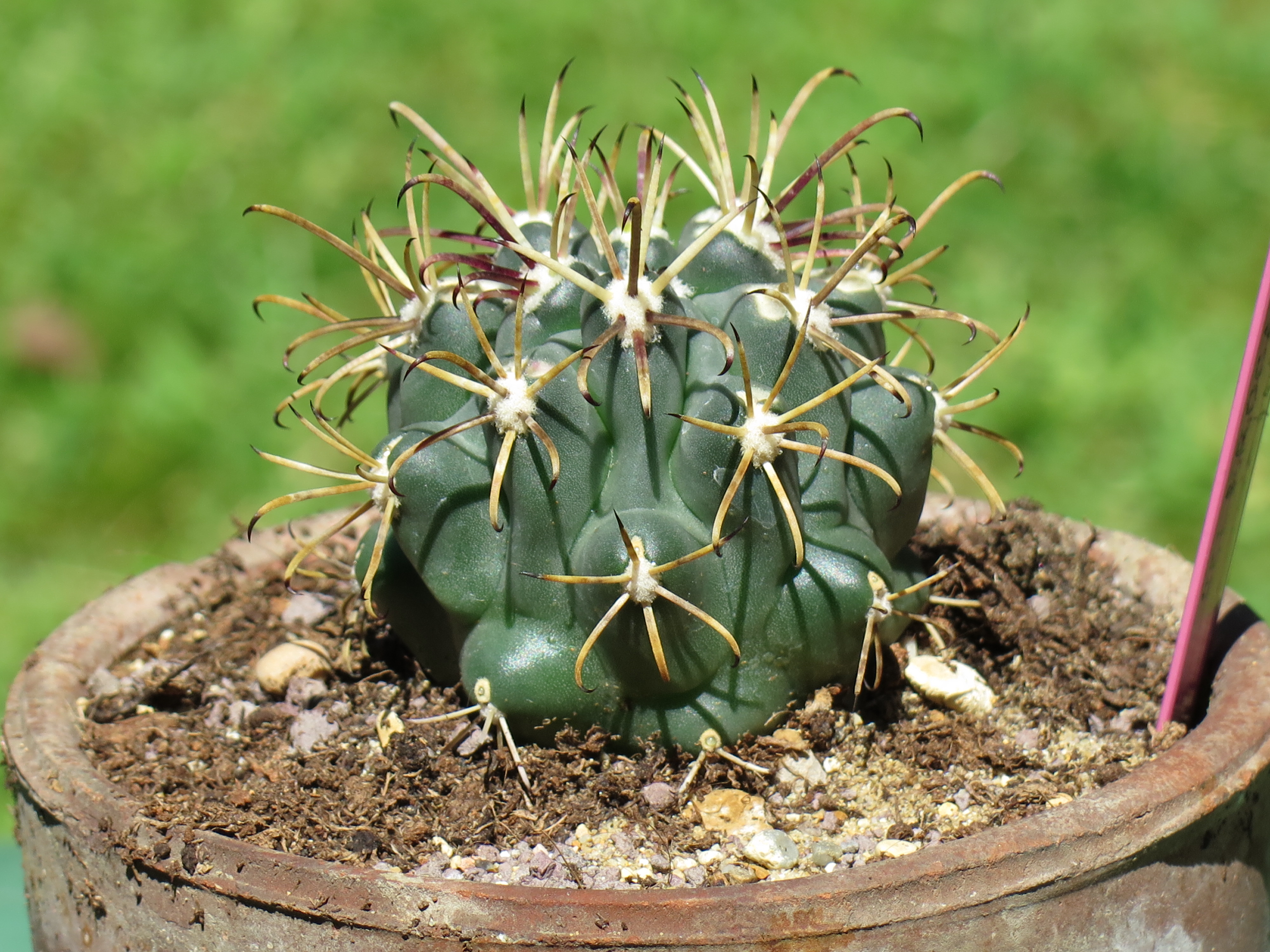
Plant

== Distribution ==
Glandulicactus uncinatus is found in southern Texas, New Mexico, and in the Mexican states of Coahuila, Nuevo León, and Tamaulipas growing in scrub and limestone or calcareous soils at elevations of 900 to 1550 meters.

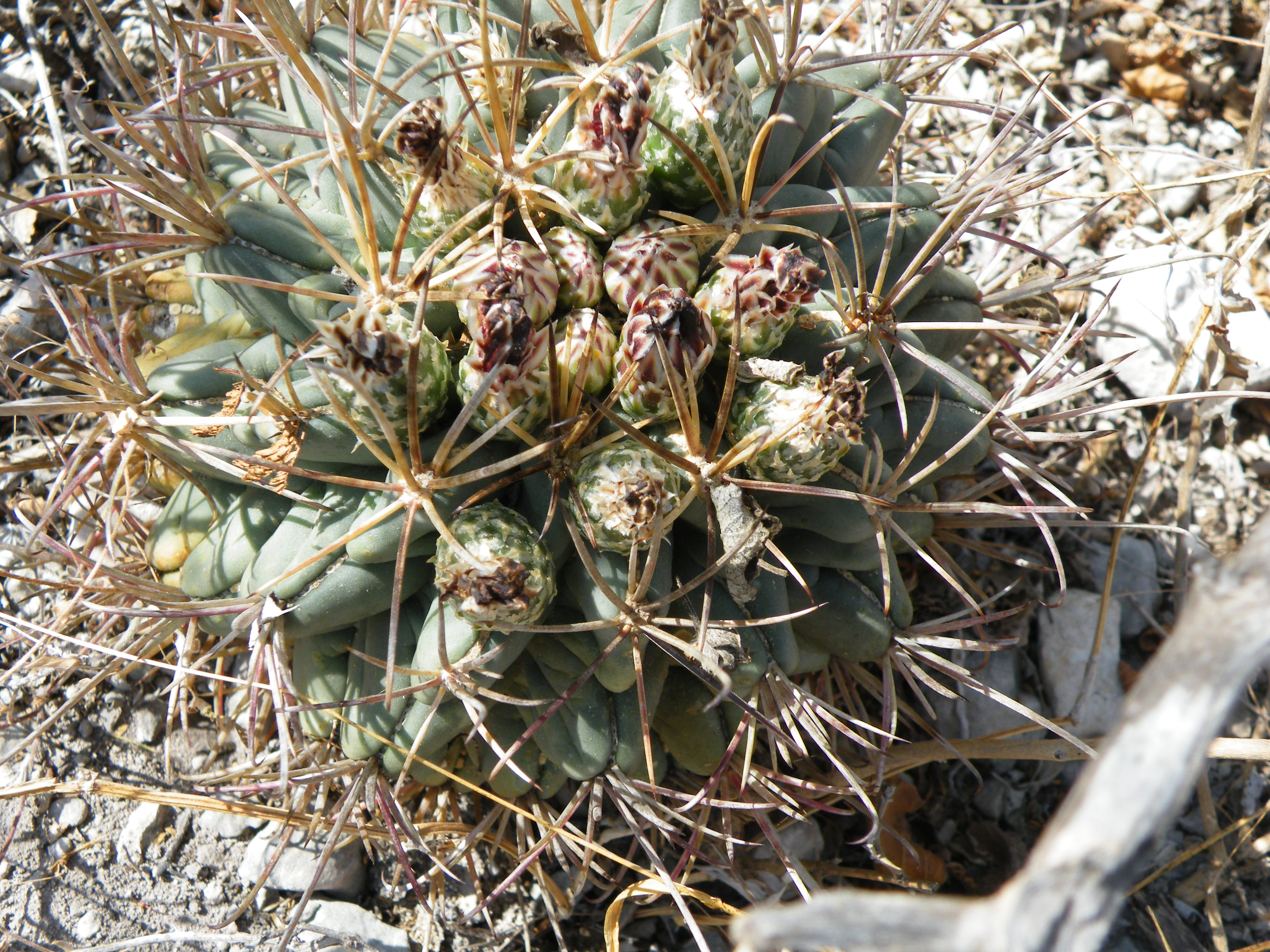
Plant growing near Las Tablas, San Luis Potosi

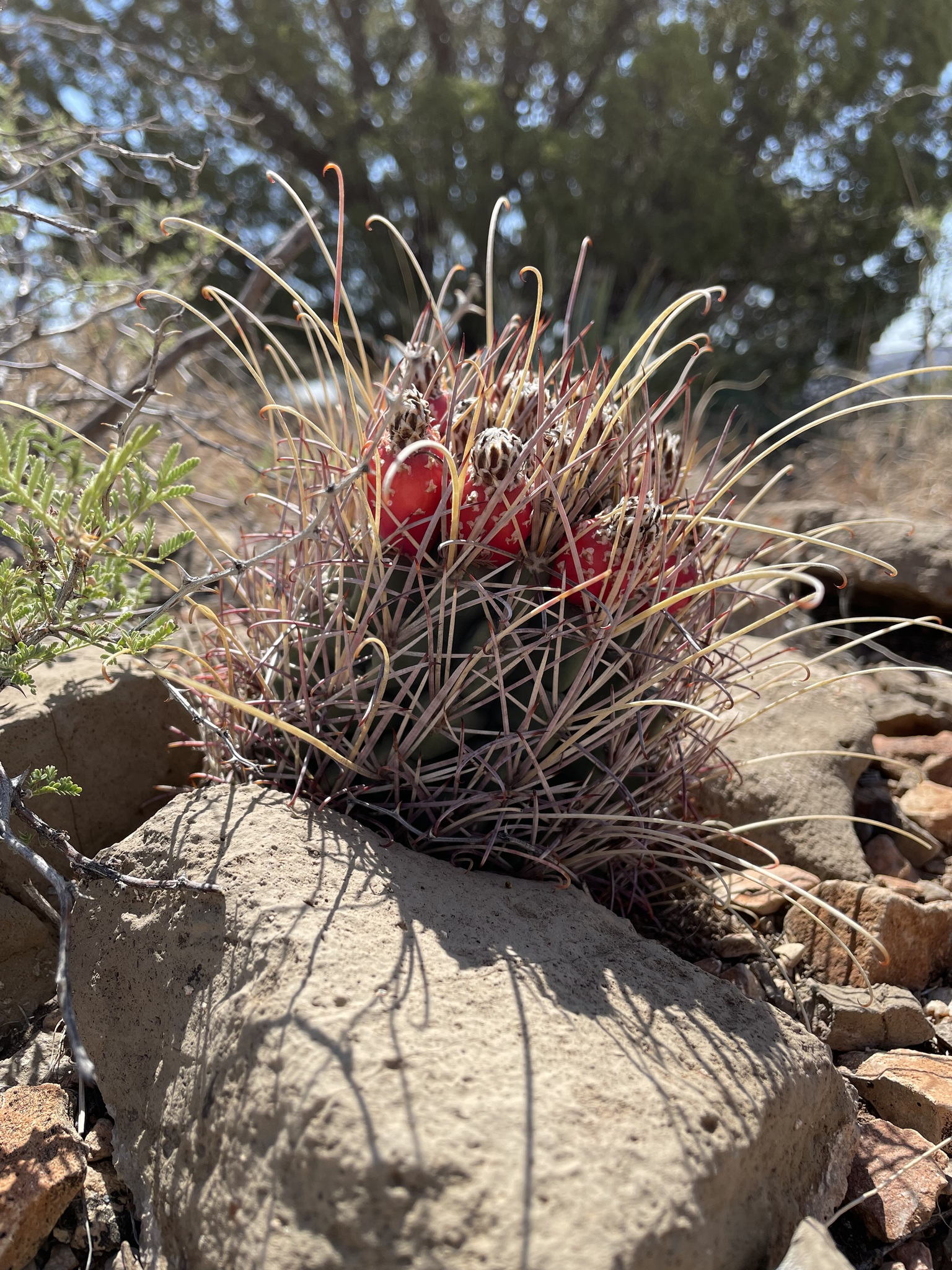
Plant fruiting in New Mexico

== Taxonomy ==
The species was first described as Echinocactus uncinatus by Ludwig Georg Karl Pfeiffer in 1848. The specific epithet "uncinatus" comes from Latin, meaning "hooked," referring to the hook-shaped central thorns of the species. Nathaniel Lord Britton and Joseph Nelson Rose moved the species to the genus Ferocactus in 1922. This species was moved to the genus Glandulicactus by Curt Backeberg.
