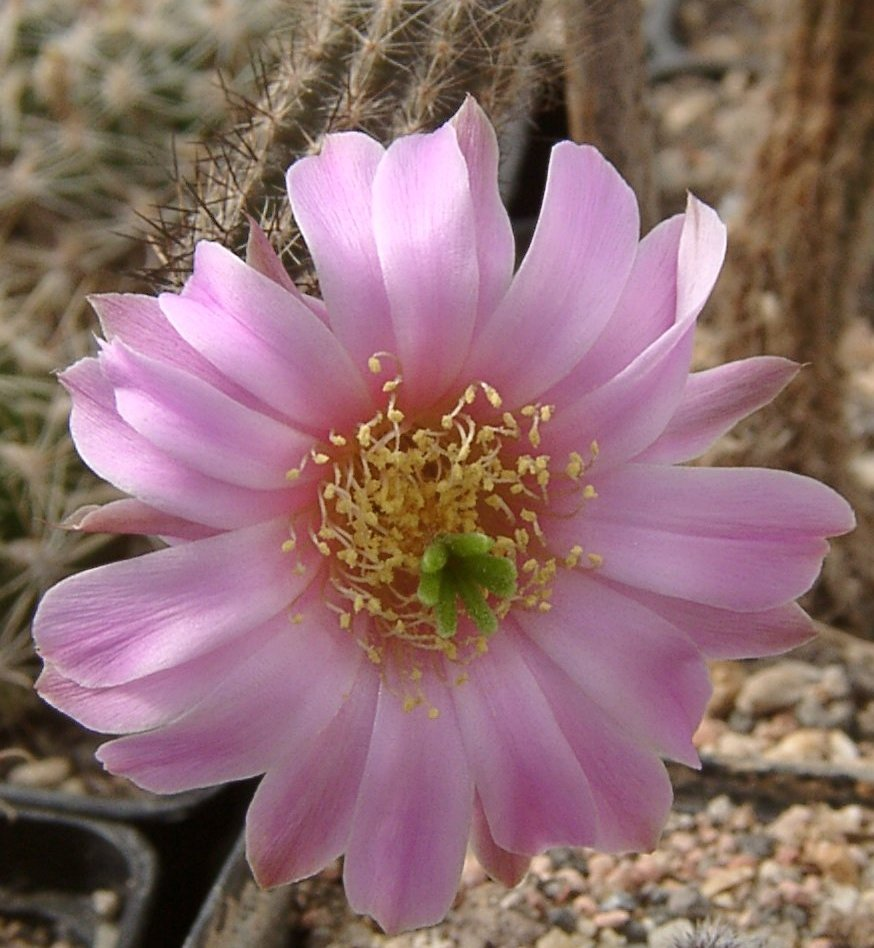

Conservation status
- Endangered (IUCN 3.1)

Scientific classification
- Kingdom: Plantae
- Clade: Tracheophytes
- Clade: Angiosperms
- Clade: Eudicots
- Order: Caryophyllales
- Family: Cactaceae
- Subfamily: Cactoideae
- Genus: Echinocereus
- Species: E. schmollii

Binomial name
- Echinocereus schmollii (Weing.) N.P.Taylor 1985

Synonyms
- Cereus schmollii Weing. 1931; Wilcoxia schmollii (Weing.) Backeb. 1935; Wilcoxia nerispina A.Cartier 1980; Wilcoxia schmollii var. lanata A.Cartier 1980

= Echinocereus schmollii =

Species of cactus

Echinocereus schmollii is a species of cactus native to Mexico.

== Description ==
Echinocereus schmollii typically grows solitary with cylindrical, purple to blackish shoots up to 25 cm (9.8 in) long and 1 cm (0.39 in) in diameter. The roots are slightly thickened. The plant has nine to ten rounded, tuberculated ribs and up to 35 pink hair-like thorns that create a woolly appearance, which turn white or darker and can be up to 7 mm (0.28 in) long.

The bright pink, funnel-shaped flowers appear near the tips of the shoots, measuring 3 to 5 cm (1.2 to 2.0 in) long and up to 6 cm (2.4 in) in diameter. The juicy, egg-shaped to spherical fruits are slightly purple-green.

== Distribution ==
Echinocereus schmollii is found in the Mexican state of Querétaro growing in the Chihuahuan Desert at elevations around 1,660 to 1,890 m (5,450 to 6,200 ft). It is found growing along with Astrophytum caput-medusae.

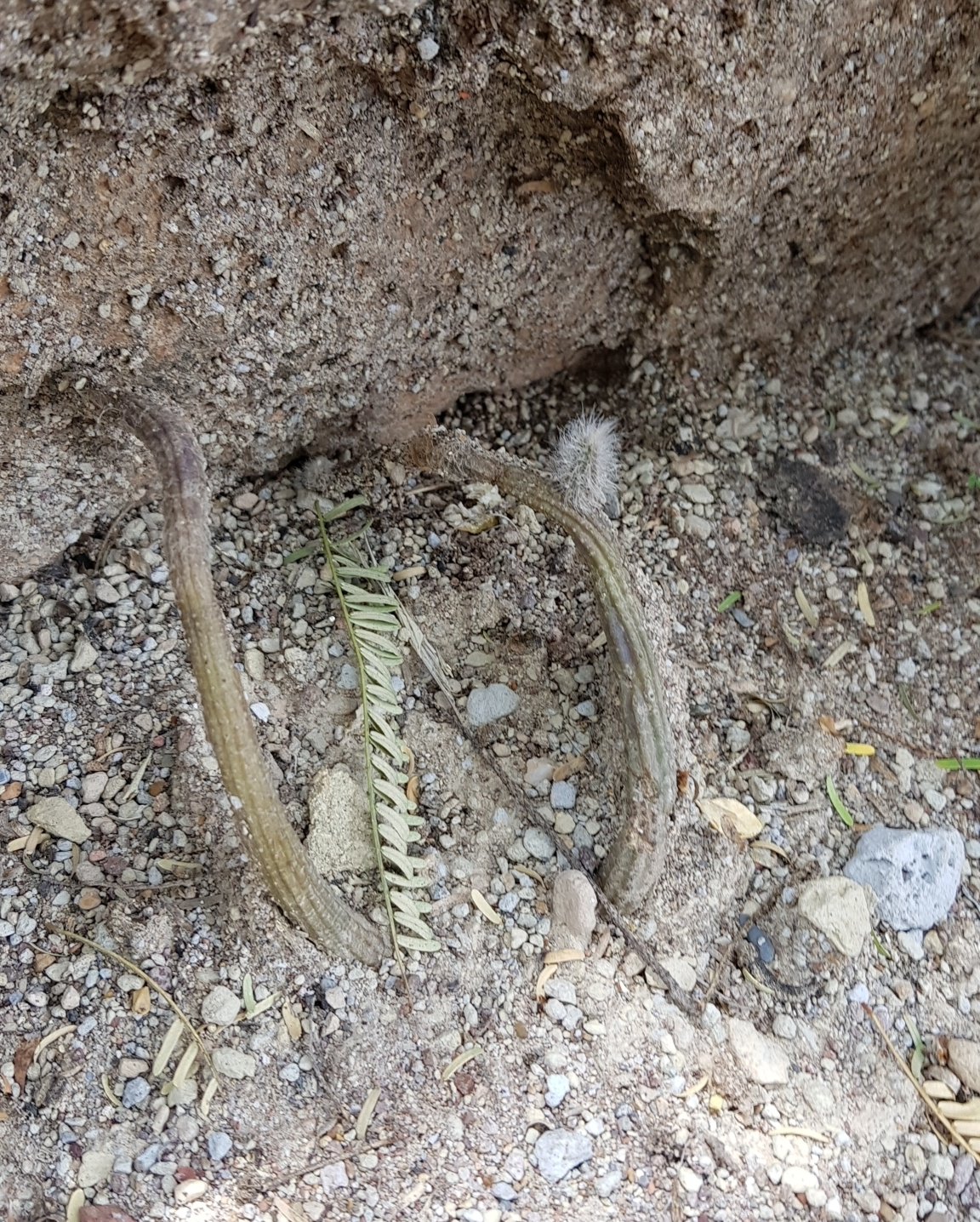
Habitat in Querétaro, Mexico

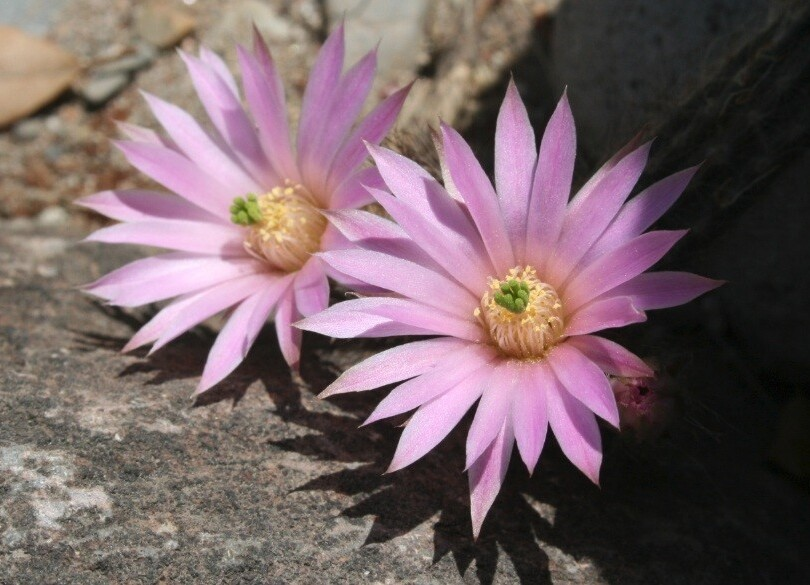
Plant blooming in Querétaro

== Taxonomy ==
First described as Cereus schmollii in 1931 by Wilhelm Weingart, the specific epithet honors German artist and cactus collector Ferdinand Schmoll. Nigel Paul Taylor reclassified it to the genus Echinocereus in 1985.
