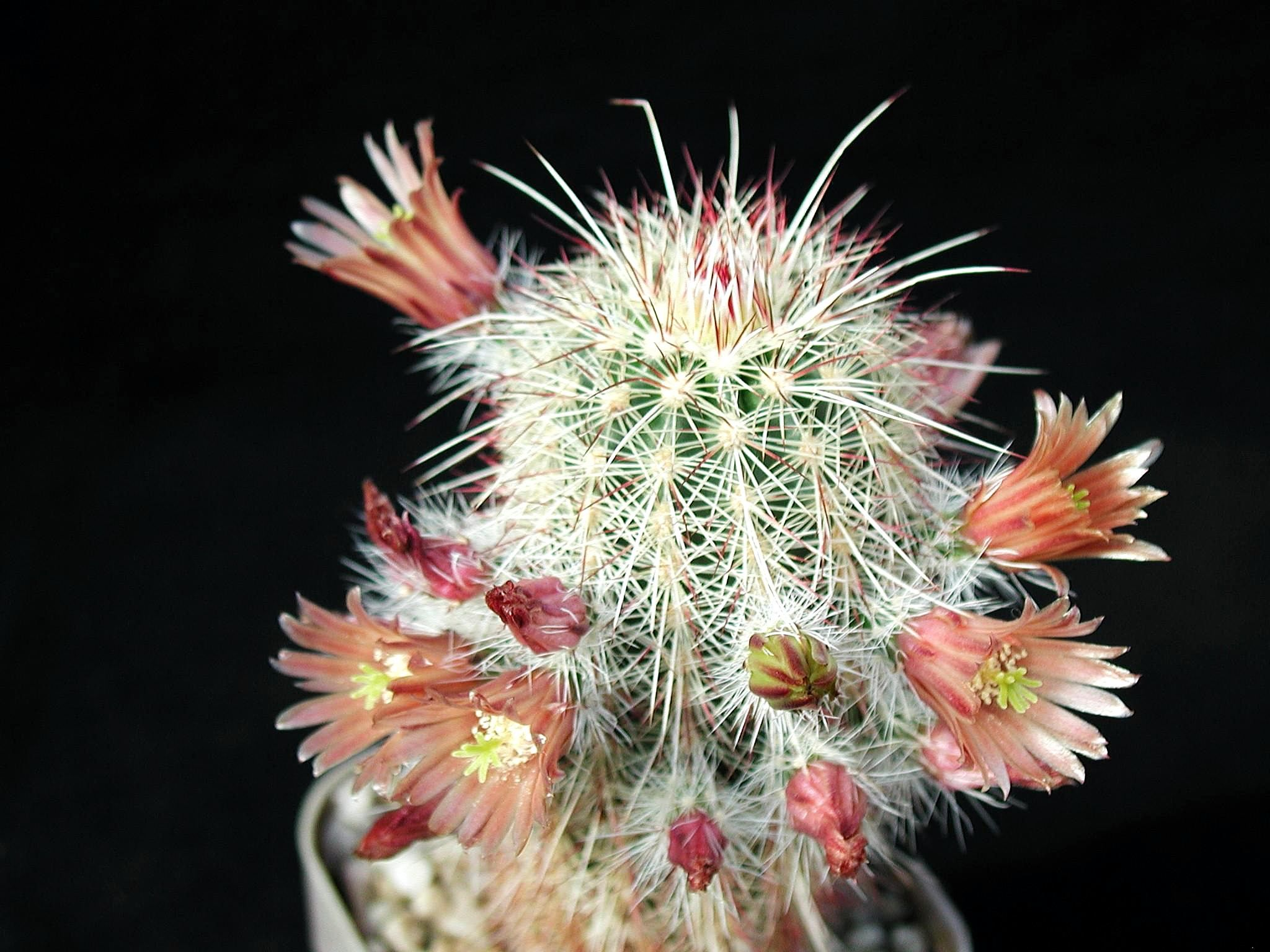

Conservation status
- Least Concern (IUCN 3.1)

Scientific classification
- Kingdom: Plantae
- Clade: Tracheophytes
- Clade: Angiosperms
- Clade: Eudicots
- Order: Caryophyllales
- Family: Cactaceae
- Subfamily: Cactoideae
- Genus: Echinocereus
- Species: E. russanthus

Binomial name
- Echinocereus russanthus D.Weniger, 1969

Synonyms
- Echinocereus chloranthus var. russanthus (D.Weniger) J.G.Lamb. ex Rowley 1972 publ. 1974; Echinocereus choranthus var. russanthus (D.Weniger) J.G.Lamb. 1972 publ. 1974; Echinocereus viridiflorus var. russanthus (D.Weniger) A.D.Zimmerman 2004; Echinocereus russanthus subsp. fiehnii (Trocha) W.Blum & Mich.Lange 1998; Echinocereus russanthus var. fiehnii Trocha 1997

= Echinocereus russanthus =

Species of cactus

Echinocereus russanthus is a species of cactus native to Texas and Mexico.

== Description ==
Echinocereus russanthus typically grows solitary or branches from the base. Its upright, cylindrical stems are 7.5 to 25 cm (3.0 to 9.8 in) long and 5 to 7.5 cm (2.0 to 3.0 in) in diameter, covered by thorns. The plant has 10 to 18 ribs that are distinctly tuberculated. It features 7 to 12 spreading central spines that are red, cream, or brownish, up to 3 cm (1.2 in) long, and 30 to 45 reddish to brownish radial spines, up to 1.8 cm (0.71 in) long.

The short, funnel-shaped flowers are light to bright red and often appear in clumps on the sides of the shoots, sometimes not fully opening. The flowers are 2.5 to 3 cm (0.98 to 1.18 in) long and wide. The green, spherical fruits are heavily thorny.

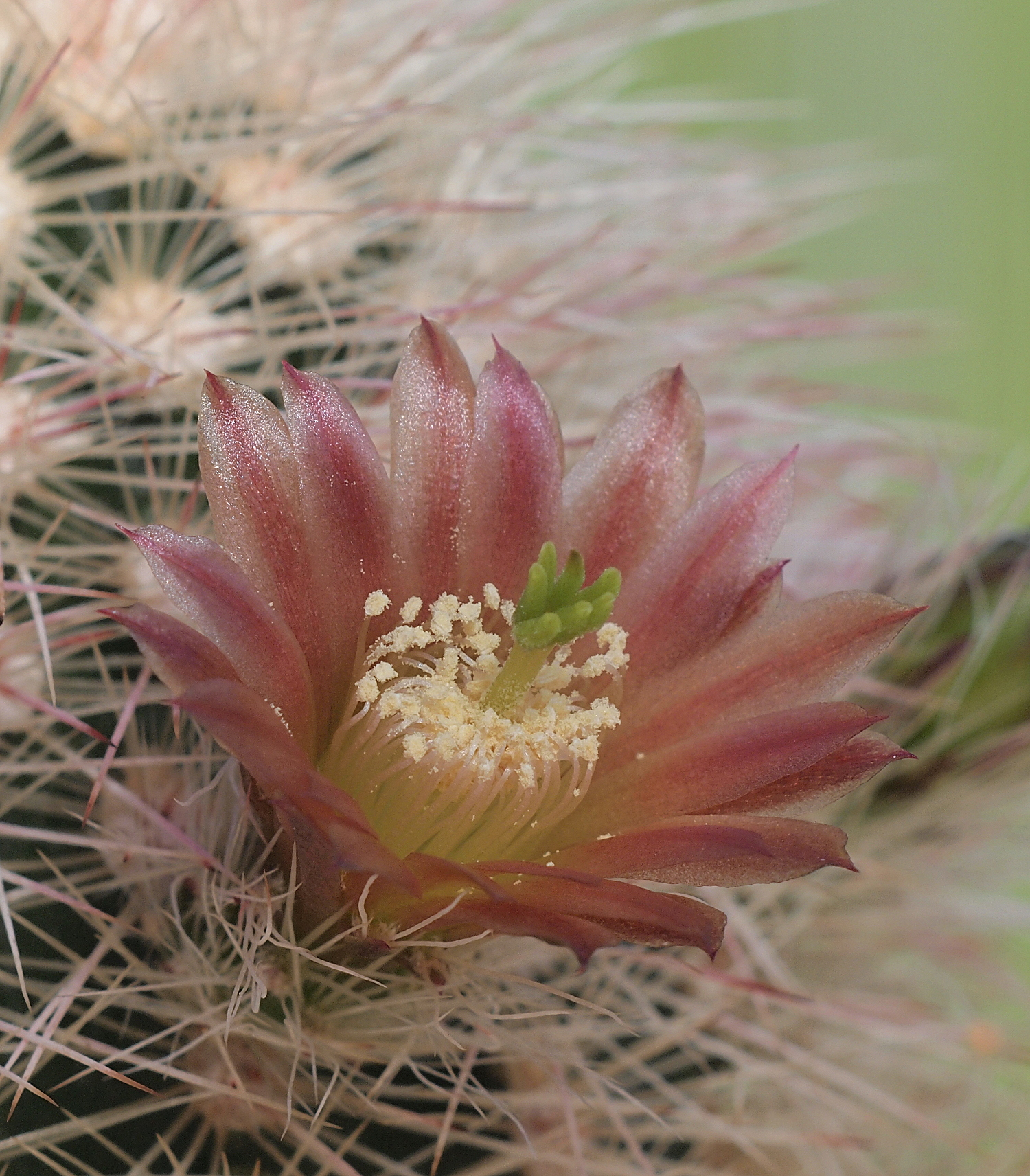
Flowers

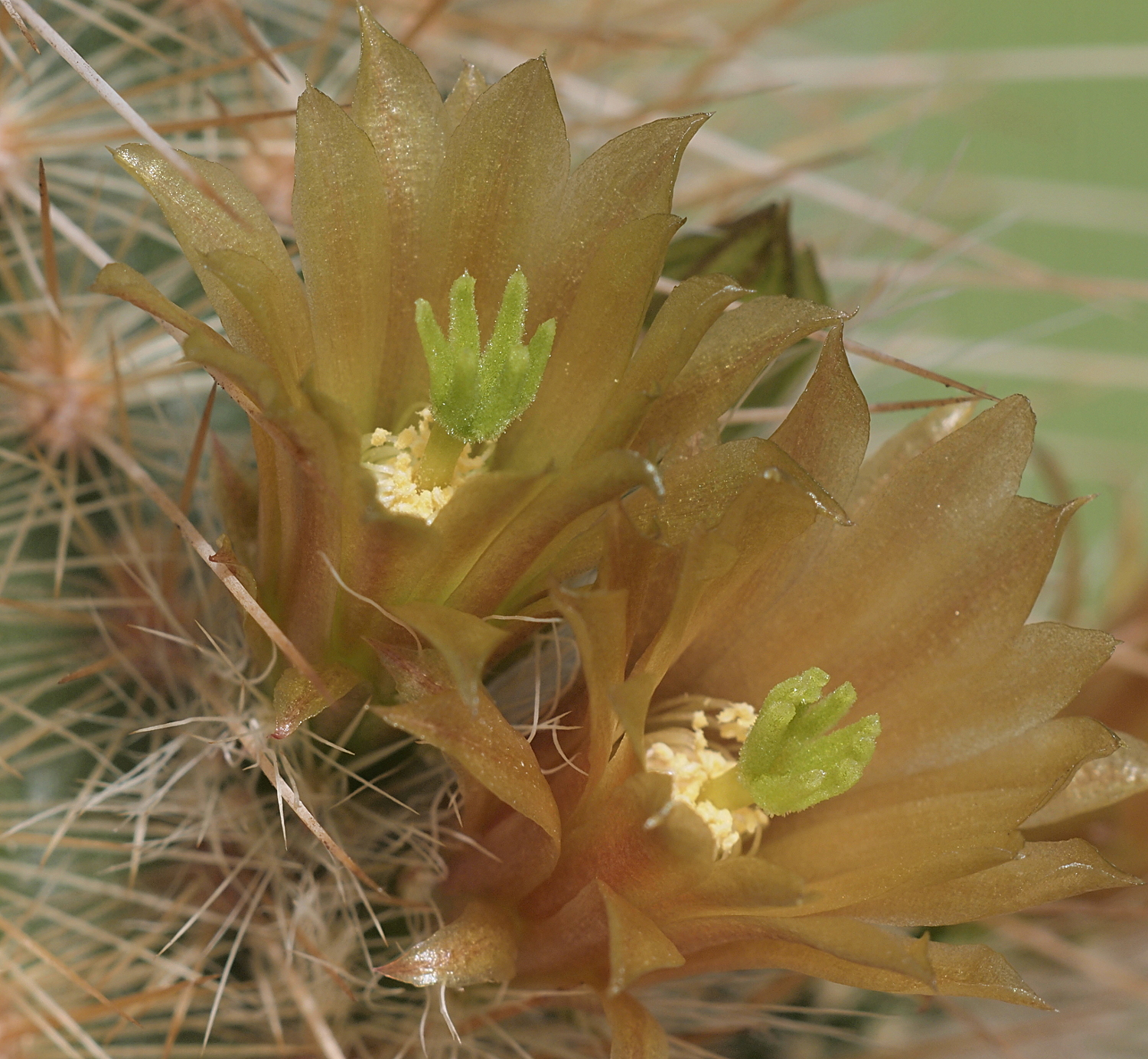
Light yellow flowers

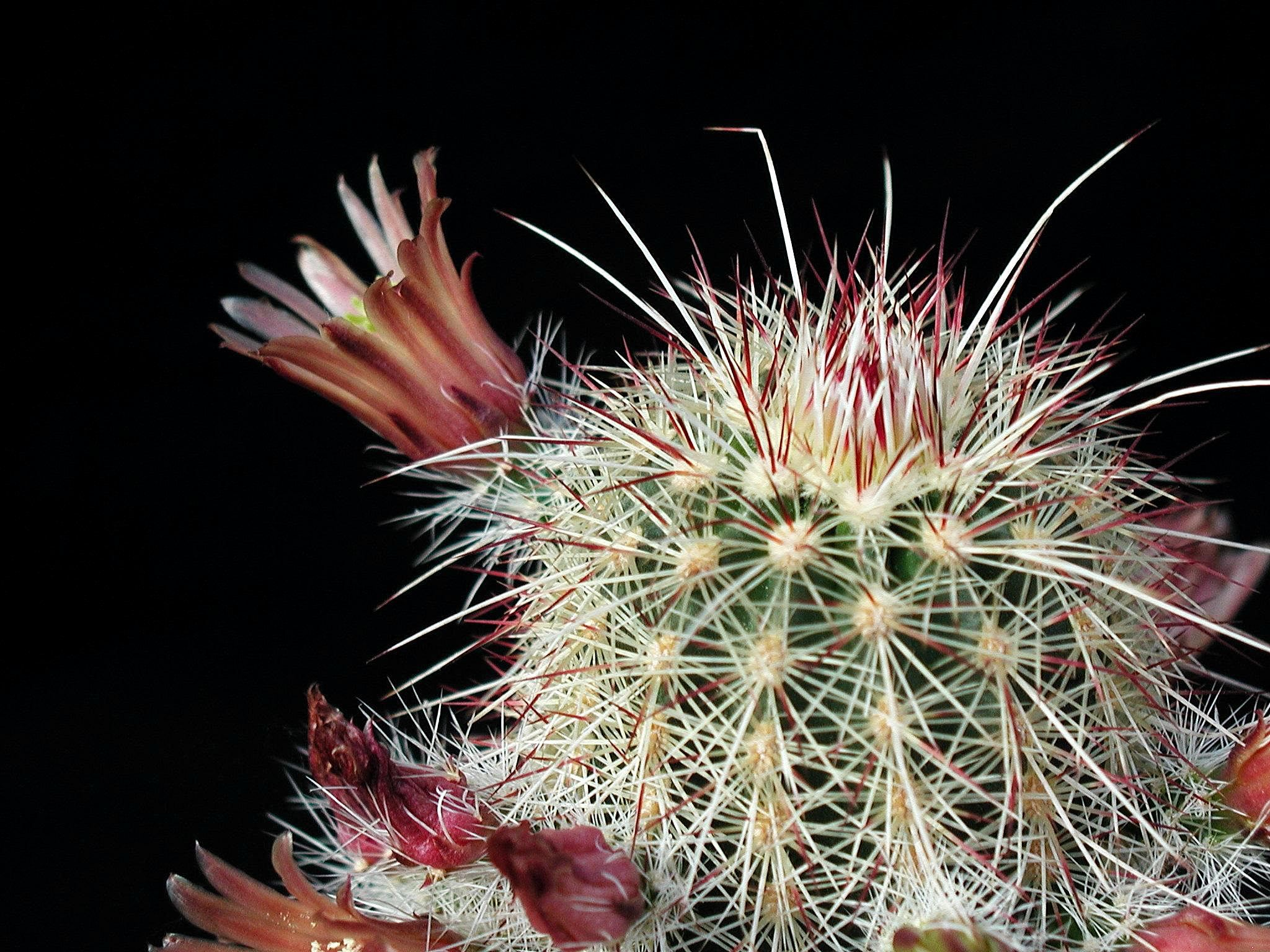
Plant

== Distribution ==
Echinocereus russanthus is native to the Big Bend region of southern Texas, USA, and the neighboring Mexican state of Chihuahua.

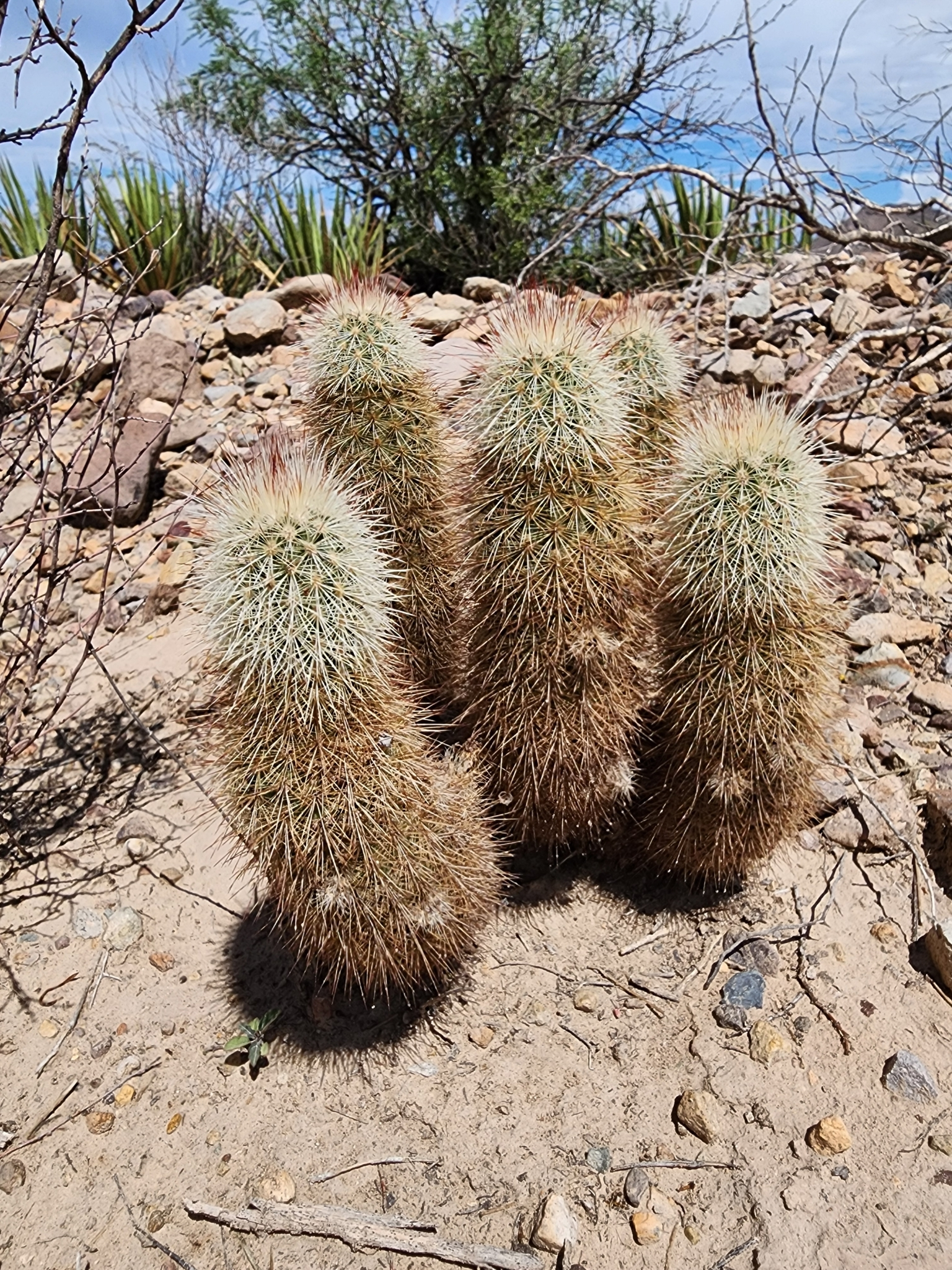
Habitat in Big Bend National Park, Texas

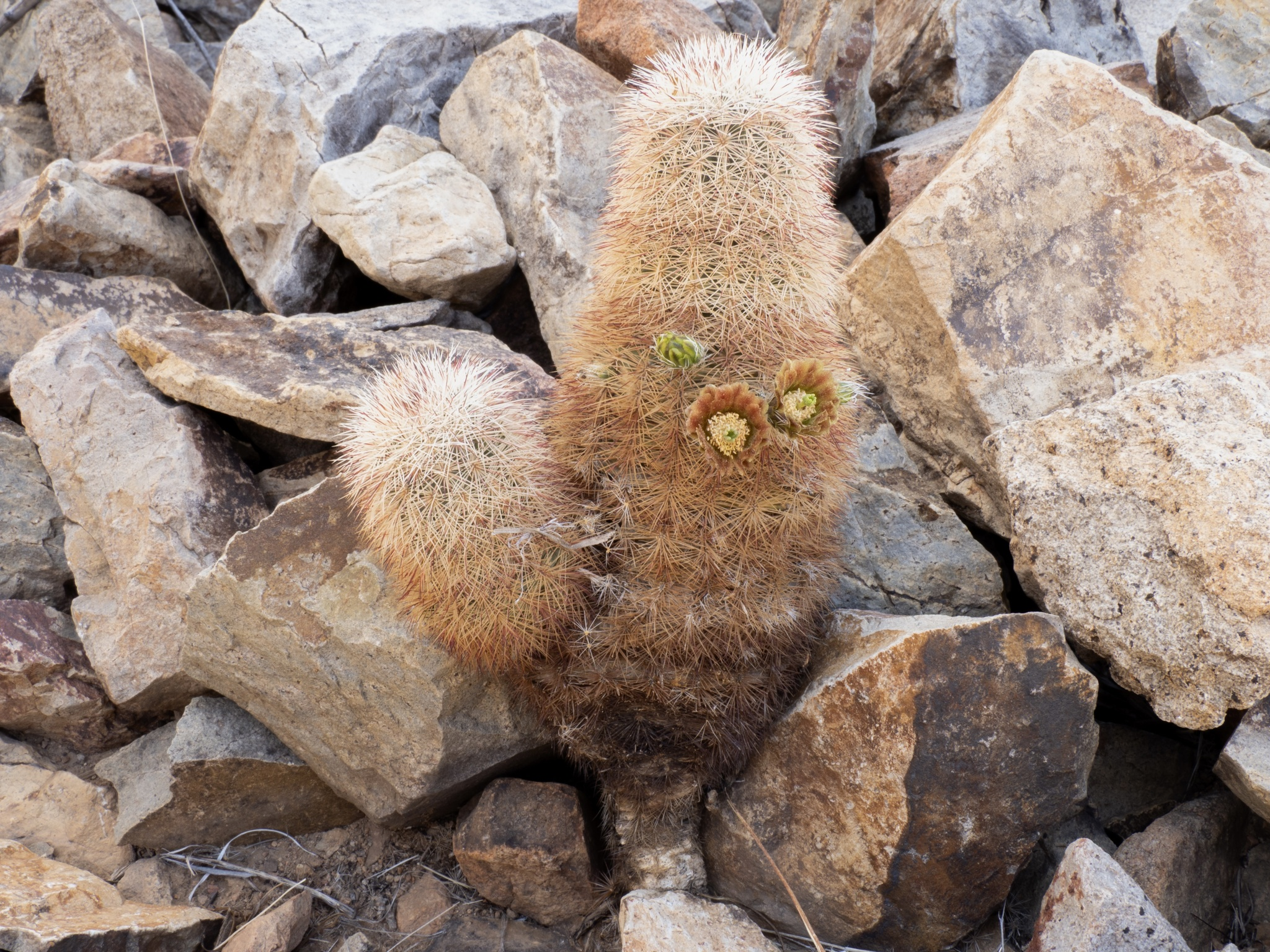
Plant blooming in habitat

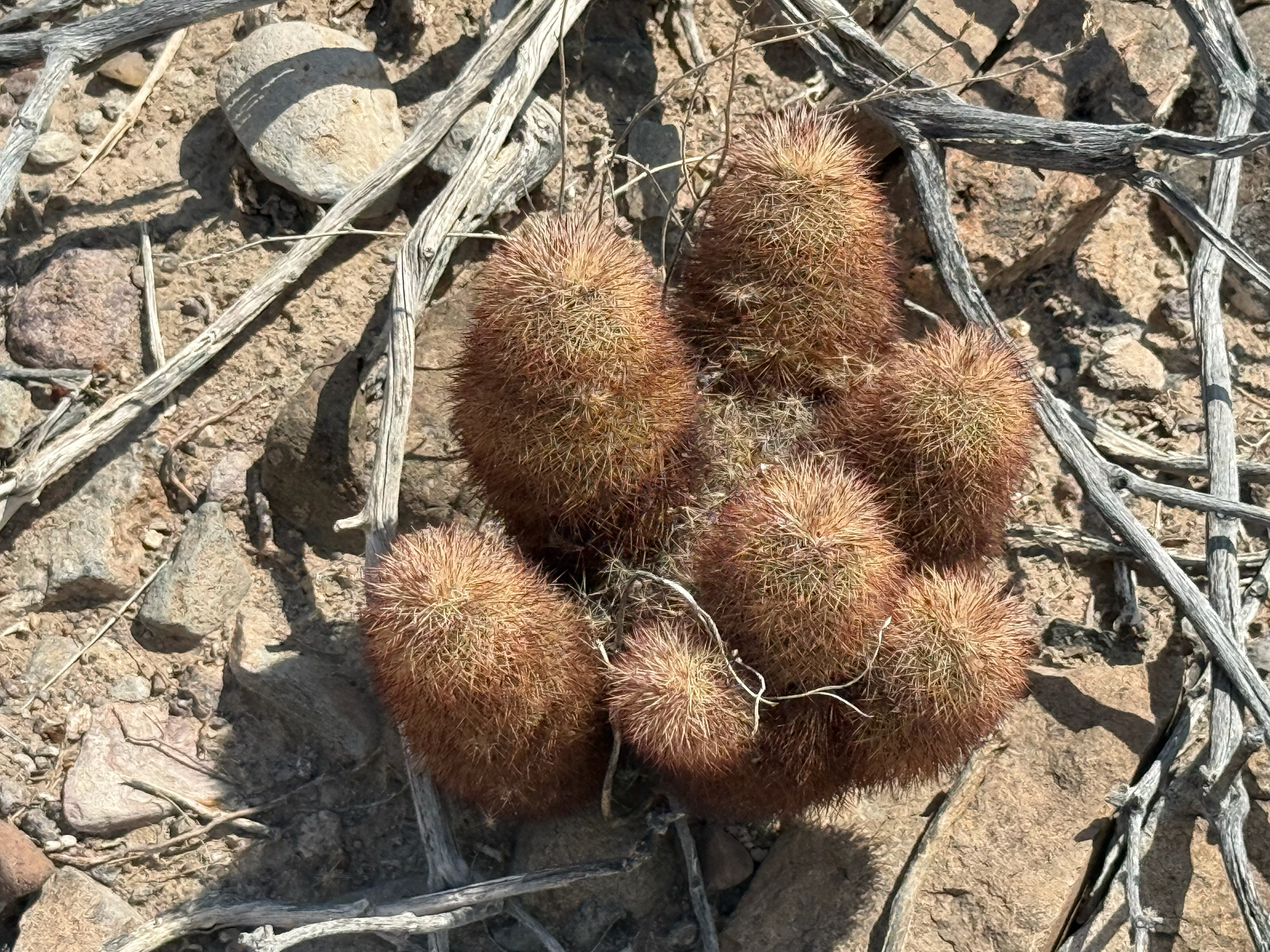
Habitat in Castolon, Texas

== Taxonomy ==
First described by Del Weniger in 1969, the specific epithet "russanthus" comes from the Latin "russus" (reddish) and the Greek "anthos" (flower), referring to the flower's color.
