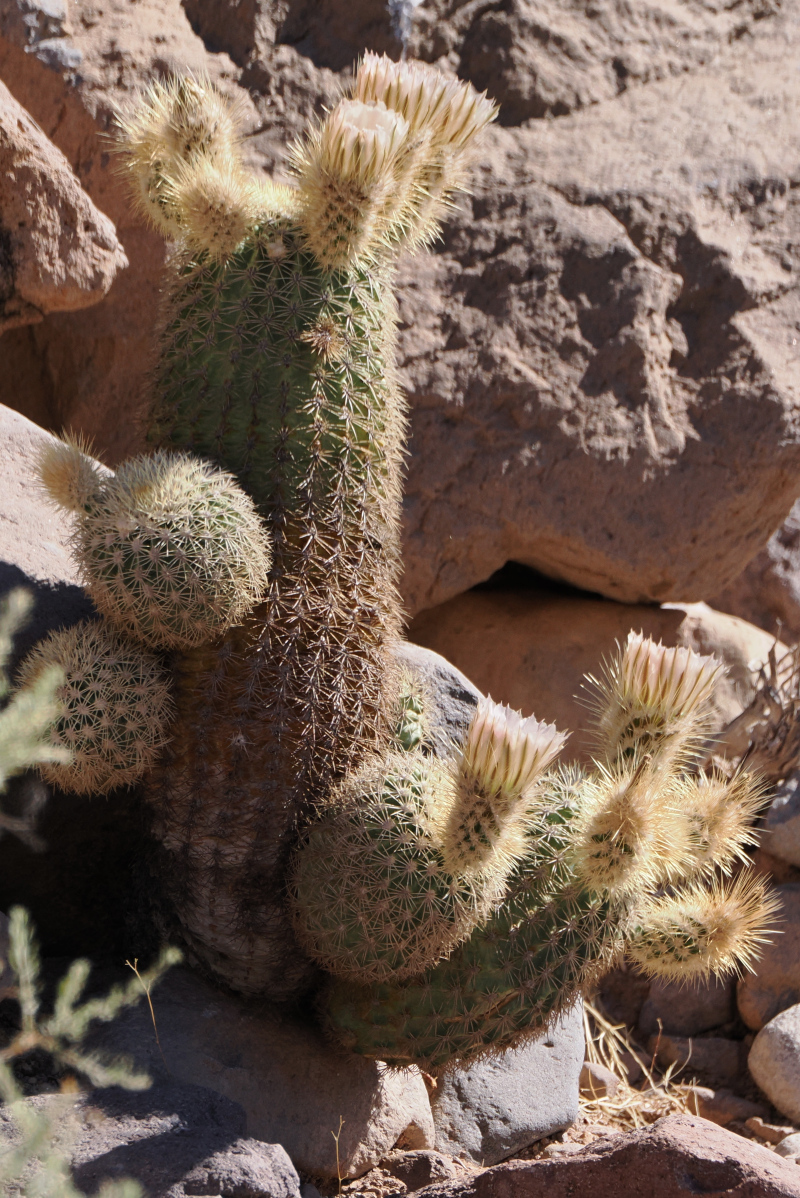

Conservation status
- Least Concern (IUCN 3.1)

Scientific classification
- Kingdom: Plantae
- Clade: Tracheophytes
- Clade: Angiosperms
- Clade: Eudicots
- Order: Caryophyllales
- Family: Cactaceae
- Subfamily: Cactoideae
- Genus: Echinocereus
- Species: E. grandis

Binomial name
- Echinocereus grandis Britton & Rose 1922

= Echinocereus grandis =

Species of cactus

Echinocereus grandis is a species of cactus native to Mexico.

== Description ==
Echinocereus grandis typically grows solitary but can occasionally branch, forming groups of up to 15 shoots. The cylindrical shoots reach up to 50 cm in length and 12 cm in diameter, with 18 to 25 ribs. It has 8 to 12 central spines that are white to cream-colored and 0.3 to 0.6 cm long, along with 15 to 25 radial spines of the same color, measuring 0.5 to 1 cm long. The narrow, funnel-shaped pink to white color flowers are white to light yellow or pink, appearing near the shoot tips. They are 5 to 7 cm long and 5 to 8 cm in diameter.

== Distribution ==
Echinocereus grandis is found on three islands off the Baja California peninsula in the Gulf of California: Islands of San Esteban in Sonora, Las Animas and San Lorenzo growing on dry creek, beaches and low hills.

== Taxonomy ==
Nathaniel Lord Britton and Joseph Nelson Rose first described the species in 1922 from plants collected off of San Esteban Island. The specific epithet "grandis" is Latin for "large," referring to the plant's growth habit.
