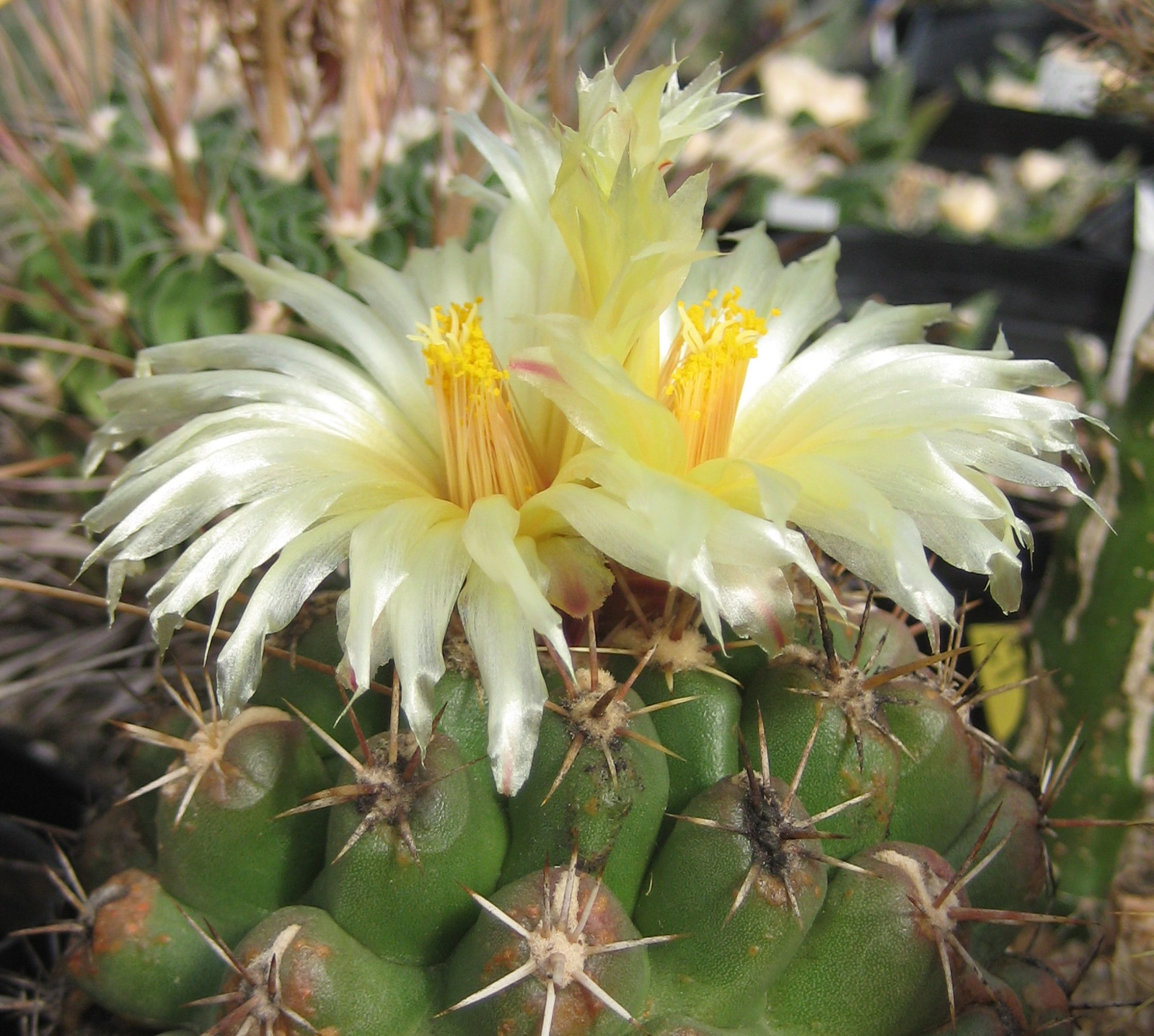

Conservation status
- Least Concern (IUCN 3.1)

Scientific classification
- Kingdom: Plantae
- Clade: Tracheophytes
- Clade: Angiosperms
- Clade: Eudicots
- Order: Caryophyllales
- Family: Cactaceae
- Subfamily: Cactoideae
- Genus: Thelocactus
- Species: T. leucacanthus

Binomial name
- Thelocactus leucacanthus (Zuccarini ex Pfeiffer) Britton & Rose

Synonyms
- List: Echinocactus leucacanthus Zucc. ex Pfeiff. 1837; Echinonyctanthus leucanthus (Zucc. ex Pfeiff.) Lem. 1839; Ferocactus leucacanthus (Zucc. ex Pfeiff.) N.P.Taylor 1979; Cereus maelenii Pfeiff. 1837; Cereus tuberosus Pfeiff. 1837; Echinocactus ehrenbergii Pfeiff. 1838; Echinocactus leucacanthus var. crassior Salm-Dyck 1850; Echinocactus leucacanthus var. tuberosus C.F.Först. 1846; Echinocactus maelenii Salm-Dyck ex C.F.Först. 1846; Echinocactus porrectus Lem. 1838; Echinocactus subporrectus Lem. 1838; Echinocactus tuberosus Salm-Dyck ex C.F.Först. 1846; Echinocactus tuberosus var. subporrectus C.F.Först. 1846; Mammillaria maelenii Salm-Dyck 1845; Thelocactus ehrenbergii (Pfeiff.) F.M.Knuth 1936; Thelocactus leucacanthus var. ehrenbergii (Pfeiff.) Bravo 1980; Thelocactus leucacanthus var. porrectus (Lem.) Backeb. 1961; Thelocactus leucacanthus var. sanchezmejoradae (J.Meyrán) Backeb. 1961; Thelocactus leucacanthus var. schmollii Werderm. 1939; Thelocactus leucacanthus subsp. schmollii (Werderm.) Mosco & Zanov. 1999; Thelocactus porrectus (Lem.) F.M.Knuth 1936; Thelocactus sanchezmejoradae J.Meyrán 1958

= Thelocactus leucacanthus =

Species of cactus

Thelocactus leucacanthus is a species of cactus. It is endemic to Mexico.

== Description ==
Thelocactus leucacanthus grows in clusters or forms large multi-headed cushions up to 80 cm (31 in) wide. The yellowish-green, globular to short cylindrical plants reach 4.5 to 15 cm (1.8 to 5.9 in) in height and 2.5 to 5 cm (0.98 to 1.97 in) in diameter. The plant has 7 to 14 tuberous ribs running vertically or spirally, with conical cusps up to 1.1 cm (0.43 in) high, 1.4 cm (0.55 in) wide, and 0.8 cm (0.31 in) long. The areoles, up to 6 mm (0.24 in) long and 3 mm (0.12 in) wide, have extrafloral nectaries. Occasionally, a single central spine, yellowish-white to nearly black, grows up to 5 cm (2.0 in) long, with 6 to 20 radial spines that are 7 mm (0.28 in) long and straight or slightly curved. The yellow, purple, or crimson flowers reach up to 5.2 cm (2.0 in) long and 4.5 cm (1.8 in) in diameter. The green to yellowish fruits grow up to 9 mm (0.35 in) long and 8 mm (0.31 in) wide, drying and cracking at the base when ripe. They contain seeds up to 2 mm (0.079 in) long and 1.8 mm (0.071 in) wide, with polygonal or square testa cells.

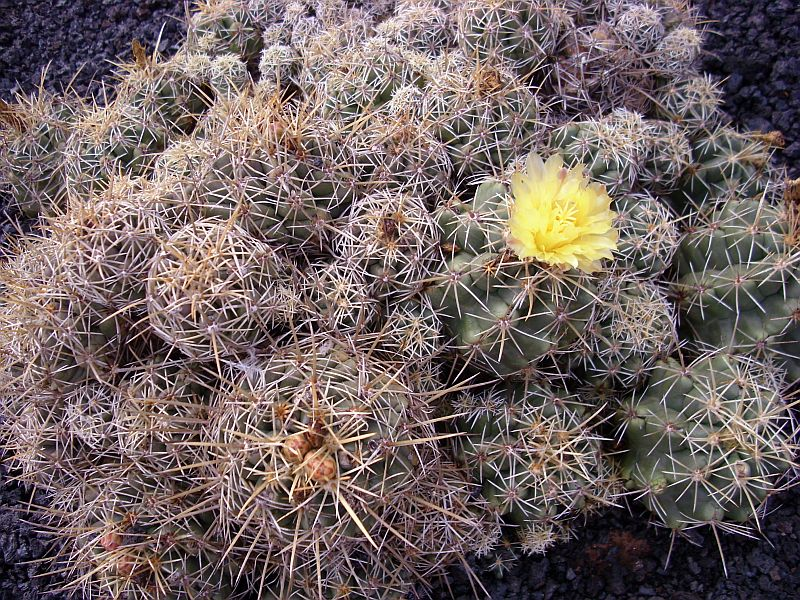
Plant with bloom

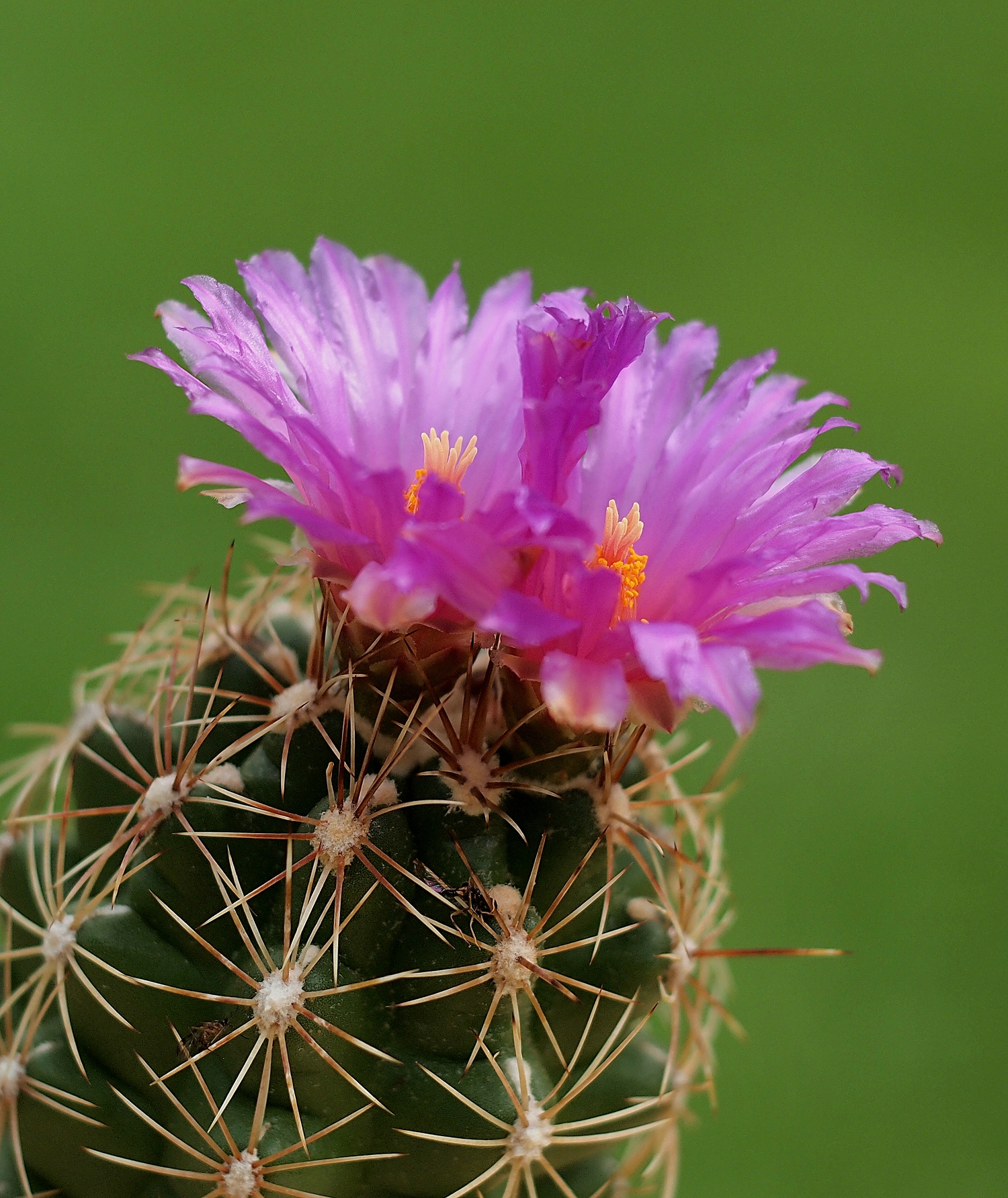
Purple flower form

== Distribution ==
This species grows at elevations of 1200 to 1900 meters in the succulent bush forests of Hidalgo and Querétaro, Mexico. Plants are found growing along with Thelocactus hastifer.

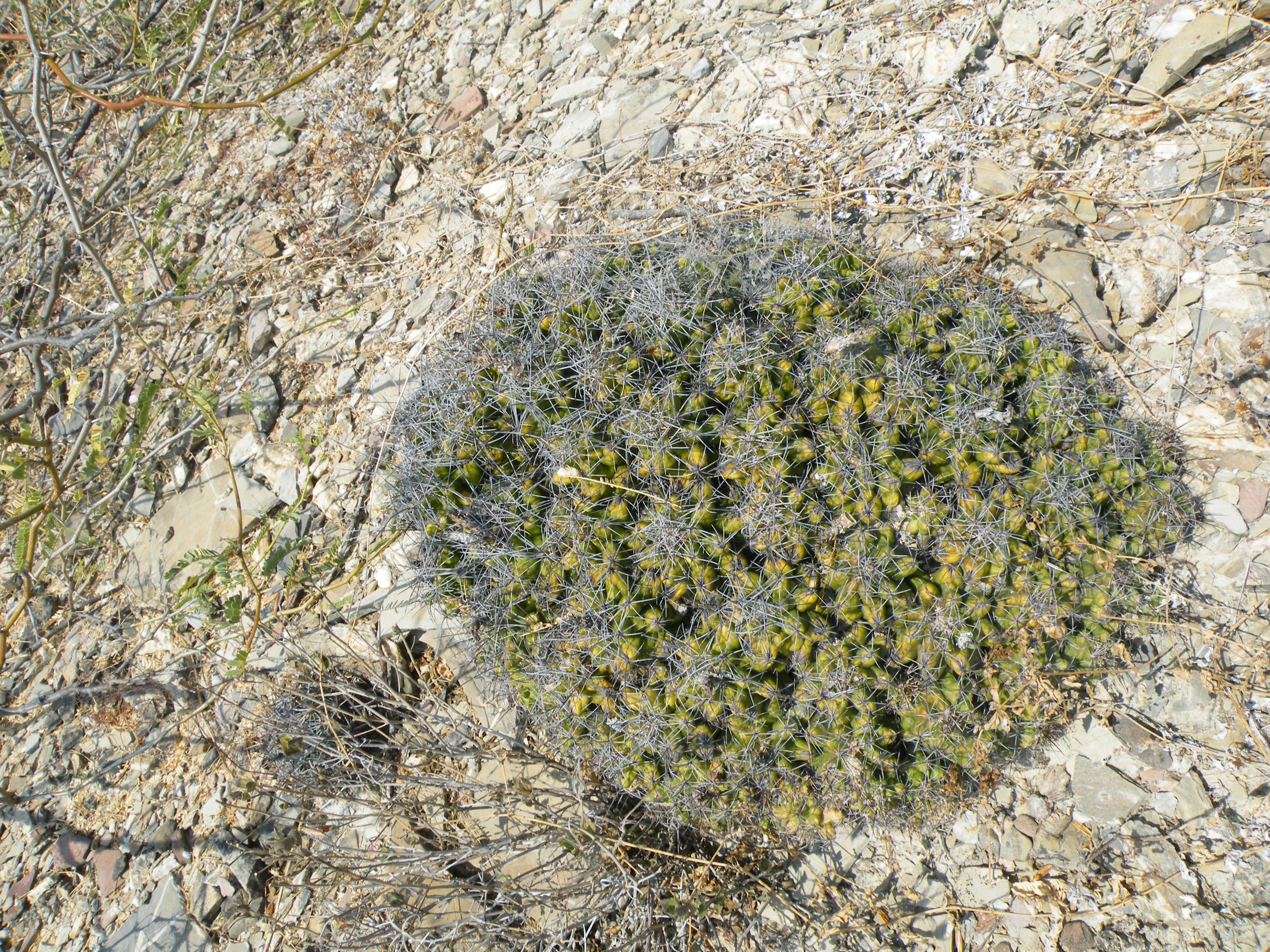
Habitat in Pena Blanca, Querétaro

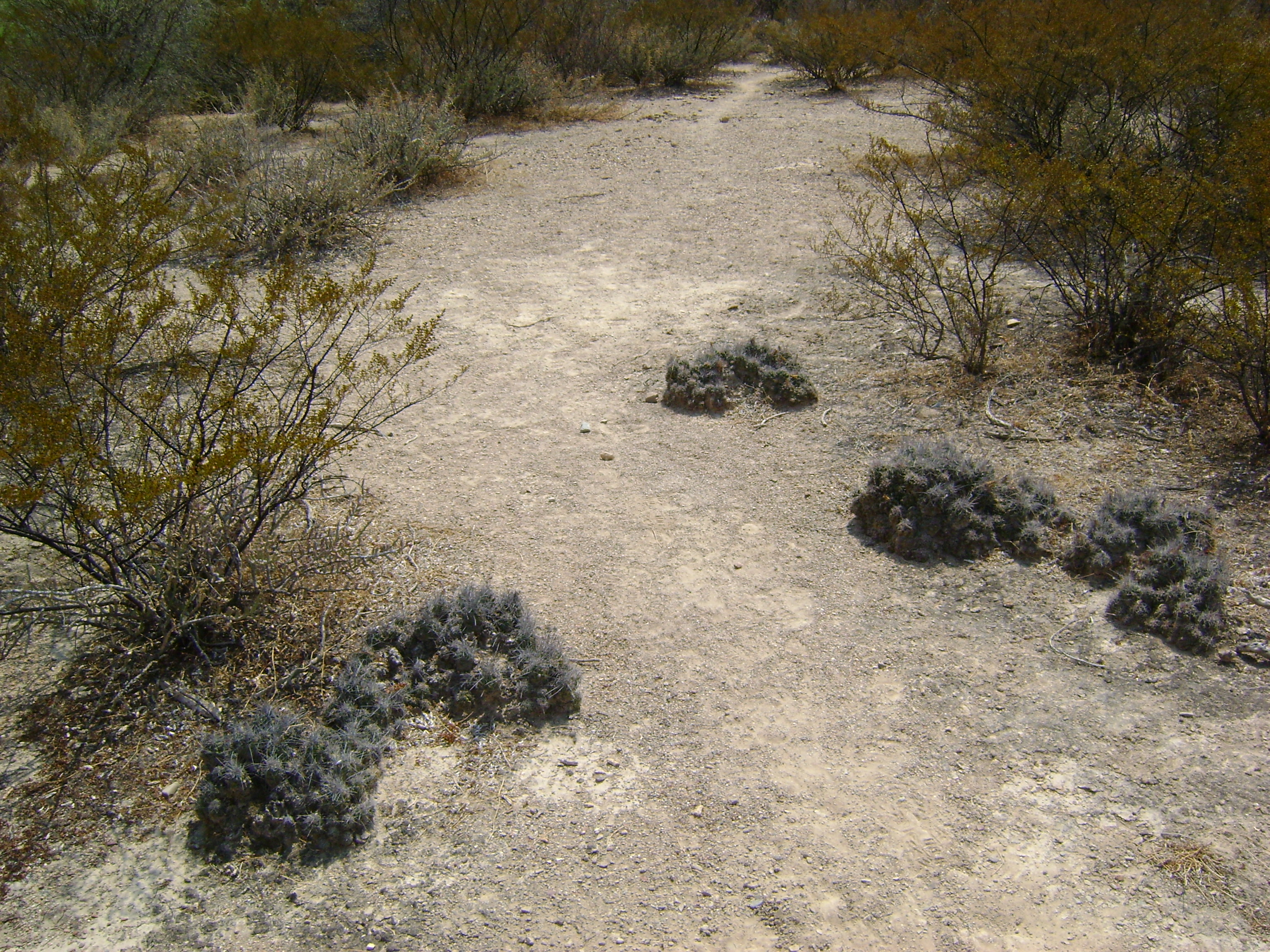

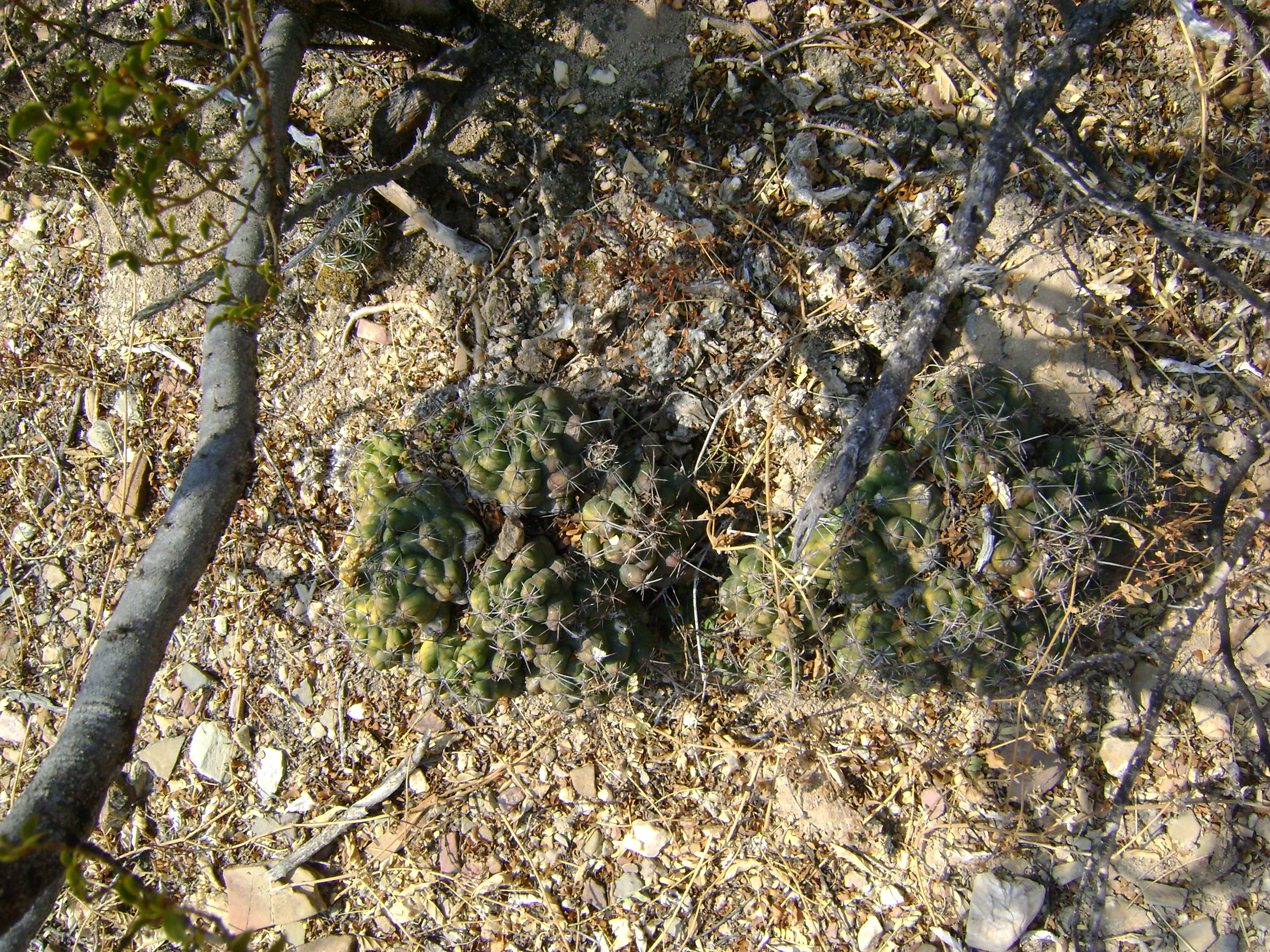

== Taxonomy ==
First described as Echinocactus leucacanthus by Ludwig Karl Georg Pfeiffer in 1837, it was reclassified as Thelocactus leucacanthus by Nathaniel Lord Britton and Joseph Nelson Rose in 1923. Its name is derived from the Greek words leukos ("white") and akanthos ("thorn").
