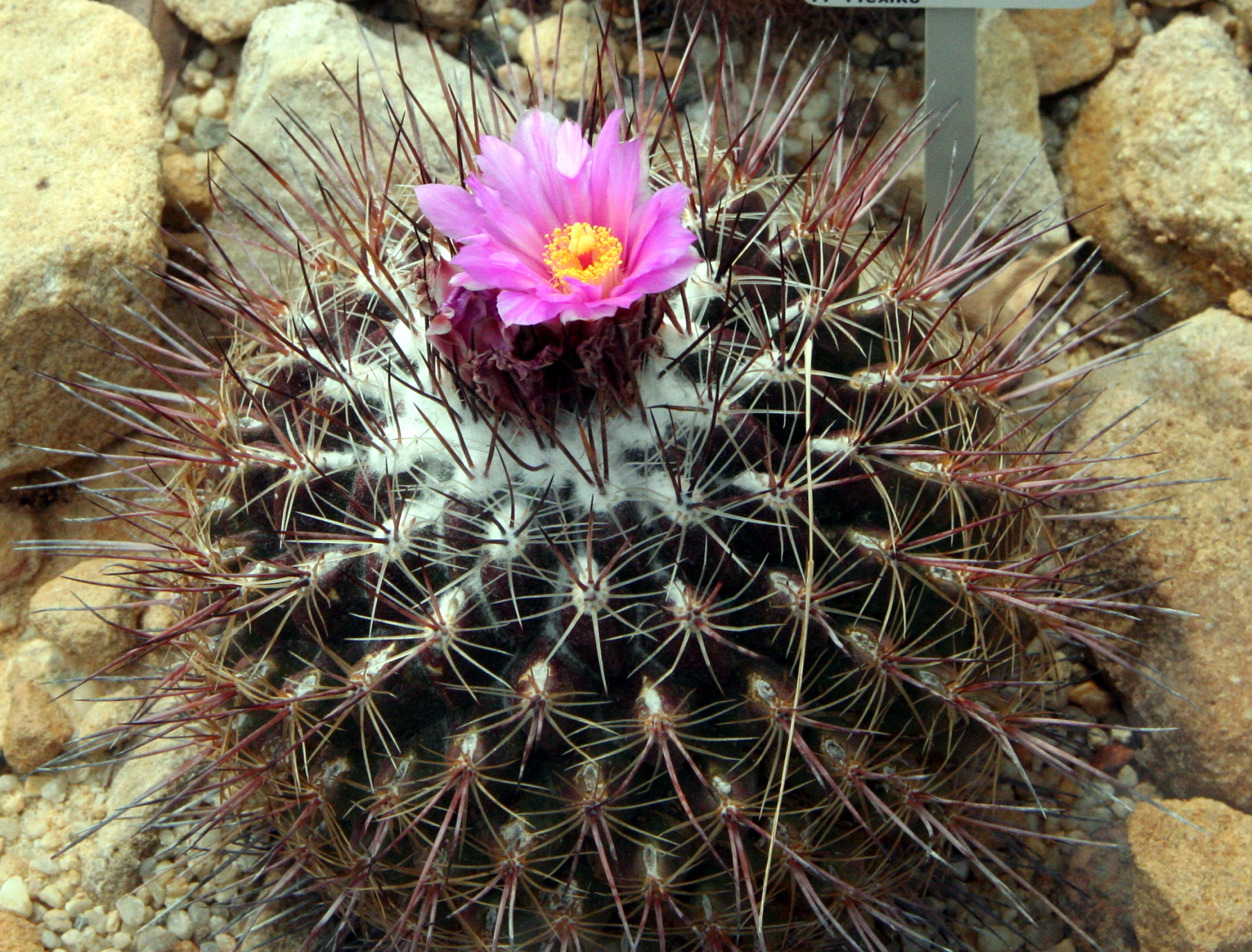

Scientific classification
- Kingdom: Plantae
- Clade: Tracheophytes
- Clade: Angiosperms
- Clade: Eudicots
- Order: Caryophyllales
- Family: Cactaceae
- Subfamily: Cactoideae
- Genus: Thelocactus
- Species: T. conothelos

Binomial name
- Thelocactus conothelos (Regel & Klein) Backeb. & F.M.Knuth

Synonyms
- Echinocactus conothelos Regel & E.Klein bis 1860; Gymnocactus conothelos (Regel & E.Klein bis) Backeb. 1961; Torreycactus conothelos (Regel & E.Klein bis) Doweld 1998

= Thelocactus conothelos =

Species of cactus

Thelocactus conothelos is a species of cactus endemic to Mexico.

== Description ==
Thelocactus conothelos is a solitary, spherical cactus, growing 7 to 18 cm (2.8 to 7.1 in) in height and diameter. Its ribs are indistinct, with conical warts that are light green at the base and squared. The areoles are woolly and about 3 mm (0.12 in) wide. It has 7 to 20 glassy, ocher yellow to grayish radial spines, 8 to 12 mm (0.31 to 0.47 in) long, and 4 central spines that are 1 to 9 cm (0.39 to 3.54 in) long. The large, spreading flowers range from 4.5 to 6 cm (1.8 to 2.4 in) wide and vary in color from white to magenta. Fruits are 12 mm (0.47 in) long and 7 mm (0.28 in) in diameter, with dark reddish to black seeds.

=== Subspecies ===
Accepted subspecies:

Image	Scientific name	Distribution
	Thelocactus conothelos subsp. argenteus (Glass & R.A.Foster) Glass	Mexico (Nuevo León)
	Thelocactus conothelos subsp. aurantiacus (Glass & R.A.Foster) Glass	NE. Mexico
	Thelocactus conothelos subsp. conothelos	NE. Mexico
	Thelocactus conothelos subsp. garciae (Glass & Mend.-Garc.) Mosco & Zanov.	Mexico (Tamaulipas)

== Distribution ==
This species is native to Tamaulipas, Nuevo León, and San Luis Potosí, Mexico at elevations between 1200 and 2200 meters growing in shrubland and limestone slopes. Plants are found growing along Mammillaria candida, Mammillaria picta, Mammillaria formosa subsp. formosa, Mammillaria winterae, Turbinicarpus schmiedickeanus subsp. gracilis, Thelocactus bicolor, Astrophytum myriostigma and Echinocactus platyacanthus

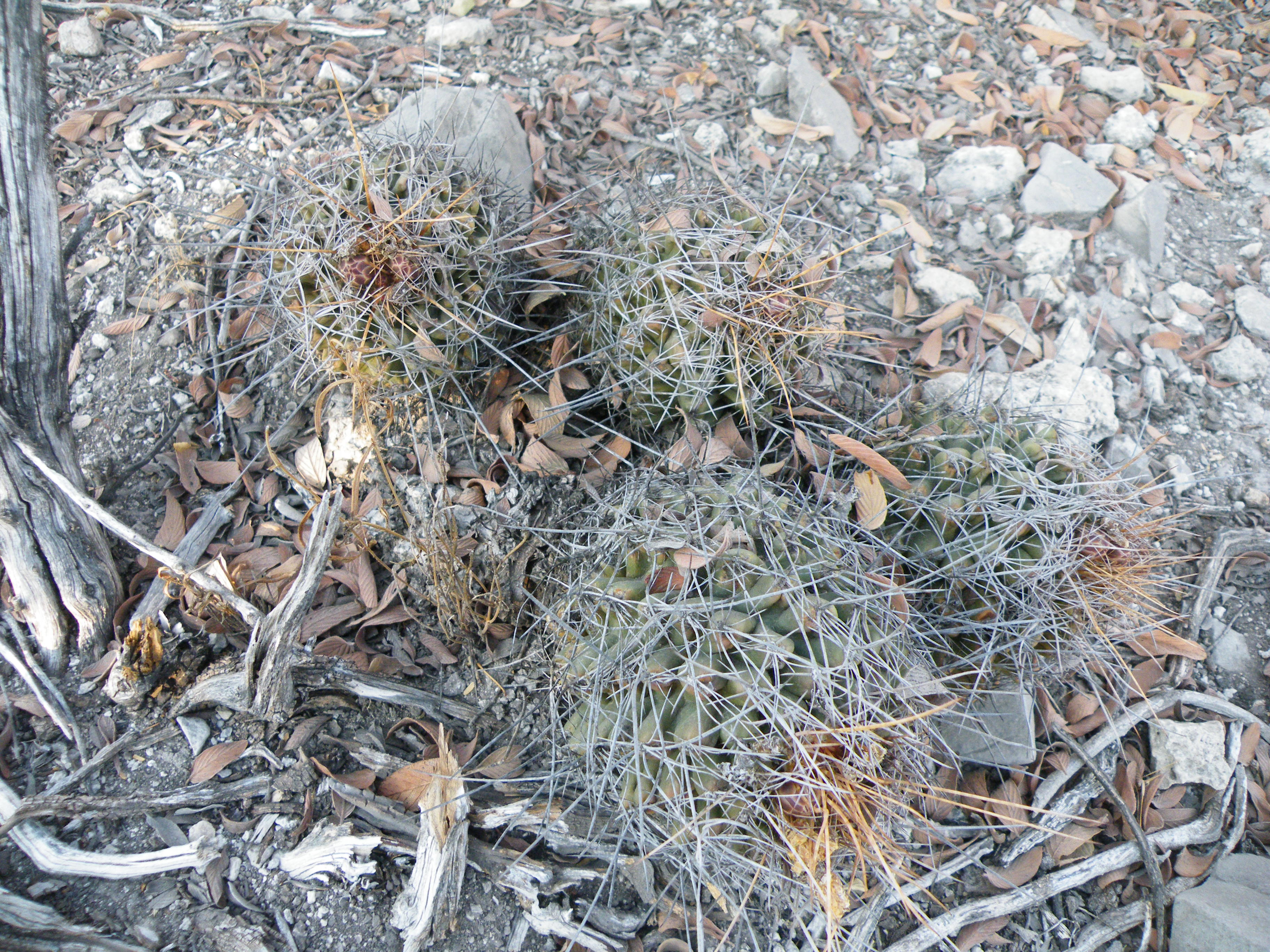
Thelocactus conothelos subsp. aurantiacus near Presa De Guadalupe

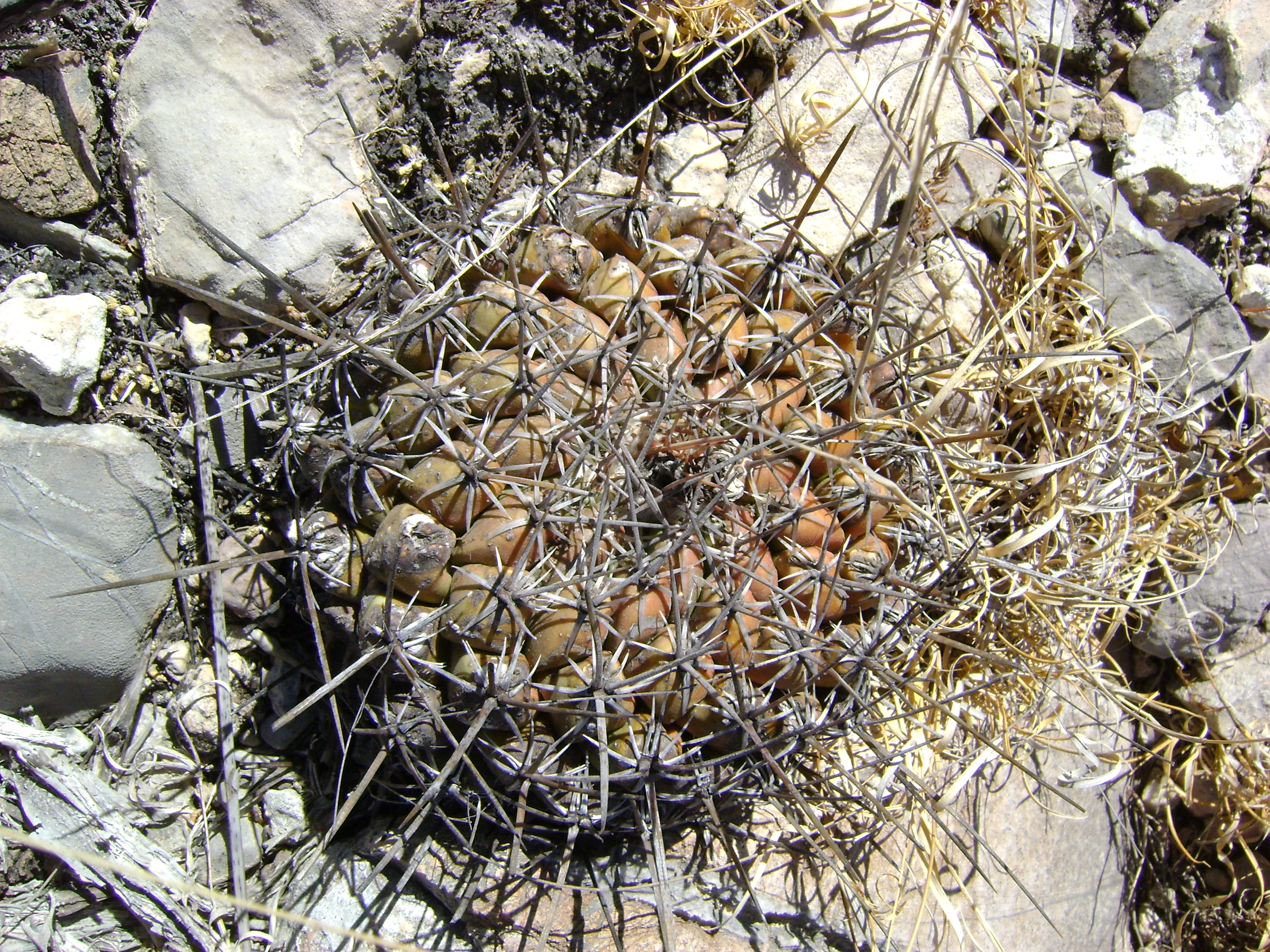
Plant growing in Nuevo León

== Taxonomy ==
It was first described as Echinocactus conothelos in 1860 by Eduard von Regel and Edward Klein. The name, derived from Greek, refers to the cone-shaped warts. In 1936, Frederik Marcus Knuth reclassified it as Thelocactus.
