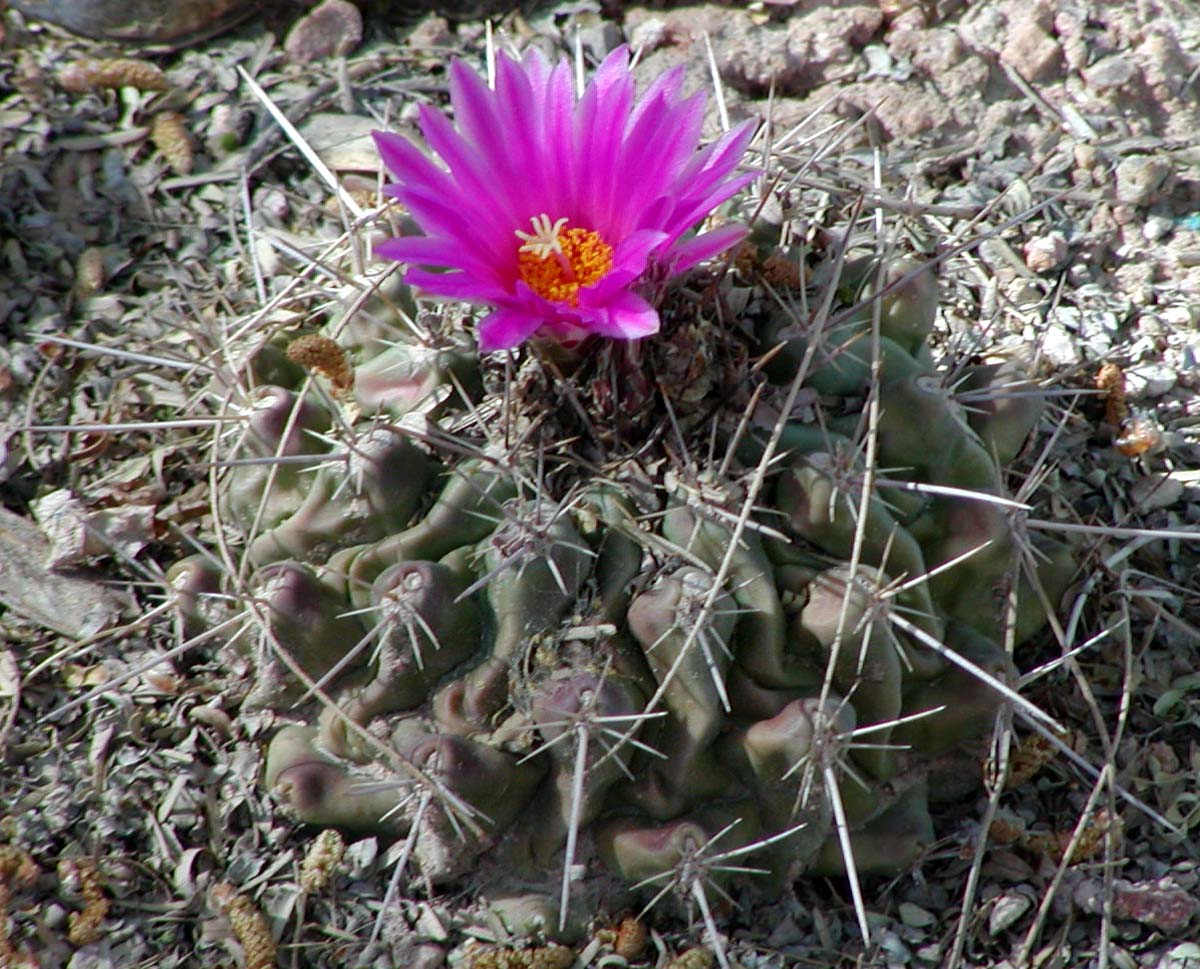
- Thelocactus rinconensis

Scientific classification
- Kingdom: Plantae
- Clade: Tracheophytes
- Clade: Angiosperms
- Clade: Eudicots
- Order: Caryophyllales
- Family: Cactaceae
- Subfamily: Cactoideae
- Tribe: Cacteae
- Genus: Thelocactus (K.Schum.) Britton & Rose

Type species
- Thelocactus hexaedrophorus

Species
- See text

Synonyms
- Hamatocactus Britton & Rose; Thelomastus Fric

= Thelocactus =

Genus of cacti

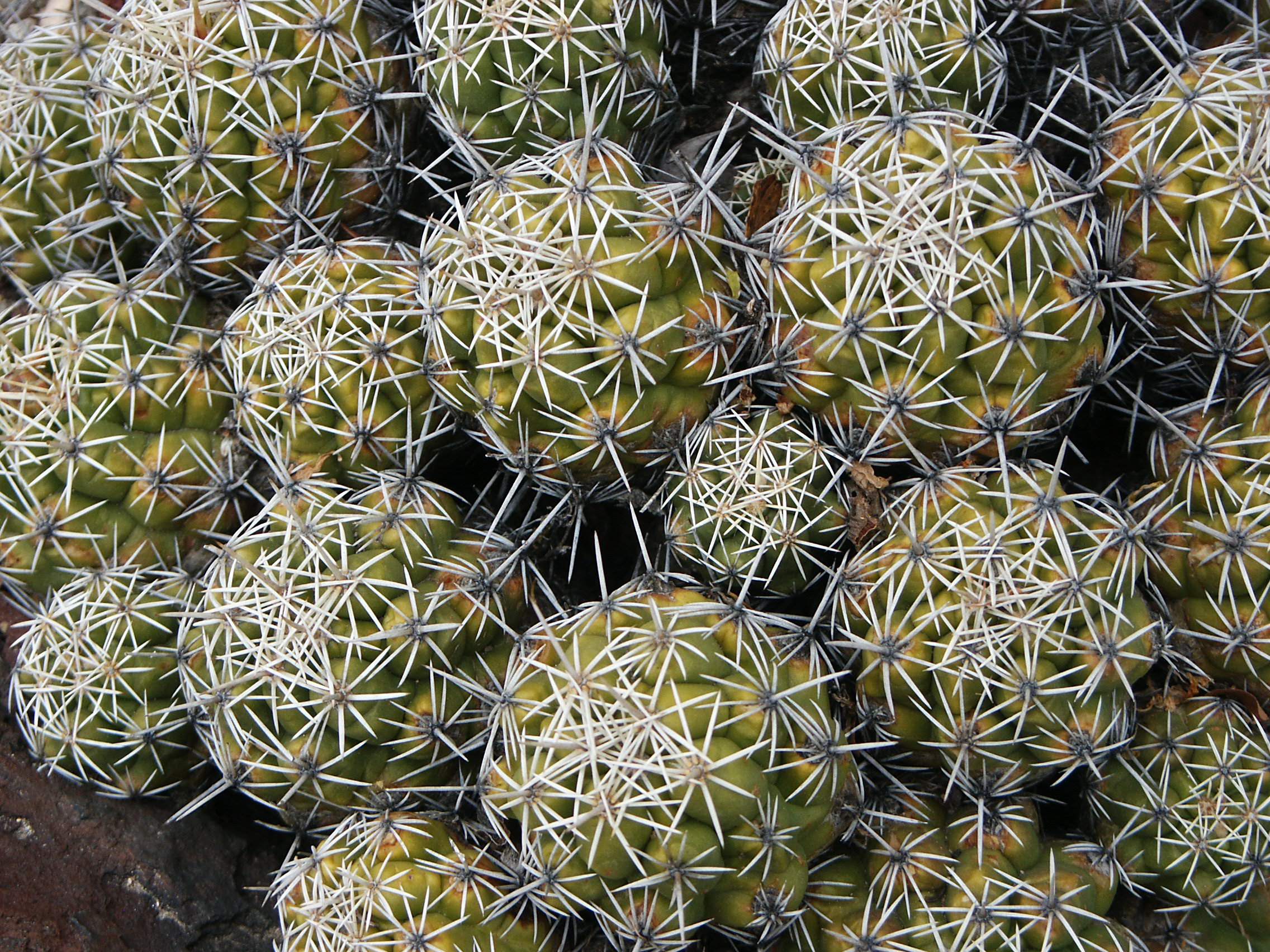
Thelocactus leucacanthus

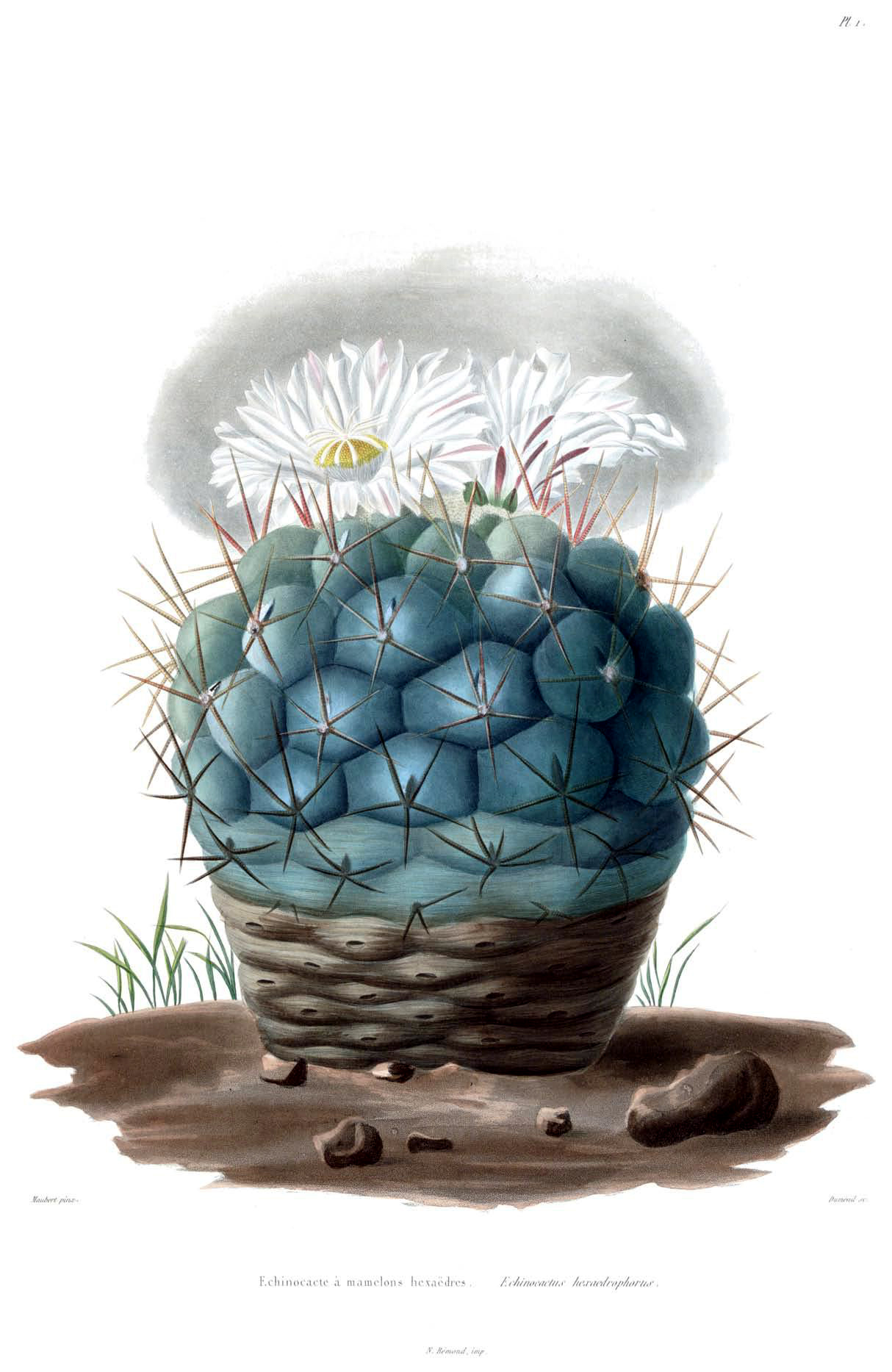
Thelocactus hexaedrophorus, by Charles Antoine Lemaire, circa 1845.

Time-lapse video of Thelocactus bicolor blooming in response to sunlight.

Thelocactus is a genus of flowering plants in the cactus family Cactaceae. Members of the genus are native to the arid lands of Central and Northern Mexico.

== Description ==
Thelocactus species are globe-shaped, short and cylindrical. They are small cacti, although there are one or two species which, while only about 15 cm high, can be 25 cm in diameter; for example, T. nidulans. Thelocactus species are generally solitary, but some varieties will cluster in groups.

The ribs on Thelocactus species are very clearly marked and are sometimes twisted in a spiral. There can be from 8 to 20 ribs, which are rather low and normally marked with raised, angular or hexagonal tubercles. These tubercles can sometimes be difficult to distinguish. Areoles sit in a furrow directly above where the spines grow and there can be up to twenty radial/radiating spines. They are often needle-like, spread out and can be from 1.3 – 1.5 cm long. The central spines are mostly coarser, number up to six, stand vertically out from the plant and can be 2.5 – 7.5 cm long. Colours of all of the spines vary and include white, gray, golden-yellow and red-brown.

Flowers grow from the new areoles at the very top of the plant. They are funnel-shaped, have a diameter of 2.5 – 7.5 cm and their colours vary from white to shades of yellow, red or purple. They are diurnal. Fruits are small, globe-shaped and plain. They are dehiscent through the large basal pore, green to brownish purple [to magenta], spherical to short cylindrical, 5 - 18 x 6 – 17 mm, not juicy, drying immediately after ripening, scaly, spineless, hairless and with floral remnant persistent.

== Distribution ==
Thelocactus species grow in the wild in central and North Mexico and in the US in Texas. In Mexico, the species are generally concentrated along and to the west of the Sierra Madre Oriental beginning with T. hastifer in Querétaro State, about 150 km NNW of Mexico City. One subspecies (T. bicolor ssp. flavidispinus) grows on the other (northern) side of the Rio Grande, well distributed in the Big Bend area of Texas. Other occurrences of T. bicolor in Texas have been reported but cited verification is sketchy although it would be odd if they did not occur there. Some species are distributed over a wide area of many Mexican states (T. bicolor and its subspecies and T. hexaedrophorus) with T. bicolor and its current (2013) botanically accepted subspecies bolaensis, flavidispinus, heterochromus and schwarzii having the widest distribution. In contrast, one species, T. lausseri, only occurs in one known remote locality in central Coahuila state. Species are distributed in mountainous stony/rocky places or grassy territory with clay soil.

== Cultivation ==
Thelocactus species are generally easy to cultivate, even if many species fail to flower until they are five years old. Soils should be composed of equal proportions of sand and humus. Water normally from Spring to Autumn. In Winter, keep most species at a minimum temperature of 8 °C. They can survive at lower temperatures but the roots then must be kept dry. The dark brown or black seeds can be relatively large for the size of cactus and they germinate readily.

Reproduction is nearly always from seed, since the plant rarely produces plantlets. The seed should be put in a sand and compost mixture, kept moist, maintained at a temperature of 21 °C and placed in a shady position.

Thelocactus bicolor has gained the Royal Horticultural Society's Award of Garden Merit.

== Synonymy ==
The following genera have been brought to synonymy with Thelocactus:

- Hamatocactus Britton & Rose

This genus contained 8 species and was known from the Southwest United States and in northern Mexico. The name Hamatocactus means "hooked cactus" in Latin.

- Thelomastus Fric (nom. inval.)

== Species ==
Species recognized by Plants of the World Online As of September 2024:

Image	Scientific name	Sub-species	Distribution
	Thelocactus bicolor (Galeotti ex Pfeiffer) Britton & Rose	Thelocactus bicolor subsp. bicolor; Thelocactus bicolor subsp. bolaensis (Runge) Doweld; Thelocactus bicolor subsp. flavidispinus (Backeb.) N.P.Taylor; Thelocactus bicolor subsp. heterochromus (F.A.C.Weber) Mosco & Zanov.; Thelocactus bicolor subsp. schwarzii (Backeb.) N.P.Taylor	northern Chihuahuan Desert of the USA (Texas) and Mexico.
	Thelocactus buekii (E.Klein bis) Britton & Rose		Mexico (Nuevo León)
	Thelocactus conothelos (Regel & Klein) Backeb. & F.M.Knuth	Thelocactus conothelos subsp. argenteus (Glass & R.Foster) Glass; Thelocactus conothelos subsp. aurantiacus (Glass & R.Foster) Glass (syn.Thelocactus conothelos subsp. flavus)	Mexico (Chihuahua, Coahuila de Zaragoza, Durango, Nuevo León, Tamaulipas)
	Thelocactus hastifer (Werdermann & Boedeker) F.M.Knuth		Mexico (Querétaro de Arteaga)
	Thelocactus hexaedrophorus (Lemaire) Britton & Rose		Mexico (Nuevo León, San Luis Potosí, Tamaulipas, Zacatecas)
	Thelocactus lausseri Riha & Busek		Mexico ( Coahuila de Zaragoza )
	Thelocactus leucacanthus (Zuccarini) Britton & Rose		Mexico (Hidalgo, Querétaro de Arteaga)
	Thelocactus macdowellii (Rebut ex Quehl) Glass		Mexico (Coahuila de Zaragoza, Nuevo León)
	Thelocactus multicephalus Halda & Panar.		Mexico (Nuevo León)
	Thelocactus rinconensis (Poselger) Britton & Rose		Mexico (Coahuila de Zaragoza, Nuevo León)
	Thelocactus setispinus (Engelmann) E.F.Anderson		Mexico (Coahuila de Zaragoza, Nuevo León, Tamaulipas), USA (Texas)
	Thelocactus tepelmemensis T.J.Davis, H.M.Hern., G.D.Starr & Gómez-Hin.		Mexico (NW. Oaxaca)
	Thelocactus tulensis (Poselger) Britton & Rose		Mexico(Nuevo León, San Luis Potosí, Tamaulipas )

=== Formerly placed here ===
- Turbinicarpus beguinii (N.P.Taylor) Mosco & Zanov. (as T. beguinii N.P.Taylor)
- Turbinicarpus gielsdorfianus (Werderm.) V.John & Ríha (as T. gielsdorfianus (Werderm.) Borg)
- Turbinicarpus horripilus (Lem.) V.John & Ríha (as T. horripilus (Lem.) Kladiwa)
- Turbinicarpus knuthianus (Boed.) V.John & Ríha (as T. knuthianus (Boed.) Borg)
- Turbinicarpus lophophoroides (Werderm.) Buxb. & Backeb. (as T. lophophoroides Werderm.)
- Turbinicarpus mandragora (Fric ex A.Berger) A.D.Zimm. (as T. mandragora A.Berger)
- Turbinicarpus pseudopectinatus (Backeb.) Glass & R.A.Foster (as T. pseudopectinatus (Backeb.) E.F.Anderson & Boke)
- Turbinicarpus saueri (Boed.) V.John & Ríha (as T. saueri (Boed.) Borg)
- Turbinicarpus subterraneus (Backeb.) A.D.Zimm. (as T. subterraneus (Backeb.) Backeb. & F.M.Knuth)
- Turbinicarpus viereckii (Werderm.) V.John & Ríha (as T. viereckii (Werderm.) Bravo)
- Turbinicarpus ysabelae (Schlange) V.John & Ríha (as T. ysabelae Schlange)

== Literature ==
- Edward F. Anderson: A revision of the genus Thelocactus B. & R. (Cactaceae). In: Bradleya. Band 5, 1987, S. 49–76.
- Grzegorz F. Matuszewski, Stanisław Hinz: Thelocactus. Systematik, Vorkommen und Kultur. 2011, ISBN 978-83-932646-0-5.
- Alessandro Mosco, Carlo Zanovello: A phenetic analysis of the genus Thelocactus. In: Bradleya, Band 18, 2000, S. 45–70, PDF.
- Alessandro Mosco, Carlo Zanovello: An introduction to the genus Thelocactus. In: Cactus & Co. Band 6, Nummer 3, 2002, S. 144–171, PDF.
