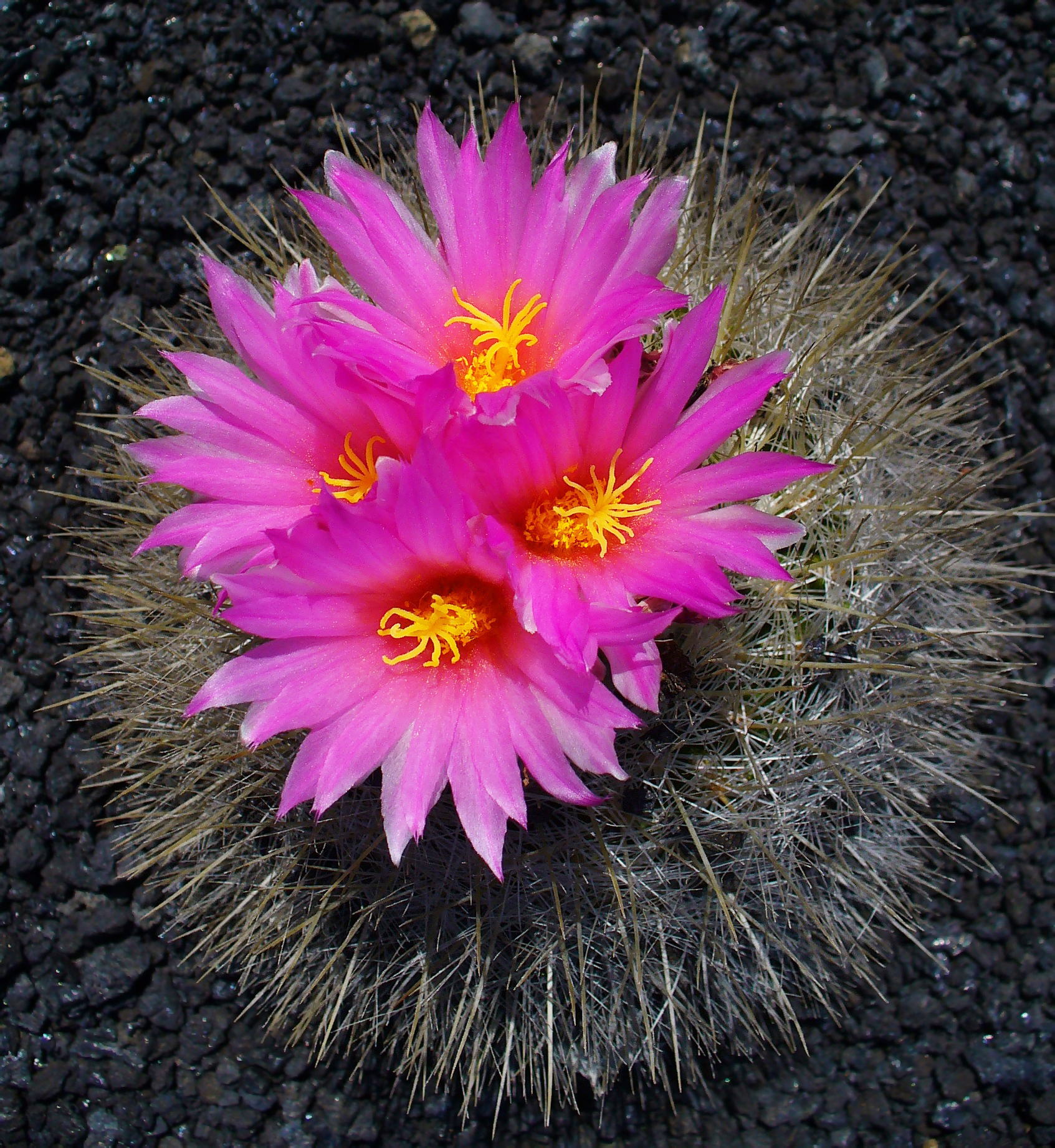

Conservation status
- Near Threatened (IUCN 3.1)

Scientific classification
- Kingdom: Plantae
- Clade: Embryophytes
- Clade: Tracheophytes
- Clade: Angiosperms
- Clade: Eudicots
- Order: Caryophyllales
- Family: Cactaceae
- Subfamily: Cactoideae
- Genus: Thelocactus
- Species: T. macdowellii

Binomial name
- Thelocactus macdowellii (Rebut ex Quehl) W.T.Marshall

Synonyms
- List: Echinocactus macdowellii Orcutt; Echinocactus macdowellii Rebut ex Quehl; Echinomastus macdowellii (Orcutt) Britton & Rose; Neolloydia macdowellii (Rebut ex Quehl) H.E.Moore; Thelocactus conothelos var. macdowellii (W.T.Marshall) Glass & R.B.Foster

= Thelocactus macdowellii =

Species of cactus

Thelocactus macdowellii, called the Chihuahuan snowball, is a species of cactus native to northeastern Mexico. It has gained the Royal Horticultural Society's Award of Garden Merit.

== Description ==
Thelocactus macdowellii is a small, spherical cactus, typically 4 to 10 centimeters (1.6 to 3.9 in) tall and 4 to 12 centimeters (1.6 to 4.7 in) wide, with a yellowish apex covered in woolly hairs. It has 30 or more ribs, each with 5 to 7 millimeter high, conical, rhombic warts at the base. The areoles, initially woolly, bear 15 to 25 needle-shaped marginal spines, 1.5 to 2 centimeters long, and 3 to 4 central spines, each 3 to 5 centimeters long and straw yellow.

The flowers are funnel-shaped, 4 to 8 centimeters wide and up to 4 centimeters long, varying in color from rose red to magenta. The ovaries are smooth and have broad scales.

== Distribution ==
Endemic to the Mexican states of Coahuila, Nuevo León, and the Chihuahuan Desert, Thelocactus macdowellii grows on scrubland and limestone hills in a very restricted area at an altitude of 1500 meters.

== Taxonomy ==
First described as Echinocactus macdowellii in 1894 by Leopold Quehl, with the specific epithet honoring the Mexican gardener and plant collector José Alberto McDowell. The species was later placed in the genus Thelocactus by William Taylor Marshall in 1947.
