= Thelocactus multicephalus =

Conservation status
- Least Concern (IUCN 3.1)

Scientific classification
- Kingdom: Plantae
- Clade: Tracheophytes
- Clade: Angiosperms
- Clade: Eudicots
- Order: Caryophyllales
- Family: Cactaceae
- Subfamily: Cactoideae
- Genus: Thelocactus
- Species: T. multicephalus

Binomial name
- Thelocactus multicephalus Halda & Panar.

Synonyms
- Thelocactus rinconensis subsp. multicephalus (Halda & Panar.) Lüthy 1999

Species of cactus

Thelocactus multicephalus is a species of cactus endemic to Nuevo León, Mexico.

== Description ==
Thelocactus multicephalus is a small perennial gray-green cactus that grows in clusters, growing 6 - 15 cm (5.9 in) tall and is between 8–20 cm (3.1–7.9 in) in diameter. It has conical tubercles. The areoles have 4 to 5 central spines are 1–12 cm (0.39–4.72 in) long that are grey, radial spines are absent. Flowers, about 3–6 cm (1.2–2.4 in) long, are funnel-shaped and white and rarely light pink, growing from new growth at the top of the plant. Seeds are 1.6–2.1 mm (0.063–0.083 in) long.

== Distribution ==
The plant is found in Nuevo León and San Luis Potosí, Mexico growing on limestone hills at elevations between 1600 and 1700 meters

== Taxonomy ==
Echinocactus multicephalus was first discovered near Sandia, by A. Hofer and collected by JJ. Halda in February 1985. The plant was described in 1998.
