= Thelocactus buekii =

Conservation status
- Least Concern (IUCN 3.1)

Scientific classification
- Kingdom: Plantae
- Clade: Tracheophytes
- Clade: Angiosperms
- Clade: Eudicots
- Order: Caryophyllales
- Family: Cactaceae
- Subfamily: Cactoideae
- Genus: Thelocactus
- Species: T. buekii

Binomial name
- Thelocactus buekii (E.Klein bis) Britton & Rose 1923

Synonyms
- Echinocactus buekii E.Klein bis 1859; Thelocactus tulensis var. buekii (E.Klein bis) E.F.Anderson 1987; Thelocactus tulensis subsp. buekii (E.Klein bis) N.P.Taylor 1998

Species of cactus

Thelocactus buekii is a species of cactus. It is endemic to Mexico.

== Description ==
Thelocactus buekii is a solitary, globular cactus, with depressed stems, with dark reddish to dull green body 5 to 22 centimeters high and 11 to 16 centimeters in diameter. It has conical tubercles that are 1.5 to 2.5 cm long. The areoles are woolly when young, with 3 to 7 central spines that are gray to red, measuring only 2 centimeters long. Additionally, it has 7 to 12 radial spines. The flowers of Thelocactus buekii are pink, measuring 8 cm in diameter.

== Distribution ==
Thelocactus buekii is native to the limestone hills in the Chihuahuan Desert between Dr Arroyo and Galean of Nuevo León, Mexico at elevations of 800 to 1000 meters.

== Taxonomy ==
It was first described in 1859 as Echinocactus buekii by Eduard Petrowitsch Klein. The plant was named after German botanist Johannes Nicolaus Buek.
