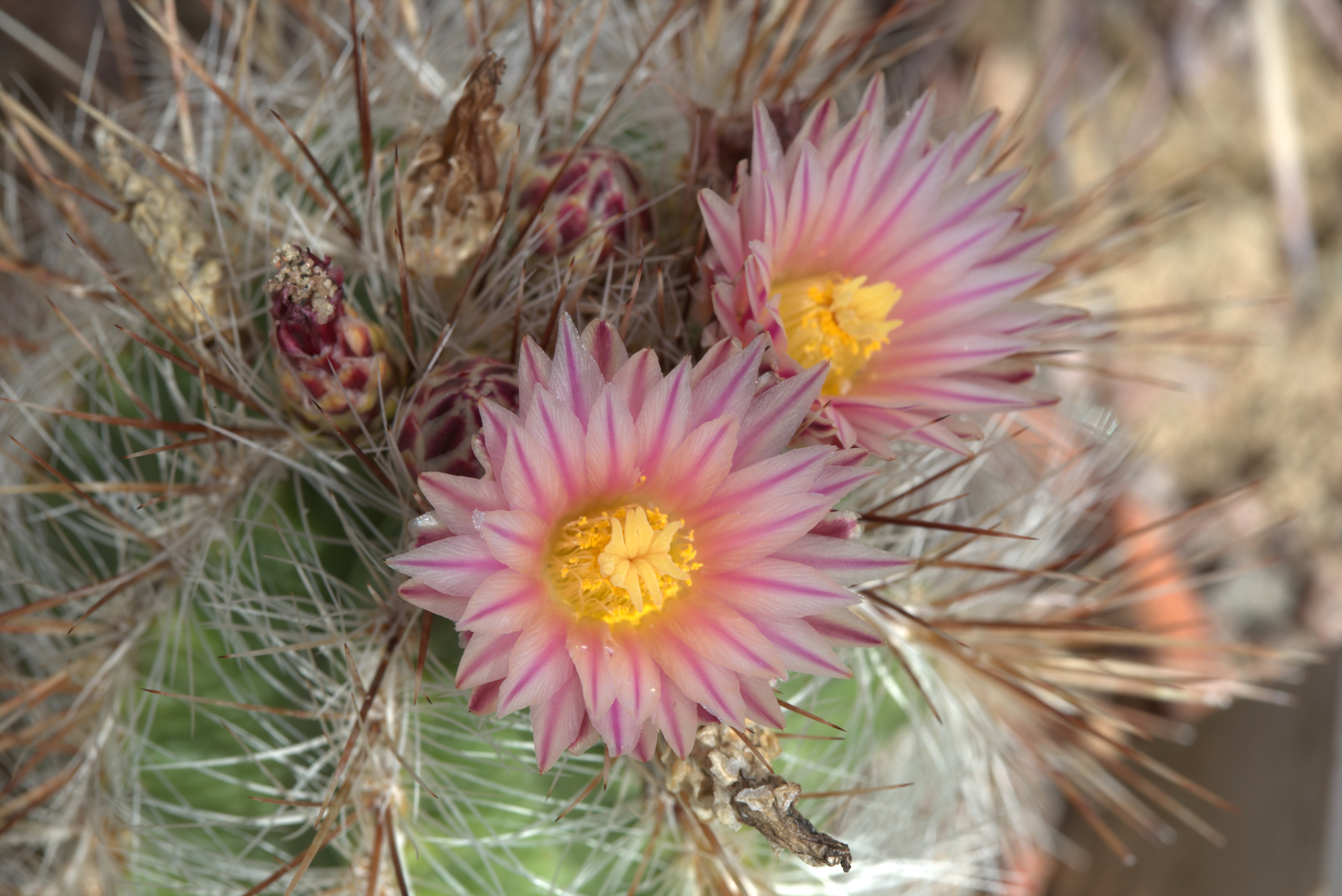

Scientific classification
- Kingdom: Plantae
- Clade: Tracheophytes
- Clade: Angiosperms
- Clade: Eudicots
- Order: Caryophyllales
- Family: Cactaceae
- Subfamily: Cactoideae
- Genus: Thelocactus
- Species: T. lausseri

Binomial name
- Thelocactus lausseri Říha & Busek

= Thelocactus lausseri =

Species of cactus

Thelocactus lausseri is a species of cactus endemic to Mexico.

== Description ==
Thelocactus lausseri grows as a single, spherical or short, elongated cactus. It has a grey-green body that is 7 to 10 cm (2.8 to 3.9 in) tall and 5 to 8.5 cm (2.0 to 3.3 in) in diameter. The cactus has 8 ribs arranged in a slight spiral. The areoles, which lack glands, are about 5 to 6 mm (0.20 to 0.24 in) in diameter. The rounded warts are 7 to 9 mm (0.28 to 0.35 in) in diameter and 8 to 12 mm (0.31 to 0.47 in) high. It has 20 to 25 radial spines that are 18 to 25 mm (0.71 to 0.98 in) long and silvery-white to yellowish in color. There are 4 central spines (occasionally 6) that are 6 to 10 cm (2.4 to 3.9 in) long, yellow to greyish, straight or slightly curved, and needle-shaped. The flowers are 2.5 to 4.4 cm (0.98 to 1.73 in) long and wide, ranging in color from whitish to light pink with a darker central stripe. The fruits have scales and burst open when dry. The seeds are 2 mm (0.079 in) long and thick.

== Distribution ==
Thelocactus lausseri is found growing in shrubland on limestone and calcareous soil in the Sierra de las Ovejas, Coahuila, at elevations between 800 and 1500 meters.

== Taxonomy ==
It was first described in 1986 by Jan Říha and Josef Busek. The species name lausseri honors the German plant collector Alfons Lausser.
