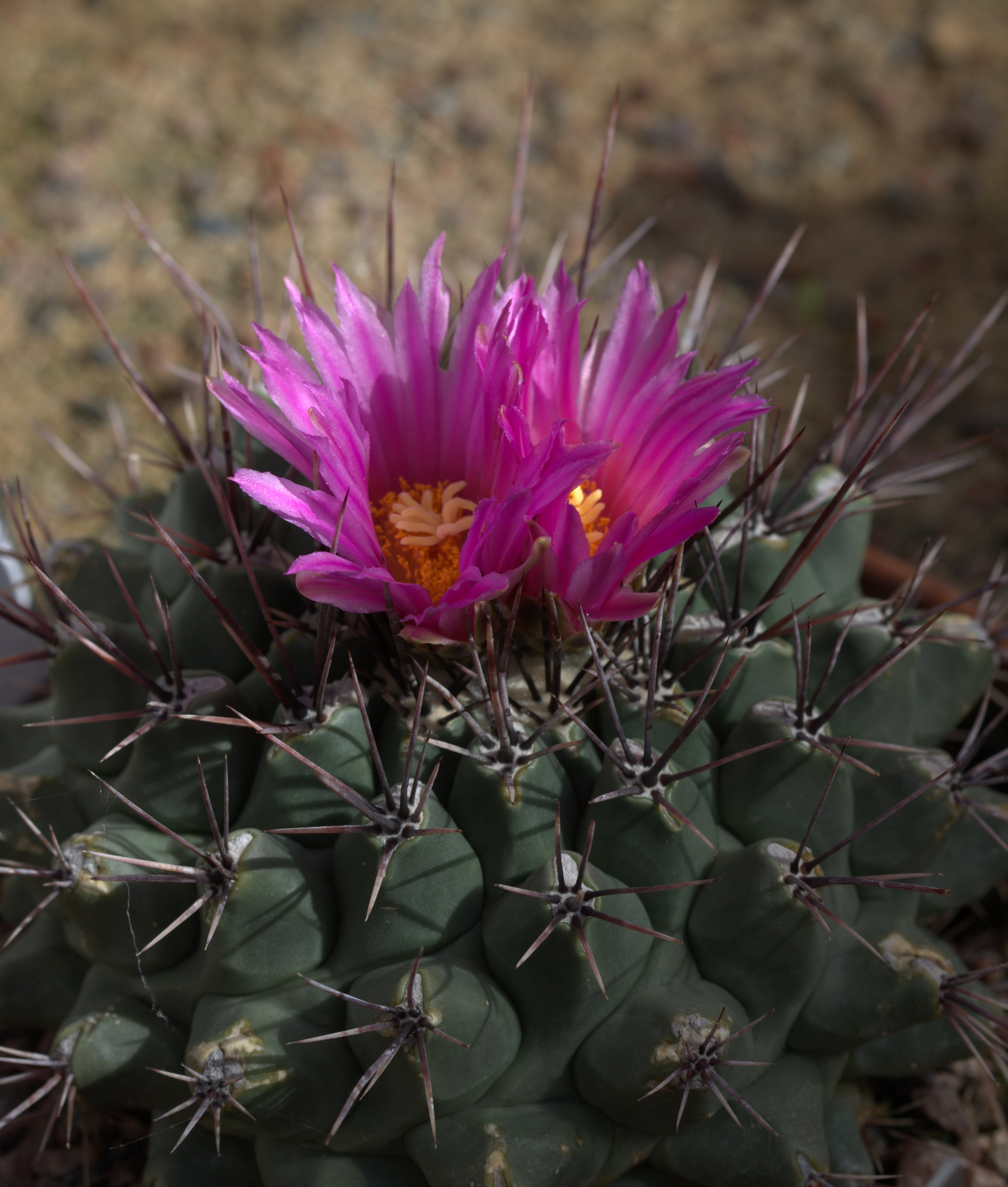

Conservation status
- Least Concern (IUCN 3.1)

Scientific classification
- Kingdom: Plantae
- Clade: Tracheophytes
- Clade: Angiosperms
- Clade: Eudicots
- Order: Caryophyllales
- Family: Cactaceae
- Subfamily: Cactoideae
- Genus: Thelocactus
- Species: T. tulensis

Binomial name
- Thelocactus tulensis (Poselg.) Britton & Rose

Synonyms
- Echinocactus tulensis Poselg. 1853; Thelocactus buekii subsp. jarmilae Halda & Horáček 2000; Thelocactus buekii subsp. matudae (Sánchez-Mej. & A.B.Lau) Mosco & Zanov. 2000; Thelocactus krainzianus Oehme 1940; Thelocactus leucacanthus f. krainzianus (Oehme) H.Nagl 1991; Thelocactus matudae Sánchez-Mej. & A.B.Lau 1978; Thelocactus nidulans subsp. matudae (Sánchez-Mej. & A.B.Lau) N.P.Taylor 1998; Thelocactus santaclarensis Halda, Kupčák & Sladk. 2000; Thelocactus tulensis subsp. huizachensis Halda & Sladk. 2000; Thelocactus tulensis subsp. kupcaki Halda & Sladk. 2000; Thelocactus tulensis var. longispinus Y.Itô 1981; Thelocactus tulensis subsp. matudae (Sánchez-Mej. & A.B.Lau) N.P.Taylor 1998; Thelocactus tulensis var. matudae (Sánchez-Mej. & A.B.Lau) E.F.Anderson 1987; Thelocactus tulensis subsp. vaskoanus (Halda, Hovorka & Zatloukal) Halda, Kupčák & Malina 2002; Thelocactus vaskoanus Halda, Hovorka & Zatloukal 2000

= Thelocactus tulensis =

Species of cactus

Thelocactus tulensis is a species of cactus. It is endemic to Mexico.

== Description ==
Thelocactus tulensis is a solitary, spherical cactus, sometimes slightly elongated, with a dark dull green body up to 25 centimeters high and 8 centimeters in diameter. It has 10 ribs that are bulbous to cone-shaped, up to 2 centimeters high and in diameter, with thick, fleshy warts that have many edges. The areoles are woolly when young, at a distance of 2.5 centimeters, and later become naked. It has 6 to 8 radial spines that are initially brownish and then turn white, measuring only 1 to 1.5 centimeters long. Additionally, it has 1 to 3 central spines that are up to 4 centimeters long, straight or curved, and whitish to horn-colored with a dark tip.

The flowers of Thelocactus tulensis are widespread, measuring 2.5 to 5 centimeters long and 3.5 to 8 centimeters in diameter. Their color varies from silvery white to delicate pink, with a carmine red central stripe. The scar of the flower is pale yellow. The fruits are green to greenish-magenta or whitish-brown, measuring 11 to 18 millimeters long and about 7 to 10 millimeters in diameter. The seeds are dark with a finely tuberous testa cell pattern.

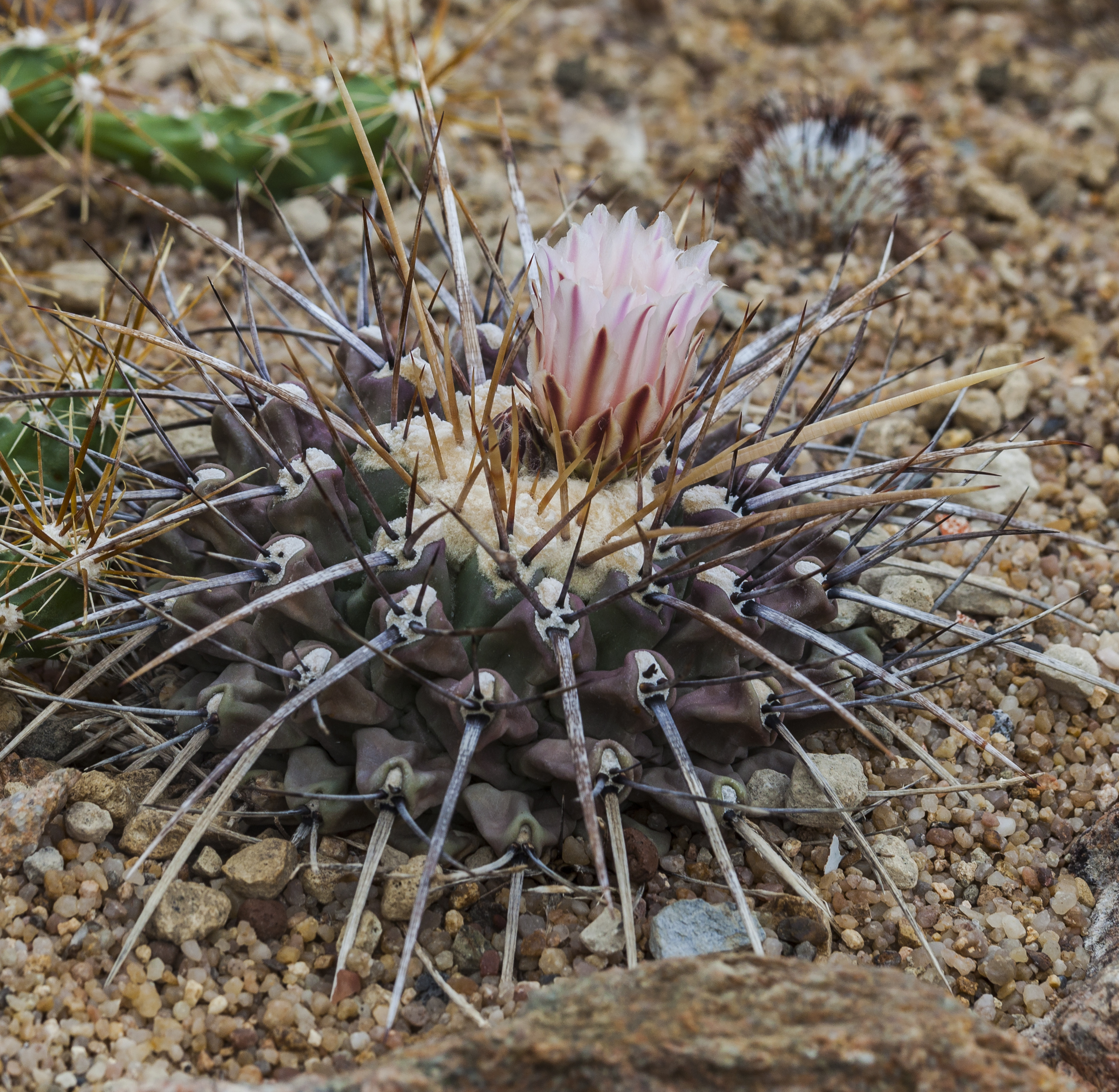
Flower buds

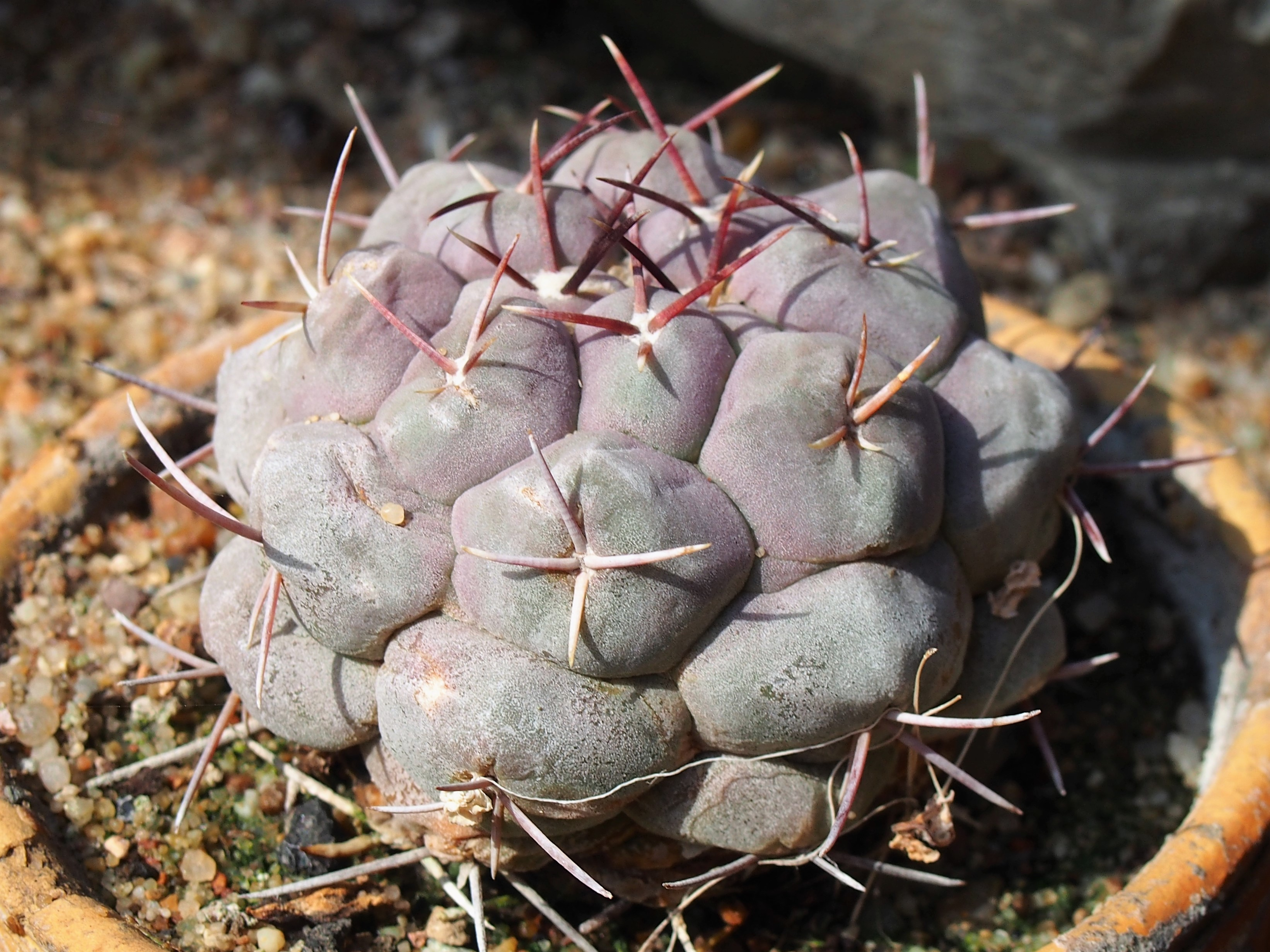
Plant habit

== Distribution ==
Thelocactus tulensis is native to the limestone hills in the Chihuahuan Desert in Tamaulipas, Nuevo León, and San Luis Potosí, Mexico at elevations of 1200 to 1900 meters.

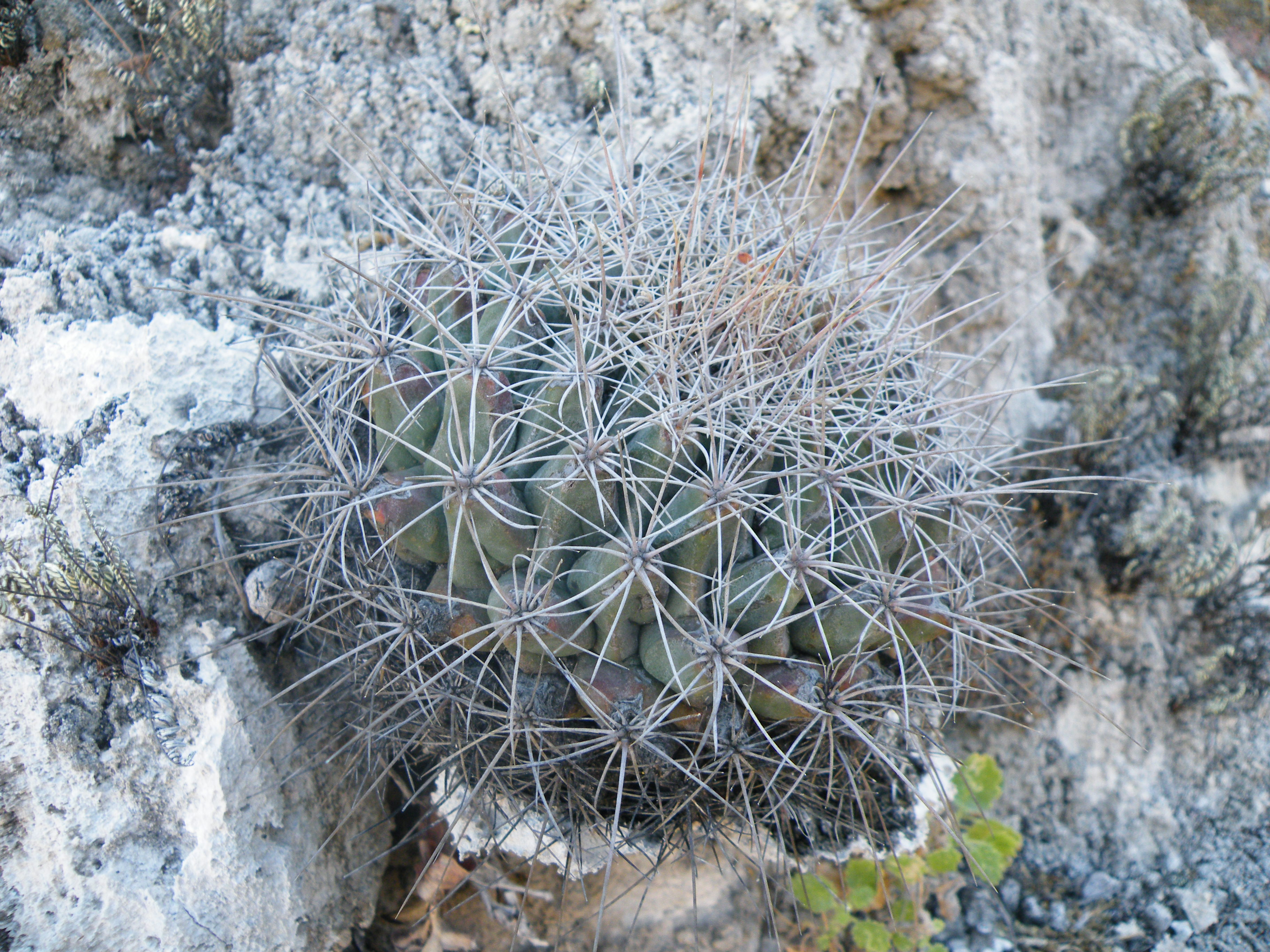
Plant growing near Rayones, Nuevo Leon

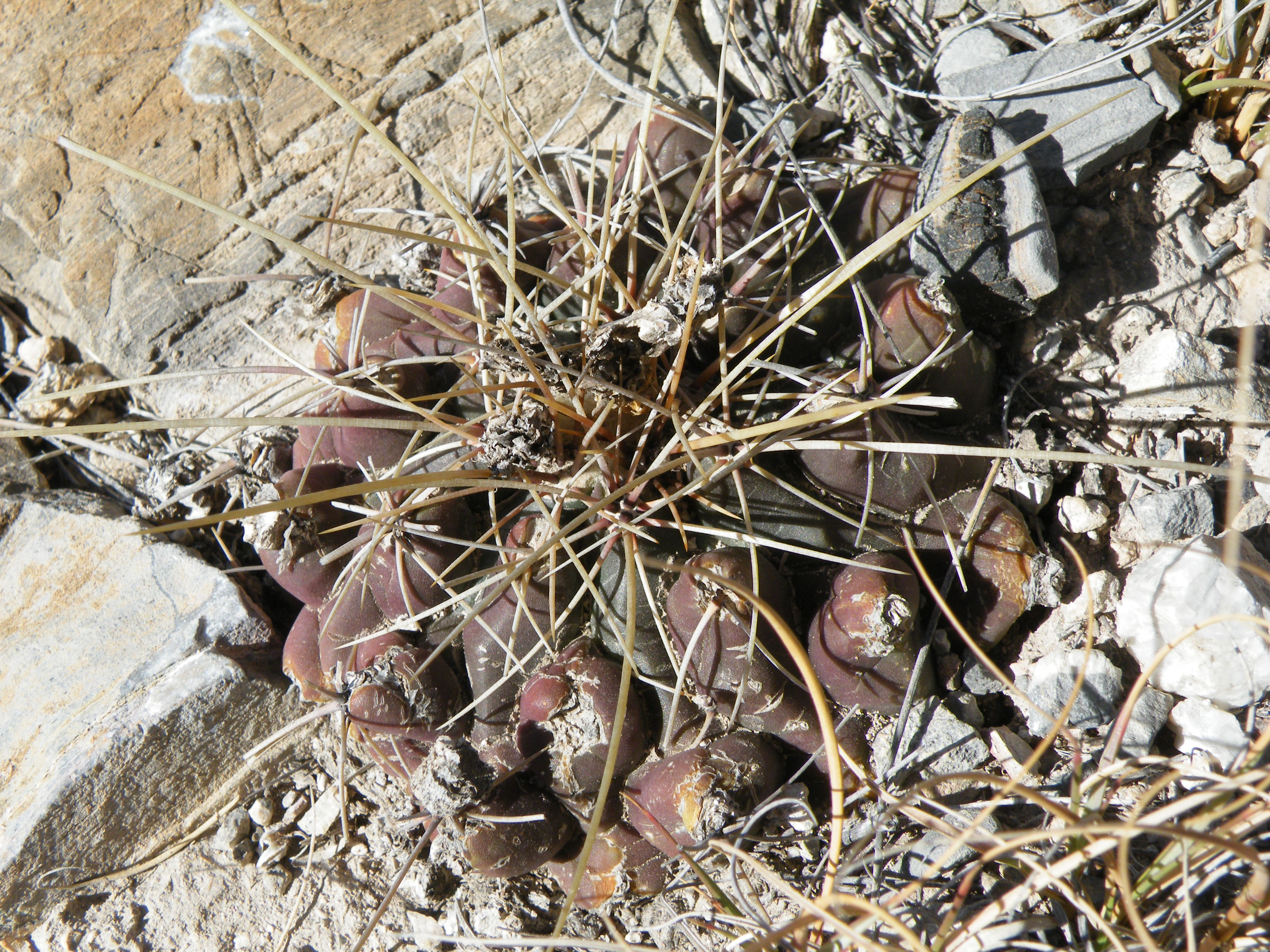
Plant growing in habitat near San Roberto

== Taxonomy ==
First described as Echinocactus tulensis in 1853 by Heinrich Poselger, the species was later placed in the genus Thelocactus by Nathaniel Lord Britton and Joseph Nelson Rose in 1923. The specific epithet "tulensis" refers to the occurrence of the species near Tula in Mexico.
