= Thelocactus tepelmemensis =

Conservation status
- Vulnerable (IUCN 3.1)

Scientific classification
- Kingdom: Plantae
- Clade: Tracheophytes
- Clade: Angiosperms
- Clade: Eudicots
- Order: Caryophyllales
- Family: Cactaceae
- Subfamily: Cactoideae
- Genus: Thelocactus
- Species: T. tepelmemensis

Binomial name
- Thelocactus tepelmemensis T.J.Davis, H.M.Hern., G.D.Starr & Gómez-Hin. 2018

Species of cactus

Thelocactus tepelmemensis is a species of cactus endemic to Mexico.

== Description ==
Thelocactus tepelmemensis is a small perennial globose, green cactus that grows in solitary, growing 14–30.5 cm (5.5–12.0 in) tall and is between 10.5 cm (4.1 in) in diameter. It has 11 to 13 rbs that are round at the apex. The areoles have a single central spines are 1–4.2 cm (0.39–1.65 in) long that are tan with red tip, and 6-9 radial spines. Flowers, about 1.3–2.3 cm (0.51–0.91 in) long, are funnel-shaped and reddish pink with a white center, growing from new growth at the top of the plant. Fruits are ovoid, reddish purple and 1 x 0.5 cm. Seeds are 1.06–1.21 mm (0.042–0.048 in) long.

== Distribution ==
The plant is found in Tepelmeme, Oaxaca, Mexico growing on limestone rock at elevations between 1420 and 1460 meters. Plants are found growing along with Opuntia pubescens, Opuntia decumbens, Pilosocereus chrysacanthus, Cephalocereus columna-trajani, Escontria chiotilla, Mammillaria carnea, Mammillaria albilanata, Mammillaria sphacelata subsp. viperina, Cnidoscolus multilobus, Fouquieria purpusii, and Agave titanota.

== Taxonomy ==
Thelocactus tepelmemensis was first described in 2018 and named after Tepelmeme Villa de Morelos, the discovery location.
