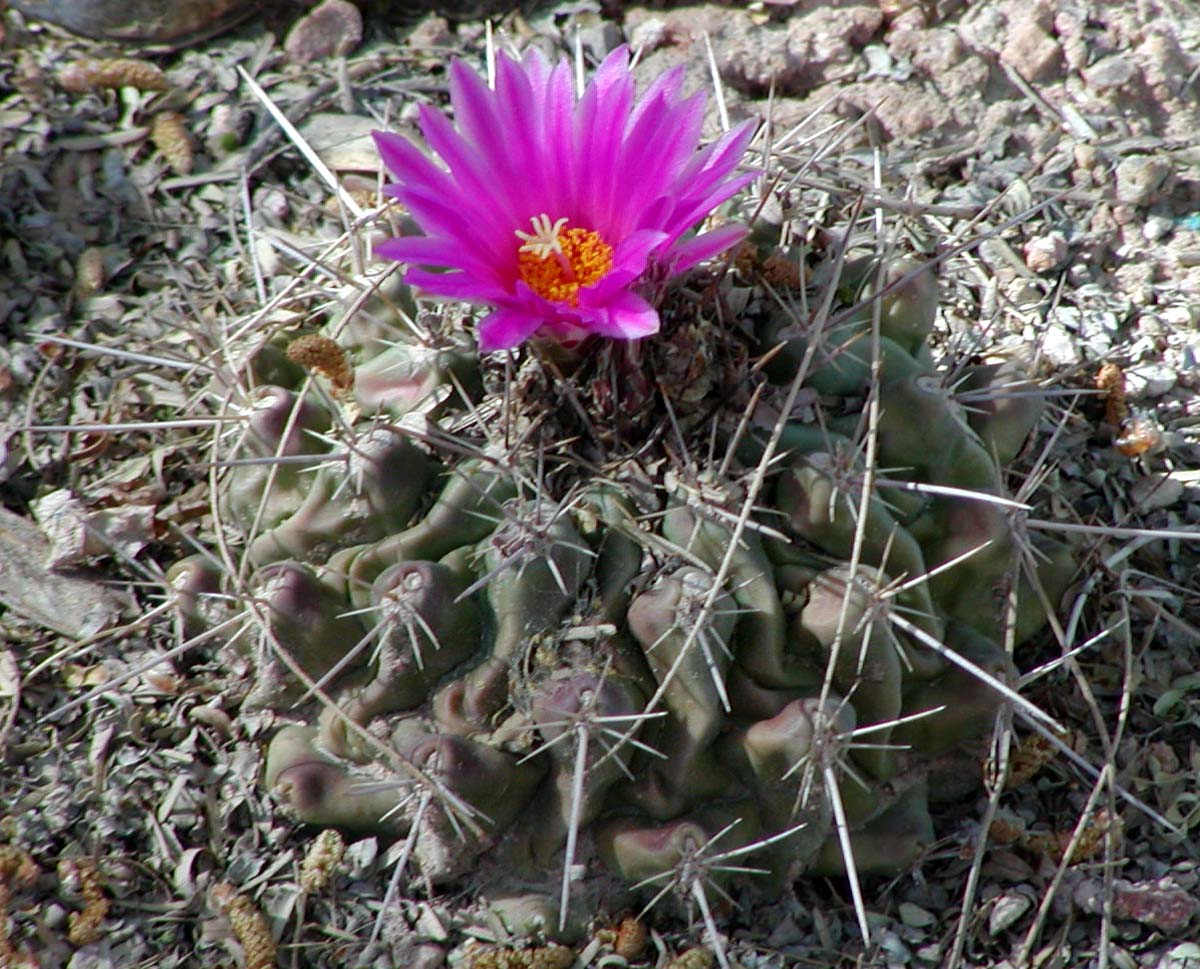

Conservation status
- Least Concern (IUCN 3.1)

Scientific classification
- Kingdom: Plantae
- Clade: Tracheophytes
- Clade: Angiosperms
- Clade: Eudicots
- Order: Caryophyllales
- Family: Cactaceae
- Subfamily: Cactoideae
- Genus: Thelocactus
- Species: T. rinconensis

Binomial name
- Thelocactus rinconensis (Poselg.) Britton & Rose

Synonyms
- Echinocactus lophothele Salm-Dyck; Echinocactus nidulans Quehl; Echinocactus phymatothelos Poselg.; Echinocactus rinconensis Poselg.; Thelocactus lophothele (Salm-Dyck) Britton & Rose; Thelocactus nidulans (Quehl) Britton & Rose; Thelocactus phymatothele (Poselg.) Britton & Rose; Thelocactus rinconensis subsp. freudenbergeri (R.Haas) Mosco & Zanov.; Thelocactus rinconensis subsp. hintonii Lüthy; Thelocactus rinconensis subsp. icamolensis Halda & Kupčák; Thelocactus rinconensis subsp. nidulans (Quehl) Glass; Thelocactus rinconensis subsp. palomaensis Pavlíček & Zatloukal; Thelocactus rinconensis subsp. phymatothelos (Poselg.) Glass; Thelocactus rinconensis var. freudenbergeri R.Haas; Thelocactus rinconensis var. nidulans (Quehl) Glass & R.A.Foster; Thelocactus rinconensis var. phymatothelos (Poselg.) Glass & R.A.Foster

= Thelocactus rinconensis =

Species of cactus

Thelocactus rinconensis, synonyms including Thelocactus nidulans, is a species of cactus. It is endemic to north-east Mexico.

== Description ==
Thelocactus rinconensis is a small perennial gray-green cactus, growing 6 - 8 centimeters high and is between 12 - 20 centimeters in diameter. It has 20-25 ribs with marked with angular tubercles. The areolas are 2 to 2.5 centimeters apart, circular or elliptical and covered with white wooly hairs. Areoles have 3 to 4 central spines are 6 - 8 centimeters long It features up to six dark brown to black main spines and thin, radial spines that are 1.3-1.5 cm long. Flowers, about 4 cm long and 2.5-7.5 cm wide, are funnel-shaped and yellow or whitish, growing from new growth at the top of the plant. Fruits are spherical to oblong with scales, 7-9 mm in diameter, greenish or yellowish. Seeds are 1.7-2 mm long

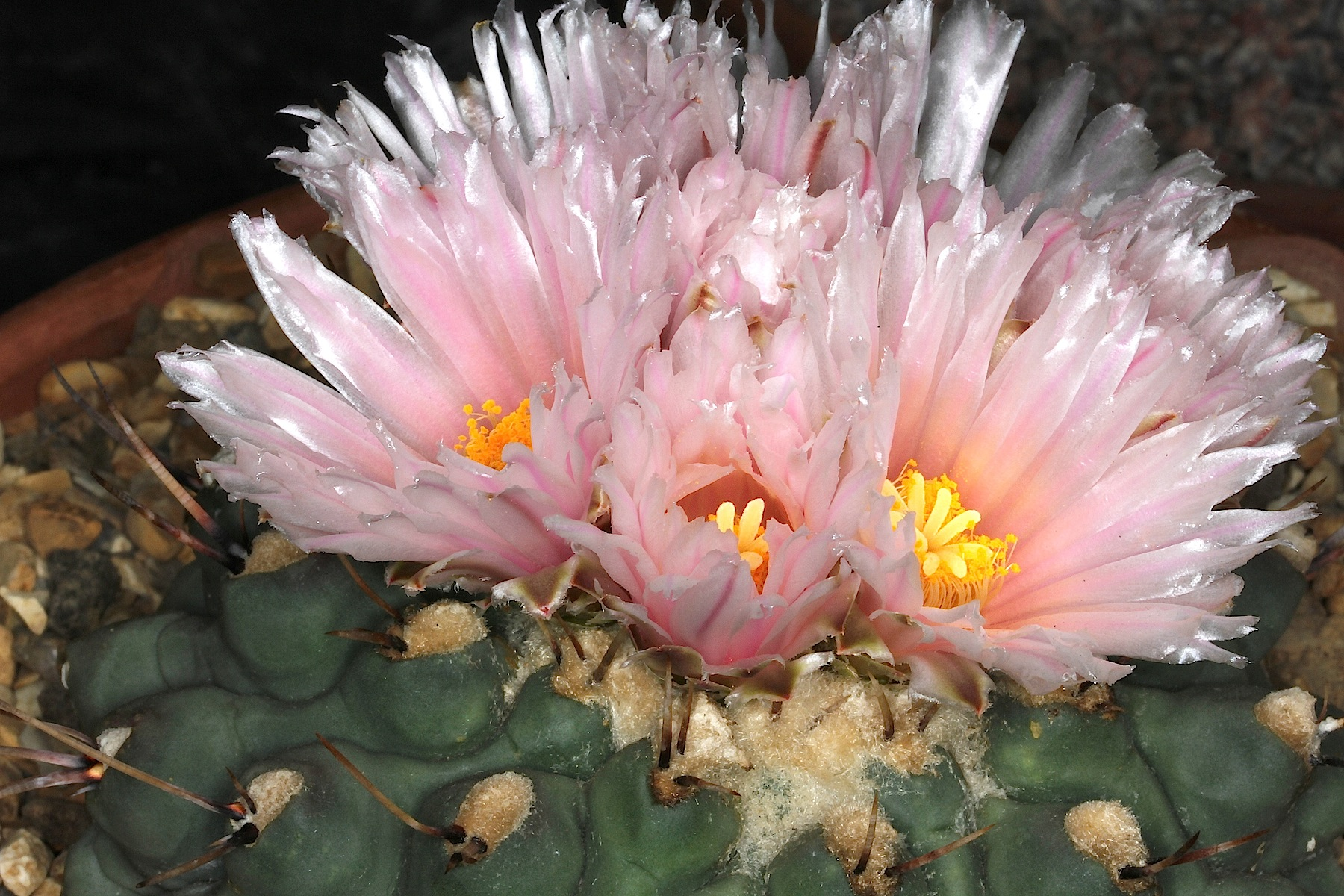
Pink flower cultivar

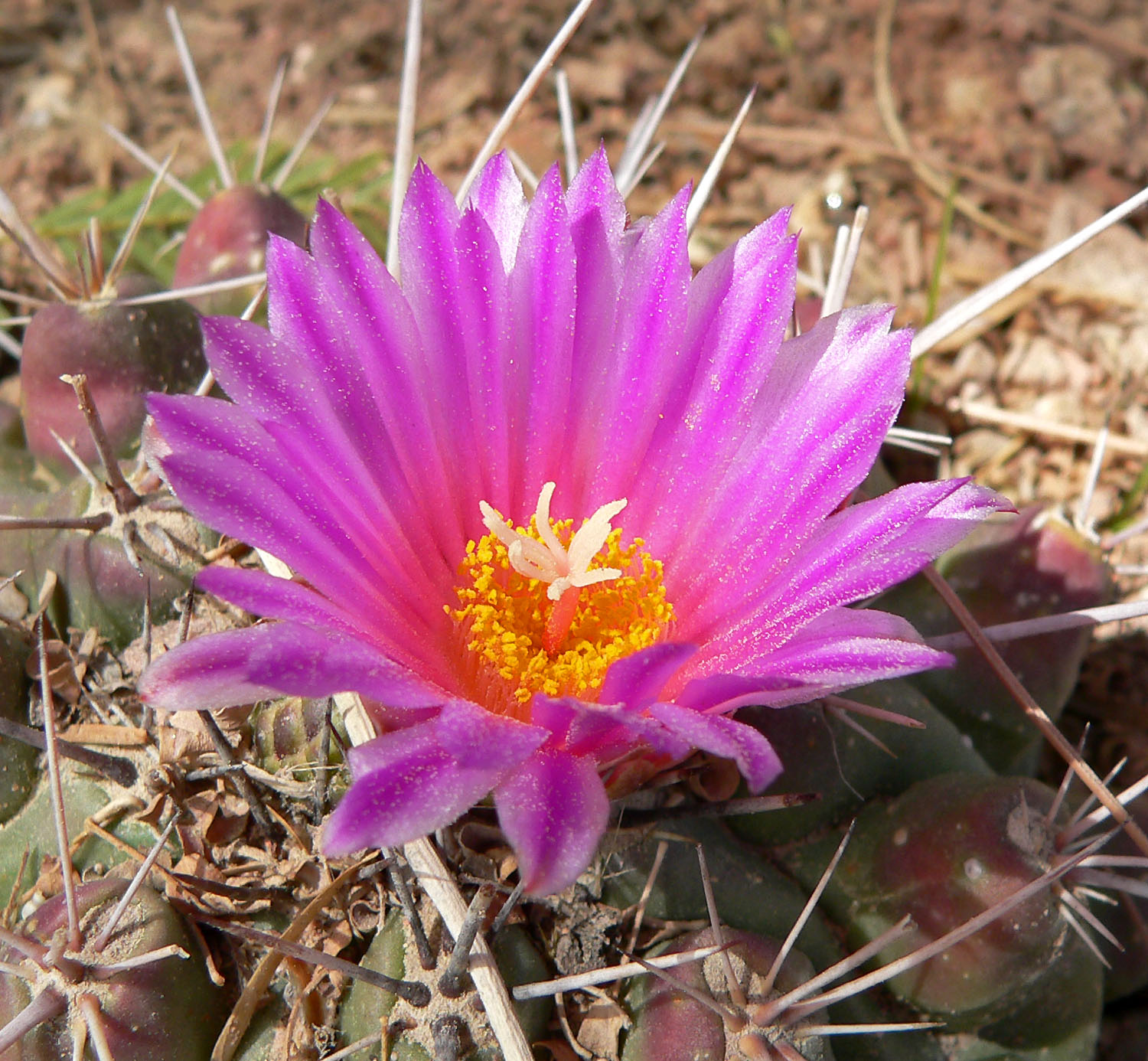

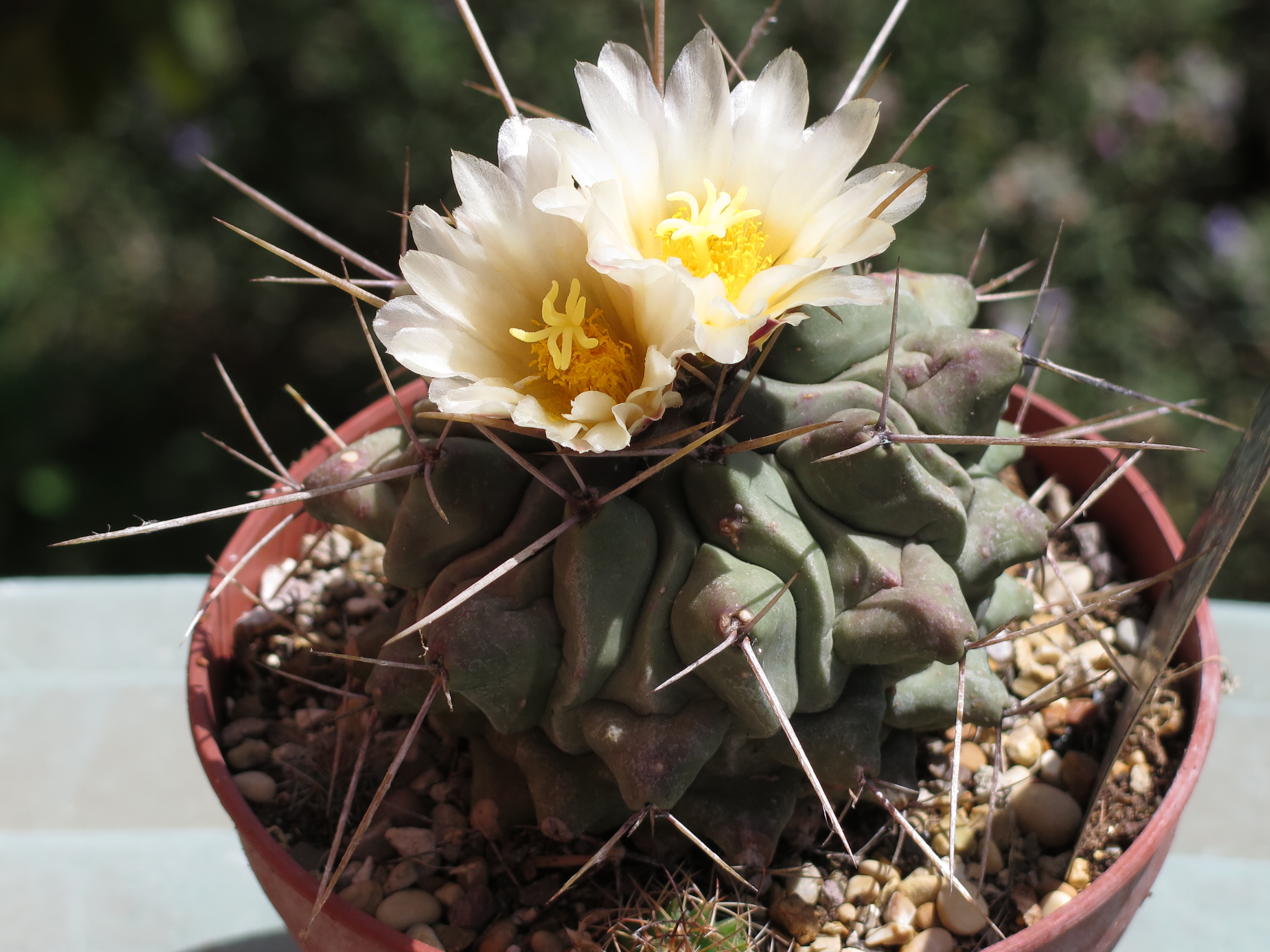
White flower plant

== Distribution ==
The plant is found in the Chihuahuan Desert of Coahuila and Nuevo Leon, Mexico growing at elevations of 1200-1900 meters growing in xerophytic shrubland on calcareous soils.

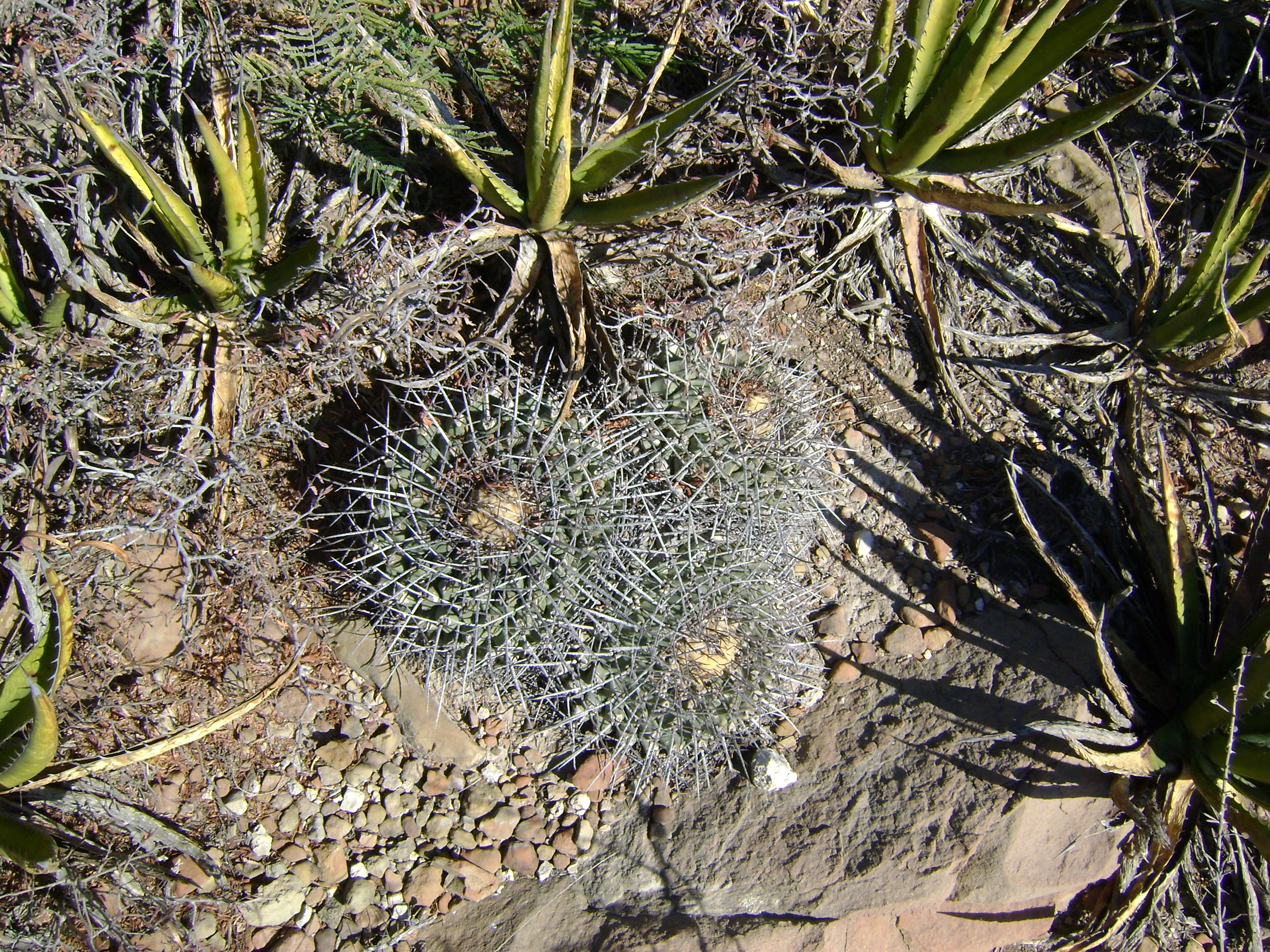
Plant growing near La Gloria in Nuevo Leon

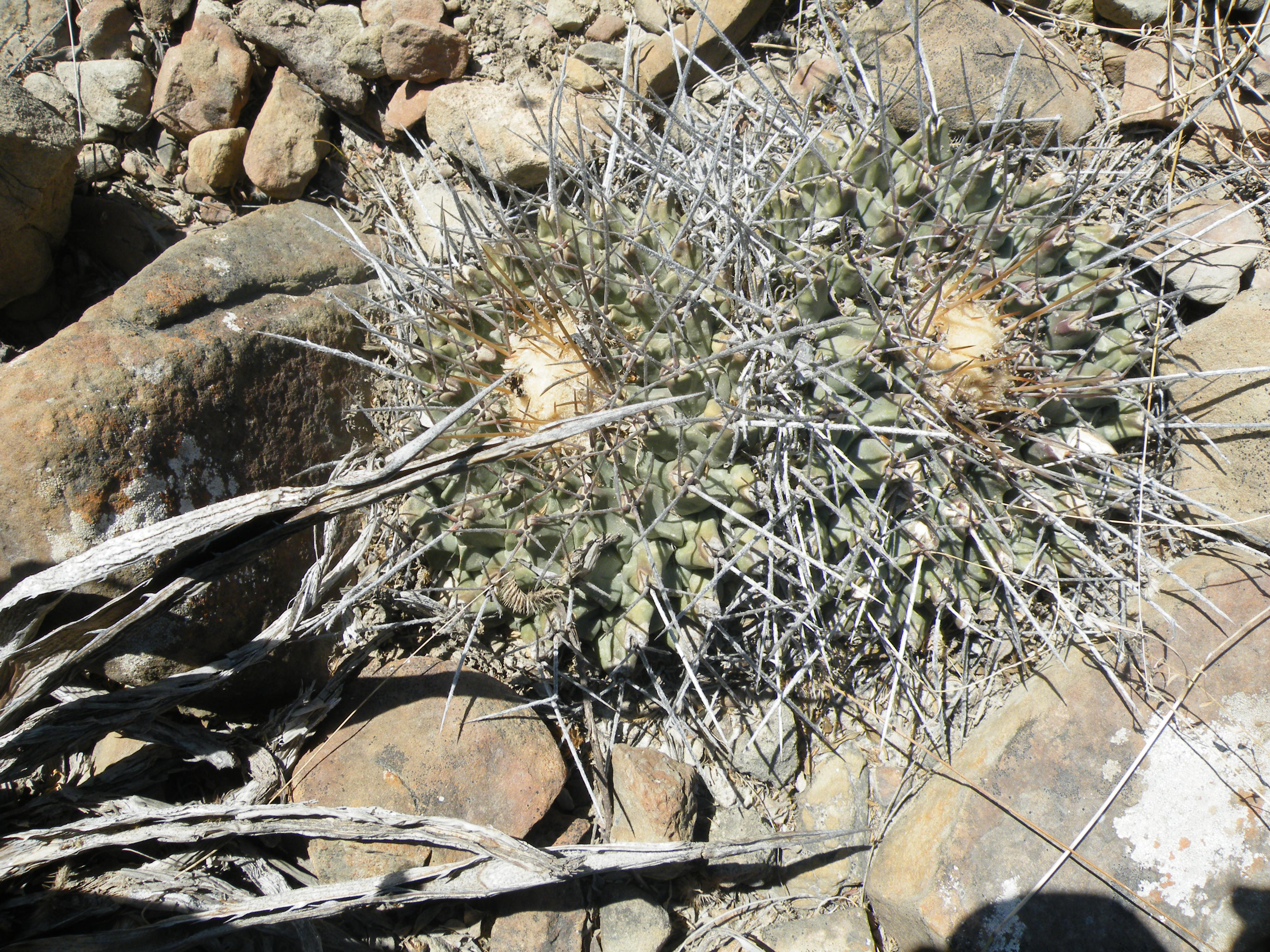

== Taxonomy ==
Echinocactus rinconensis was described in The Cactaceae in 1855 by Heinrich Poselger. Nathaniel Lord Britton and Joseph Nelson Rose placed the species in the genus Thelocactus in 1923.

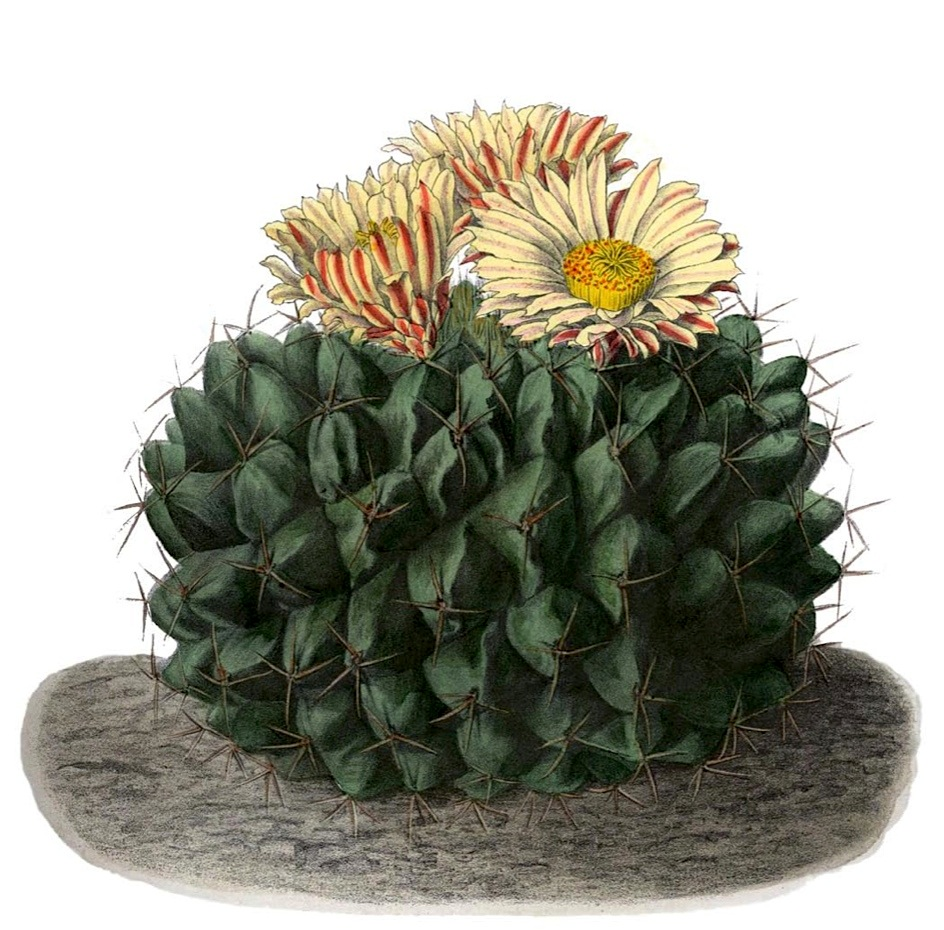
Botanical illustration plate from Iconographia Cactacearum

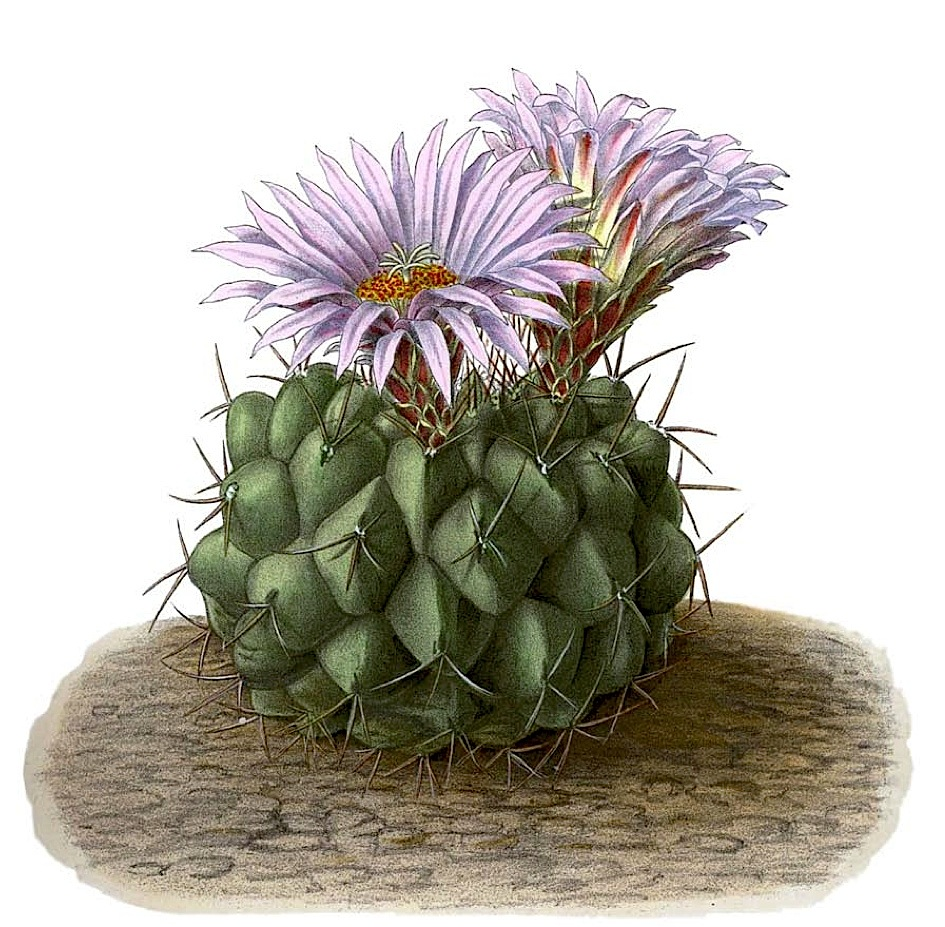
Botanical illustration plate from Iconographia Cactacearum
