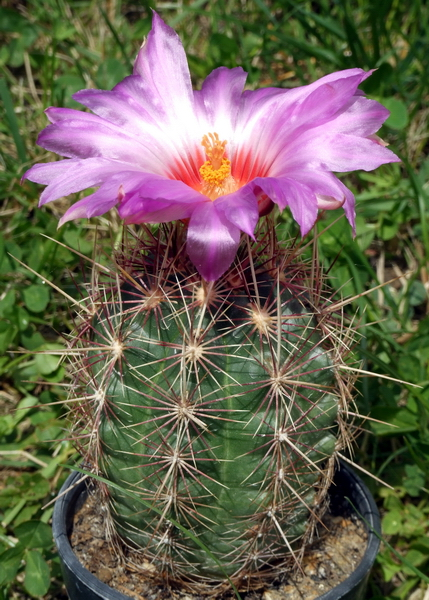

Conservation status
- Least Concern (IUCN 3.1)

Scientific classification
- Kingdom: Plantae
- Clade: Tracheophytes
- Clade: Angiosperms
- Clade: Eudicots
- Order: Caryophyllales
- Family: Cactaceae
- Subfamily: Cactoideae
- Genus: Thelocactus
- Species: T. bicolor

Binomial name
- Thelocactus bicolor (Galeotti ex Pfeiffer) Britton & Rose

Synonyms
- Echinocactus bicolor Galeotti ex Pfeiff. 1848; Ferocactus bicolor (Galeotti ex Pfeiff.) N.P.Taylor 1979

= Thelocactus bicolor =

Species of cactus

Thelocactus bicolor, the glory of Texas, is a species of flowering plant in the cactus family, widely distributed in the northern Chihuahuan Desert of Texas and Mexico.

== Description ==
Plants are usually solitary, but may form clumps. It typically grows to about 6 to 10 centimeters in diameter, growing to 50 cm (20 in) tall, it is a perennial with succulent stems with a blue or gray-green body that is somewhat felty at the top and often thorny. The cactus has 8 to 13 straight or twisted ribs, each divided into crookedly truncated cusps up to 1.5 centimeters high. It also has 9 to 18 marginal spines that are protruding or slightly curved and up to 3 centimeters long, as well as 1 to 4 central spines that are all up to 3 centimeters long.

The central spines are brightly colored, white or reddish in the middle, or red at the base and yellow at the tip, gradually becoming grayish with age. The lowest central spine is stretched out and prim, while the upper ones are erect and flat. Large daisy-like flowers, 5–8 cm (2.0–3.1 in) in diameter with ciliate edges, are borne in summer. The petals are purplish-pink, fading to white. The inner petal tips form a circle of red surrounding a prominent yellow boss. The fruits are reddish-brown, scaly, and edible.

== Distribution ==
These plants are primarily found in the northern Chihuahuan desert in Texas and Mexico (Chihuahua, Coahuila, Durango, Nuevo León, San Luis Potosí, Tamaulipas, Zacatecas) at elevations of 800-2200 meters. They typically grow on flat gravelly soils, limestone or sandstone slopes of hills or outcrops, and alluvial fans in desert or grassland environments.

== Taxonomy ==
The first description of Thelocactus bicolor was made in 1848 by Ludwig Karl Georg Pfeiffer. The specific epithet "bicolor" comes from Latin, meaning 'two-colored,' and refers to the two-colored flowers of the species. Nathaniel Lord Britton and Joseph Nelson Rose placed the species in the genus Thelocactus in 1922.

== Subspecies ==
Accepted Subspecies

Image	Scientific name	Description	Distribution
	Thelocactus bicolor subsp. bicolor	base subspecies	Texas to NE. Mexico
	Thelocactus bicolor subsp. bolaensis (Runge) Doweld	Tufted growth and conical stems. The flower is purple-red and the spines are light to white	Mexico (southwestern part of the Coahuila in the Sierra Bola mountains)
	Thelocactus bicolor subsp. flavidispinus (Backeb.) N.P.Taylor	Differs from base species by having smaller yellow spines	SW. Texas
	Thelocactus bicolor subsp. heterochromus (F.A.C.Weber) Mosco & Zanov.	Robust cacti with strong colored spines and flowers up to 10 cm in diameter	Mexico (Durango)
Thelocactus bicolor subsp. schwarzii	Thelocactus bicolor subsp. schwarzii (Backeb.) N.P.Taylor	It differs from the basic species by the absence of a central thorn	Mexico (Tamaulipas)

== Cultivation ==
This cactus is grown as an ornamental. A warm, dry, sunny spot in sharply-drained specialist cactus compost must be provided. It has gained the Royal Horticultural Society's Award of Garden Merit.

== Gallery ==
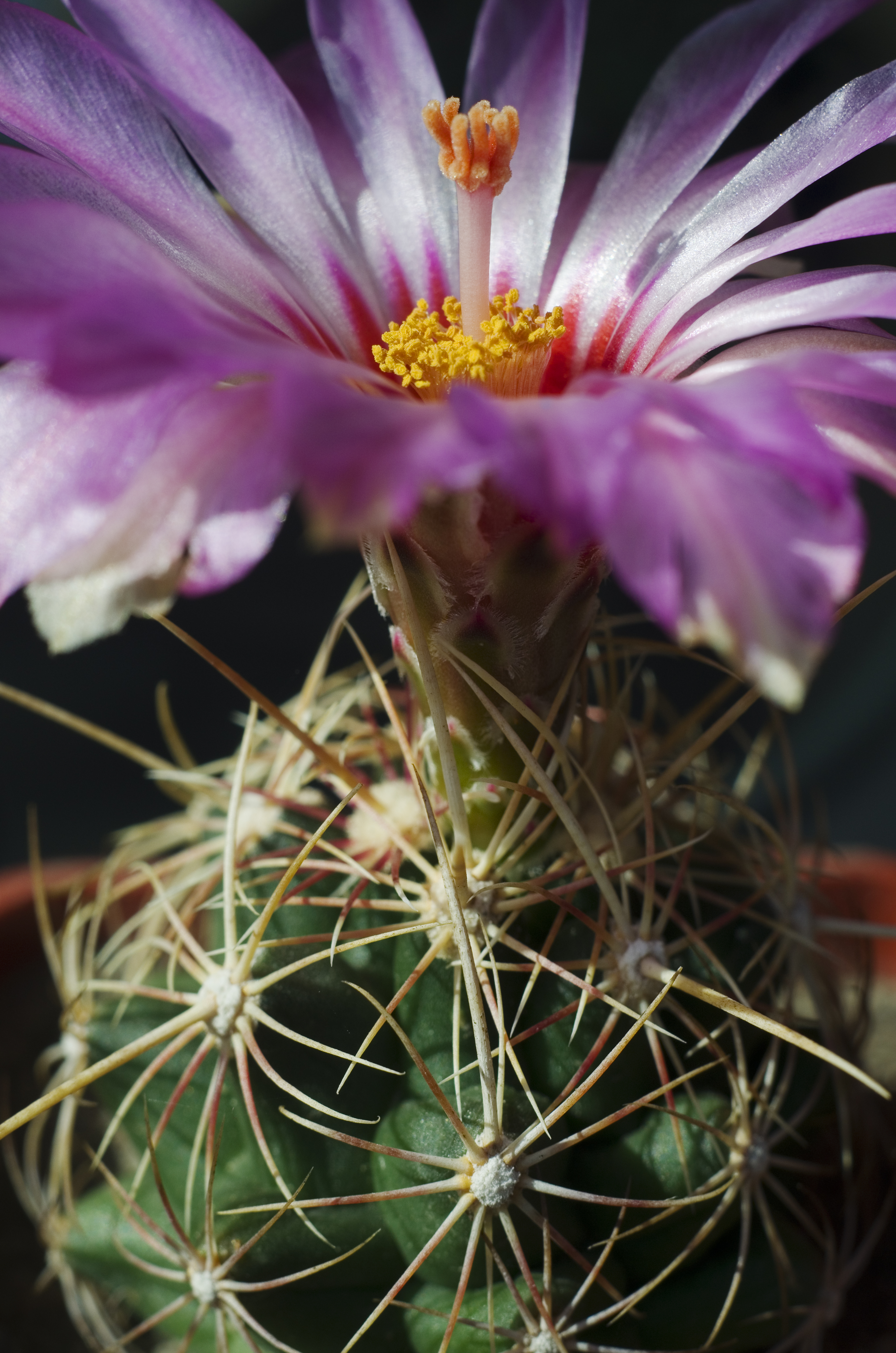
Thelocactus bicolor

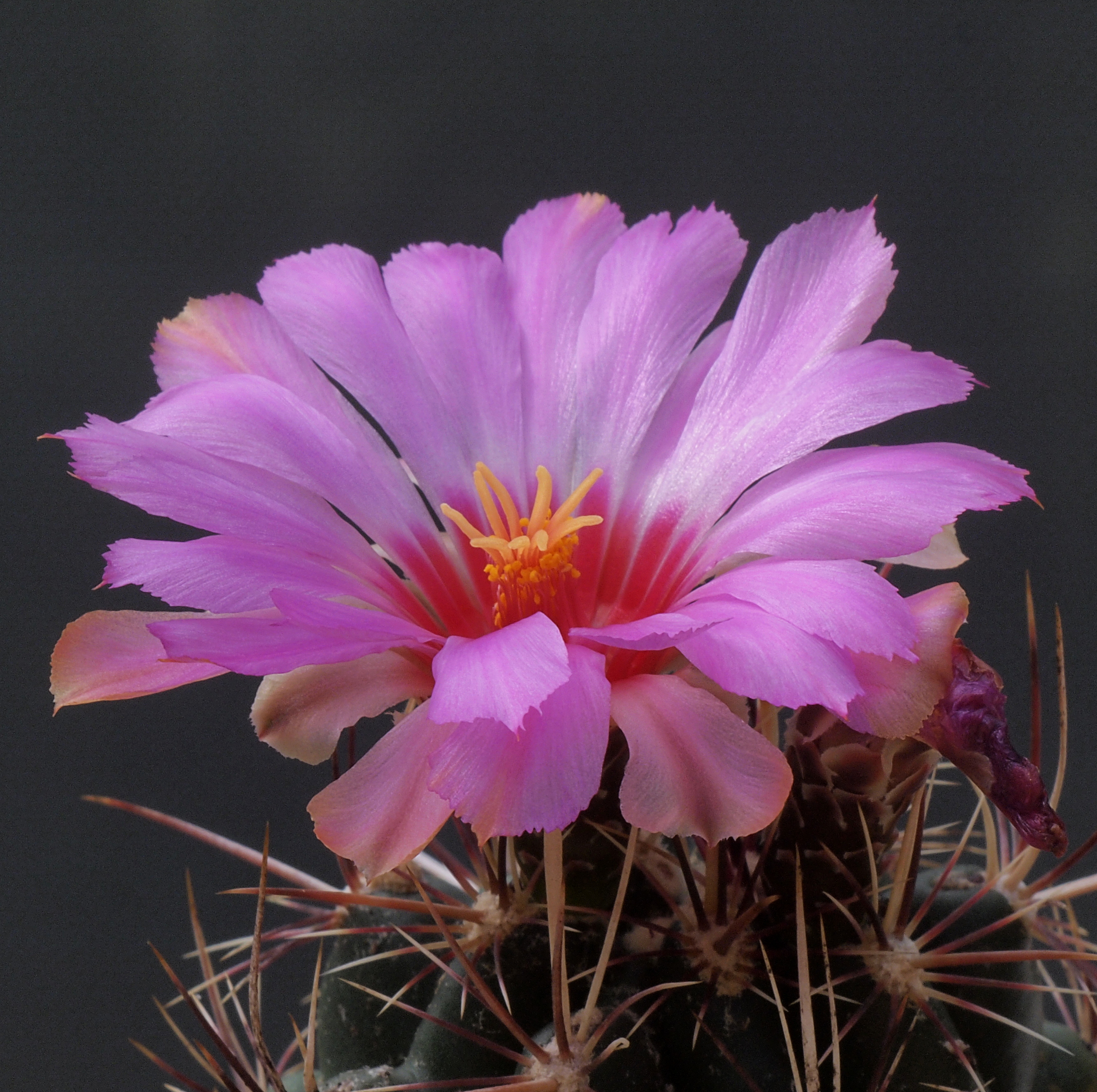
Thelocactus bicolor v. tanquecillos

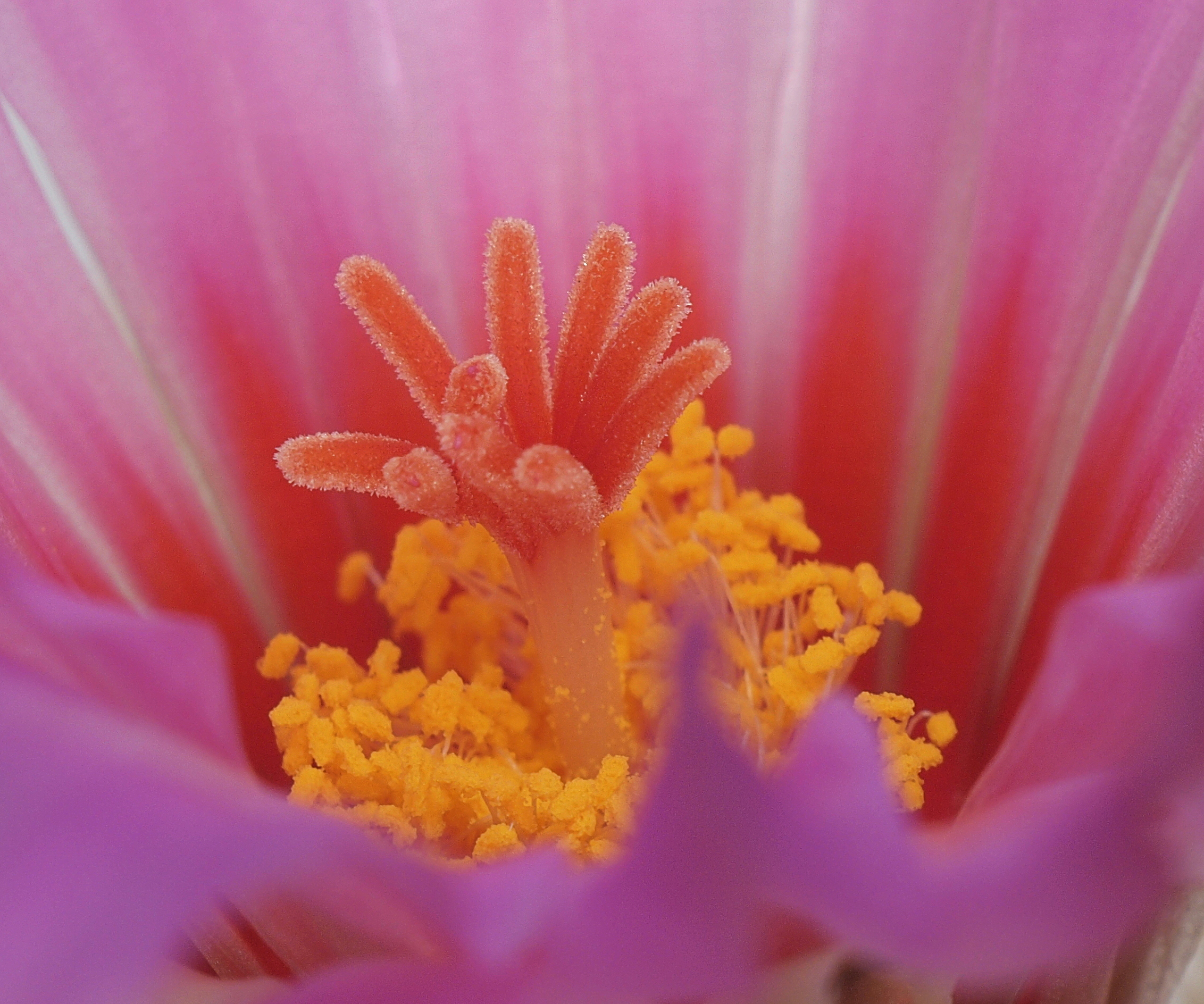
Pistil and stamens

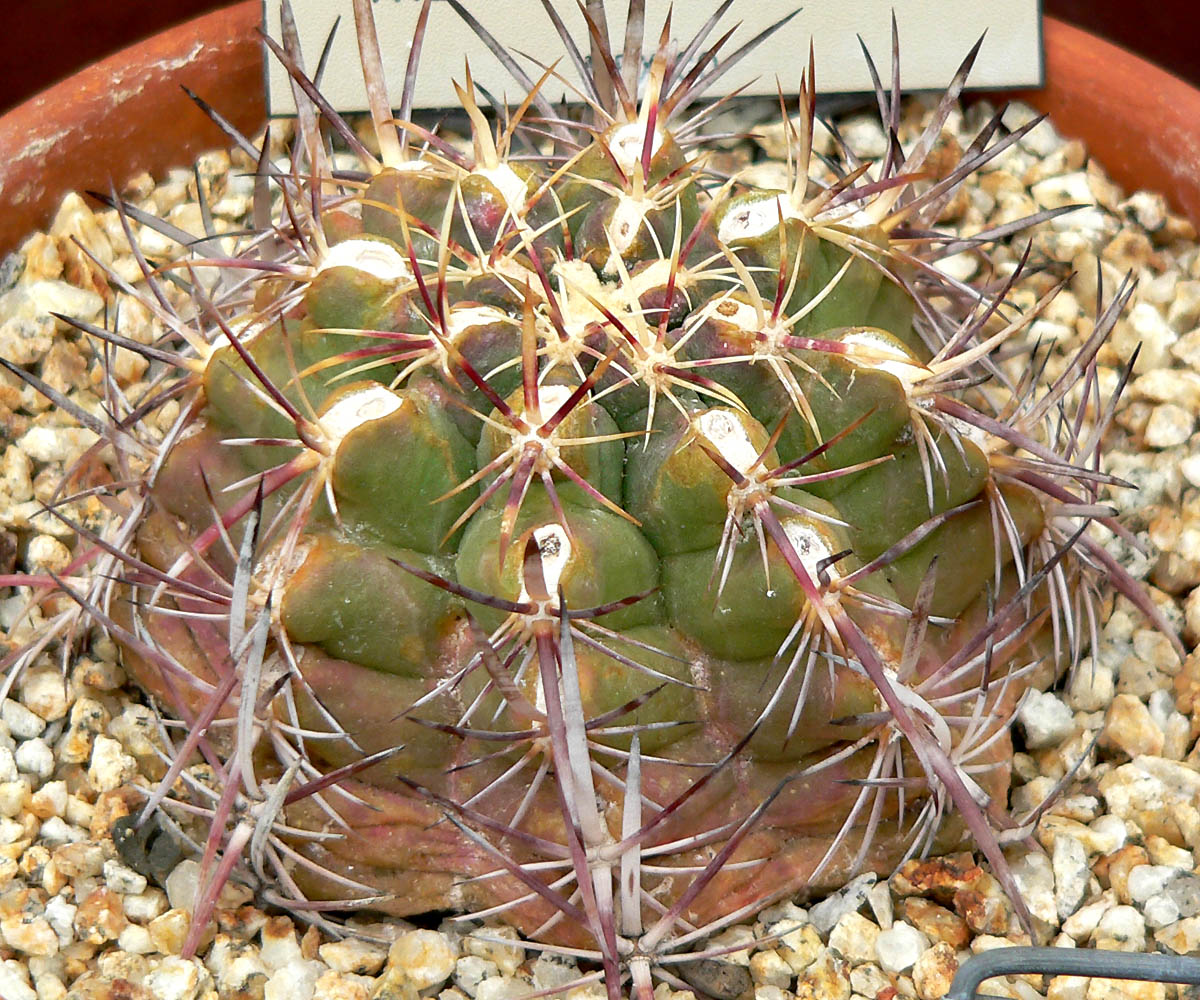
Thelocactus bicolor
