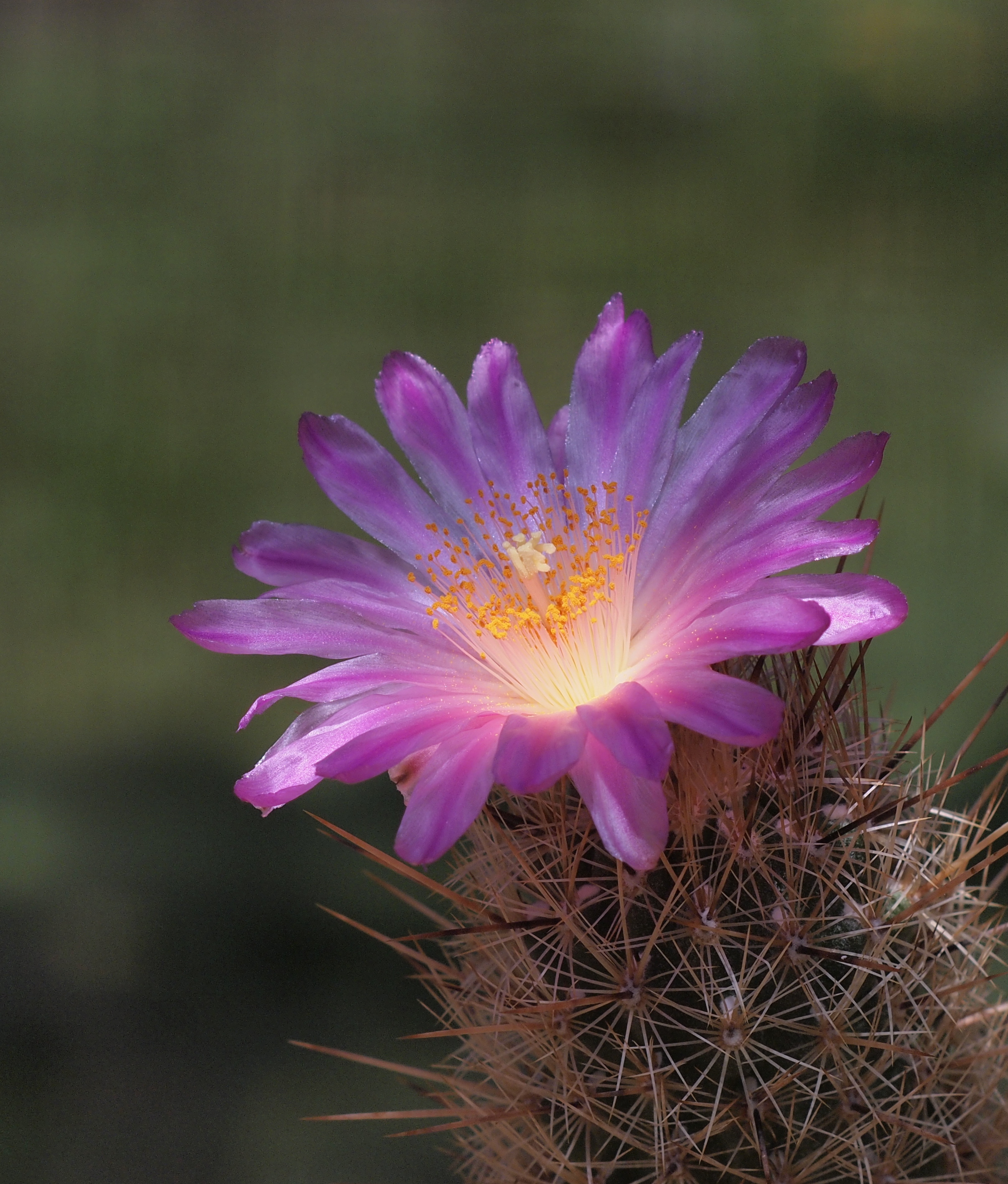

Conservation status
- Endangered (IUCN 3.1)

Scientific classification
- Kingdom: Plantae
- Clade: Tracheophytes
- Clade: Angiosperms
- Clade: Eudicots
- Order: Caryophyllales
- Family: Cactaceae
- Subfamily: Cactoideae
- Genus: Thelocactus
- Species: T. hastifer

Binomial name
- Thelocactus hastifer (Werderm. & Boed.) F.M.Knuth

Synonyms
- Echinocactus hastifer Werderm. & Boed. 1931; Ferocactus hastifer (Werderm. & Boed.) N.P.Taylor 1979

= Thelocactus hastifer =

Species of cactus

Thelocactus hastifer is a species of plant in the family Cactaceae. It is endemic to Mexico. Its natural habitat is hot deserts.

== Description ==
Thelocactus hastifer is a cactus species that typically grows alone, featuring cylindrical, yellowish-green shoots that can reach heights of 10 to 30 centimeters and diameters of 2 to 2.5 centimeters. Its 12 to 18 ribs are characterized by vertically elongated cusps, measuring 10 to 13 millimeters in length, 4 to 5 millimeters in width, and 4 to 6 millimeters in height. The areoles, which are small, cushion-like structures on the cactus from which spines or flowers grow, have a diameter of 4 to 5 millimeters and may contain extra floral nectaries. The plant typically bears 4 to 5 white to yellowish-brown straight central spines, ranging from 10 to 14 millimeters in length (occasionally up to 26 millimeters), as well as 20 to 25 straight whitish radial spines, measuring 12 to 15 millimeters long.

The magenta flowers of Thelocactus hastifer are 2.5 to 3 centimeters long and 3.5 to 5 centimeters in diameter. Its greenish-purple fruits, which are dry when ripe, crack open with a basal pore. These fruits are 8 to 14 millimeters long and have a diameter of 7 to 11 millimeters. Inside, they contain seeds that measure 1.7 to 2.1 x 0.5 to 1.1 millimeters.

== Distribution ==
This species is native to the Mexican states of Hidalgo and Querétaro, where it can be found at altitudes of 1800 to 2000 meters. The plant grows in rock crevices on limestone hills.

== Taxonomy ==
Thelocactus hastifer was first described as Echinocactus hastifer in 1931 by Erich Werdermann and Friedrich Bödeker. The specific epithet "hastifer" is derived from the Latin words "hasta" for 'spear' and "-fer" for '-bearing', referring to the spear-like appearance of its spines. In 1936, Frederik Marcus Knuth transferred the species to the genus Thelocactus.
