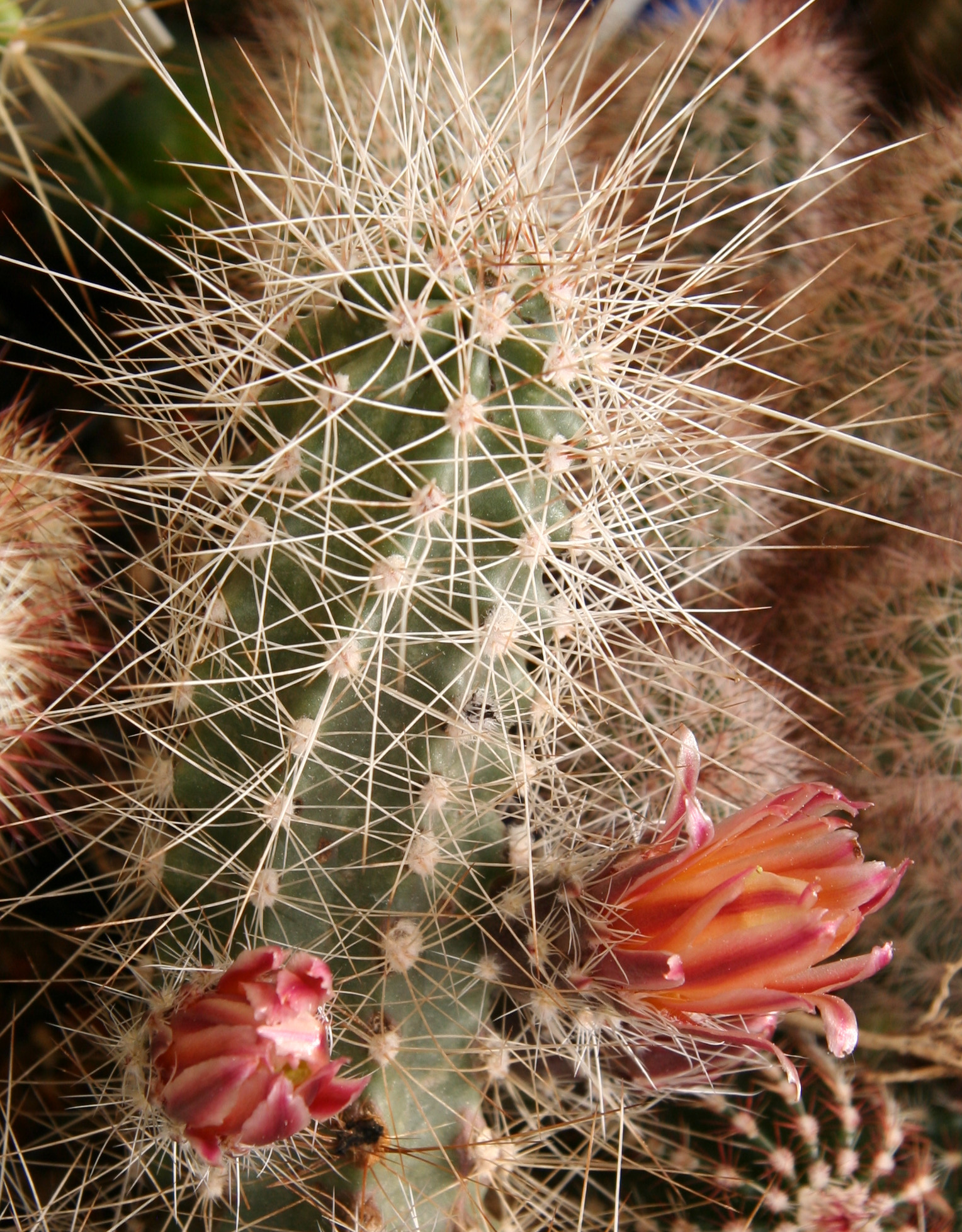

Conservation status
- Vulnerable (IUCN 3.1)

Scientific classification
- Kingdom: Plantae
- Clade: Tracheophytes
- Clade: Angiosperms
- Clade: Eudicots
- Order: Caryophyllales
- Family: Cactaceae
- Subfamily: Cactoideae
- Genus: Echinocereus
- Species: E. mapimiensis

Binomial name
- Echinocereus mapimiensis E.F.Anderson, W.C.Hodgs. & P.Quirk, 1998

= Echinocereus mapimiensis =

Species of cactus

Echinocereus mapimiensis is a species of cactus native to Mexico.

== Description ==
Echinocereus mapimiensis typically grows in loose clusters up to 60 cm (24 in) in diameter, consisting of up to 50 shoots. These blue-green, cylindrical, soft-fleshed shoots are mostly upright but may overhang with age and shrink in dry conditions. They range from 4 to 30 cm (1.6 to 11.8 in) in length and 1.5 to 3.5 cm (0.59 to 1.38 in) in diameter (rarely up to 8 cm (3.1 in)). The shoots are barely obscured by spines and usually have six blunt, low-humped ribs with circular white areoles. The straight, needle-like spines are blackish or deep red, turning gray or whitish with age, making it hard to distinguish between central and radial spines. The central spines, 1.5 to 2.2 cm (0.59 to 0.87 in) long, spread out in groups of two to four, while the radial spines, 0.9 to 1.8 cm (0.35 to 0.71 in) long, spread out in groups of four to eight.

The funnel-shaped flowers are brownish magenta, appearing on the sides of the shoots. They are 3 to 4.5 cm (1.2 to 1.8 in) long (occasionally up to 5.5 cm (2.2 in)) and 1.7 to 4 cm (0.67 to 1.57 in) in diameter, with cream-colored edged bracts. The green fruits are spherical to egg-shaped, 1.5 to 2.1 cm (0.59 to 0.83 in) long, and 1.2 to 1.5 cm (0.47 to 0.59 in) in diameter.

== Distribution ==
Echinocereus mapimiensis is found among shrubs on loamy-sandy alluvial soils in Coahuila, Mexico, within the Mapimi Desert near Bolson de Mapimi, at elevations around 366 meters. Plants are found growing around Grusonia bradtiana, Coryphantha poselgeriana v. valida, Echinocactus horizonthalonius, Thelocactus bicolor, Epithelantha micromeris, Dasylirion longissimum, Mammillaria pottsii, Pelecyphora duncanii, Ibervillea sonorae and Pelecyphora macromeris subsp. runyonii.

== Taxonomy ==
First described by Edward Frederick Anderson, Wendy C. Hodgson, and Patrick Quirk in 1998, the species name "mapimiensis" refers to its occurrence in the Mexican Mapimi Desert.
