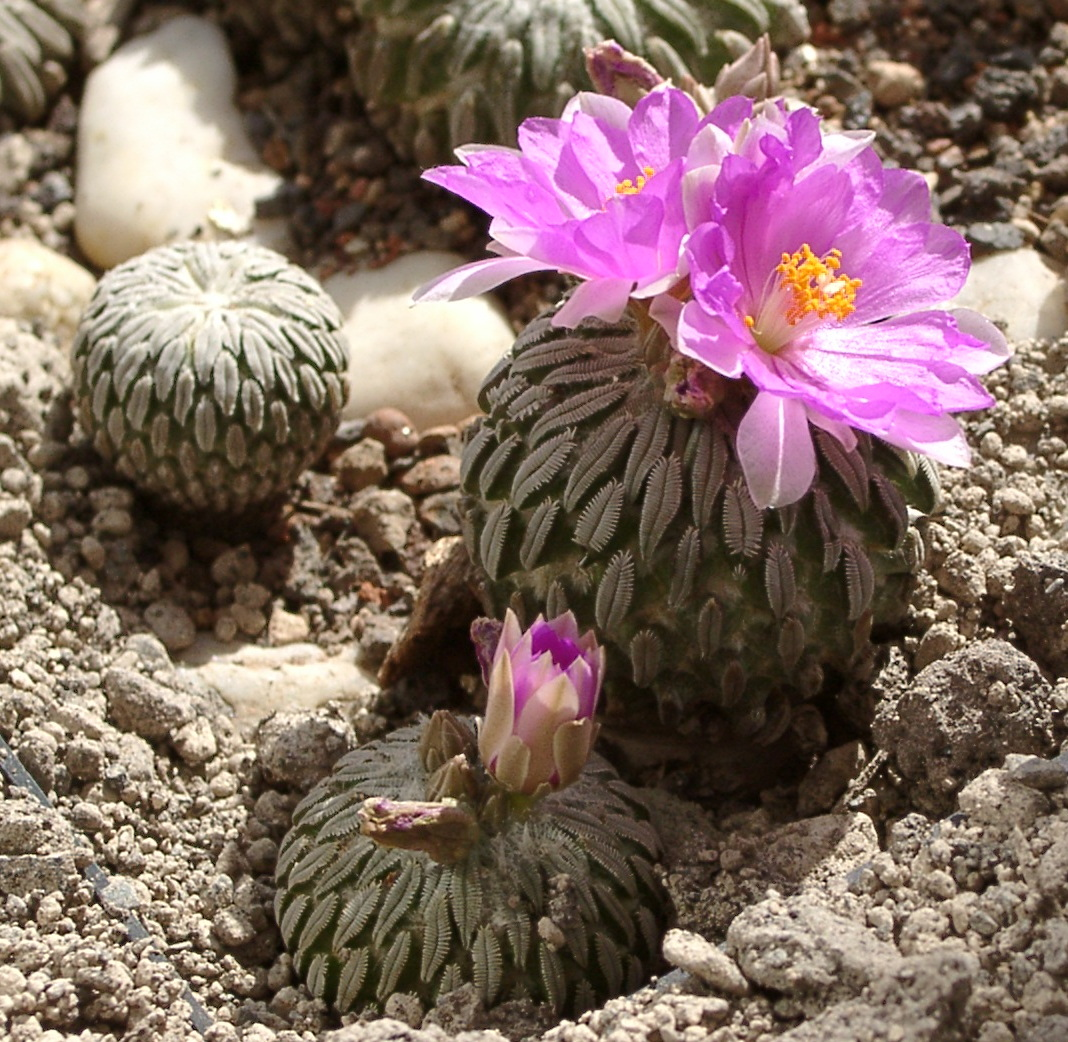

Conservation status
- Least Concern (IUCN 3.1)

Scientific classification
- Kingdom: Plantae
- Clade: Tracheophytes
- Clade: Angiosperms
- Clade: Eudicots
- Order: Caryophyllales
- Family: Cactaceae
- Subfamily: Cactoideae
- Genus: Pelecyphora
- Species: P. aselliformis

Binomial name
- Pelecyphora aselliformis C.Ehrenb.

Synonyms
- Ariocarpus aselliformis (Ehrenb.) F.A.C.Weber 1898; Mammillaria aselliformis (Ehrenb.) H.P.Kelsey & Dayton 1942; Pelecyphora aselliformis var. concolor Hook.f. 1873

= Pelecyphora aselliformis =

Species of cactus

Pelecyphora aselliformis is a species of Pelecyphora found in Mexico.

== Description ==
Pelecyphora aselliformis grows with globose, spherical or flattened spherical grayish green stems, with fleshy roots that are 2 to 7 centimeters in diameter and about 12 cm high. Their hatchet-shaped tubercles are 2 to 4 millimeters high, 5 to 9 millimeters long and 1 to 2.5 millimeters wide. Its outer part is flattened and the outline is elliptical. The areoles are woolly, 40 to 60 stiff, whitish spines are arranged in a striking comb-like manner and are 0.7 to 4 millimeters long. The magenta-colored flowers appear at the apex, between the wooliness of the young areole reach diameters of 1.3 to 3.5 centimeters.

It grows very slowly and flowers only after many years.

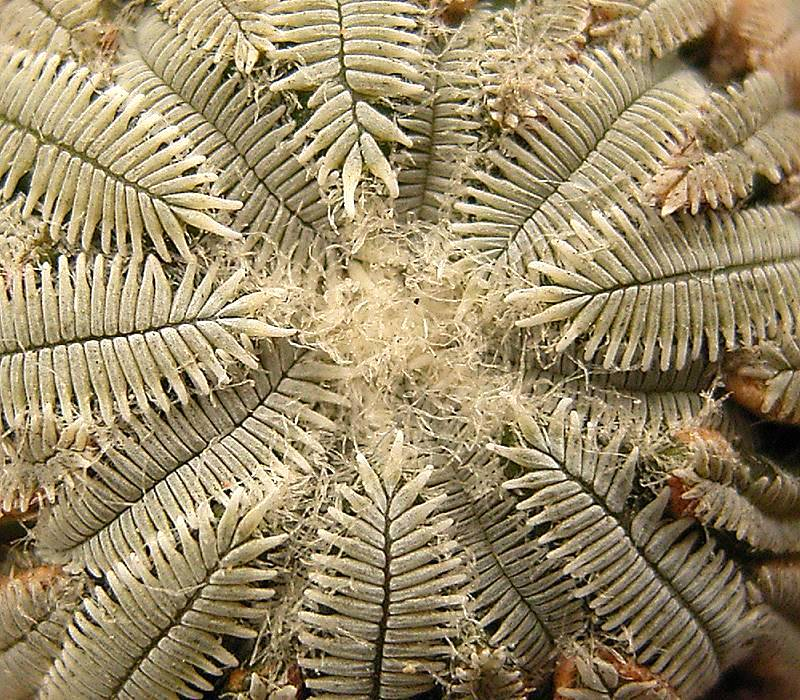

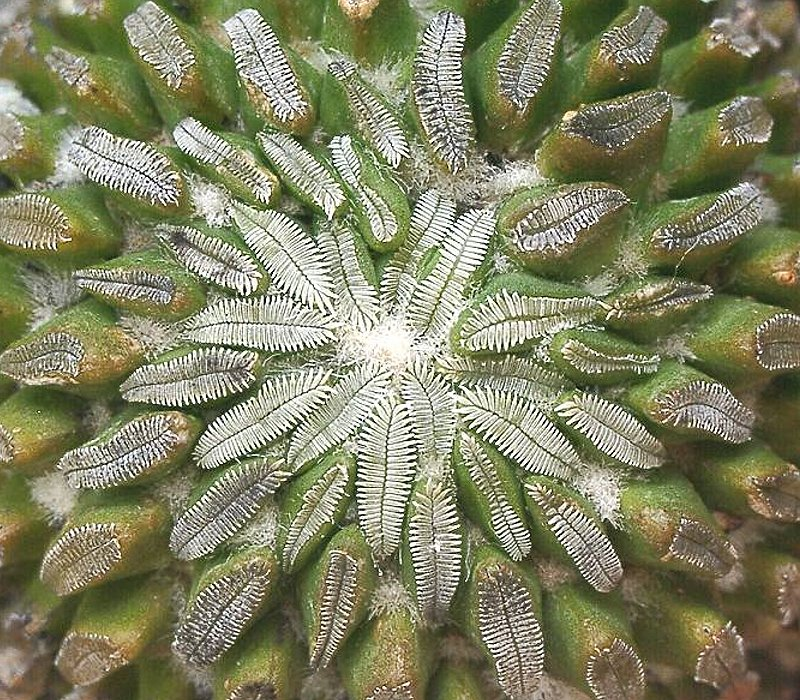

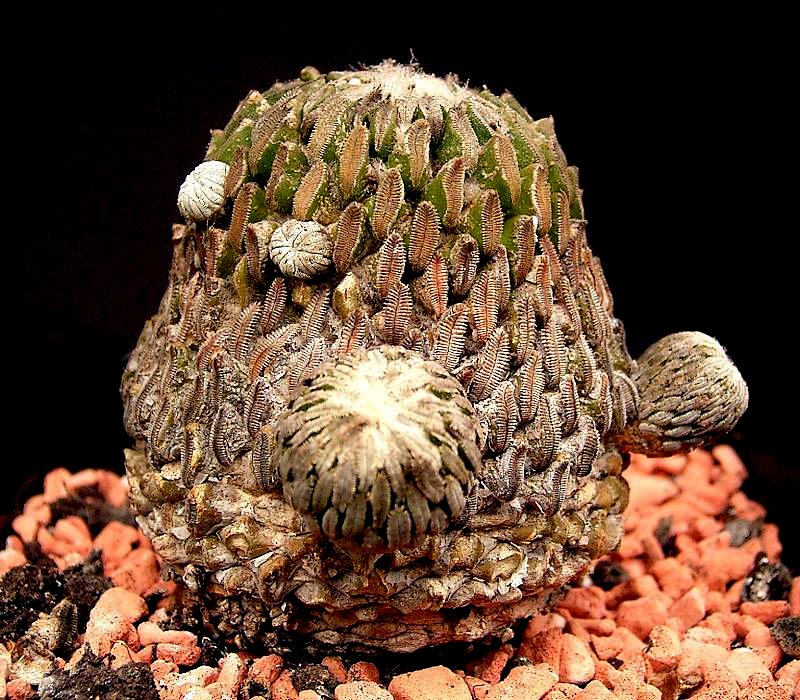

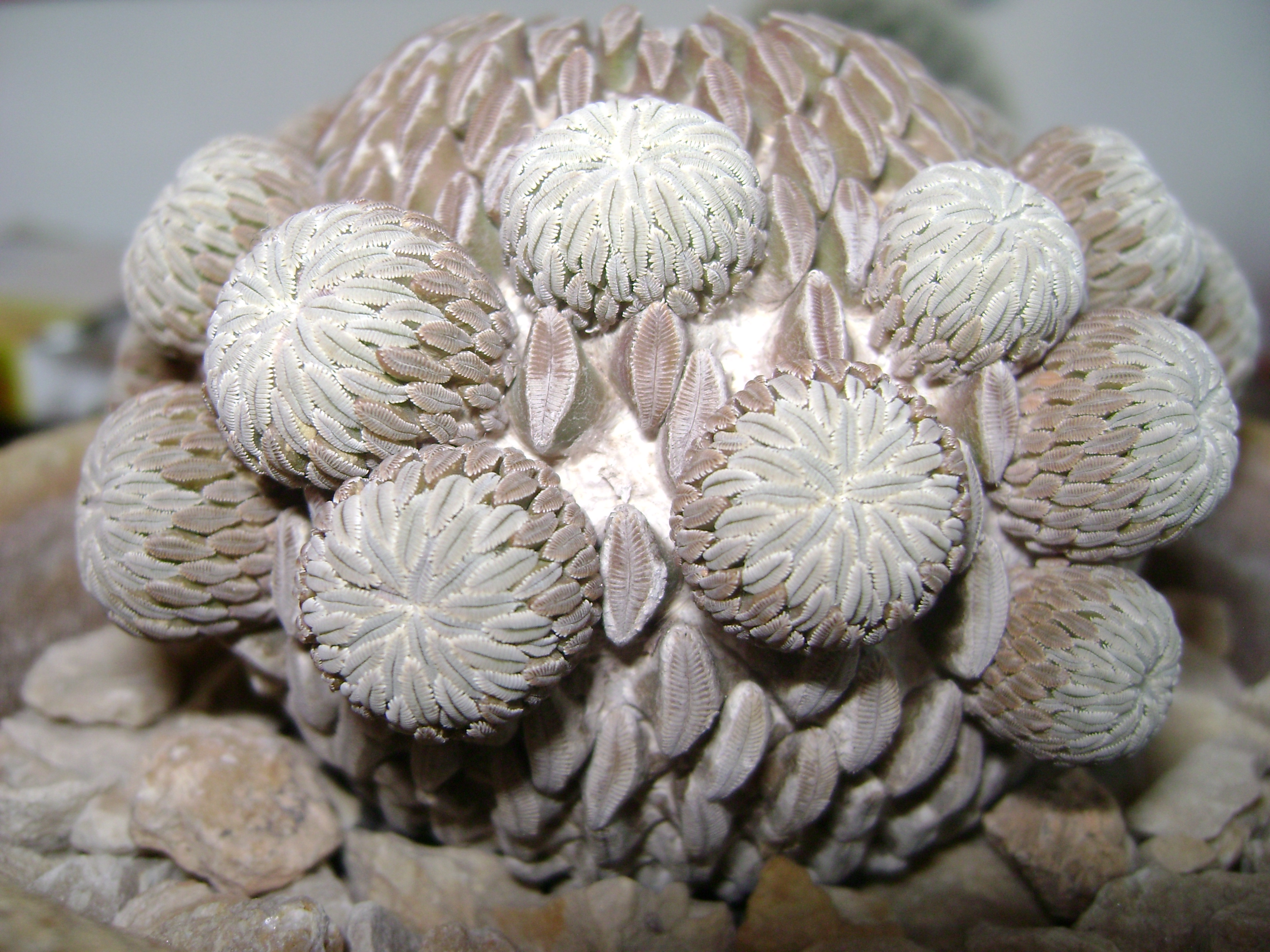

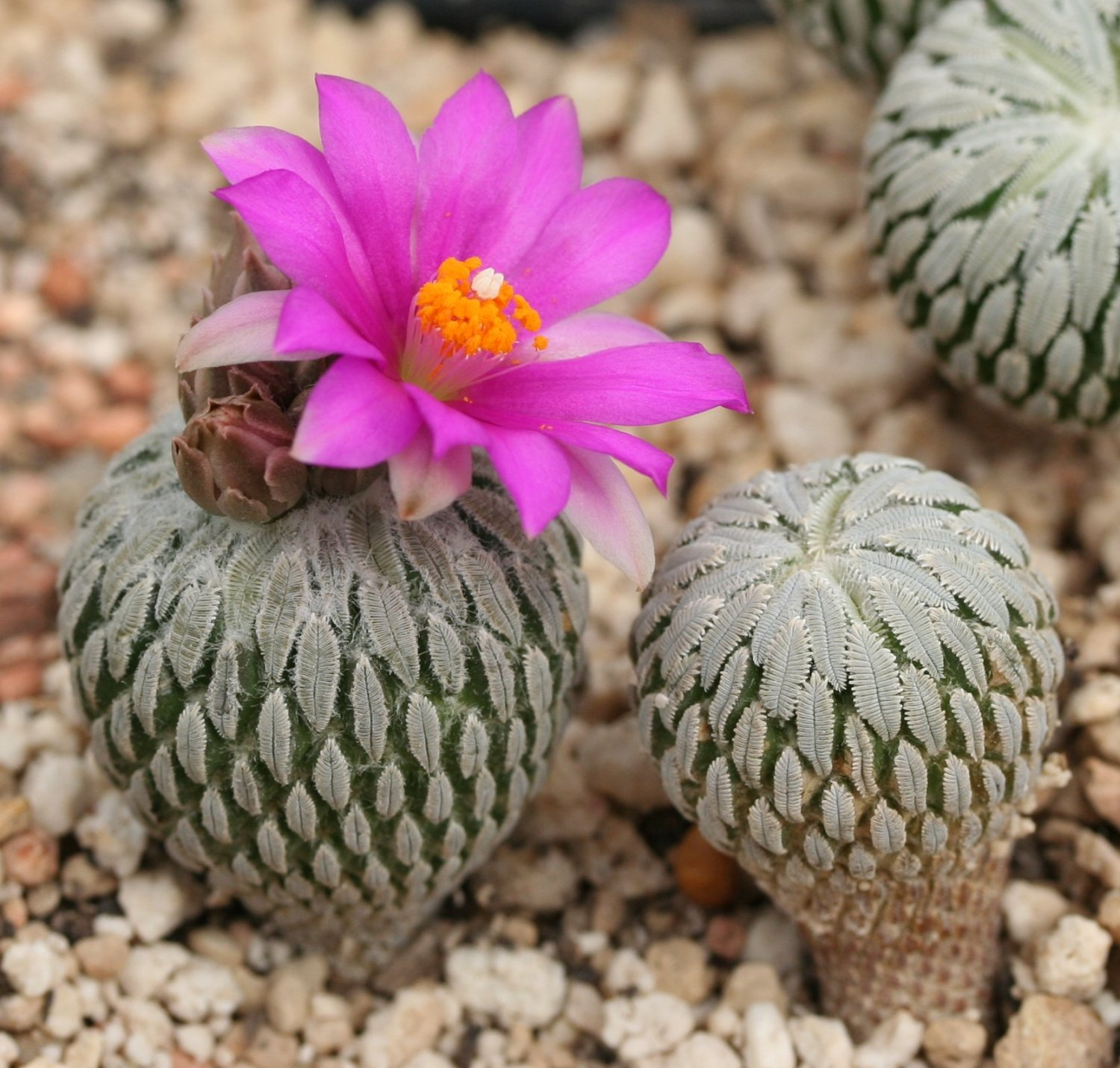

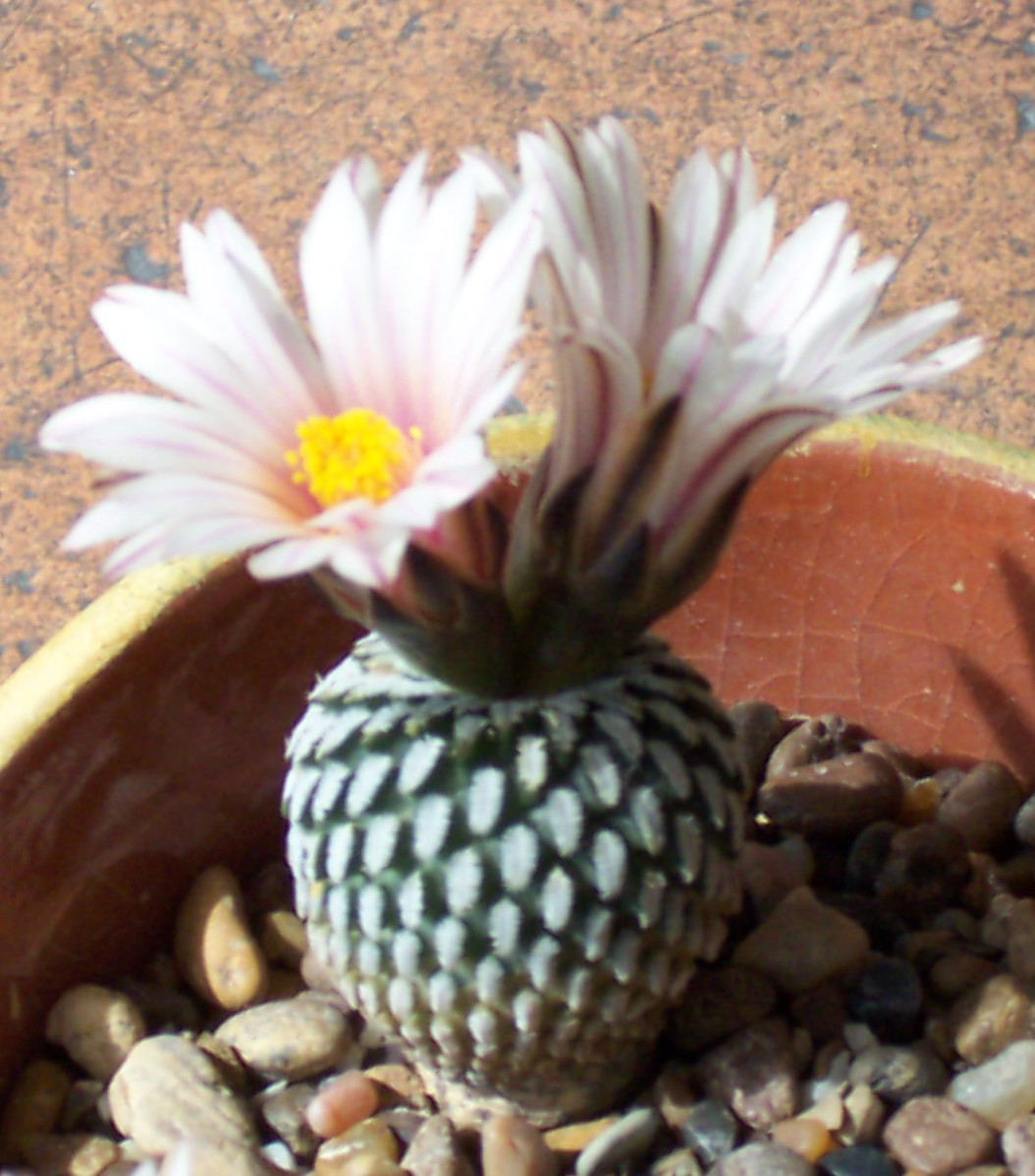

== Distribution ==
Pelecyphora aselliformis is widespread in the Mexican state of San Luis Potosí. It inhabits low hills and flat plains at elevations of 1800 to 2400 meters and grows on nutrient-rich, dark soils and limestone rocks. The range extends over an area of no more than 500 km^{2}.

== Taxonomy ==
The first description was made in 1843 by Carl August Ehrenberg. The specific epithet aselliformis means 'woodlouse-shaped'. Common names are “Peoti”, “Peotillo”, “Peyote” and “Peyotillo”.

When a new highway was built north of the city of San Luis Potosí that passed through a population of Pelecyphora aselliformis, 1226 specimens of the species were relocated to the El Charco del Ingenio Botanical Garden near San Miguel de Allende.
