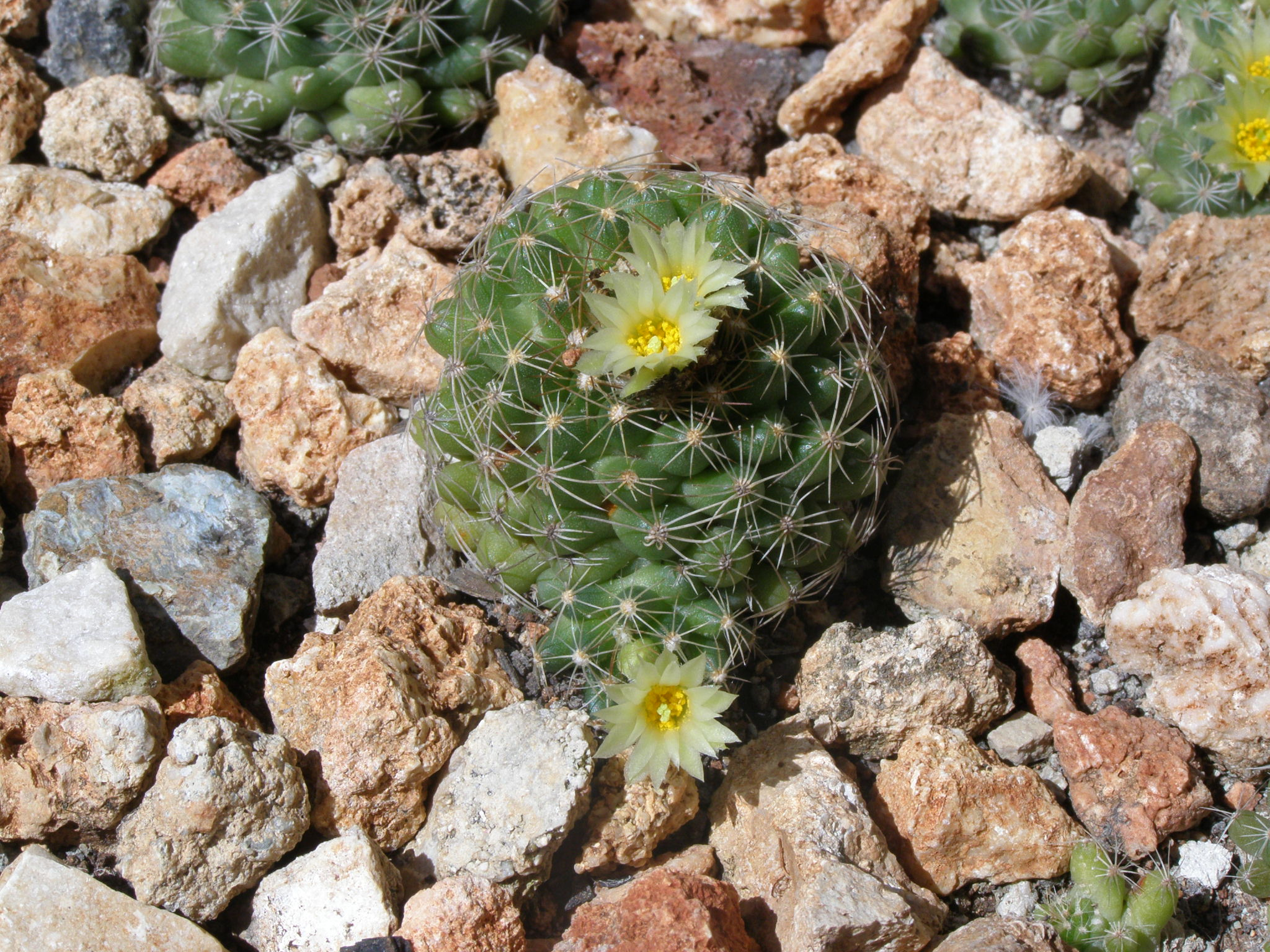

Conservation status
- Endangered (IUCN 3.1)

Scientific classification
- Kingdom: Plantae
- Clade: Tracheophytes
- Clade: Angiosperms
- Clade: Eudicots
- Order: Caryophyllales
- Family: Cactaceae
- Subfamily: Cactoideae
- Genus: Pelecyphora
- Species: P. cubensis

Binomial name
- Pelecyphora cubensis (Britton & Rose) D.Aquino & Dan.Sánchez

= Pelecyphora cubensis =

Species of cactus

Pelecyphora cubensis is a species of flowering plant in the family Cactaceae, native to Cuba.

== Description ==
Pelecyphora cubensis grows solitary and remains small. The spherical to depressed spherical shoots reach heights of 1 to 3 centimeters and diameters of 2 to 3 centimeters. Their 6 to 7 millimeters long warts are only furrowed along half their length. Central spines are usually not present. The ten to 15 white, finely downy marginal spines are radiating. They are 3 to 4 millimeters long.

The flowers are light yellowish green. They are 1.6 centimeters long and reach a diameter of 1.2 to 1.6 centimeters. The red fruits are shorter than 10 millimeters.

== Distribution ==
Pelecyphora cubensis is found in the Holguín province of Cuba.

== Taxonomy ==
The first description as Coryphantha cubensis by Nathaniel Lord Britton and Joseph Nelson Rose was published in 1912. The specific epithet cubensis refers to the occurrence of the species in Cuba. David Richard Hunt placed the species in the genus Escobaria in 1978. David Aquino & Daniel Sánchez moved the species to Pelecyphora based on phylogenetic studies in 2022. Nomenclature synonyms include Neobesseya cubensis (Britton & Rose) Hester (1941) and Neolloydia cubensis (Britton & Rose) Backeb. (1942).
