= Pelecyphora abdita =

Scientific classification
- Kingdom: Plantae
- Clade: Tracheophytes
- Clade: Angiosperms
- Clade: Eudicots
- Order: Caryophyllales
- Family: Cactaceae
- Subfamily: Cactoideae
- Genus: Pelecyphora
- Species: P. abdita

Binomial name
- Pelecyphora abdita (Řepka & Vaško) D.Aquino & Dan.Sánchez

Synonyms
- Escobaria abdita Řepka & Vaško 2011 publ. 2012; Neobesseya abdita (Řepka & Vaško) Lodé 2013

Species of cactus

Pelecyphora abdita is a species of flowering plant in the family Cactaceae, native to the Mexico.

== Description ==
Pelecyphora abdita grows up to 25 millimeters and 20 millimeters in diameter and forms clumps with a slightly branched beet shaped tap root. There are 11 to 15 spines that are white, 3.5–5 millimeters long. The flower is 35-45 mm long, whitish-pinkish with pink stripes on tepals, 30–35 mm in diameter. The red fruits are obovoid 5–7 mm long and grey green to brown green.

=== Subspecies ===
Accepted subspecies:

- Pelecyphora abdita subsp. abdita
- Pelecyphora abdita subsp. tenuispina (Perez Badillo, Delladdio & Raya Sanchez) D.Aquino & Dan.Sánchez

== Distribution ==
The plant is found south of El Oro in Coahuila, Mexico at elevations of 1100 meters.

== Taxonomy ==
The species was discovered in 2011 and described under the name Escobaria abdita. It was named after the word “abdita, abditus” meaning hidden, secret in reference to the hidden life of this species.
