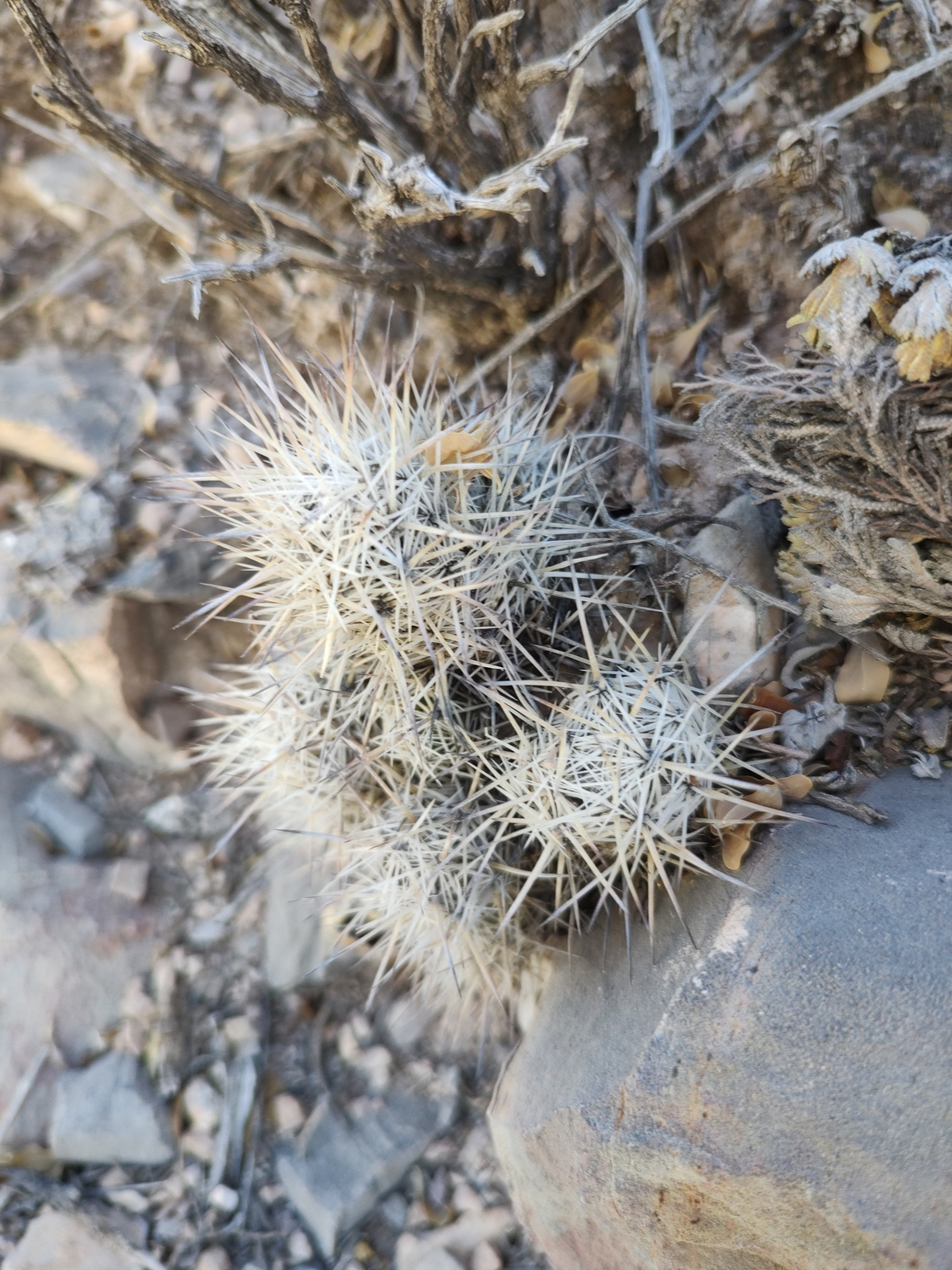

Scientific classification
- Kingdom: Plantae
- Clade: Tracheophytes
- Clade: Angiosperms
- Clade: Eudicots
- Order: Caryophyllales
- Family: Cactaceae
- Subfamily: Cactoideae
- Genus: Pelecyphora
- Species: P. lloydii

Binomial name
- Pelecyphora lloydii (Britton & Rose) D.Aquino & Dan.Sánchez

Synonyms
- Coryphantha lloydii (Britton & Rose) Fosberg 1931; Escobaria lloydii Britton & Rose 1923; Neobesseya lloydii (Britton & Rose) Lodé 2013

= Pelecyphora lloydii =

Species of cactus

Pelecyphora lloydii is a species of flowering plant in the family Cactaceae, native to Mexico.

== Description ==
Pelecyphora lloydii grows with several shoots and often forms cushions. There are corked bald warts on the shoots. The several strong central spines are up to 2 centimeters long. Its approximately 20 slender and radiating marginal spines are white.

The greenish flowers are up to 2.5 centimeters long. The red, spherical fruits are 6 to 12 millimeters long.

== Distribution ==
Pelecyphora lloydii is widespread in the Mexican state of Zacatecas.

== Taxonomy ==
The first description by Nathaniel Lord Britton and Joseph Nelson Rose was published in 1923. The specific epithet lloydii honors the British cytologist Francis Ernest Lloyd (1868–1947). David Aquino & Daniel Sánchez moved the species to Pelecyphora based on phylogenetic studies in 2022. Nomenclature synonyms are Coryphantha lloydii (Britton & Rose) Fosberg (1931), Neobesseya lloydii (Britton & Rose) Lodé (2013) and Escobaria lloydii Britton & Rose (1923).
