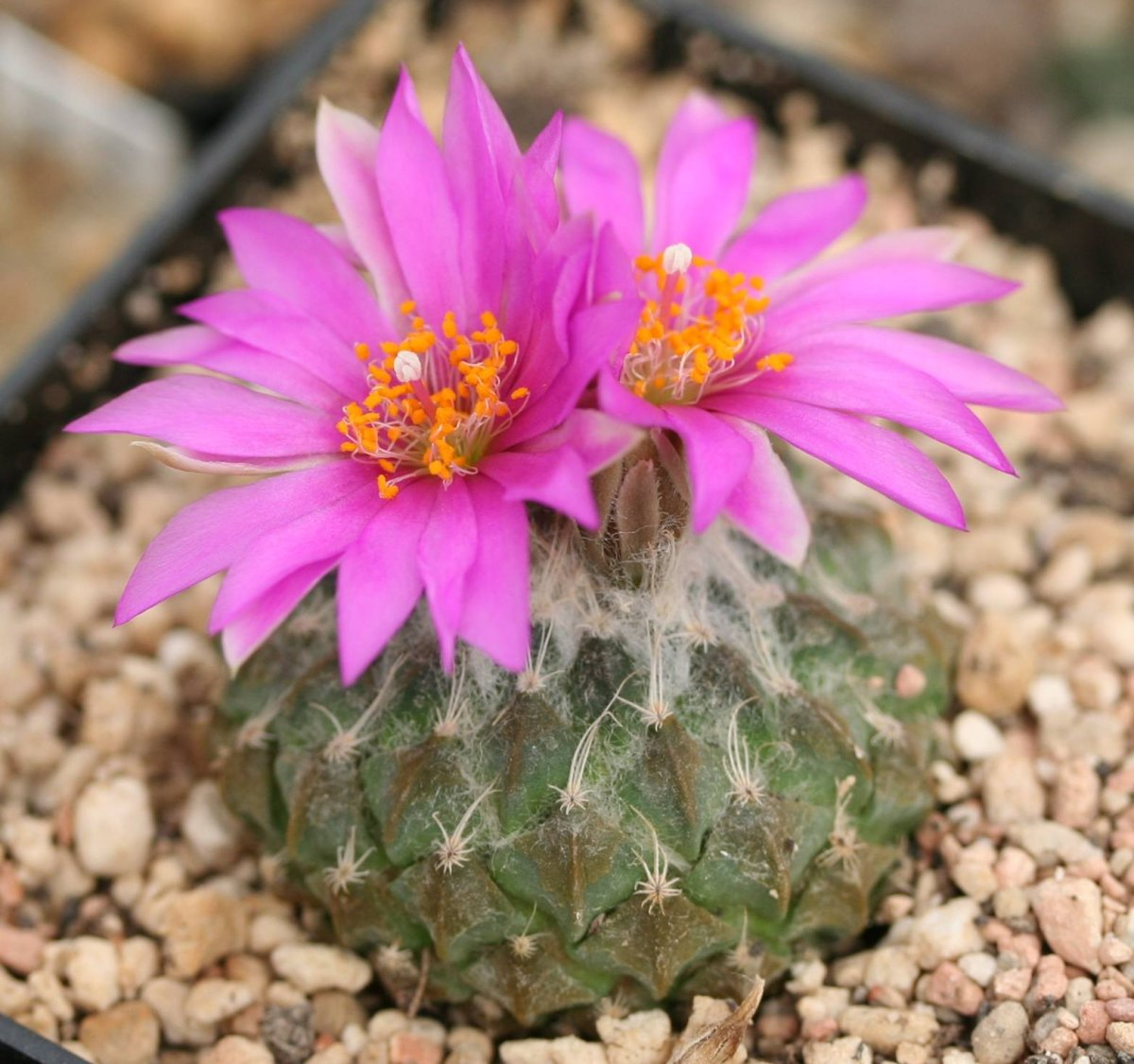
- Pelecyphora strobiliformis

Scientific classification
- Kingdom: Plantae
- Clade: Tracheophytes
- Clade: Angiosperms
- Clade: Eudicots
- Order: Caryophyllales
- Family: Cactaceae
- Subfamily: Cactoideae
- Tribe: Cacteae
- Genus: Pelecyphora; C.Ehrenb.

Type species
- Pelecyphora aselliformis

Species
- See text

Synonyms
- Cochiseia W.H.Earle; Escobesseya Hester; Fobea Fric (nom. inval.); Neobesseya Britton & Rose; Escobaria Britton & Rose

= Pelecyphora =

Genus of cacti

Pelecyphora, pincushion cactus or foxtail cactus is a genus of cacti, comprising 20 species. They originate from Mexico and the United States.

Common species include the Missouri foxtail cactus P. missouriensis, widespread in grassland and forest west of the Mississippi, and the spinystar P. vivipara, distributed across the US and into Canada, first described by Nuttall in 1813.

== Description ==
Pelecyphores are spherical to club-shaped stem succulents up to 6 cm (2.4 in) in diameter and gray-green in color. They branch only sparsely and only at an older age. The areoles standing on the longitudinally or transversely flattened warts have thorns in a pectinate (comb-shaped) arrangement. As we age, the thorns, then the areoles and finally the warts fall off. Between the warts, the plant bodies are initially dense and short-haired, so that the apexes are hidden.

The flowers arise individually from short furrows on the upper surfaces of the youngest areoles. They are bright purple and about 3 cm (1.2 in) long. The greenish fruits that form after the flowers are fertilized dry out when ripe and release the black seeds into the crown wool, from which they are only washed out (in nature) after a long time.

== Taxonomy ==
Species accepted As of January 2026 by Plants of the World Online with sections from Nigel Paul Taylor from 1986:

Section	Group	Image	Scientific name	Subspecies	Distribution
Pelecyphora			Pelecyphora aselliformis C.Ehrenb.		San Luis Potosi, Mexico
Pelecyphora			Pelecyphora strobiliformis (Werderm.) Frič & Schelle ex Kreutz		Nuevo Leon, San Luis Potosi, Tamaulipas states in Mexico
Pleurantha N.P.Taylor			Pelecyphora chihuahuensis (Britton & Rose) D.Aquino & Dan.Sánchez	Pelecyphora chihuahuensis subsp. chihuahuensis; Pelecyphora chihuahuensis subsp. henricksonii (Glass & R.A.Foster) D.Aquino & Dan.Sánchez	Mexico
Pleurantha N.P.Taylor			Pelecyphora tuberculosa (Engelm.) D.Aquino & Dan.Sánchez		New Mexico, Mexico
Escobaria Britton & Rose	Sneedii Group		Pelecyphora laredoi (Glass & R.A.Foster) D.Aquino & Dan.Sánchez		Coahuila de Zaragoza - Mexico
Escobaria Britton & Rose	Sneedii Group		Pelecyphora sneedii (Britton & Rose) D.Aquino & Dan.Sánchez	Pelecyphora sneedii subsp. sneedii; Pelecyphora sneedii subsp. orcuttii (Boed.) D.Aquino & Dan.Sánchez	Mexico (Chihuahua), United States (Arizona, New Mexico, Texas)
Escobaria Britton & Rose	Vivipara Group		Pelecyphora alversonii (J.M.Coult.) D.Aquino & Dan.Sánchez		Arizona, California
Escobaria Britton & Rose	Vivipara Group		Pelecyphora chlorantha (Engelm.) Stock		Arizona, California, Nevada, Utah
Escobaria Britton & Rose	Vivipara Group		Pelecyphora hesteri (Y.Wright) D.Aquino & Dan.Sánchez	Pelecyphora hesteri subsp. grata (M.Kaplan, Kunte & Šnicer) D.Aquino & Dan.Sánchez; Pelecyphora hesteri subsp. hesteri	Texas
Escobaria Britton & Rose	Vivipara Group		Pelecyphora vivipara (Nutt.) D.Aquino & Dan.Sánchez		Canada (Alberta, Manitoba, Saskatchewan ), Mexico (Chihuahua, Coahuila de Zaragoza, Sonora), United States (Arizona, California, Colorado, Kansas, Minnesota, Montana, Nebraska, Nevada, New Mexico, North Dakota, Oklahoma, South Dakota, Texas, Utah, Wyoming)
Neobesseya (Britton & Rose) N.P.Taylor			Pelecyphora abdita (Řepka & Vaško) D.Aquino & Dan.Sánchez	Pelecyphora abdita subsp. abdita; Pelecyphora abdita subsp. tenuispina (Perez Badillo, Delladdio & Raya Sanchez) D.Aquino & Dan.Sánchez	Mexico (Coahuila)
Neobesseya (Britton & Rose) N.P.Taylor			Pelecyphora emskoetteriana (Quehl) D.Aquino & Dan.Sánchez		Mexico (Coahuila de Zaragoza, Tamaulipas ), United States (Texas)
Neobesseya (Britton & Rose) N.P.Taylor	Dasyacantha Group		Pelecyphora dasyacantha (Engelm.) D.Aquino & Dan.Sánchez	Pelecyphora dasyacantha subsp. dasyacantha; Pelecyphora dasyacantha subsp. chaffeyi (Britton & Rose) D.Aquino & Dan.Sánchez	Mexico (Chihuahua, Coahuila de Zaragoza, Zacatecas), USA (Texas, New Mexico)
Neobesseya (Britton & Rose) N.P.Taylor	Dasyacantha Group		Pelecyphora duncanii (Hester) D.Aquino & Dan.Sánchez		New Mexico, Texas
Neobesseya (Britton & Rose) N.P.Taylor	Dasyacantha Group		Pelecyphora lloydii (Britton & Rose) D.Aquino & Dan.Sánchez		Mexico (Zacatecas)
Neobesseya (Britton & Rose) N.P.Taylor	Dasyacantha Group		Pelecyphora minima (Baird) D.Aquino & Dan.Sánchez		Texas
Neobesseya (Britton & Rose) N.P.Taylor	Dasyacantha Group		Pelecyphora robbinsiorum (W.H.Earle) D.Aquino & Dan.Sánchez		Arizona
Neobesseya (Britton & Rose) N.P.Taylor	Missouriensis Group		Pelecyphora cubensis (Britton & Rose) D.Aquino & Dan.Sánchez		Cuba
Neobesseya (Britton & Rose) N.P.Taylor	Missouriensis Group		Pelecyphora macromeris (Engelm.) D.Aquino & Dan.Sánchez	Pelecyphora macromeris subsp. macromeris; Pelecyphora macromeris subsp. runyonii (Britton & Rose) D.Aquino & Dan.Sánchez	S. New Mexico to W. Texas and NE. Mexico.
Neobesseya (Britton & Rose) N.P.Taylor	Missouriensis Group		Pelecyphora missouriensis (Sweet) D.Aquino & Dan.Sánchez	Pelecyphora missouriensis subsp. missouriensis; Pelecyphora missouriensis subsp. asperispina (Boed.) D.Aquino & Dan.Sánchez	USA ( Arizona, Idaho, Kansas, New Mexico, North Dakota), Mexico (Coahuila de Zaragoza, Nuevo Leon)
Neobesseya (Britton & Rose) N.P.Taylor	Missouriensis Group		Pelecyphora zilziana (Boed.) D.Aquino & Dan.Sánchez		Mexico (Coahuila de Zaragoza)

== Synonymy ==
At genus level

- The genus Encephalocarpus A.Berger has been brought into synonymy with Pelecyphora.

At species level

The following are synonyms of species now placed outside of Pelecyphora:

- Pelecyphora aselliformis var. pectinata (= Mammillaria pectinifera)
- Pelecyphora pectinata (= Mammillaria pectinifera)
- Pelecyphora pseudopectinata (= Turbinicarpus pseudopectinatus)
- Pelecyphora valdeziana (= Turbinicarpus valdezianus)
- Pelecyphora plumosa (= Turbinicarpus valdezianus)
- Pelecyphora pulcherrima (= Turbinicarpus pseudopectinatus)

== Psychoactivity ==
- Pelecyphora aselliformis: Mescaline (Less than 0.00002% in dry weight) Neal et al. 1972

== Conservation status ==
Both P. aselliformis and P. strobiliformis are classified as being of Least Concern on the IUCN Red List, however both species are contained in Appendix 1 of CITES species (Convention on International Trade in Endangered Species) as at June 2013.
