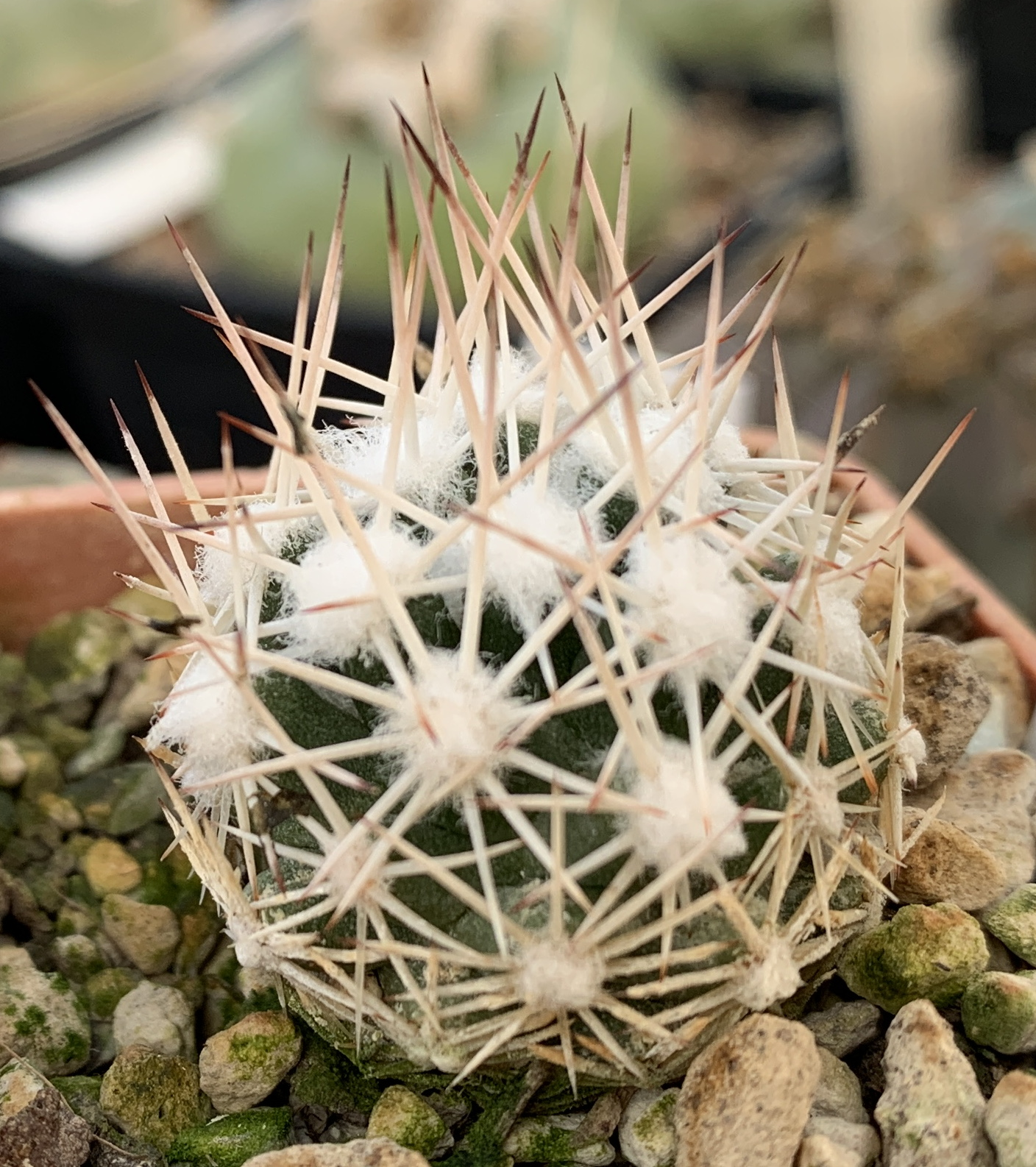

Conservation status
- Vulnerable (IUCN 3.1)

Scientific classification
- Kingdom: Plantae
- Clade: Tracheophytes
- Clade: Angiosperms
- Clade: Eudicots
- Order: Caryophyllales
- Family: Cactaceae
- Subfamily: Cactoideae
- Genus: Pelecyphora
- Species: P. robbinsiorum

Binomial name
- Pelecyphora robbinsiorum (W.H.Earle) D.Aquino & Dan.Sánchez

Synonyms
- List: Cochiseia robbinsiorum W.H.Earle 1976; Coryphantha robbinsiorum (W.H.Earle) Zimm. 1978; Escobaria robbinsiorum (W.H.Earle) D.R.Hunt 1978; Neobesseya robbinsiorum (W.H.Earle) Doweld 2000

= Pelecyphora robbinsiorum =

Species of cactus

Pelecyphora robbinsiorum known by the common names Cochise pincushion cactus and Cochise foxtail cactus is a species of flowering plant in the family Cactaceae.

== Description ==
This cactus lives mostly buried in the ground with only its top few centimeters exposed, reach heights of 2–6 centimeters and the same diameter. . There is a cluster of spines on each areole, surrounded by a tuft of white woolly hairs and tightly packed warts are 5–8 millimeters long. The spines are straight and white, often with dark tips, and measure 1–2 centimeters long. Central spines are usually not present. The 11–17 white marginal spines have a darker tip and are occasionally twisted, 0.3–1.8 centimeters long. The flower is 1–3 centimeters long and has greenish yellow tepals. The flowers are 1.8–2.0 centimeters long and reach a diameter of 1.2–1.5 centimeters. The orange-red, short cylindrical fruits are 6–8.5 millimeters long. The fruit is bright red to orange, succulent, and under a centimeter in length. The plant grows in nearly solid bedrock with little soil or sand, in full sunlight. It can be found in dense colonies of up to 1000 individuals.

== Distribution ==
It is native to southern Arizona in the United States, where it is known only from Cochise County, and northern Sonora in Mexico. There are scattered small occurrences on the north side of the border, and one known population to the south. Because of its rarity and a number of threats to remaining plants, the species was federally listed with a threatened status in 1986.

Threats to this plant include a prolonged drought in the region which is thought to have caused mortality. Drought conditions can also make the living cacti harder to find because they shrink and retract into the ground. Illegal activity at the Mexico – United States border is thought to impact the plant. Drug smuggling and illegal immigration activity damage the habitat in the area by increasing trampling, vehicle damage, and possibly incidence of fire. Trampling may also occur when well-meaning volunteers and researchers comb the area for specimens. The plant is probably a target for harvesting by cactus enthusiasts and dealers, but the populations in Arizona are relatively well-protected from this activity. Oil exploration and grazing affect the area. Invasive plant species, especially buffelgrass (Pennisetum ciliare), are becoming more abundant in this desert region and compete with native flora. Insects apparently damage the cacti, but to what extent is not known. This species is not particularly efficient in reproduction; each plant makes about 20 seeds per year and recruitment is slow.

Little is known about the life history of the cactus; research is still needed on its requirements for climate and substrate, its relationship with predators and pollinators, its abundance, population dynamics, and demographics.

== Taxonomy ==
The first description as Cochiseia robbinsorum by W. Hubert Earle was published in 1976. The specific epithet robbinsorum honors James A. Robbins and his sons Jimmi and John, who discovered the species. David Richard Hunt placed the species in the genus Escobaria in 1978. David Aquino & Daniel Sánchez moved the species to Pelecyphora based on phylogenetic studies in 2022. Further nomenclature synonyms are Coryphantha robbinsorum (W.H.Earle) A.D.Zimmerman (1978), Neobesseya robbinsorum (W.H.Earle) Doweld (2000) and Escobaria robbinsiorum (W.H.Earle) D.R.Hunt (1978).
