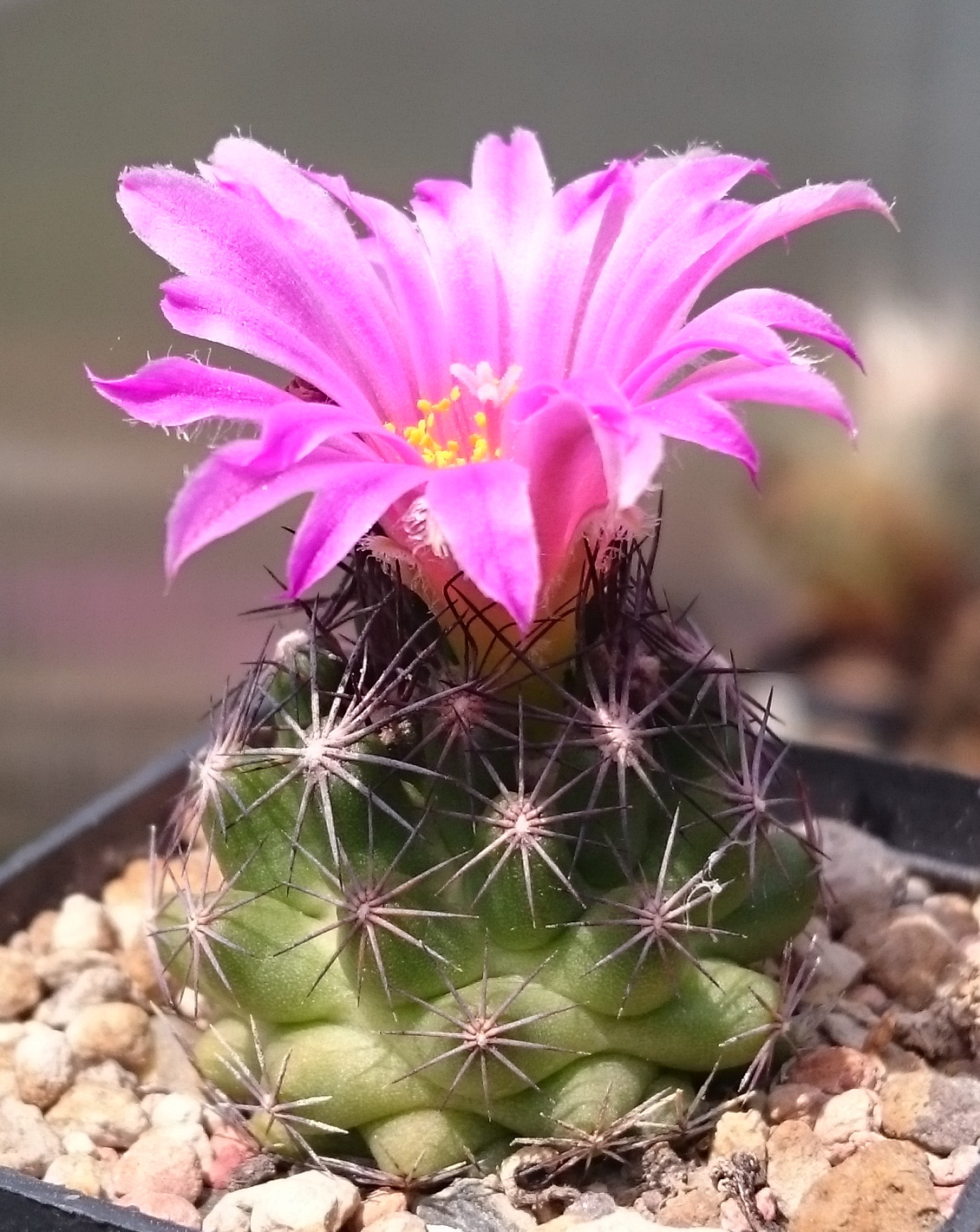

Scientific classification
- Kingdom: Plantae
- Clade: Tracheophytes
- Clade: Angiosperms
- Clade: Eudicots
- Order: Caryophyllales
- Family: Cactaceae
- Subfamily: Cactoideae
- Genus: Pelecyphora
- Species: P. hesteri

Binomial name
- Pelecyphora hesteri (Y.Wright) D.Aquino & Dan.Sánchez

Synonyms
- Coryphantha hesteri Y.Wright 1932; Escobaria hesteri (Y.Wright) Buxb. 1951

= Pelecyphora hesteri =

Species of cactus

Pelecyphora hesteri is a species of flowering plant in the family Cactaceae, native to Texas, United States and Mexico.

== Description ==
Pelecyphora hesteri grows with many shoots, is often richly branched and forms cushions. The egg-shaped to spherical shoots reach heights of 2.5 to 5 centimeters and diameters of 2.5 to 3.5 centimeters. Their wide and conspicuous warts are 7 to 12 millimeters long. The one to four white central spines are similar to the marginal spines and are up to 1.5 centimeters long. The twelve to 22 white marginal spines are 0.7 to 1.5 centimeters long.

The light pink to light purple flowers are 1.5 centimeters in diameter and up to 2.3 centimeters long. The green to yellowish, almost spherical fruits are 6 to 7 millimeters long. When ripe they become dry.

== Subspecies ==
There are two accepted subspecies:

Image	Scientific name	Distribution
	Pelecyphora hesteri subsp. grata (M.Kaplan, Kunte & Šnicer) D.Aquino & Dan.Sánchez	Mexico (Coahuila)
	Pelecyphora hesteri subsp. hesteri	Texas

== Distribution ==
Pelecyphora hesteri is distributed in Brewster County, Texas, in the United States and to NE. Mexico.

== Taxonomy ==
The first description as Coryphantha hesteri by Ysabel Wright was published in 1932. The specific epithet hesteri honors the American cactus lover John Pinckney Hester from Fredonia, one of the leading researchers of the Big Bend area. Franz Buxbaum placed the species in the genus Escobaria in 1951. Further nomenclature synonyms are Escobesseya hesteri (Y.Wright) Hester (1945, nom. inval. ICBN article 34.1), Mammillaria hesteri (Y.Wright) D.Weniger (1970, nom. inval. ICBN article 34.1) and Escobaria hesteri (Y.Wright) Buxb..
