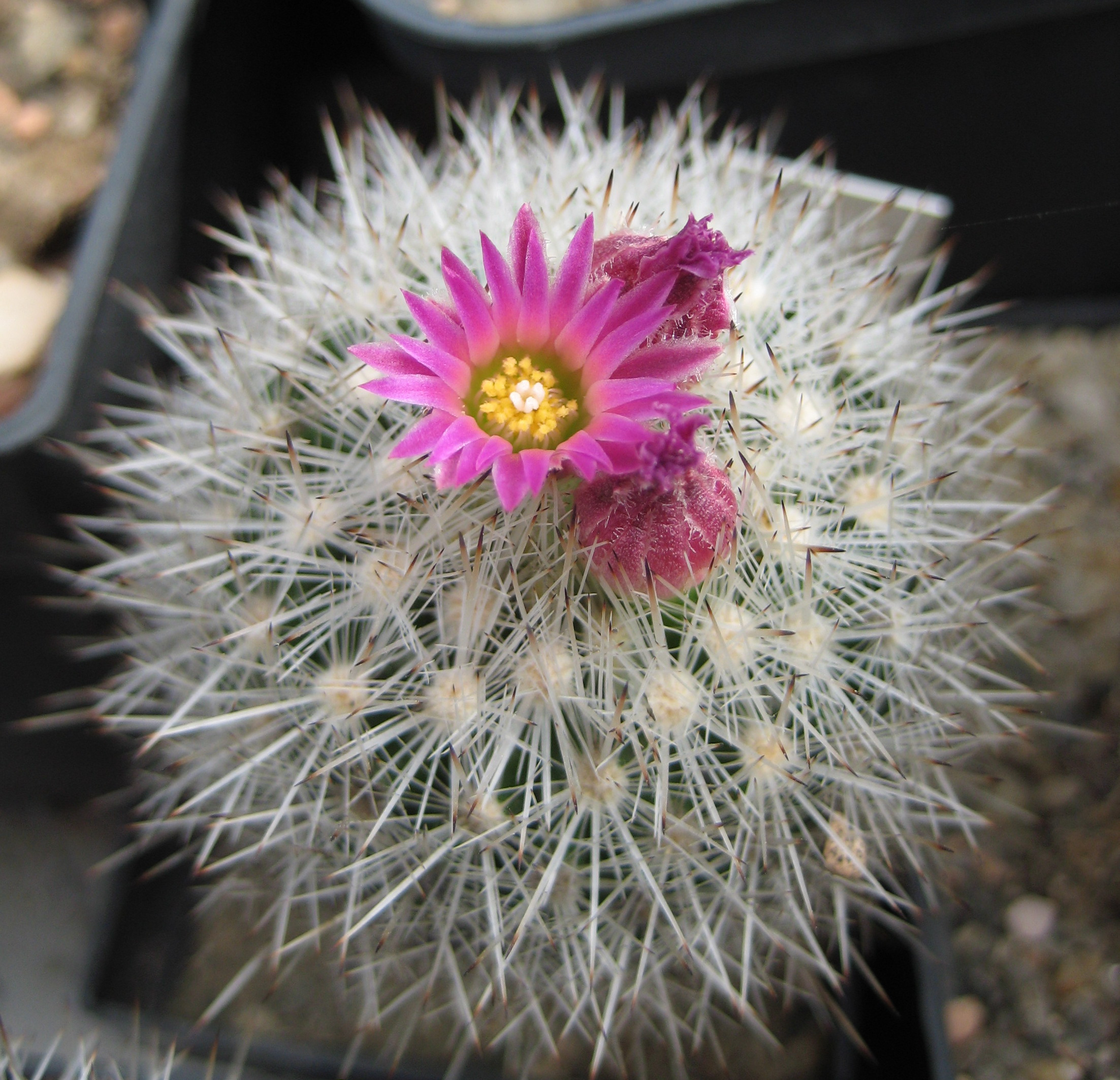

Scientific classification
- Kingdom: Plantae
- Clade: Tracheophytes
- Clade: Angiosperms
- Clade: Eudicots
- Order: Caryophyllales
- Family: Cactaceae
- Subfamily: Cactoideae
- Genus: Pelecyphora
- Species: P. laredoi

Binomial name
- Pelecyphora laredoi Glass & R.A.Foster) D.Aquino & Dan.Sánchez

= Pelecyphora laredoi =

Species of cactus

Pelecyphora laredoi is a species of flowering plant in the family Cactaceae, native to Mexico.

== Description ==
Pelecyphora laredoi grows with numerous shoots and often forms large, compact cushions. The spherical to slightly elongated shoots have a diameter of 4 to 4.5 centimeters. The ascending warts, furrowed to the base, are 10 to 12 millimeters long. The four to five spreading, ascending white central spines are strong and stiff. They are 1.1 to 1.4 centimeters long. The approximately 33 unequally long, radiating white marginal spines are stiff, straight to curved and 0.6 to 1.2 centimeters long.

The reddish lavender to magenta flowers open wide. They are 1.5 to 1.7 centimeters long and reach a diameter of 0.8 to 1 centimeter. The more or less pink-lavender to light green fruits are 1.2 to 1.4 centimeters long and occasionally covered with a few rudimentary scales.

== Distribution ==
Pelecyphora laredoi is widespread in the Mexican state of Coahuila.

== Taxonomy ==
The first description as Coryphantha laredoi by Charles Edward Glass and Robert Alan Foster was published in 1978. The specific epithet laredoi honors the Mexican gardener Mathias Laredo. Nigel Paul Taylor placed the species in the genus Escobaria a year later. David Aquino & Daniel Sánchez moved the species to Pelecyphora based on phylogenetic studies in 2022.
