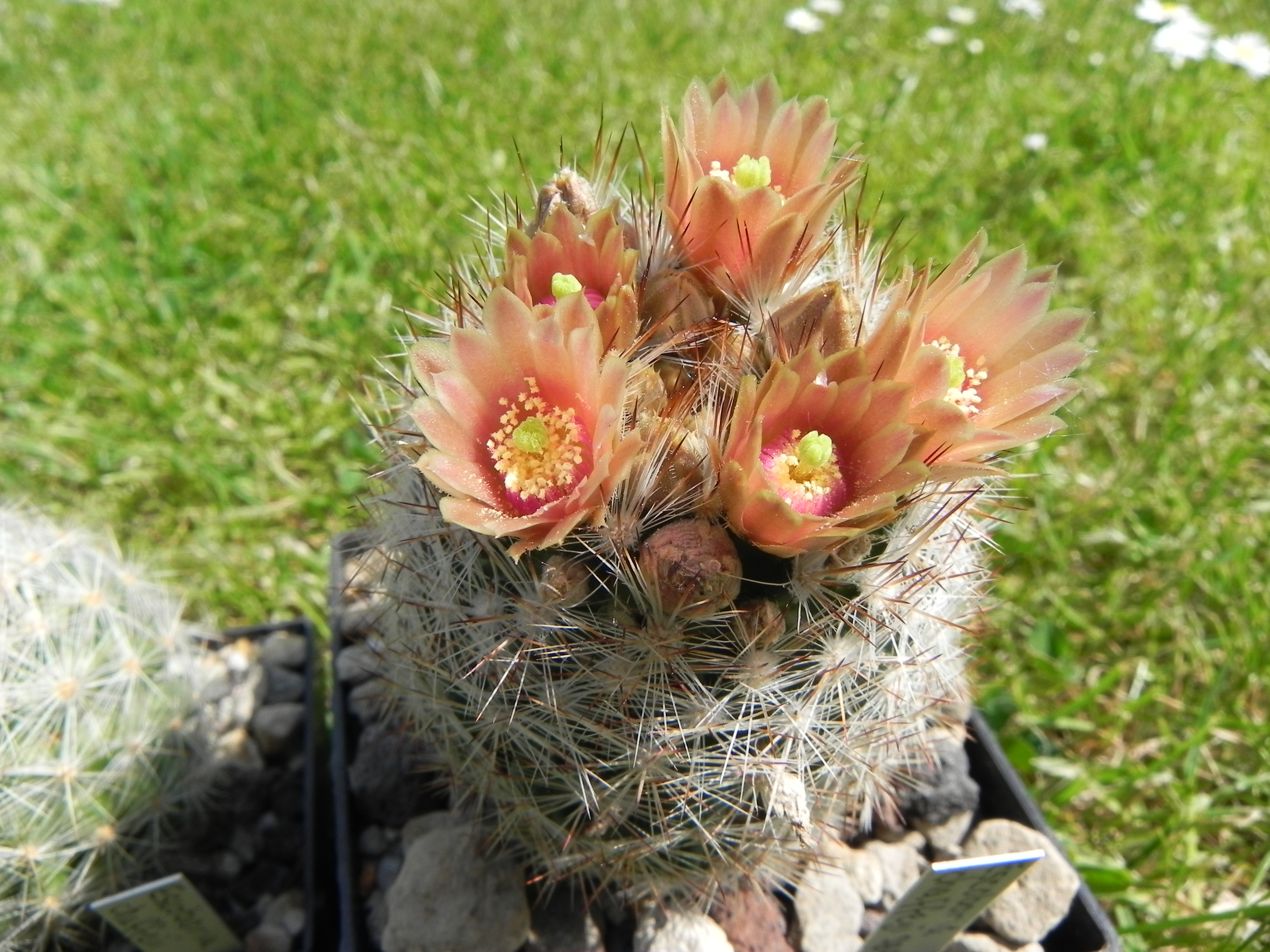

Conservation status
- Least Concern (IUCN 3.1)

Scientific classification
- Kingdom: Plantae
- Clade: Tracheophytes
- Clade: Angiosperms
- Clade: Eudicots
- Order: Caryophyllales
- Family: Cactaceae
- Subfamily: Cactoideae
- Genus: Pelecyphora
- Species: P. dasyacantha

Binomial name
- Pelecyphora dasyacantha (Engelm.) D.Aquino & Dan.Sánchez

Synonyms
- Cactus dasyacanthus (Engelm.) Kuntze 1891; Coryphantha dasyacantha (Engelm.) Orcutt 1922; Escobaria dasyacantha (Engelm.) Britton & Rose 1923; Escobesseya dasyacantha (Engelm.) Hester 1945; Mammillaria dasyacantha Engelm. 1856; Neobesseya dasyacantha (Engelm.) Lodé 2013

= Pelecyphora dasyacantha =

Species of cactus

Pelecyphora dasyacantha is a species of flowering plant in the family Cactaceae, native to the Mexico.

== Description ==
Pelecyphora dasyacantha grows singly and occasionally sprouts. The depressed spherical to short cylindrical shoots reach heights of up to 20 centimeters and diameters of 4 to 7 centimeters. The shoots are covered by the dense white thorns. Of the warts, which are up to 10 millimeters long, the older ones at the base of the shoots are often corked and thornless. The seven to 17 strong, white central spines are 2.5 centimeters long. The 25 to 50 or more marginal spines are strong, white and 0.6 to 2.5 centimeters long.

The flowers are more or less pink to brownish or occasionally greenish. They are up to 2 centimeters long and reach a diameter of 1.5 to 2 centimeters. The flowers rarely open completely due to the dense, stiff spines. The red, club-shaped fruits are up to 10 millimeters long.

=== Subspecies ===
There are two recognized subspecies:

Image	Scientific name	Distribution
	Pelecyphora dasyacantha subsp. chaffeyi (Britton & Rose) D.Aquino & Dan.Sánchez	Texas to NE. Mexico
	Pelecyphora dasyacantha subsp. dasyacantha	Texas to NE. Mexico (to Jalisco)

== Distribution ==
Pelecyphora dasyacantha is distributed in the United States in the states of New Mexico and Texas and the Mexican states of Chihuahua, Coahuila, Nuevo León and Zacatecas.

== Taxonomy ==
The first description as Mammillaria dasyacantha by George Engelmann was published in 1856. The specific epithet dasyacantha is derived from the Greek words dasys for 'dense', 'rough', 'shaggy' and akantha for 'thorn'. Nathaniel Lord Britton and Joseph Nelson Rose placed the species in the genus Escobaria in 1923. David Aquino & Daniel Sánchez moved the species to Pelecyphora based on phylogenetic studies in 2022. Other nomenclature synonyms are Cactus dasyacanthus (Engelm.) Kuntze (1891), Coryphantha dasyacantha (Engelm.) Orcutt (1922), Escobesseya dasyacantha (Engelm.) Hester (1945), Neobesseya dasyacantha (Engelm.) Lodé (2013) and Escobaria dasyacantha (Engelm.) Britton & Rose.
