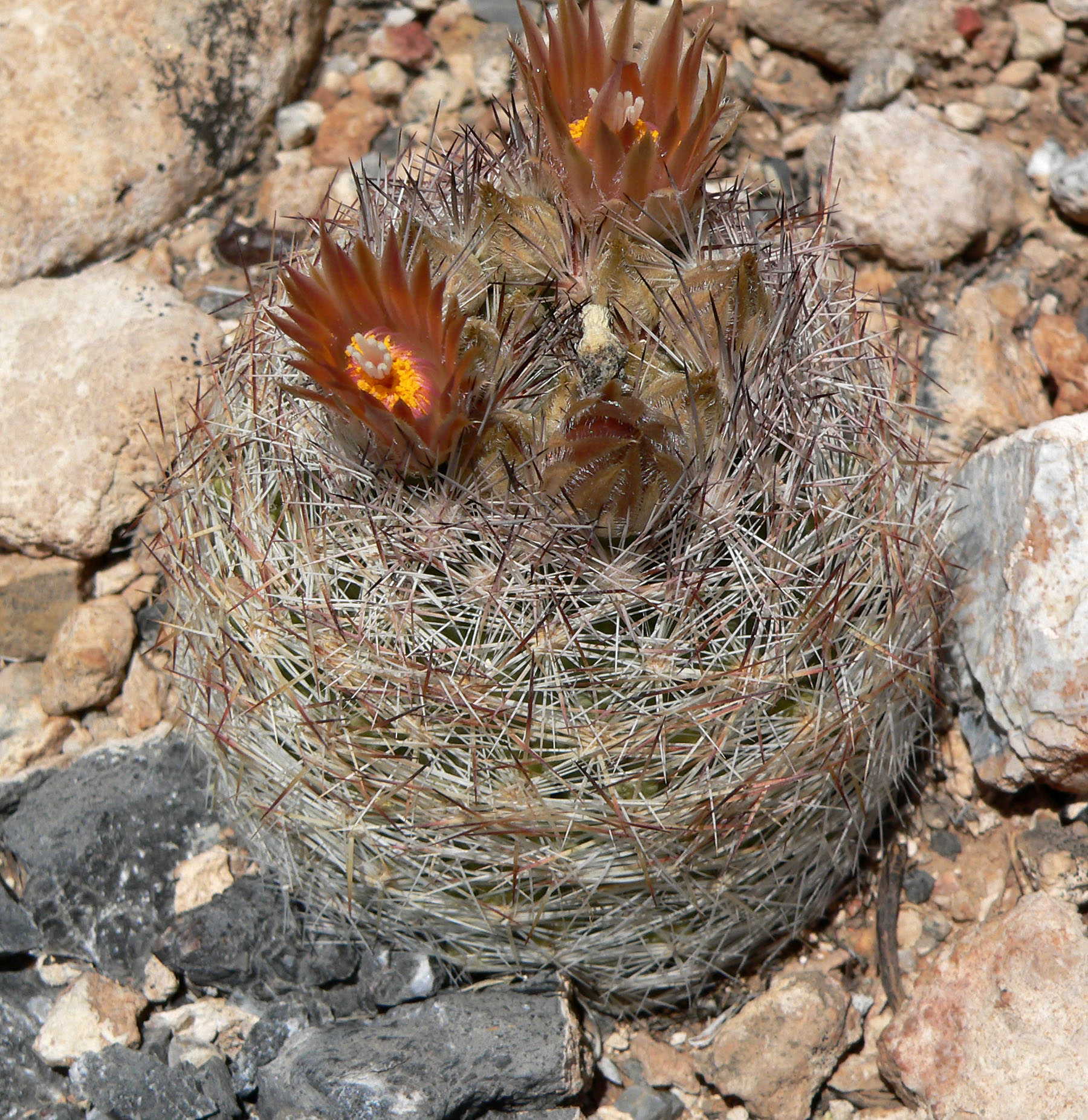

Scientific classification
- Kingdom: Plantae
- Clade: Embryophytes
- Clade: Tracheophytes
- Clade: Angiosperms
- Clade: Eudicots
- Order: Caryophyllales
- Family: Cactaceae
- Subfamily: Cactoideae
- Genus: Pelecyphora
- Species: P. chlorantha

Binomial name
- Pelecyphora chlorantha (Engelm.) Stock

Synonyms
- Cactus radiosus var. chloranthus (Engelm.) J.M.Coult. 1894; Coryphantha chlorantha (Engelm.) Britton & Rose 1923; Escobaria chlorantha (Engelm.) Buxb. 1951; Mammillaria chlorantha Engelm. 1878 publ. 1879; Mammillaria radiosa f. chlorantha (Engelm.) Schelle 1907; Mammillaria vivipara var. chlorantha (Engelm.) L.D.Benson 1950; Coryphantha deserti (Engelm.) Britton & Rose 1923; Coryphantha vivipara var. deserti (Engelm.) W.T. Marshall 1950; Escobaria deserti (Engelm.) Buxb. 1951; Escobaria vivipara var. deserti (Engelm.) D.R. Hunt 1978; Mammillaria deserti Engelm. 1880

= Pelecyphora chlorantha =

Species of cactus

Pelecyphora chlorantha is a species of Pelecyphora found in the United States.

== Description ==
Pelecyphora chlorantha usually grows solitary or in small groups with a diameter of 7–9 cm (2.8–3.5 in). The cylindrical shoots reach heights of up to 7–15 cm (2.8–5.9 in). The plants have 12–33 radial spines per areoles. The four to eleven central spines have a white to dark red or black tip and are 12 to 20 millimeters long. The flowers are yellow green to dull brown and reach a diameter of around 2-3 centimeters and up to 3 cm long, blooming from April to may. The ellipsoid fruits are green and 2.5 cm long with brown seeds. Chromosome count is 2n=22.

== Distribution ==
Plants are found growing in limestone ridges and Pinyon–juniper woodland in northwest Arizona, in San Bernardino County California, Nevada, and southwestern Utah at elevations between 1,000 and 2,400 meters (3,300 and 7,900 ft). The plant is found growing along with Yucca brevifolia.

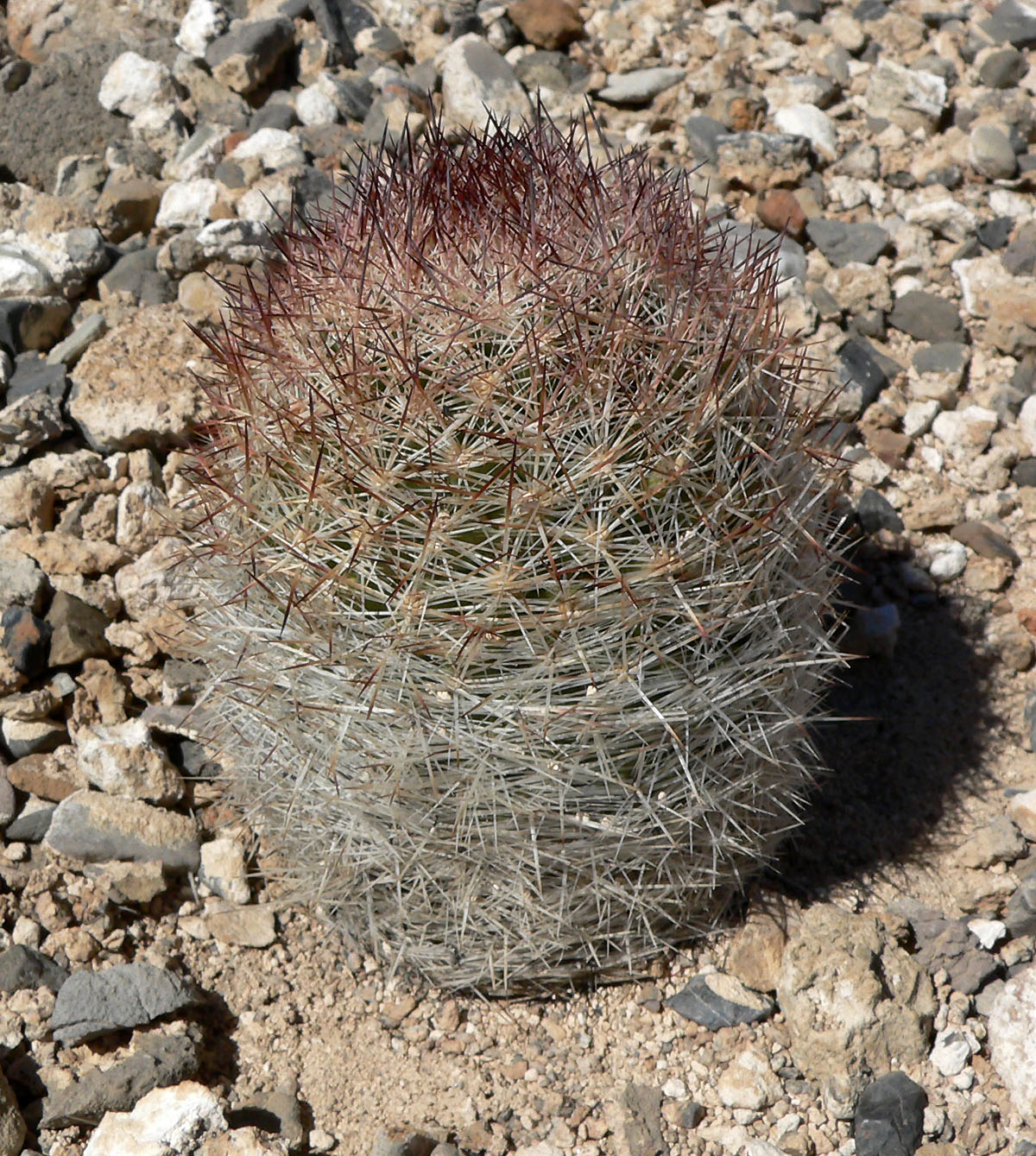
Plant growing in Kyle Canyon, Spring Mountains, west of Las Vegas, Nevada

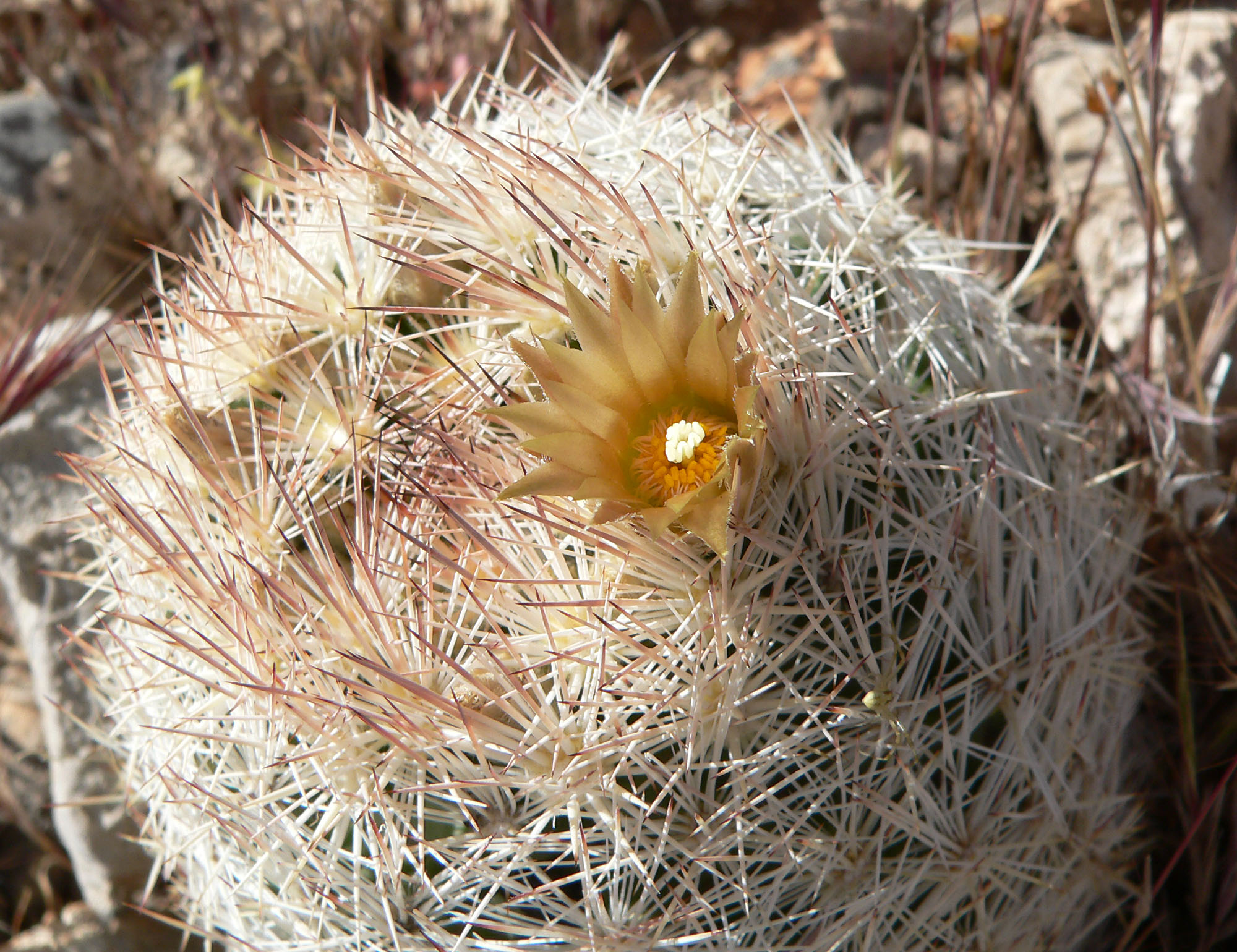
Pelecyphora chlorantha in Red Rock Canyon near Las Vegas, Nevada

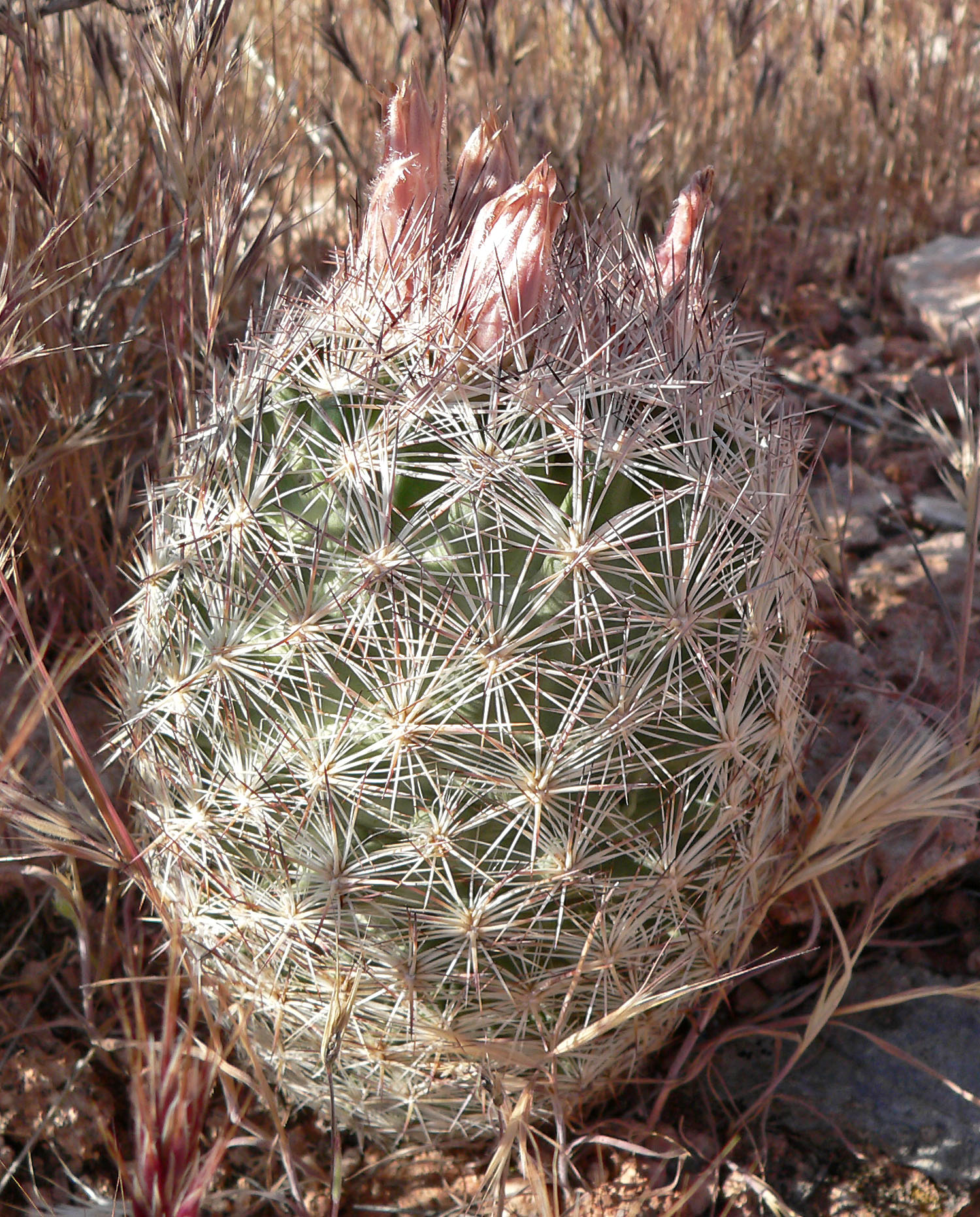
Plant in bud in Calico Basin west of Las Vegas, Nevada

== Taxonomy ==
This plant was originally described as Mammillaria chlorantha by Engelmann in 1878. The plant was moved to Pelecyphora based on DNA sequence and morphological data in 2022.
