= Pelecyphora zilziana =

Scientific classification
- Kingdom: Plantae
- Clade: Tracheophytes
- Clade: Angiosperms
- Clade: Eudicots
- Order: Caryophyllales
- Family: Cactaceae
- Subfamily: Cactoideae
- Genus: Pelecyphora
- Species: P. zilziana

Binomial name
- Pelecyphora zilziana (Boed.) D.Aquino & Dan.Sánchez

Synonyms
- Coryphantha zilziana Boed. 1930; Escobaria zilziana (Boed.) Backeb. 1961; Neobesseya zilziana (Boed.) Boed. 1933; Escobaria zilziana subsp. fricii Halda & Sladk. 2000

Species of cactus

Pelecyphora zilziana is a species of flowering plant in the family Cactaceae, native to Mexico.

== Description ==
Pelecyphora zilziana usually grows solitary, but sometimes sprouts from the base. The cylindrical shoots reach heights of 6 to 10 centimeters and a diameter of 3 centimeters. Their warts are up to 10 millimeters long. Central spines are usually not present. Occasionally one or more are present that resemble marginal spines. The 16 to 22 straight marginal thorns lie on the surface of the shoot. They are up to 1.5 centimeters long.

The light yellow, olive green or whitish flowers have pink central stripes. They are 3 centimeters long and reach a diameter of 2.5 centimeters. The red, club-shaped fruits are 2 centimeters long.

== Distribution ==
Pelecyphora zilziana is widespread in the Mexican state of Coahuila.

== Taxonomy ==
The first description as Coryphantha zilziana by Friedrich Bödeker was published in 1930. The specific epithet zilziana honors the Austrian doctor and cactus collector Juljan Zilz. Curt Backeberg placed the species in the genus Escobaria in 1961. David Aquino & Daniel Sánchez moved the species to Pelecyphora based on phylogenetic studies in 2022. Further nomenclature synonym are Neobesseya zilziana (Boed.) Boed. (1933), Neobesseya zilziana (Boed.) Boed. ex Backeb. & F. M. Knuth (1936) and Escobaria zilziana (Boed.) Backeb. (1961).
