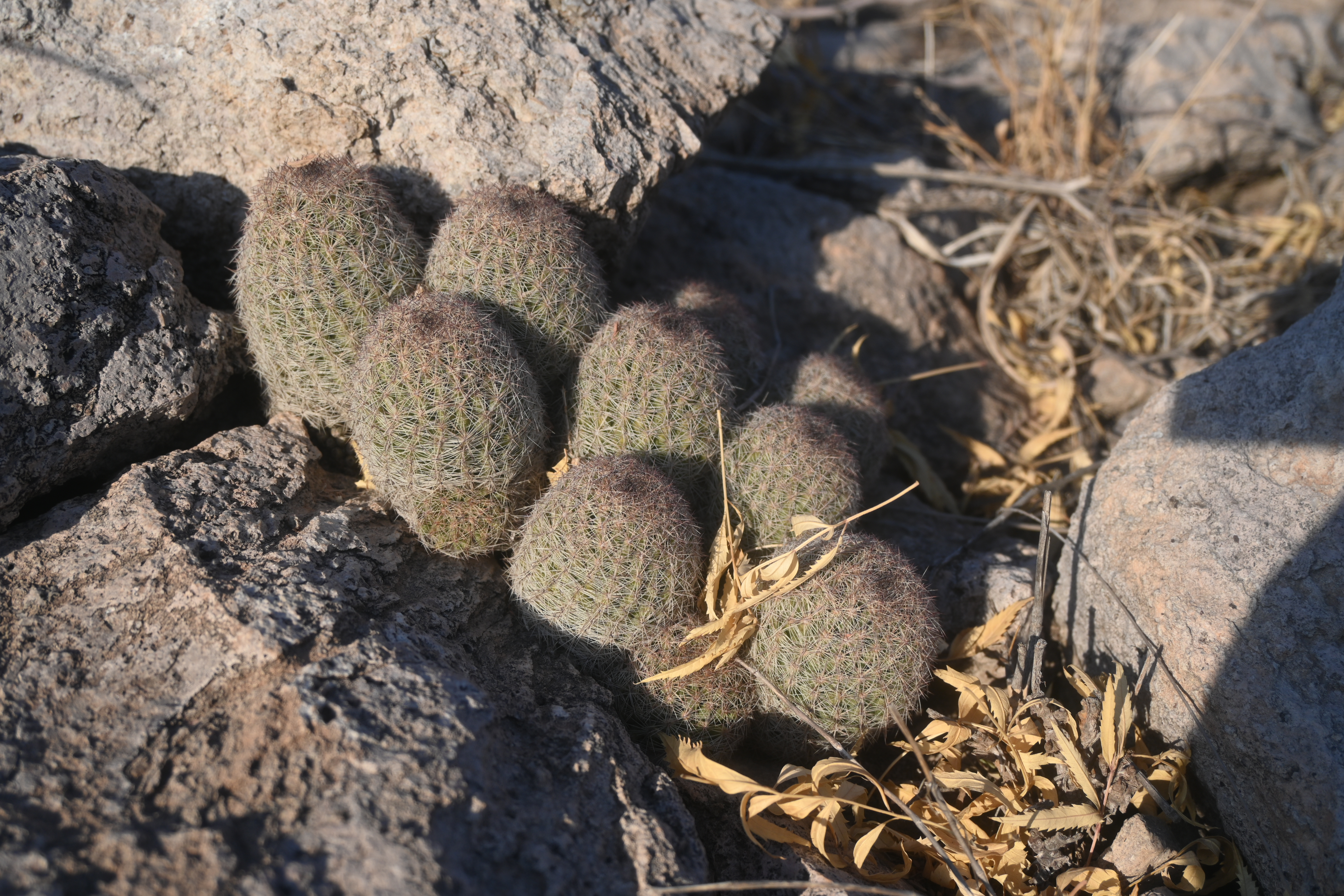
- In situ specimen of P. chihuahuensis.

Conservation status
- Least Concern (IUCN 3.1)

Scientific classification
- Kingdom: Plantae
- Clade: Embryophytes
- Clade: Tracheophytes
- Clade: Spermatophytes
- Clade: Angiosperms
- Clade: Eudicots
- Order: Caryophyllales
- Family: Cactaceae
- Subfamily: Cactoideae
- Genus: Pelecyphora
- Species: P. chihuahuensis

Binomial name
- Pelecyphora chihuahuensis (Britton & Rose) D.Aquino & Dan.Sánchez

Synonyms
- Coryphantha chihuahuensis (Britton & Rose) A.Berger 1929; Escobaria chihuahuensis Britton & Rose 1923; Escocoryphantha chihuahuensis (Britton & Rose) Doweld 1999

= Pelecyphora chihuahuensis =

Species of cactus

Pelecyphora chihuahuensis is a species of flowering plant in the family Cactaceae, native to Mexico.

== Description ==
Pelecyphora chihuahuensis usually grows singly, but sometimes with several shoots and has tuberous roots. The cylindrical to spherical shoots reach heights of up to 20 centimeters with diameters of 6 to 7 centimeters. The short warts are furrowed on their upper side. The five to ten central spines have a darker tip and are 1.5 to 10 millimeters long and around 20 to 32 white radial spines that are 4 to 8 millimeters long.

The flowers are light pink to slightly purple. They are 1.5 to 2 centimeters long and reach a diameter of up to 2 centimeters. The green or reddish elongated fruits are up to 10 millimeters long and have a diameter of 7 millimeters.

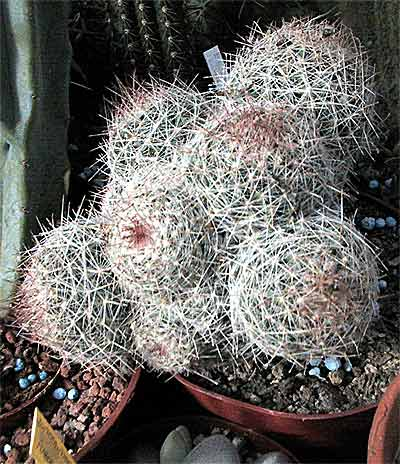
Plant

=== Subspecies ===
There are two recognized subspecies.

Image	Name	Distribution
	Pelecyphora chihuahuensis subsp. chihuahuensis	NE. Mexico
	Pelecyphora chihuahuensis subsp. henricksonii (Glass & R.A.Foster) D.Aquino & Dan.Sánchez	Mexico (Chihuahua)

== Distribution ==
Pelecyphora chihuahuensis is found in the Mexican states of Chihuahua and Durango.

== Taxonomy ==
The first description by Nathaniel Lord Britton and Joseph Nelson Rose was published in 1923. The specific epithet chihuahuensis refers to the occurrence of the species in the Mexican state of Chihuahua. Nomenclature synonyms are Coryphantha chihuahuensis (Britton & Rose) A.Berger (1929) and Escocoryphantha chihuahuensis (Britton & Rose) Doweld (1999).
