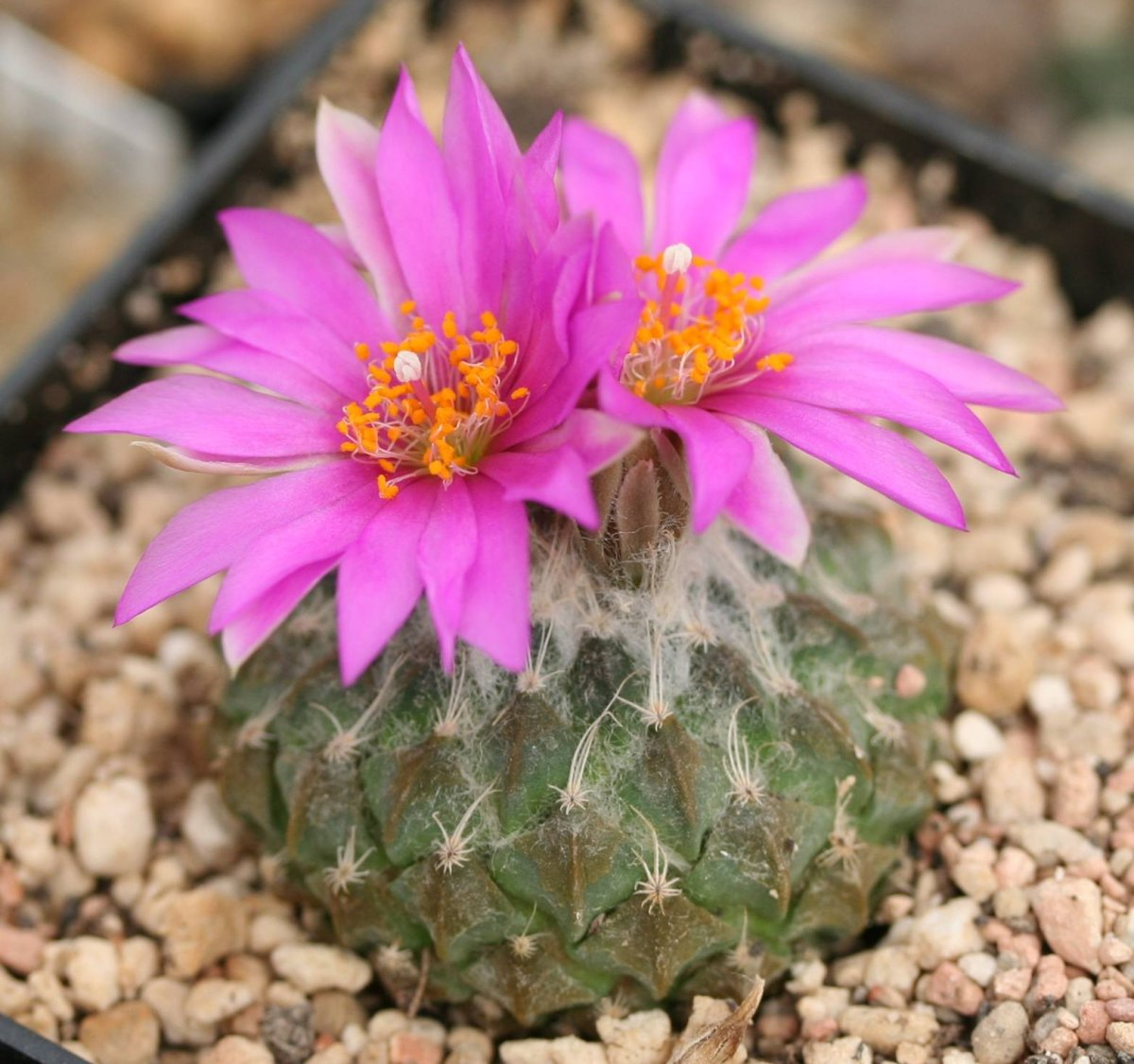

Conservation status
- Least Concern (IUCN 3.1)
- CITES Appendix I (CITES)

Scientific classification
- Kingdom: Plantae
- Clade: Tracheophytes
- Clade: Angiosperms
- Clade: Eudicots
- Order: Caryophyllales
- Family: Cactaceae
- Subfamily: Cactoideae
- Genus: Pelecyphora
- Species: P. strobiliformis

Binomial name
- Pelecyphora strobiliformis (Werderm.) Frič & Schelle ex Kreutz.

Synonyms
- Ariocarpus strobiliformis Werderm. 1927; Encephalocarpus strobiliformis (Werderm.) A.Berger 1929

= Pelecyphora strobiliformis =

Species of cactus

Pelecyphora strobiliformis is a species of cactus from Mexico. Its numbers in the wild have been reduced by collecting; it is listed in Appendix I of CITES (meaning that international trade is severely controlled) but only as of "Least Concern" by the IUCN.

== Description ==
Pelecyphora strobiliformis grows with spherical or depressed spherical bodies that are 4 to 6 centimeters in diameter. The warts that lie on the surface overlap each other. They are slightly keeled and the outline is triangular. The warts are 8 to 12 millimeters long and 7 to 12 millimeters wide at their base. The 7 to 12 flexible, whitish, non-persistent spines are arranged somewhat comb-shaped at the tip of the wart and are 5 millimeters long.

The magenta-colored flowers reach a diameter of 1.5 to 3 centimeters. The small fruits are hidden in the hair on the crown. When ripe, they dry out and eventually break down over time.

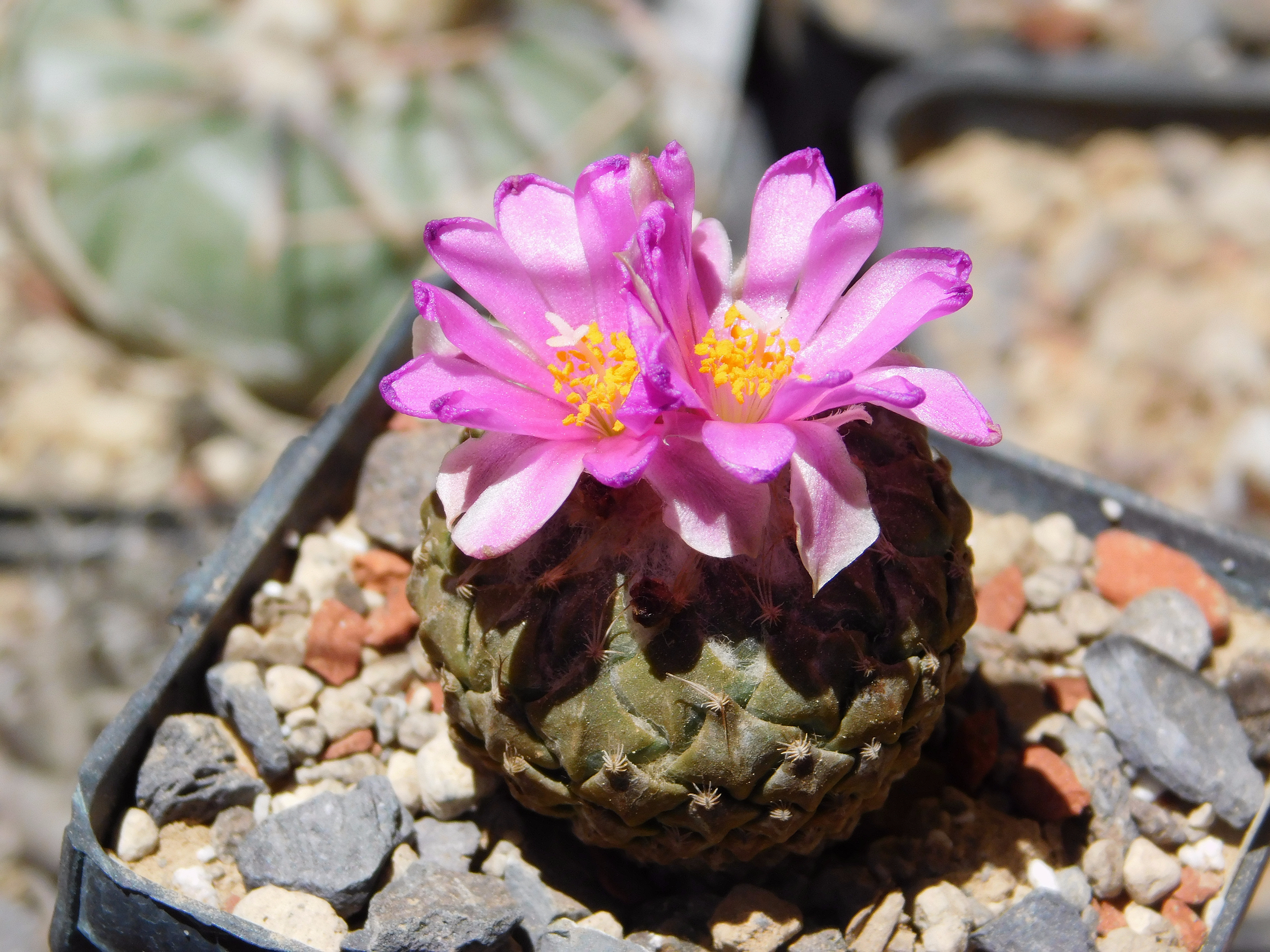

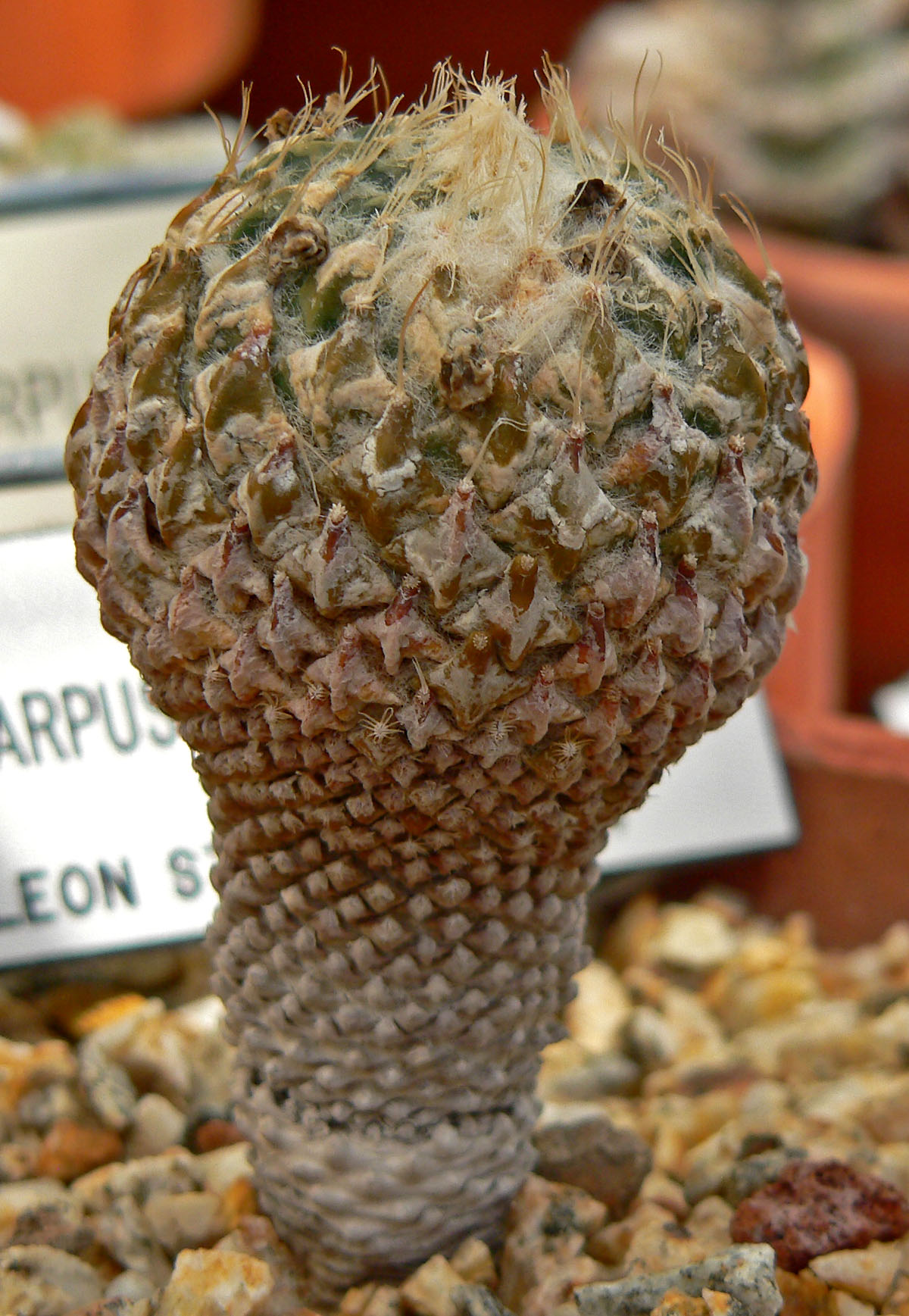

== Distribution ==
Pelecyphora strobiliformis is widespread in the Mexican states of Nuevo León, Tamaulipas and San Luis Potosí in the Chihuahuan Desert at altitudes below 1600 meters.

== Taxonomy ==
The first description as Ariocarpus strobiliformis was made in 1927 by Erich Werdermann. Alwin Berger described the monotypic genus Encephalocarpus for this species in 1929. Alberto Vojtěch Frič and Ernst Schelle placed them in the genus Pelecyphora in 1935.
