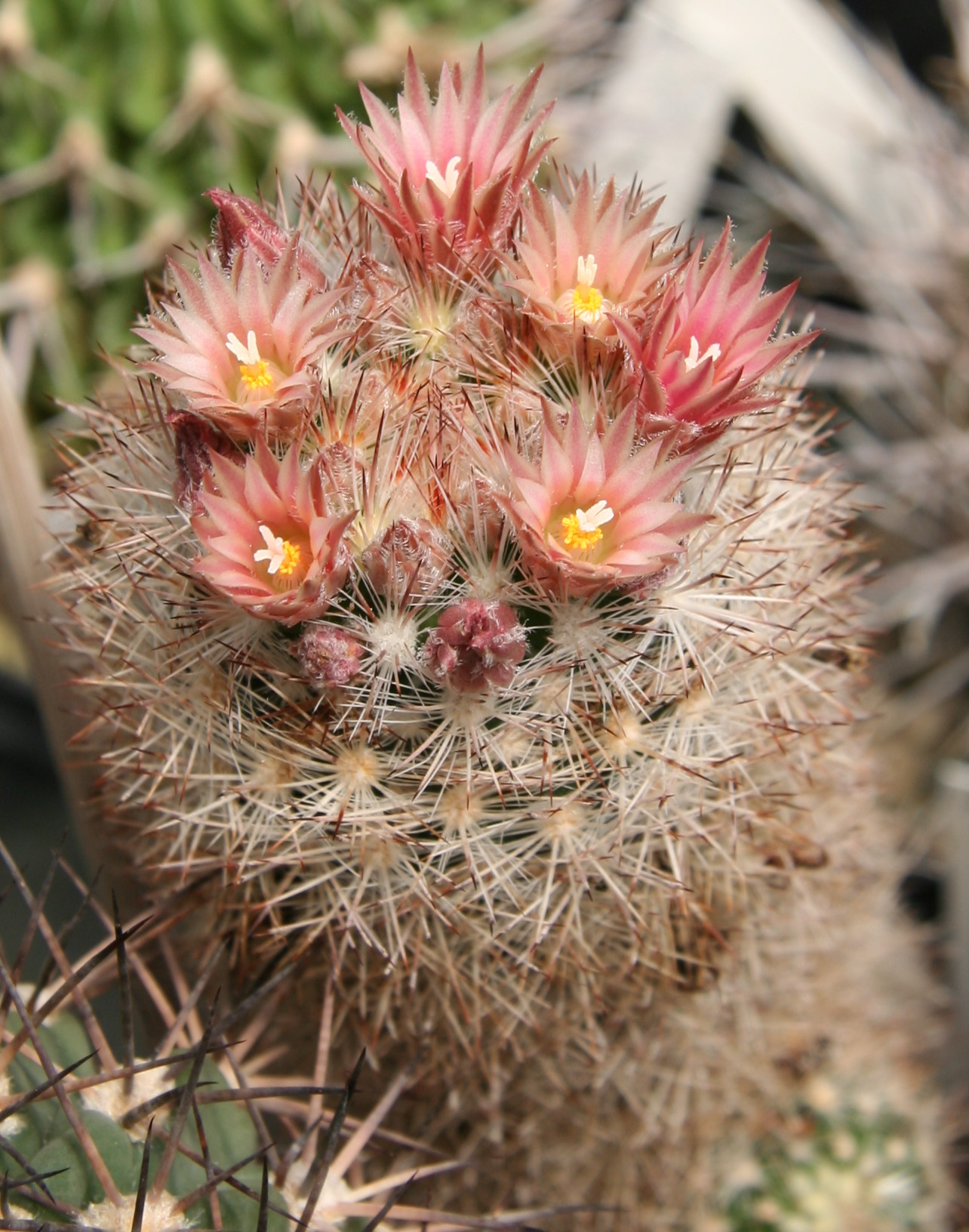
- In bloom
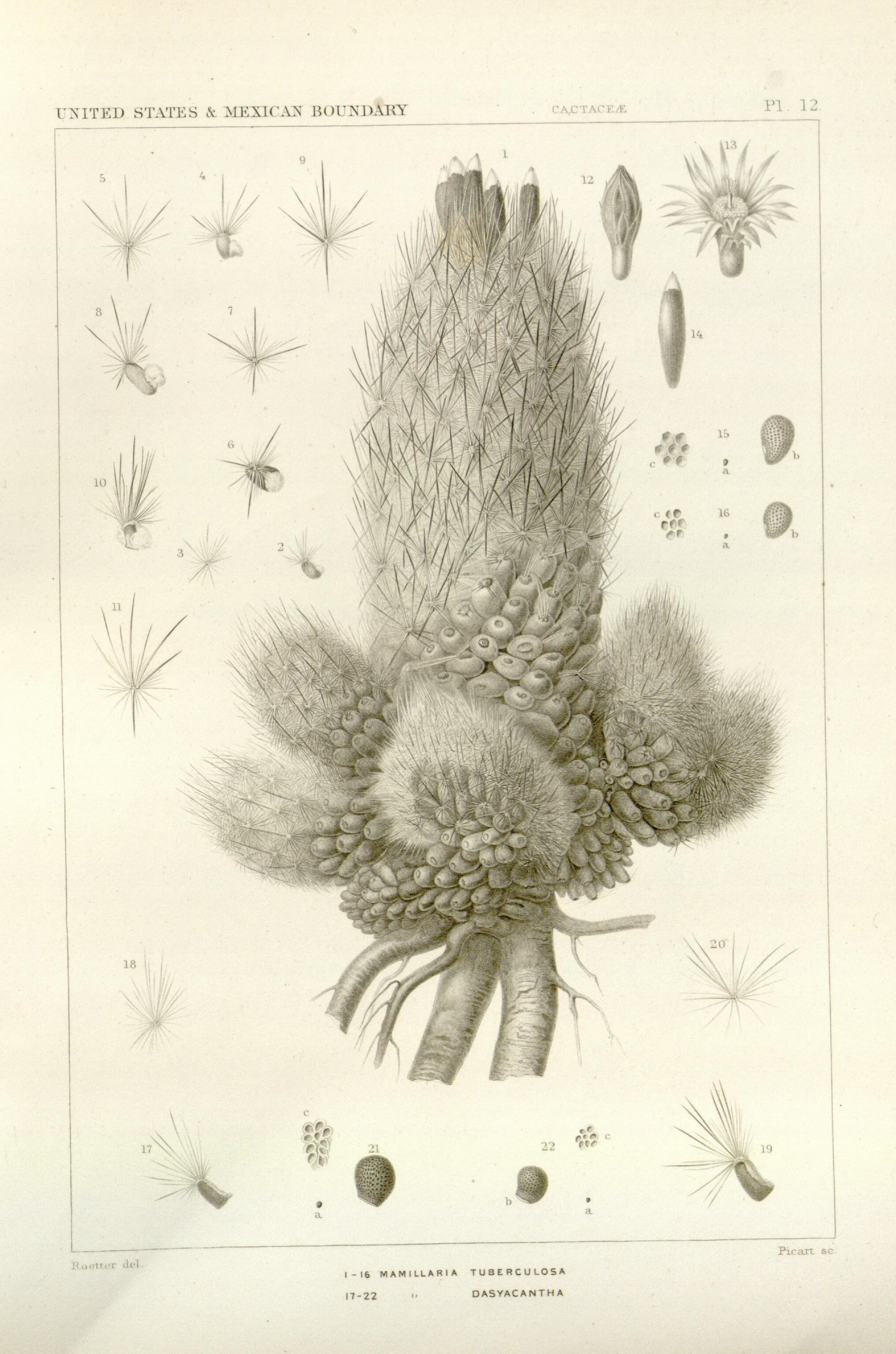
- Botanical illustration

Conservation status
- Least Concern (IUCN 3.1)

Scientific classification
- Kingdom: Plantae
- Clade: Tracheophytes
- Clade: Angiosperms
- Clade: Eudicots
- Order: Caryophyllales
- Family: Cactaceae
- Subfamily: Cactoideae
- Genus: Pelecyphora
- Species: P. tuberculosa

Binomial name
- Pelecyphora tuberculosa (Engelm.) D.Aquino & Dan.Sánchez
- Range

Synonyms
- List: Cactus tuberculosus (Engelm.) Kuntze; Coryphantha dasyacantha var. varicolor (Tiegel) L.D.Benson; Coryphantha strobiliformis var. durispina (Quehl) L.D.Benson; Coryphantha tuberculosa (Engelm.) Orcutt; Coryphantha tuberculosa var. varicolor (Tiegel) A.D.Zimmerman; Coryphantha varicolor Tiegel; Escobaria dasyacantha var. varicolor (Tiegel) D.R.Hunt; Escobaria strobiliformis var. durispina (Quehl) Bravo; Escobaria strobiliformis subsp. sisperai Halda & Sladk.; Escobaria tuberculosa (Engelm.) Britton & Rose; Escobaria tuberculosa var. durispina (Quehl) Børgesen; Escobaria tuberculosa var. pubescens (Quehl) Y.Itô; Escobaria tuberculosa subsp. varicolor (Tiegel) Lüthy; Escobaria tuberculosa var. varicolor (Tiegel) S.Brack & K.D.Heil; Mammillaria strobiliformis f. durispina (Quehl) Schelle; Mammillaria strobiliformis var. durispina Quehl; Mammillaria strobiliformis var. pubescens Quehl; Mammillaria strobiliformis f. pubescens (Quehl) Schelle; Mammillaria strobiliformis var. rufispina Quehl; Mammillaria strobiliformis f. rufispina (Quehl) Schelle; Mammillaria tuberculosa Engelm.

= Pelecyphora tuberculosa =

Species of plant

Pelecyphora tuberculosa (syn. Escobaria tuberculosa), the corncob cactus, is a species of flowering plant in the family Cactaceae, native to the south-central United States, and northern Mexico.

== Description ==
Escobaria tuberculosa grows singly or in groups and is very variable. The cylindrical to egg-shaped shoots reach heights of 5 to 12 centimeters with diameters of 2.5 to 7 centimeters. The warts, up to 10 millimeters long, become hard and persistent. The four to eight yellow, straight central spines have a pink or red tip and are 1 to 2 centimeters long. In the middle one of them is stronger. The approximately 20 to 30 yellow, white or gray marginal spines are straight and spread out. They are up to 1.2 centimeters long.

The fragrant flowers are pink and open wide. They are 2 to 3 centimeters long and reach the same diameter. The elongated fruits are usually red and 1.2 to 2 centimeters long.

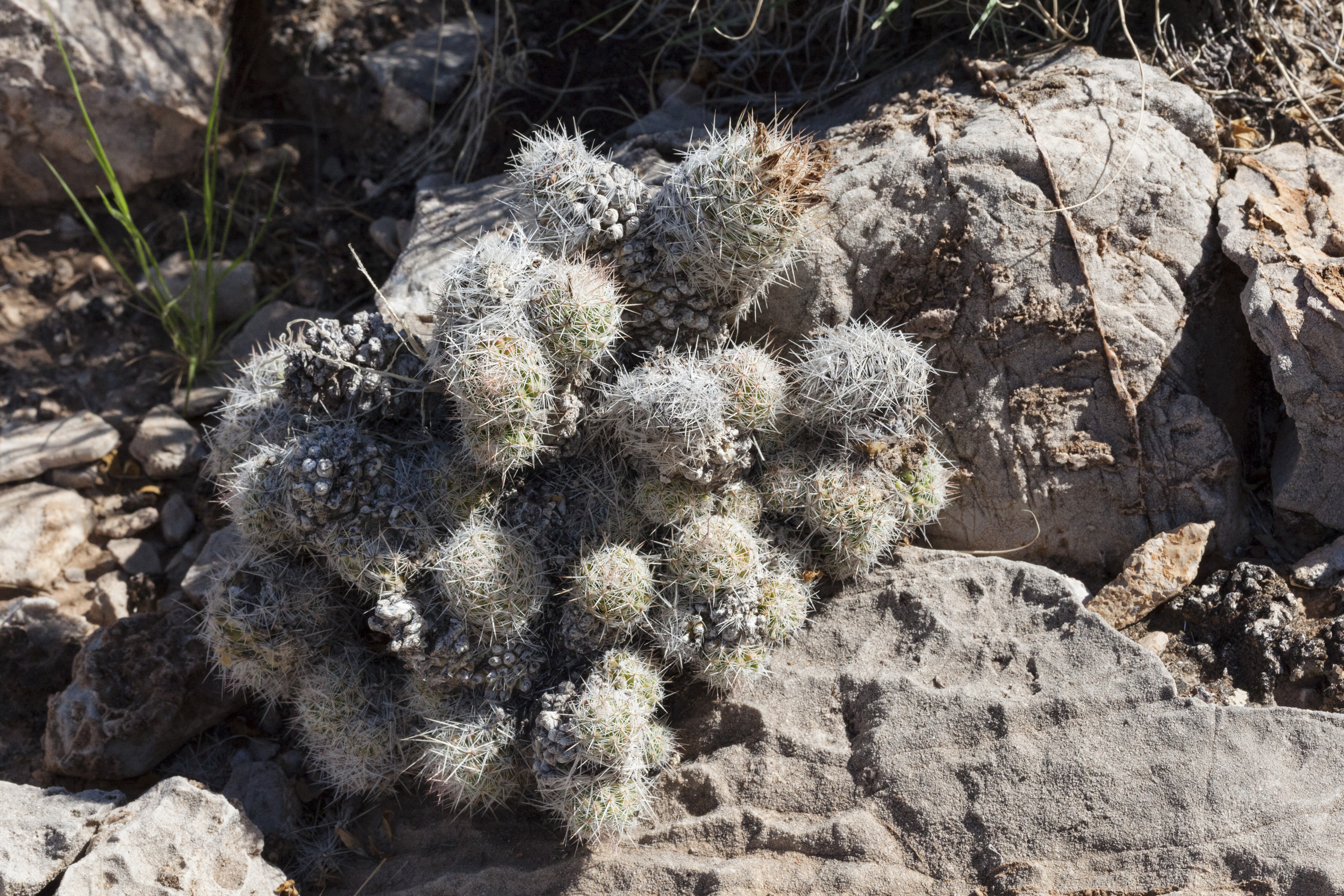
In eastern Bishops Cap Hills, Doña Ana County, New Mexico

== Distribution ==
Escobaria tuberculosa is fairly widespread in the United States in the states of New Mexico and Texas, as well as in the Mexican states of Chihuahua, Durango, Coahuila and Nuevo León. It is only found growing on igneous rocks.

== Taxonomy ==
The first description as Mammillaria tuberculosa by George Engelmann was published in 1856. The specific epithet tuberculosa comes from Latin, means 'humpy', and refers to the bumpy shoots of the species. Nathaniel Lord Britton and Joseph Nelson Rose placed the species in the genus Escobaria in 1923. Nomenclatural synonyms include Coryphantha tuberculosa (Engelm.) Orcutt (1922) and Coryphantha tuberculosa (Engelm.) A.Berger (1929).
