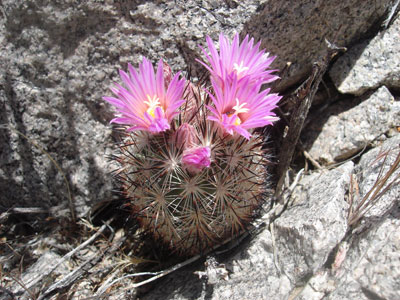

Conservation status
- Least Concern (IUCN 3.1)

Scientific classification
- Kingdom: Plantae
- Clade: Tracheophytes
- Clade: Angiosperms
- Clade: Eudicots
- Order: Caryophyllales
- Family: Cactaceae
- Subfamily: Cactoideae
- Genus: Pelecyphora
- Species: P. alversonii

Binomial name
- Pelecyphora alversonii (J.M.Coult.) D.Aquino & Dan.Sánchez

Synonyms
- Cactus radiosus var. alversonii J.M.Coult. 1894; Coryphantha alversonii (J.M.Coult.) Orcutt 1926; Coryphantha vivipara var. alversonii (J.M.Coult.) L.D.Benson 1969; Escobaria alversonii (J.M.Coult.) N.P.Taylor 1997; Escobaria vivipara var. alversonii (J.M.Coult.) D.R.Hunt 1978; Mammillaria alversonii (J.M.Coult.) Zeiss. 1895; Mammillaria radiosa var. alversonii (J.M.Coult.) K.Schum. 1898; Mammillaria vivipara var. alversonii (J.M.Coult.) L.D.Benson 1950

= Pelecyphora alversonii =

Species of cactus

Pelecyphora alversonii commonly known as cushion foxtail cactus or cushion fox-tail cactus, is a species of flowering plant in the family Cactaceae, native to the southwestern United States.

== Description ==
Pelecyphora alversonii usually grows sprouting and forms underground, cylindrical offshoots with a diameter of 6–9 cm. The more or less spherical shoots reach heights of up to 7-25 centimeters. The plants have 18-33 radial spines per areoles. The eight to ten central spines have a white to dark red or black tip and are 1.2 to 1.6 centimeters long. The twelve to 18 white marginal spines are 1.2 to 2 centimeters long.

The flowers are magenta to pink and reach a diameter of around 3.2 centimeters. The ellipsoid fruits are green. Chromosome count is 2n = 22.

== Distribution ==
Pelecyphora alversonii is widespread in the United States in southeastern California in the Mojave Desert and neighboring Arizona at elevations around 75–600 meters.

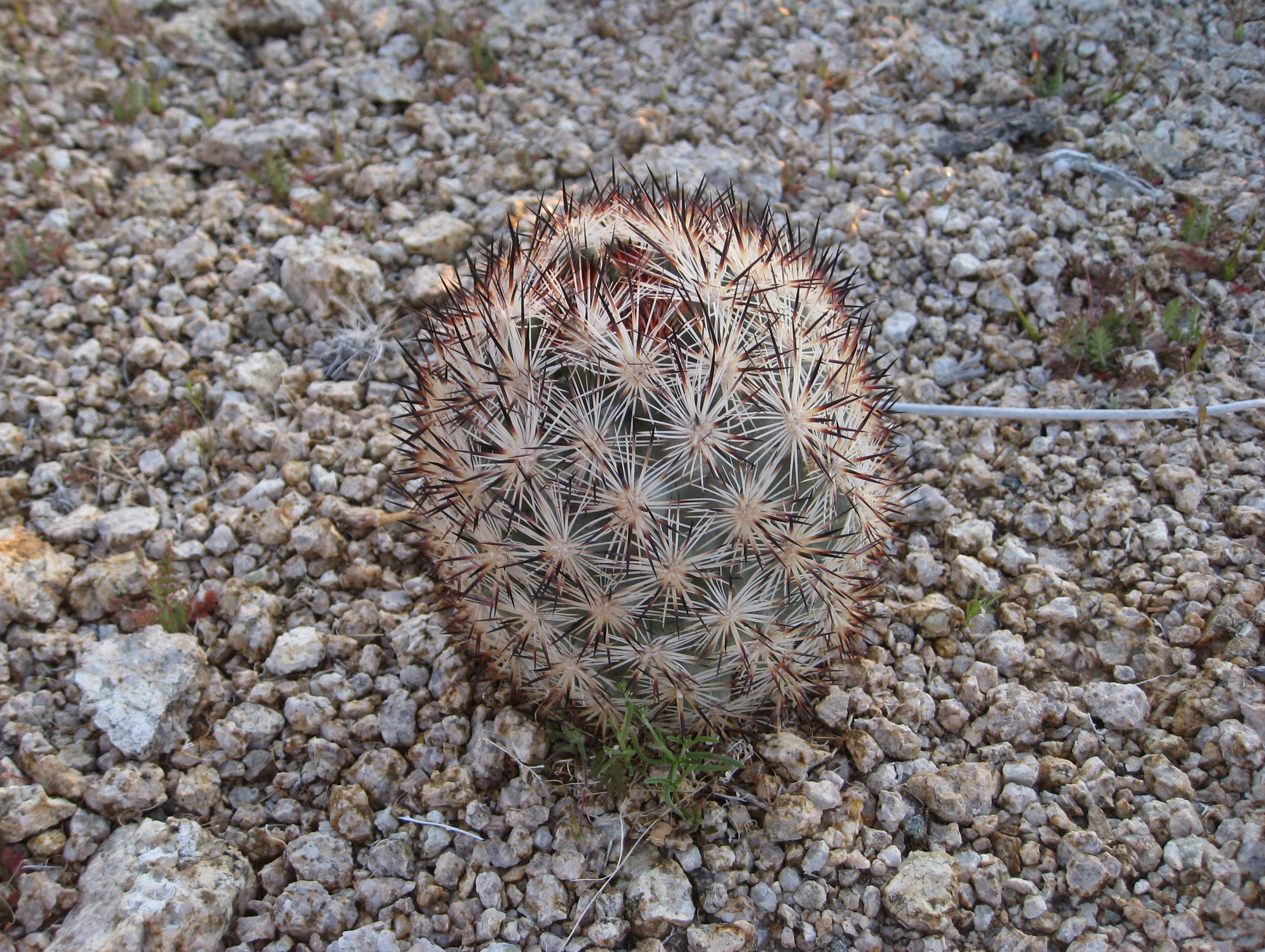
P. alversonii in Joshua Tree National Park, California

== Taxonomy ==
The first description as Cactus radiosus var. alversonii by John Merle Coulter was published in 1894. The specific epithet alversonii honors the mineral explorer Andrew H. Alverson (1845–1916). Nigel Paul Taylor placed the variety as a species in the genus Escobaria in 1997. David Aquino & Daniel Sánchez moved the species to Pelecyphora based on phylogenetic studies in 2022. Further nomenclature synonyms are Mammillaria alversonii (J.M.Coult.) Zeiss. (1895), Mammillaria radiosa var. alversonii (J.M.Coult.) K.Schum. (1898), Mammillaria arizonica var. alversonii (J.M.Coult.) Davidson & Moxley (1923), Coryphantha alversonii (J.M.Coult.) Orcutt (1926), Mammillaria vivipara var vivipara var. alversonii (J.M.Coult.) L.D.Benson (1969), Escobaria vivipara var. alversonii (J.M.Coult.) D.R.Hunt (1978) and Escobaria alversonii (J.M.Coult.) N.P.Taylor (1997).

== Conservation status ==
It is vulnerable species on the California Native Plant Society Inventory of Rare and Endangered Plants.
