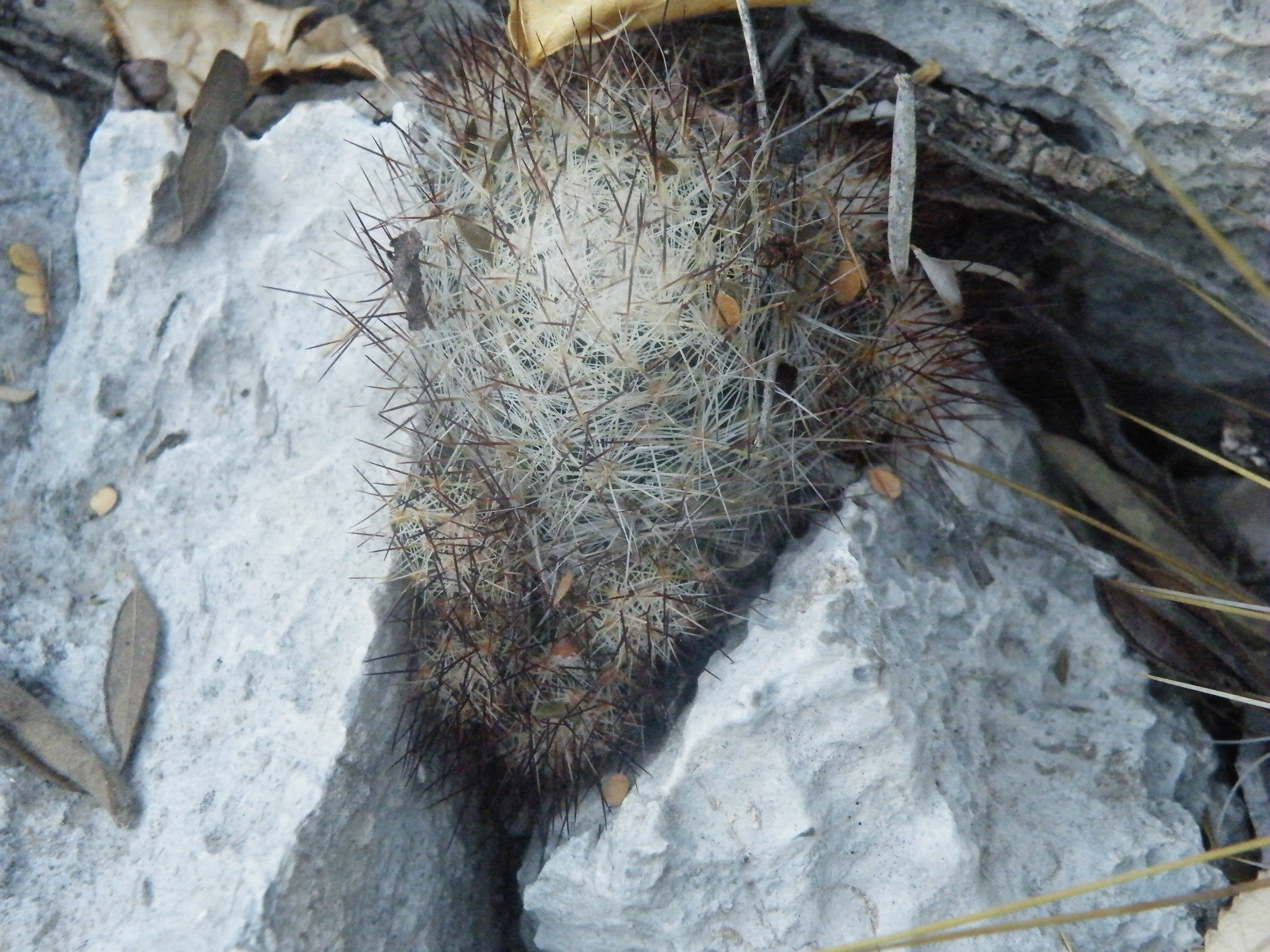

Conservation status
- Least Concern (IUCN 3.1)

Scientific classification
- Kingdom: Plantae
- Clade: Tracheophytes
- Clade: Angiosperms
- Clade: Eudicots
- Order: Caryophyllales
- Family: Cactaceae
- Subfamily: Cactoideae
- Genus: Pelecyphora
- Species: P. emskoetteriana

Binomial name
- Pelecyphora emskoetteriana (Quehl) D.Aquino & Dan.Sánchez

Synonyms
- Coryphantha emskoetteriana (Quehl) A.Berger 1929; Escobaria emskoetteriana (Quehl) Borg 1937; Mammillaria emskoetteriana Quehl 1910; Neobesseya emskoetteriana (Quehl) Lodé 2013; Coryphantha bella (Britton & Rose) Fosberg 1931; Coryphantha muehlbaueriana Boed. 1929; Coryphantha piercei Fosberg 1931; Coryphantha roberti A.Berger 1929; Escobaria bella Britton & Rose 1923; Escobaria muehlbaueriana (Boed.) F.M.Knuth 1936; Escobaria runyonii Britton & Rose 1923; Mammillaria escobaria Cory 1936; Neobesseya muehlbaueriana (Boed.) Boed. 1933

= Pelecyphora emskoetteriana =

Species of cactus

Pelecyphora emskoetteriana is a species of flowering plant in the family Cactaceae, native to the Mexico and southern United States.

== Description ==
Pelecyphora emskoetteriana usually grows sprouting and forms groups up to 10 centimeters high. The spherical to short cylindrical shoots reach heights of 5 to 12 centimeters and diameters of 2 to 2.5 centimeters. Their 6 to 10 millimeter long warts at the base of the shoots are often not persistent. The five to eight straight, yellow central spines have a darker tip and often resemble the marginal spines. They are up to 1.2 centimeters long. The 20 to 30 white, straight and irregularly spread marginal spines are up to 1 centimeter long.

The flowers are dirty white to lavender to light purple. They are 2 to 2.5 centimeters long and reach the same diameter. The red, spherical to ellipsoidal fruits have a diameter of 6 to 9 millimeters.

== Distribution ==
Pelecyphora emskoetteriana is distributed in the western United States in the state of Texas in the plains of the Rio Grande and the Mexican states of Coahuila, Nuevo León and Tamaulipas.

== Taxonomy ==
The first description as Mammillaria emskoetteriana by Leopold Quehl was published in 1910. The specific epithet emskoetteriana honors the German gardener Robert Emskotter in Magdeburg. John Borg placed the species in the genus Escobaria in 1937. David Aquino & Daniel Sánchez moved the species to Pelecyphora based on phylogenetic studies in 2022. Further nomenclature synonyms are Turbinicarpus pseudomacrochele (Backeb.) Buxb. & Backeb., Coryphantha emskoetteriana (Quehl) A.Berger (1929), Escobaria emskoetteriana (Quehl) Borg (1937) and Neobesseya emskoetteriana (Quehl) Lodé (2013)
