= Pelecyphora duncanii =

Conservation status
- Least Concern (IUCN 3.1)

Scientific classification
- Kingdom: Plantae
- Clade: Tracheophytes
- Clade: Angiosperms
- Clade: Eudicots
- Order: Caryophyllales
- Family: Cactaceae
- Subfamily: Cactoideae
- Genus: Pelecyphora
- Species: P. duncanii

Binomial name
- Pelecyphora duncanii (Hester) D.Aquino & Dan.Sánchez

Species of cactus

Pelecyphora duncanii is a species of flowering plant in the family Cactaceae, native to the southern United States.

== Description ==
Pelecyphora duncanii grows solitary or forms groups. The circular, almost spherical to inverted conical green shoots reach heights of 2.5 to 6 centimeters and the same diameter. The shoots are covered by the dense thorns. Their non-solid, cylindrical warts are up to 6 millimeters long. The 30 to 75 white thorns have a darker tip and cannot be divided into central and peripheral thorns. They are slender, fragile, needle-like, straight to curved or twisted, and up to 2 centimeters long.

The pink flowers are up to 3 centimeters long. The red, club-shaped fruits are up to 10 millimeters long.

== Distribution ==
Pelecyphora duncanii is widespread in the United States in southern New Mexico and western Texas.

== Taxonomy ==
The first description as Escobesseya duncanii by J. Pinckney Hester was published in 1945. The specific epithet duncanii honors the American Frank Duncan, who owned the mining field where the species was discovered. Franz Buxbaum placed the species in the genus Escobaria in 1960. David Aquino & Daniel Sánchez moved the species to Pelecyphora based on phylogenetic studies in 2022. Further nomenclature synonyms are Escobaria duncanii (Hester) Backeb. (1961), Coryphantha duncanii (Hester) L.D.Benson (1969), Mammillaria duncanii (Hester) D.Weniger (1970), Escobaria dasyacantha var. duncanii (Hester) N.P.Taylor (1983) and Neobesseya duncanii (Hester) Lodé (2013).
