= Woody Minnich =

American cactus expert (born 1947)

Wendell S. Minnich, better known as "Woody" Minnich (born 1947), is an American field explorer, photographer, grower, and lecturer primarily known for his extensive field documentation of cacti and succulents.

== Early life ==
Born in Ohio in 1947, Minnich was raised in the Mojave Desert by his father, an outdoorsman and a rocket scientist involved in the development of the Sidewinder missile, and his mother, a painter. He developed an interest in desert flora and fauna during the 1950s when his father would bring him along to the desert areas surrounding the Naval Air Weapons Station at China Lake. During college he would commute home through the Simi Valley, driving by a house with a cactus garden. Bill and Ellen Lowe, the owners of the house, gifted him his first plants and introduced him to the cactus scene in Baja California.

Later on he was noticed by Werner Rauh, then Director of Heidelberg's botanical gardens, who introduced him to field research and invited him on his expeditions.

== Contributions ==
=== Cactus Data Plants ===
Since 1975, Minnich has operated the nursery Cactus Data Plants. Started as a way to sell extra stock from his collection, Cactus Data Plants has become known for catering to hardcore cactus growers, collectors, and botanical gardens in search of show specimens and rare cacti. Its main focus has been on Ariocarpus, Astrophytum, Mammillaria, Gymnocalycium, Turbinicarpus, Melocactus, Copiapoa, Fouquieria, Pachypodium, Euphorbia, Cyphostemma, Adenium, and Adenia.

In 1986, CITES and ESA protected species Aztekium ritteri and Ariocarpus agavoides were found on the premises of Cactus Data Plants. Minnich was indicted on federal charges of unlawful importation, fined $2,500, put on supervised probation for five years, and had his car confiscated.

The nursery moved in 2017 when Minnich relocated from California to New Mexico. Now located in Edgewood, it downsized to 1,200 square feet, and only sells via wholesale and at selected shows and clubs.

=== Field documentation ===
Minnich is primarily known for documenting cacti and succulents in their habitats on more than 128 major trips around the world. While the majority have been in Mexico, he has also explored Argentina, Australia, Bolivia, Brazil, Chile, Madagascar, Namibia, New Zealand, Peru, South Africa, the United States, and Yemen. During his trips he claims to have discovered three major species of Mammillaria, including Mammillaria minnichii, found in Oaxaca, Mexico and named after him. However, Mammillaria minnichii is a nomen nudum.

==== Lecturing ====
Minnich has lectured extensively at conventions, events, and organizations around the world. His lectures focus on his field documentation and the importance of conservation efforts, as well as the threats posed by habitat destruction, climate change, and over-collection.

==== Selected photographic bibliography ====
His field photographs have been published in many books and journals, including:

- Cactus and Succulent Journal (various issues)
- Mammillaria: the cactus file handbook (Pilbeam, 1999)
- Echeveria Cultivars (Schulz and Kappitany, 2005)
- The New Cactus Lexicon (Graham and Hunt, 2006)
- Copiapa (Schulz, 2016)
- Xerophile: Cactus Photographs from Expeditions of the Obsessed (Cactus Store, 2021)

=== Awards and leadership ===
Minnich is an honorary life member of 9 clubs and a life member of the CSSA (Cactus & Succulent Society of America). Over the course of his career, he has covered many leadership roles at various organizations, including being President of the Los Angeles Cactus and Succulent Society and co-creator and current president of the Santa Fe Cactus and Succulent Club.

== Personal life ==
Minnich lives with his wife in Cedar Grove, New Mexico. Together, they have 3 children: Leah, Denver, and Sarah Minnich.

He is of German and 1/64 Sac and Fox heritage. In the 60s he played guitar in The Humane Society (band). For over 32 years he worked as a secondary school teacher of Graphics, Art, and Architecture, until he retired in 2003.
