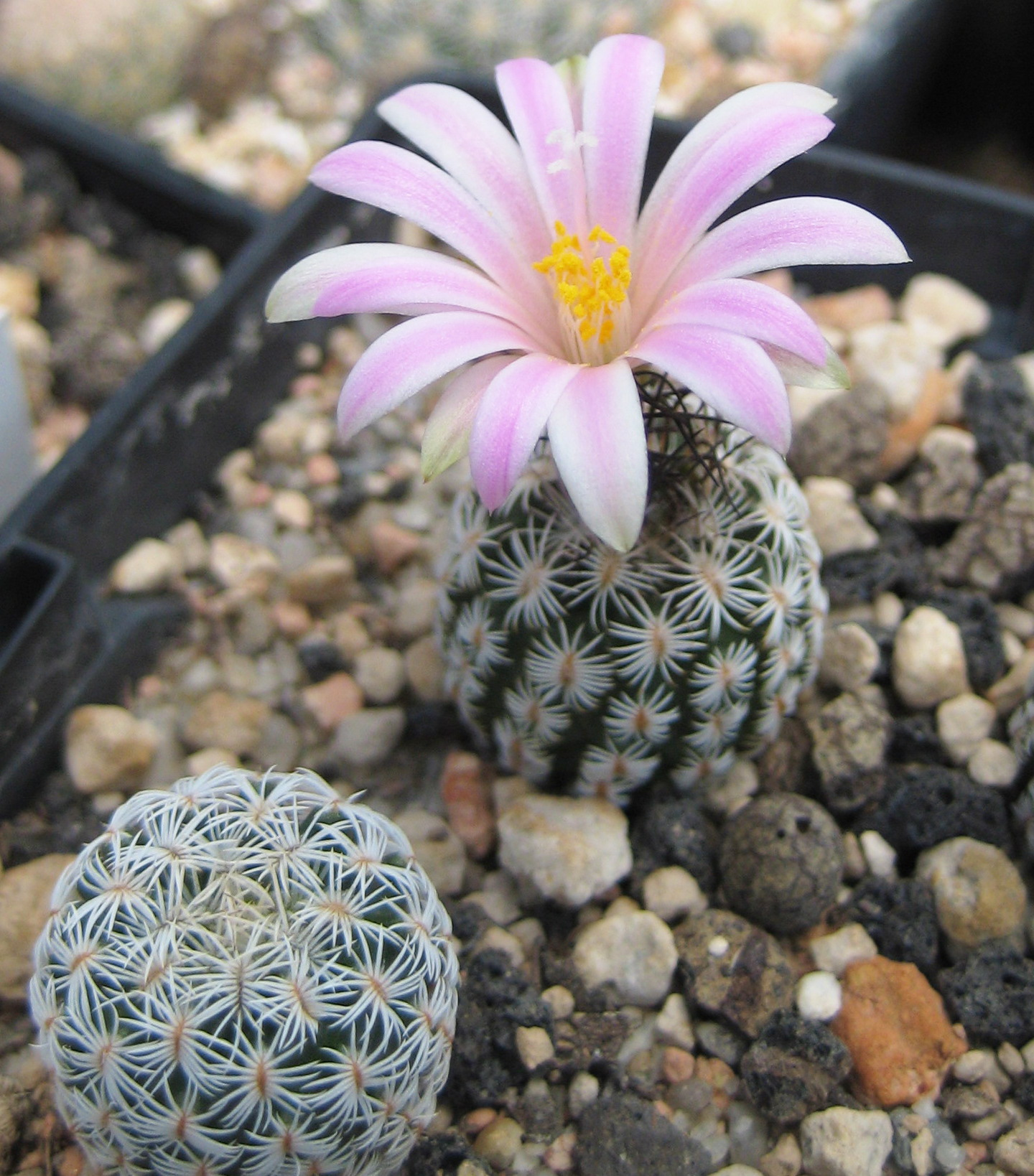
- Kadenicarpus pseudomacrochele

Scientific classification
- Kingdom: Plantae
- Clade: Tracheophytes
- Clade: Angiosperms
- Clade: Eudicots
- Order: Caryophyllales
- Family: Cactaceae
- Subfamily: Cactoideae
- Tribe: Cacteae
- Genus: Kadenicarpus; Doweld

Synonyms
- Bravocactus Doweld

= Kadenicarpus =

Genus of cacti

Kadenicarpus is a genus of flowering plants belonging to the family Cactaceae. It is native to eastern Mexico. It has been synonymized with Turbinicarpus but molecular phylogenetic studies have supported its monophyly and separation from that genus.

== Taxonomy ==
The genus Kadenicarpus was first proposed by Alexander Doweld in 1998. The name is in honour of Nikolai Nikolayevich Kaden (1914–1976), a Russian botanist. Most subsequent treatments rejected Kadenicarpus, sinking it into a broadly circumscribed genus Turbinicarpus. The circumscription of Turbinicarpus has been described as "remarkably unstable", with species regularly transferred to other genera. The broad circumscription of Turbinicarpus was recognized as polyphyletic by Hunt in 2016. A phylogenetic study published in 2019 showed that a monophyletic Kadenicarpus was sister to a clade of Ariocarpus and a more narrowly circumscribed and so monophyletic Turbinicarpus:

- - Kadenicarpus
  - - Ariocarpus
    - Turbinicarpus s.s.

=== Species ===
As of October 2025, Plants of the World Online accepted two species:

Image	Name	Distribution
	Kadenicarpus heliae (García-Mor., Díaz-Salím & Gonz.-Bot.) D.Aquino	Mexico (Hidalgo)
	Kadenicarpus horripilus (Lem.) Vázquez-Sánchez	Hidalgo state of Mexico.
	Kadenicarpus pseudomacrochele (Backeb.) Doweld	Hidalgo and Querétaro states of Mexico
