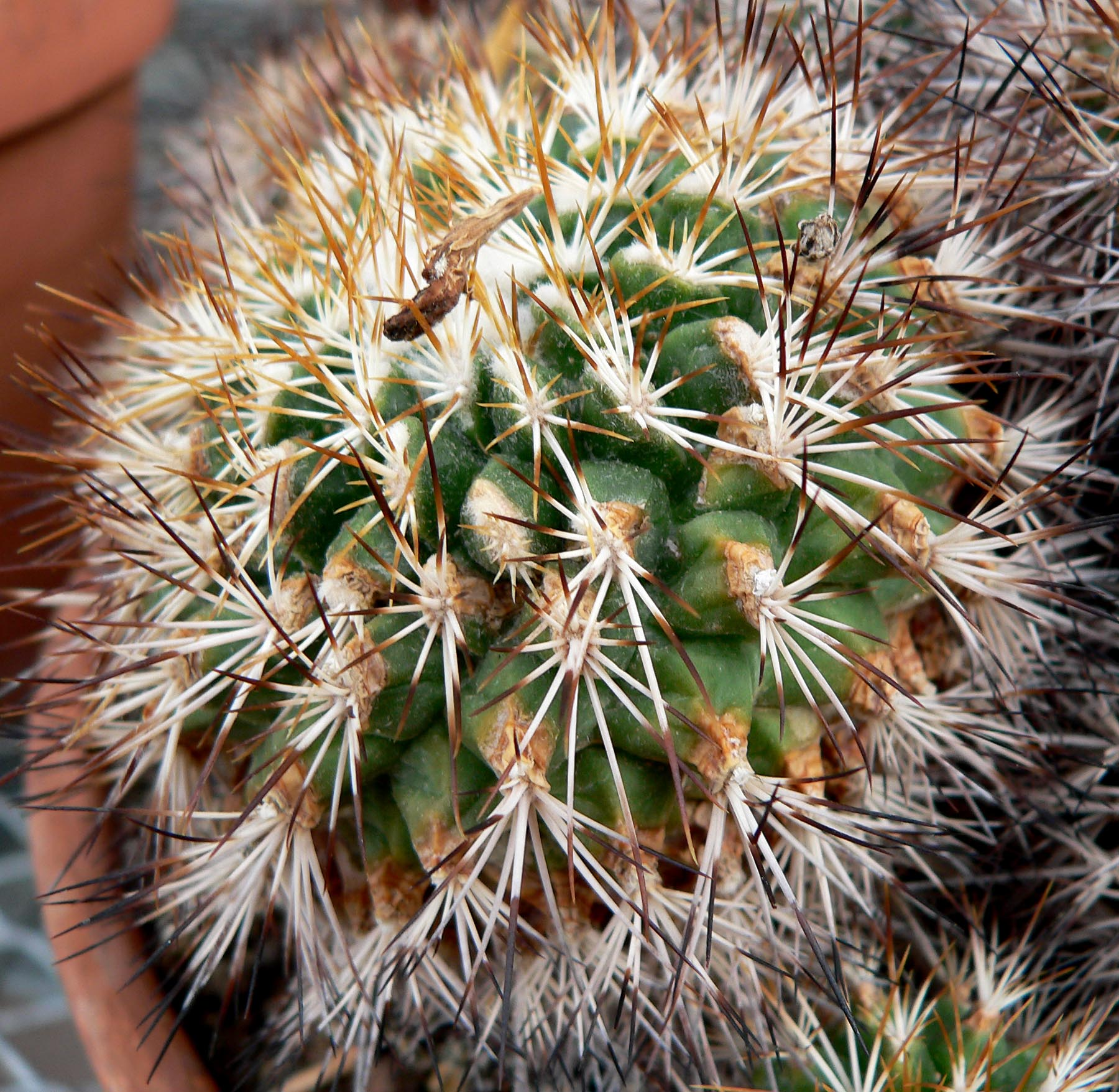

Conservation status
- Endangered (IUCN 3.1)
- CITES Appendix I

Scientific classification
- Kingdom: Plantae
- Clade: Tracheophytes
- Clade: Angiosperms
- Clade: Eudicots
- Order: Caryophyllales
- Family: Cactaceae
- Subfamily: Cactoideae
- Genus: Kadenicarpus
- Species: K. horripilus

Binomial name
- Kadenicarpus horripilus (Lem.) Vázquez-Sánchez

Synonyms
- Bravocactus horripilus (Lem.) Doweld; Echinocactus caespititius Pfeiff. ex Salm-Dyck; Echinocactus horripilus (Lem.) C.F.Först.; Gymnocactus goldii (Bravo) Y.Itô; Gymnocactus horripilus (Lem.) Backeb.; Mammillaria horripila Lem.; Neolloydia horripila (Lem.) Britton & Rose; Pediocactus horripilus (Lem.) Halda; Thelocactus goldii Bravo; Thelocactus horripilus (Lem.) Kladiwa; Turbinicarpus horripilus (Lem.) V.John & Ríha

= Kadenicarpus horripilus =

Species of cactus

Kadenicarpus horripilus is a species of plant in the family Cactaceae.

It is an endangered species, threatened by habitat loss.

== Description ==
Kadenicarpus horripilus often grows sprouting with olive-green, spherical to elongated spherical bodies and fibrous roots. The bodies reach growth heights of 7 to 18 cm (2.8 to 7.1 in) and a diameter of 4 to 6.5 cm (1.6 to 2.6 in). Their clearly pronounced conical cusps are 5 to 7 mm (0.20 to 0.28 in) high. The plant usually a single, protruding, straight, whitish central spine that is dark at the tip. It reaches a length of 12 to 18 mm (0.47 to 0.71 in). The 12 to 14 straight radial spines are white with a dark tip, protruding and 9 to 11 mm (0.35 to 0.43 in) long.

The flowers are magenta with a white throat. They are 2.2 to 3.1 cm (0.87 to 1.22 in) long and have a diameter of 2.5 to 3.5 cm (0.98 to 1.38 in). The elongated, greenish-red fruits turn yellowish-brownish when ripe. They are 4 to 6 mm (0.16 to 0.24 in) long and reach a diameter of 3 to 5 mm (0.12 to 0.20 in).

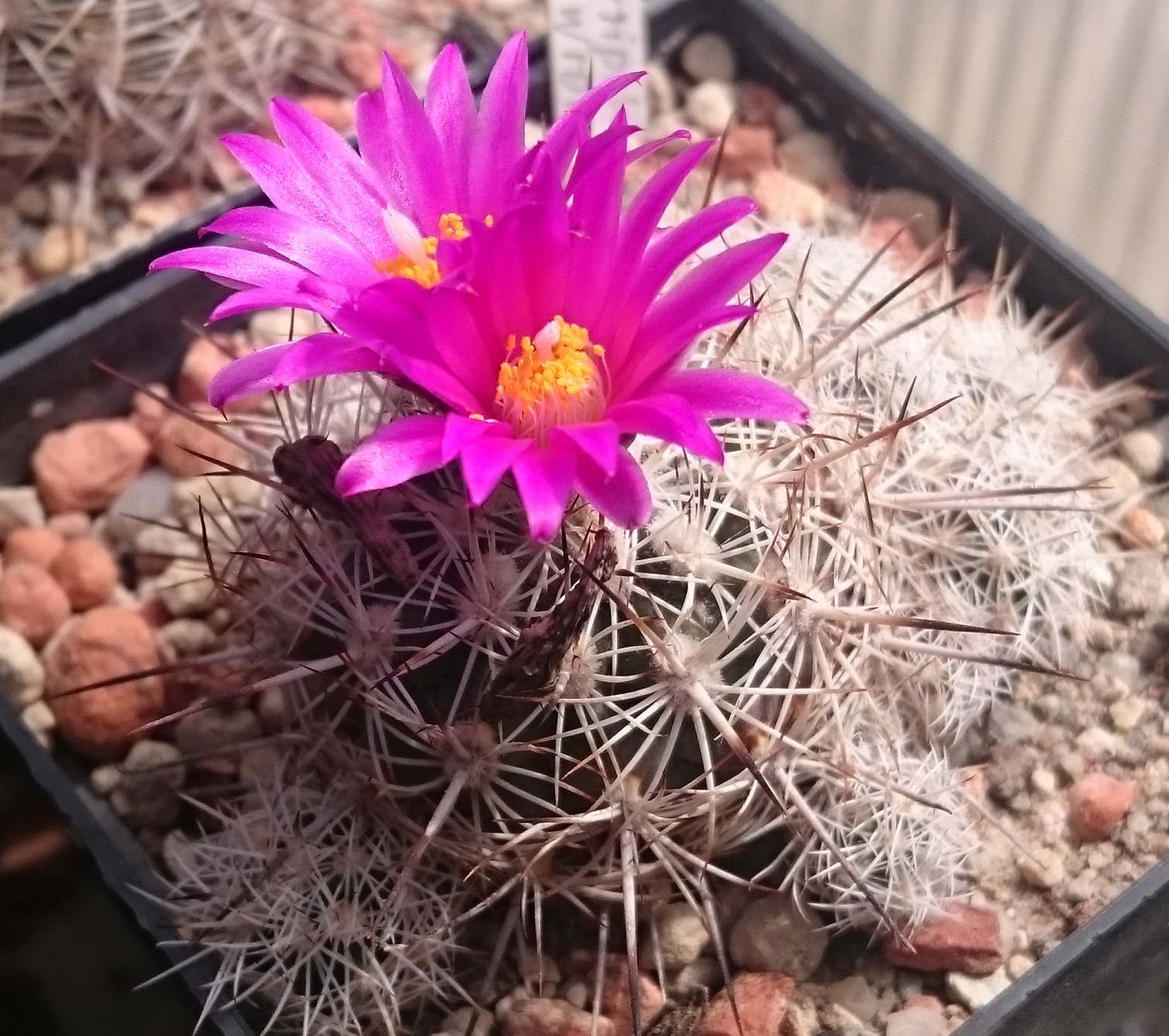
Flowers

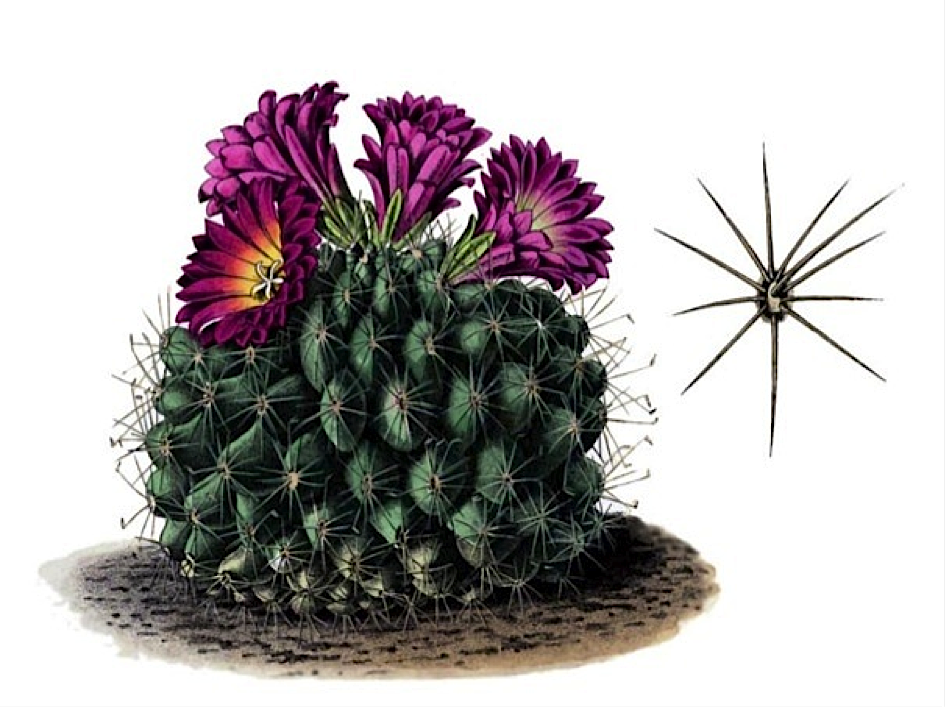
Turbinicarpus horripilus from Blühende Kakteen - Iconographia Cactacearum, Tafel 6

== Distribution ==
It is endemic to Hidalgo state in Mexico. Its natural habitat is hot deserts.

== Taxonomy ==
It was first described as Mammillaria horripila in 1838 by Charles Lemaire. The specific epithet horripilus is derived from the Latin words horrere for 'shudder' and pilus for 'hair' and refers to the thorns of the species. Monserrat Vázquez-Sánchez placed the species in the genus Kadenicarpus in 2019. Further nomenclature synonym are Echinocactus horripilus (Lem.) Lem. (1839), Neolloydia horripila (Lem.) Britton & Rose (1923), Gymnocactus horripilus (Lem. ex C.F.Först.) Backeb. (1951), Thelocactus horripilus (Lem.) Kladiwa (1970), Thelocactus horripilus (Lem.) Kladiwa & Fittkau (1975), Turbinicarpus horripilus (Lem.) V.John & Říha (1983), Bravocactus horripilus (Lem.) ( 1998) and Pediocactus horripilus (Lem.) Halda (1998)
