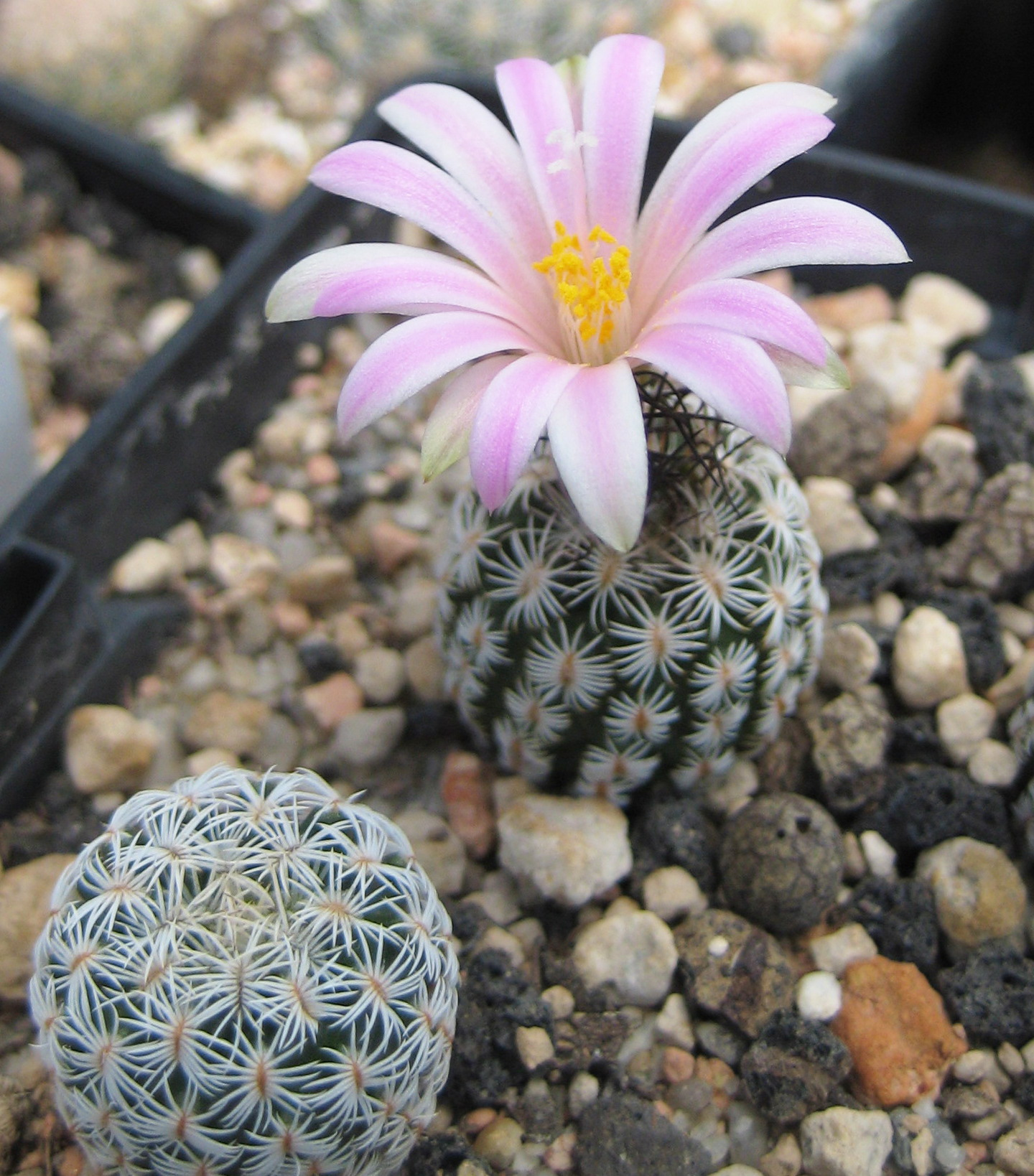

Conservation status
- Endangered (IUCN 3.1)
- CITES Appendix I

Scientific classification
- Kingdom: Plantae
- Clade: Embryophytes
- Clade: Tracheophytes
- Clade: Spermatophytes
- Clade: Angiosperms
- Clade: Eudicots
- Order: Caryophyllales
- Family: Cactaceae
- Subfamily: Cactoideae
- Genus: Kadenicarpus
- Species: K. pseudomacrochele

Binomial name
- Kadenicarpus pseudomacrochele (Backeb.) Doweld

Synonyms
- Neolloydia pseudomacrochele (Backeb.) E.F.Anderson; Pediocactus pseudomacrochele (Backeb.) Halda; Strombocactus pseudomacrochele Backeb.; Toumeya pseudomacrochele (Backeb.) W.T.Marshall; Turbinicarpus pseudomacrochele (Backeb.) Buxb. & Backeb.

= Kadenicarpus pseudomacrochele =

Species of cactus

Kadenicarpus pseudomacrochele, synonym Turbinicarpus pseudomacrochele, is a species of plant in the family Cactaceae.

It is an endangered species, threatened by habitat loss.

== Description ==
Kadenicarpus pseudomacrochele grows mostly singly with light green to darker blue-green, spherical to spherical-cylindrical bodies that occasionally sprout and has a large fleshy turnip root. The bodies, which are woolly at the top, reach heights of 2 to 4 cm (0.79 to 1.57 in) and diameters of 2.5 to 3.4 cm (0.98 to 1.34 in). Their rounded cusps become narrower towards their tip and are 3 to 5 mm (0.12 to 0.20 in) high. There are 5 to 8 yellowish-brown thorns that turn gray with age and cannot be differentiated into marginal and central thorns. They are bristle-like, twisted, mostly stick out and are 15 to 30 mm (0.59 to 1.18 in) long.

The white to reddish purple or yellowish green or magenta flowers are 2.5 to 3.2 cm (0.98 to 1.26 in) long and 2 to 3.5 cm (0.79 to 1.38 in) in diameter. The green, almost spherical fruits are 4 to 6 mm (0.16 to 0.24 in) long.

=== Subspecies ===
Accepted subspecies:

Image	Scientific name	Distribution
	Kadenicarpus pseudomacrochele subsp. pseudomacrochele	NE. Mexico
	Kadenicarpus pseudomacrochele subsp. krainzianus (Gerhart Frank) Vázquez-Sánchez	Mexico (Querétaro, Hidalgo)
	Kadenicarpus pseudomacrochele subsp. minimus (G.Frank) Vázquez-Sánchez	Mexico (Hidalgo)

== Distribution ==
It is endemic to Hidalgo and Querétaro states of Mexico. Its natural habitat is hot deserts.

== Taxonomy ==
The first description as Strombocactus pseudomacrochele was made in 1935 by Curt Backeberg. The specific epithet pseudomacrochele is derived from the Greek word pseudo for 'false' and the similarity to the species Turbinicarpus macrochele. Alexander Borissovitch Doweld placed the species in the genus Kadenicarpus in 1998. Further nomenclature synonym are Turbinicarpus pseudomacrochele (Backeb.) Buxb. & Backeb. (1937), Toumeya pseudomacrochele (Backeb.) W.T.Marshall (1946), Neolloydia pseudomacrochele (Backeb.) E.F.Anderson (1986) and Pediocactus pseudomacrochele (Backeb.) Halda (1998).

== Constituents ==
In terms of total alkaloid content, Kadenicarpus pseudomacrochele contains 49.6% hordenine, 2.5% mescaline, 2.4% anhalonidine, and 0.4% pellotine. For comparison, Lophophora williamsii (peyote) contains 30% mescaline, 17% pellotine, 14% anhalonidine, and 8% hordenine, among other alkaloids.
