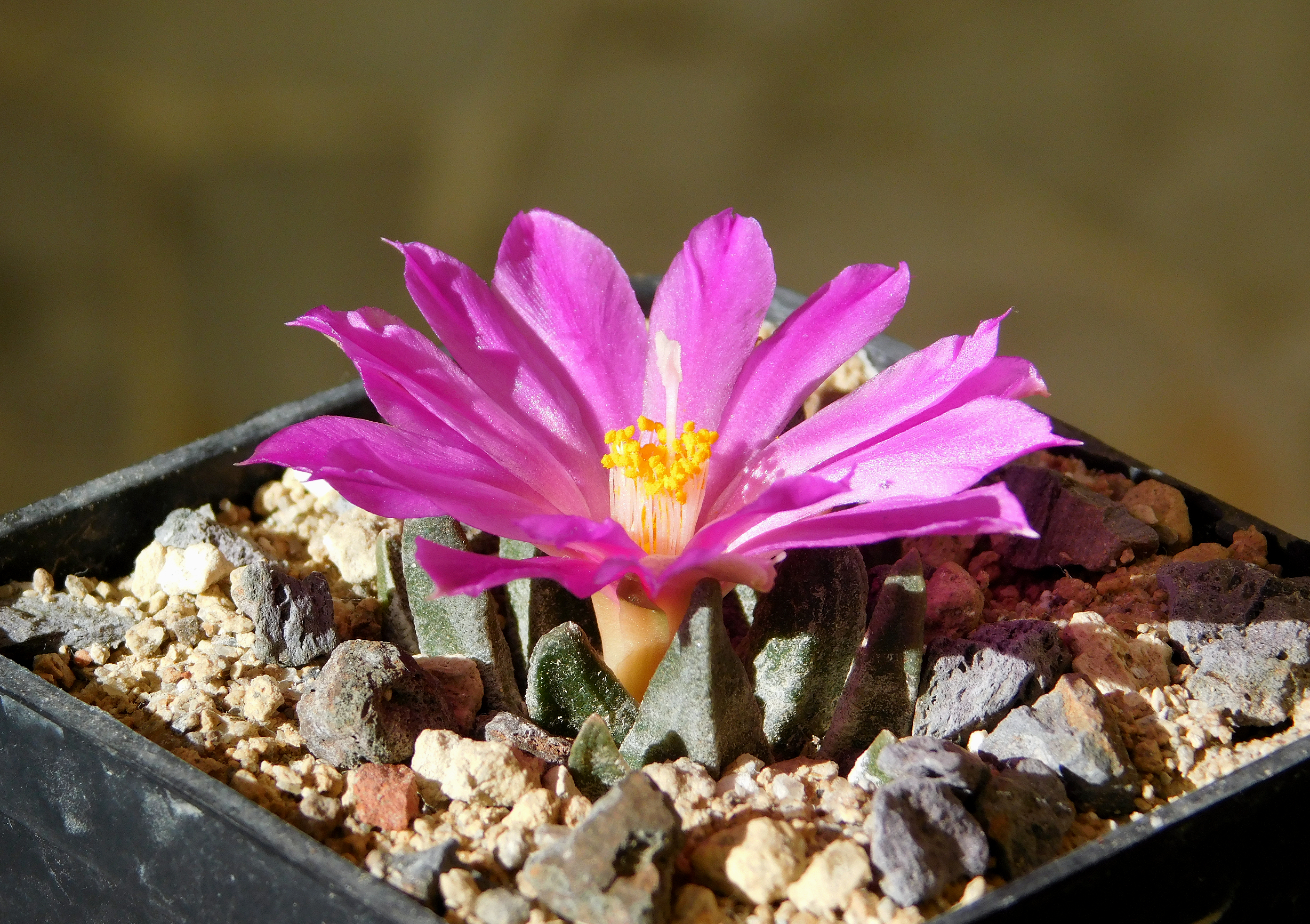

Conservation status
- Endangered (IUCN 3.1)
- CITES Appendix I

Scientific classification
- Kingdom: Plantae
- Clade: Tracheophytes
- Clade: Angiosperms
- Clade: Eudicots
- Order: Caryophyllales
- Family: Cactaceae
- Subfamily: Cactoideae
- Genus: Ariocarpus
- Species: A. scaphirostris

Binomial name
- Ariocarpus scaphirostris Boed.

Synonyms
- Ariocarpus scaphirostrus var. swobodae Halda, Horáček & Panar. 1998

= Ariocarpus scaphirostris =

Species of cactus

Ariocarpus scaphirostris is a species of plant in the family Cactaceae. It was originally called Ariocarpus scapharostrus in the 1930s.

== Description ==
Ariocarpus scaphirostris grows geophytically with dark green to brown bodies, 4 to 9 centimeters in diameter, with only the warts protruding from the soil surface. The warts are somewhat triangular in cross-section, spreading, pointed, and more than twice as long as they are wide. Areoles are absent or located near the tip of the warts.

The plant is slow growing and also produces rare flowers. The magenta flowers reach a diameter of 4 centimeters, and the greenish fruits are 9 to 15 millimeters long.

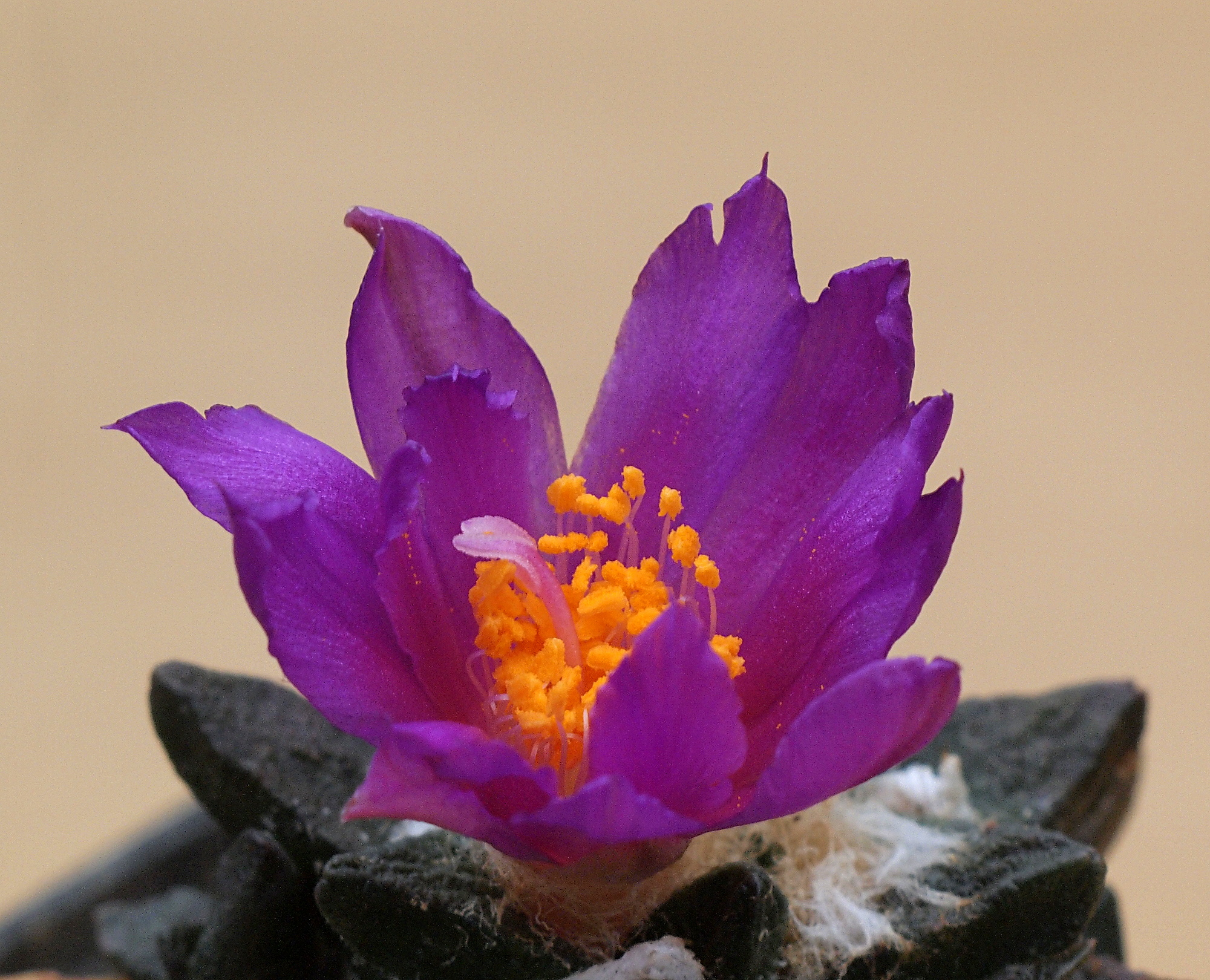
Flower

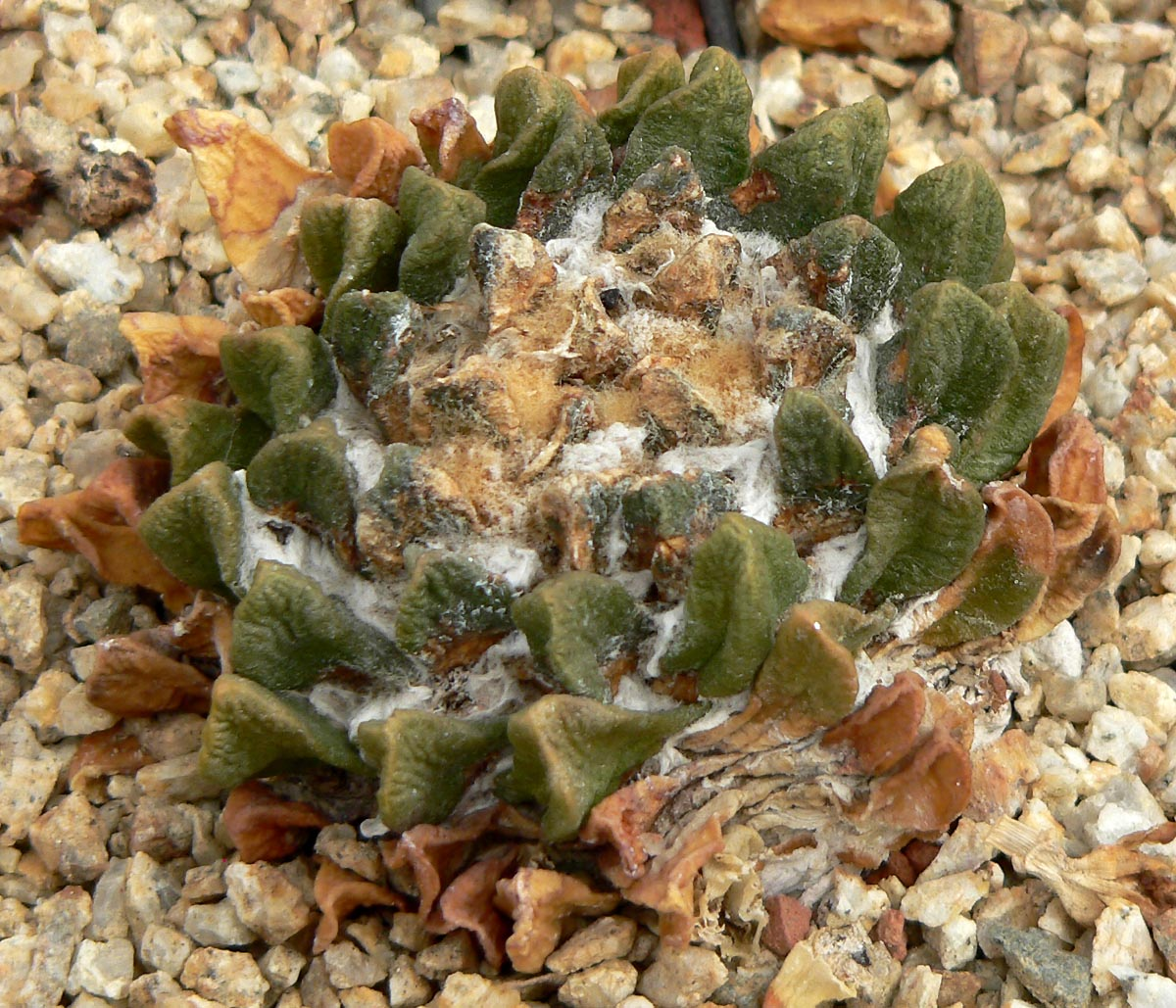
Plant

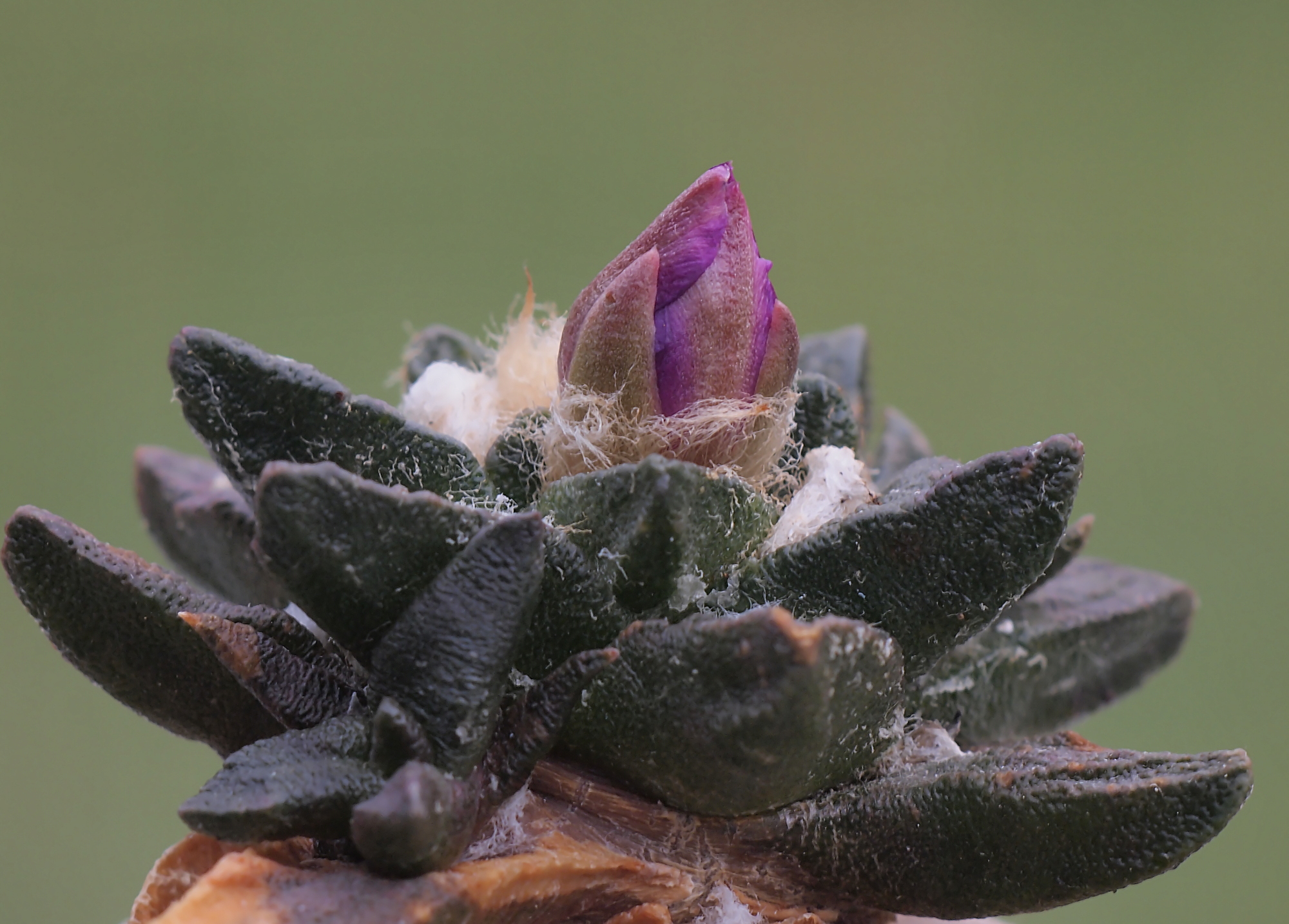
Side view of plant

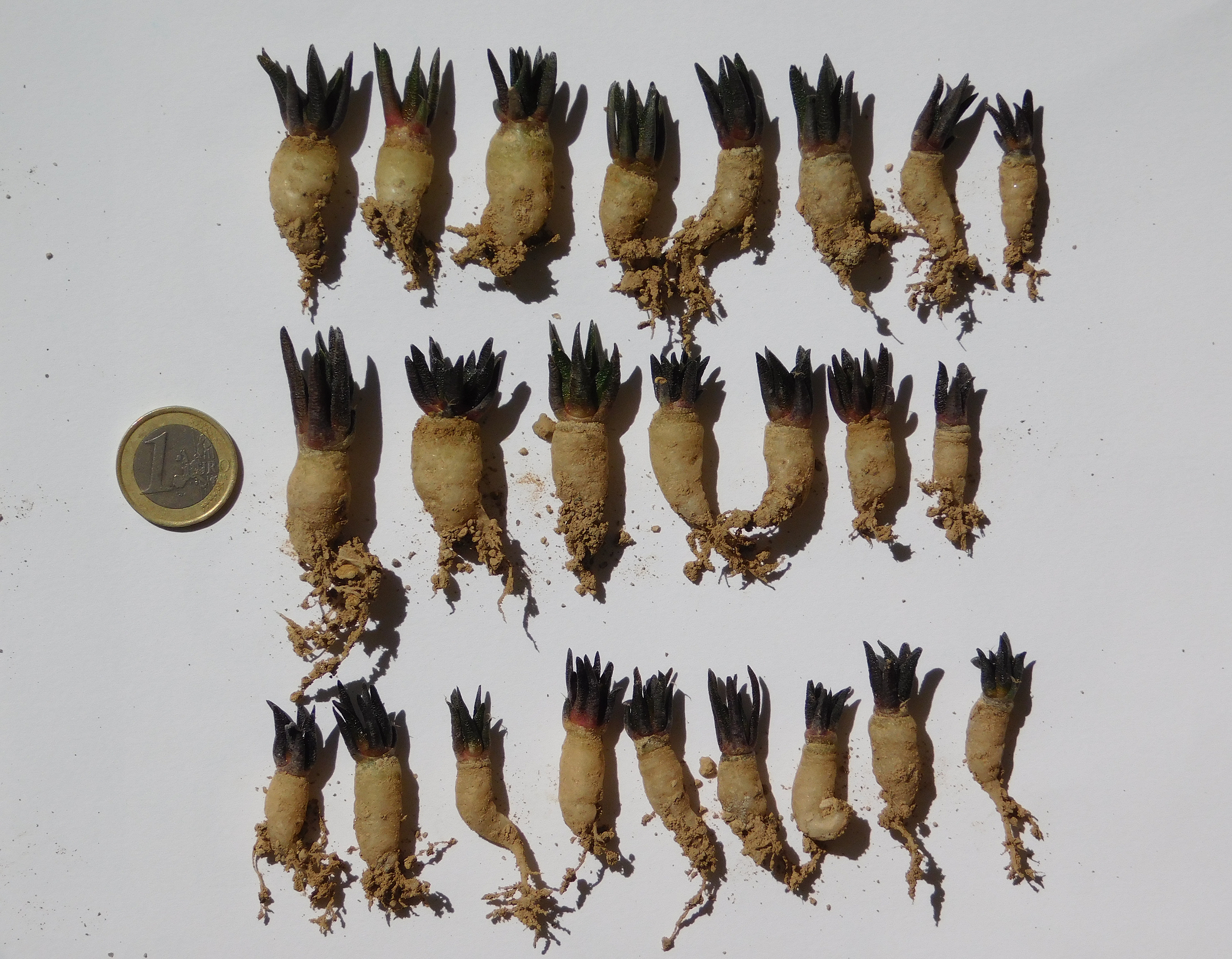
seedlings

== Distribution ==
Ariocarpus scaphirostris is endemic to hot deserts gowning on shaly limestone in a single valley in Nuevo León, Mexico, at elevations between 950 and 1,400 meters.

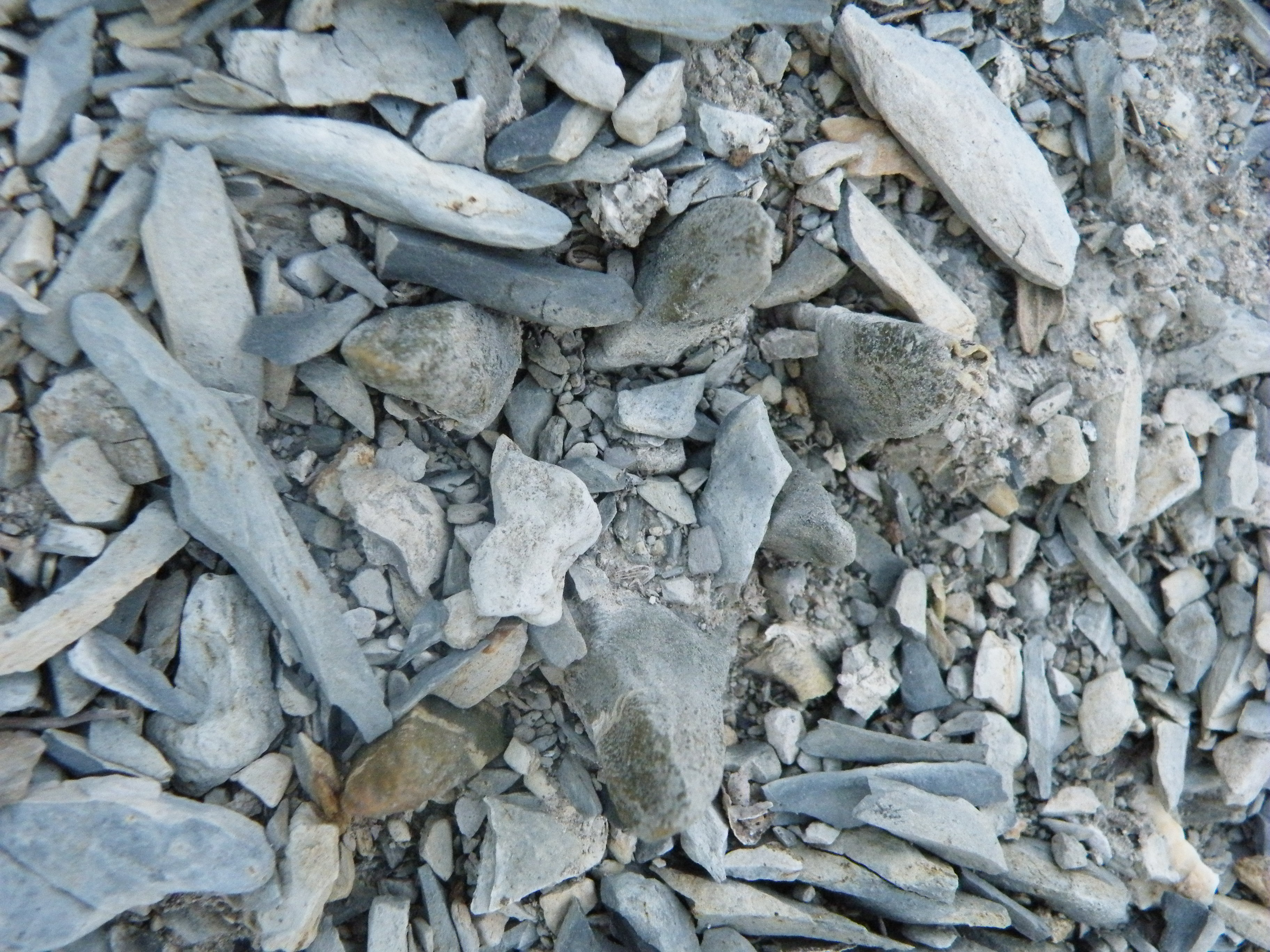
Plant growing in Rayones, Nuevo León under limestone.

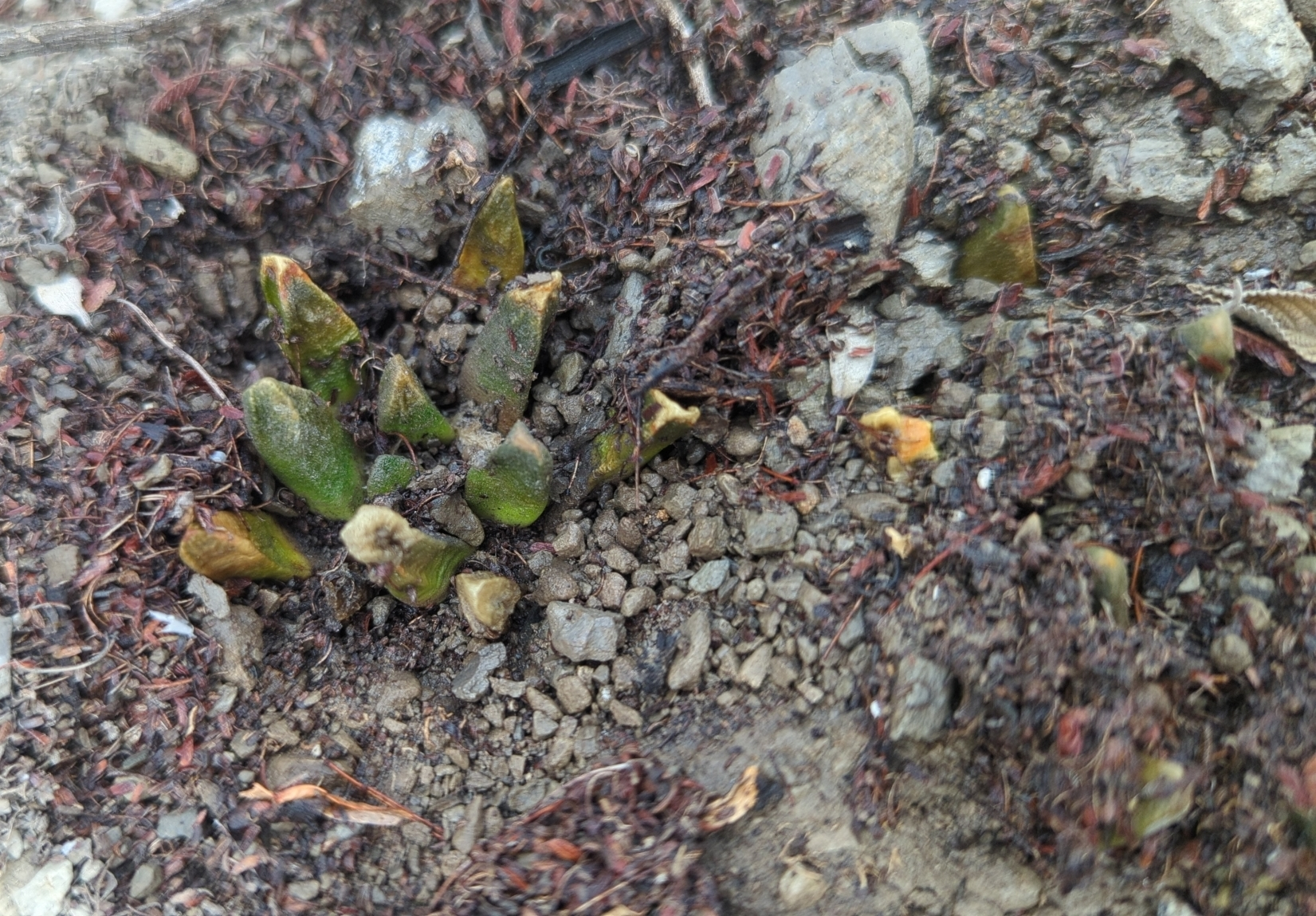
Habitat in Las Kanjadas, Nuevo Leon, Mexico

== Taxonomy ==
First described in 1930 by Friedrich Bödeker, the specific epithet "scaphirostris" is derived from the Greek "skaphe" (ship) and the Latin "rostrum" (beak), referring to the shape of the wart tips. Bödeker's original spelling, "Ariocarpus scapharostrus," was corrected by D. R. Hunt, in 1991 to comply with Article 61.1 of the International Code of Botanical Nomenclature.

== Pharmacology ==
Hordenine, N-methyltyramine, N-methyl-3,4-dimethoxy-β-phenethylamine and N,N-dimethyl-3,4-dimethoxy-β-phenethylamine were found in Ariocarpus scaphirostris.
