= The Humane Society (band) =

American garage rock band

- Origin: Simi Valley, California, United States
- Genres: Garage rock; psychedelic rock; proto-punk
- Years active: 1965-1968
- Labels: Liberty, New World
- Past members: Danny Wheetman; Jim Pettit; Woody Minnich; Richard Majewski; Bill Schnetzler

The Humane Society were an American garage rock band from Simi Valley, California who were active from 1965 through 1968, who are best known for their 1967 protopunk anthem, "Knock Knock."

The Humane Society formed in Simi Valley, California in 1965 as the Innocents. Their lineup consisted of Danny Wheetman on vocals and rhythm guitar, Jim Pettit on lead guitar, Woody Minnich on rhythm guitar, Richard Majewski on bass, Bill Schnetzler on drums. Producers Dick Torst and Dick Parker discovered the band while performing on a flatbed truck parked next to a local record store. They recorded their first single for Liberty Records in the spring of 1967, "Tiptoe Through the Tulips With Me," now as the Humane Society, which pre-dated Tiny Tim's 1968 smash hit rendition of the novelty song. The flip side, "Knock, Knock," however, is a study in contrasts and is a menacing and provocatively delivered slab of protopunk which has become the song for which the group is best known. The song features Danny Wheetman's furious ranting vocals, set to a backing which leads up to a violent high-speed rave-up. After Liberty rejected a proposed follow-up, the Humane Society signed with New World Records for their second single, "Lorna" which was released in 1968. However, the record received little airplay and went nowhere. The band dissolved shortly thereafter. "Knock Knock" appeared on the Nuggets box set, released in 1998. In Mike Markesich's, Teenbeat Mayhem, based on a balloting of noted garage rock writers and experts, the song "Knock Knock" receives a ranking of ten and is listed at #214 on that book's list of 1000 greatest garage rock records of all time.

== Membership ==
- Danny Wheetman (vocals and rhythm guitar)
- Jim Pettit (lead guitar)
- Woody Minnich (rhythm guitar)
- Richard Majewski (bass)
- Bill Schnetzler (drums)

== Discography ==
- "Tiptoe Through the Tulips with Me" b/w "Knock, Knock" (Liberty 55968, April 1967)
- "Lorna" b/w "Eternal Prison" (New World 2004, November 1968)
