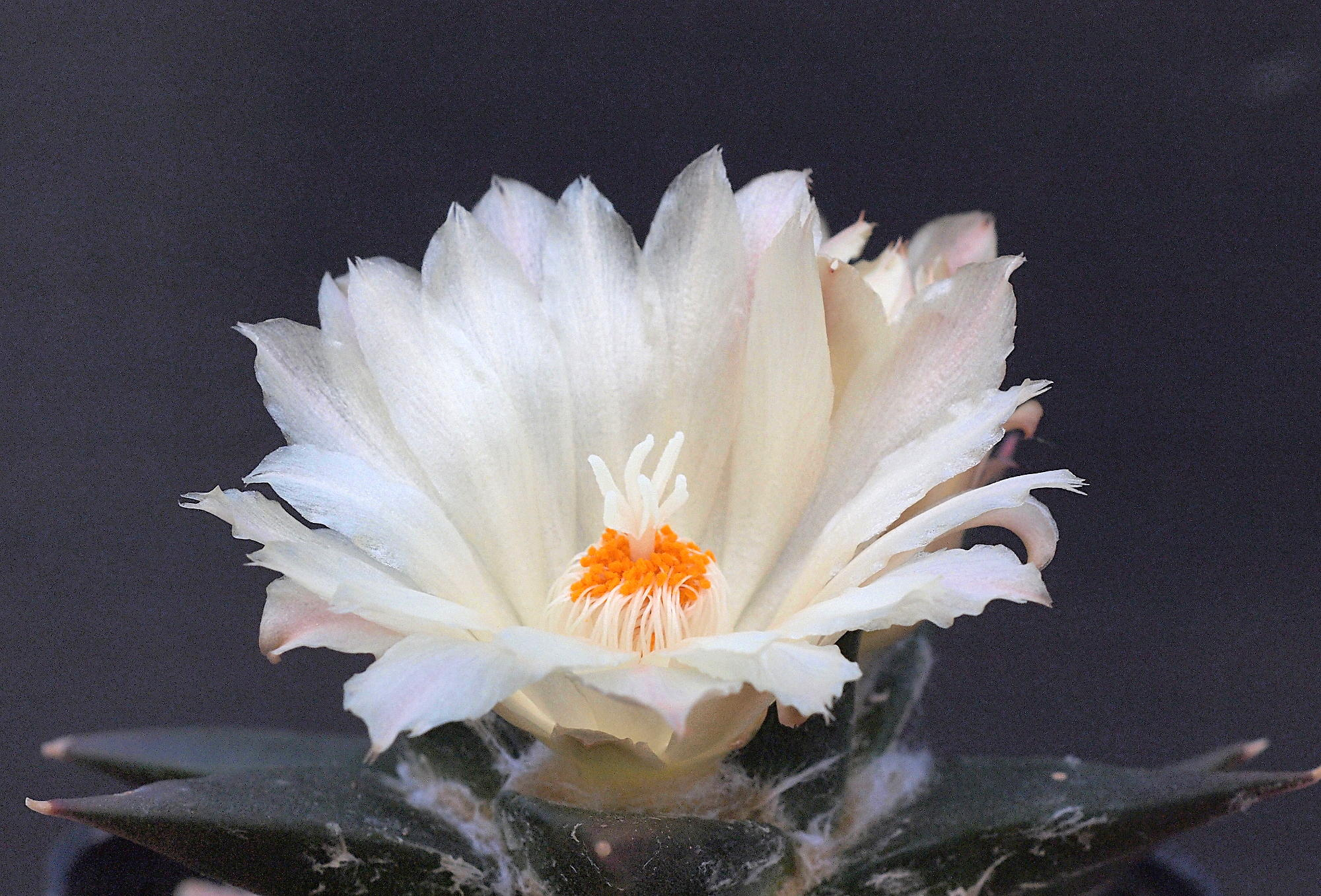

Conservation status
- CITES Appendix I

Scientific classification
- Kingdom: Plantae
- Clade: Tracheophytes
- Clade: Angiosperms
- Clade: Eudicots
- Order: Caryophyllales
- Family: Cactaceae
- Subfamily: Cactoideae
- Genus: Ariocarpus
- Species: A. trigonus

Binomial name
- Ariocarpus trigonus (F.A.C.Weber) K.Schum.

Synonyms
- Anhalonium trigonum F.A.C.Weber; Ariocarpus retusus subsp. trigonus (F.A.C.Weber) E.F.Anderson & W.A.Fitz Maur.; Ariocarpus trigonus var. minor Voldan

= Ariocarpus trigonus =

Species of cactus

Ariocarpus trigonus or better known as Landmine Flowers is a species of flowering plant in the family Cactaceae, native to Mexico (the states of Tamaulipas and Nuevo León).

== Description ==
Ariocarpus trigonus grows as a solitary plant, reaching up to 30 cm in diameter, though older plants can form groups. The plant features numerous shiny brownish-gray-green warts that are curved, acutely triangular on one side, and sharply keeled backward to the base. These warts are 3 to 8 cm long and 1.5 to 2.5 cm wide at the base, with barely visible areoles on their slightly broken tips.

The plant has a very thick beet-like root. Its numerous yellowish flowers, up to 50 mm long and wide, form a wreath around the woolly crown.

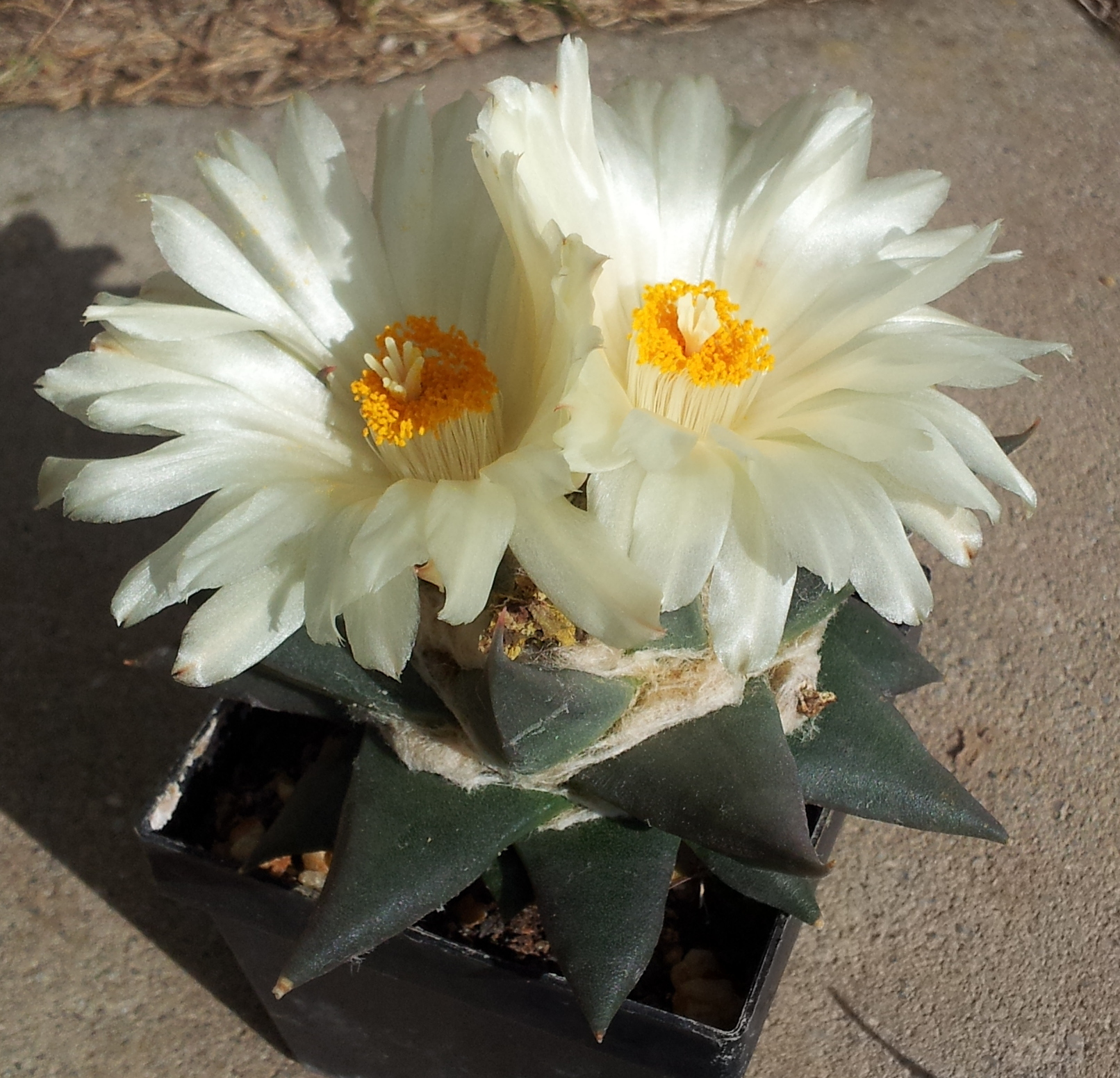
Flowers

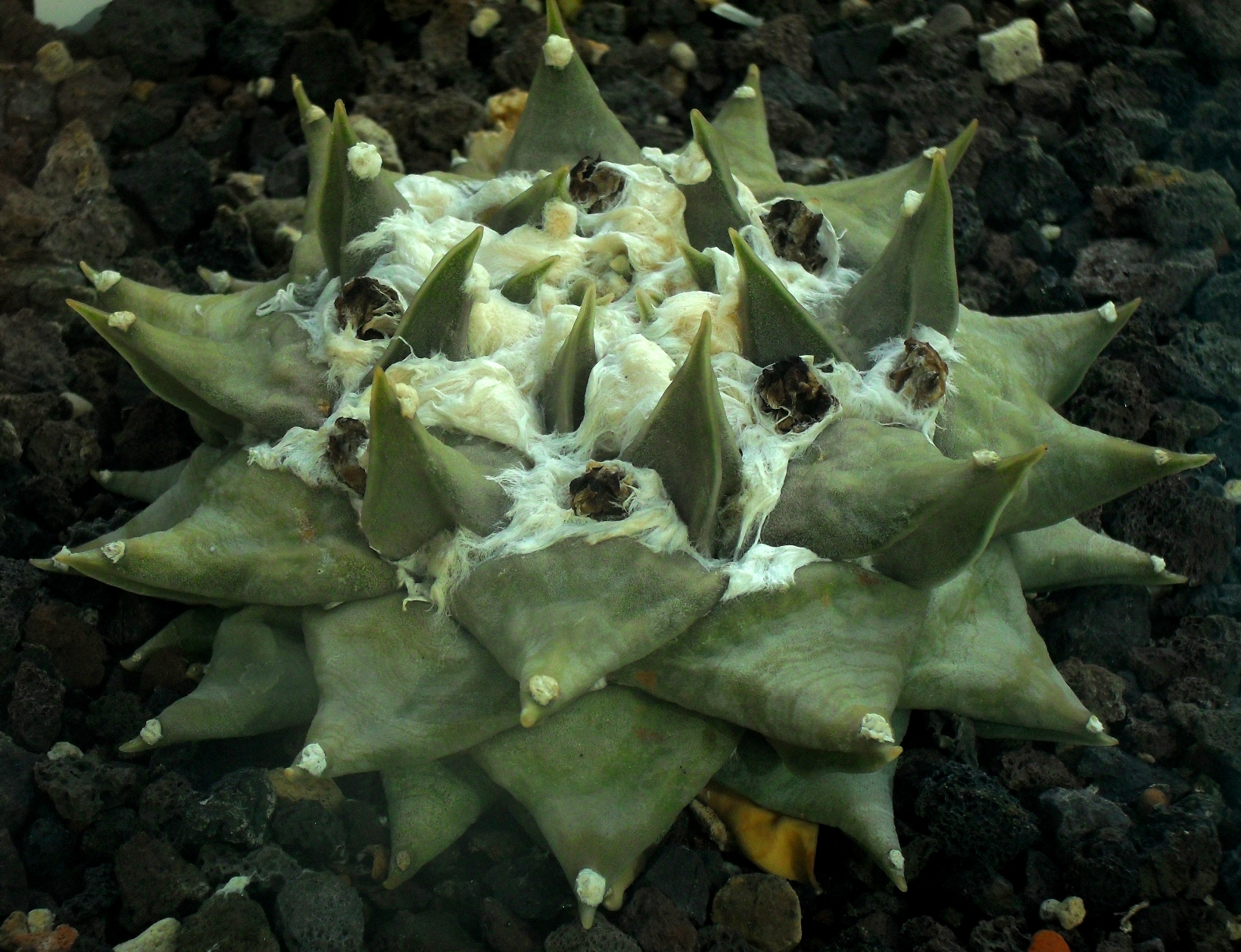
Plant

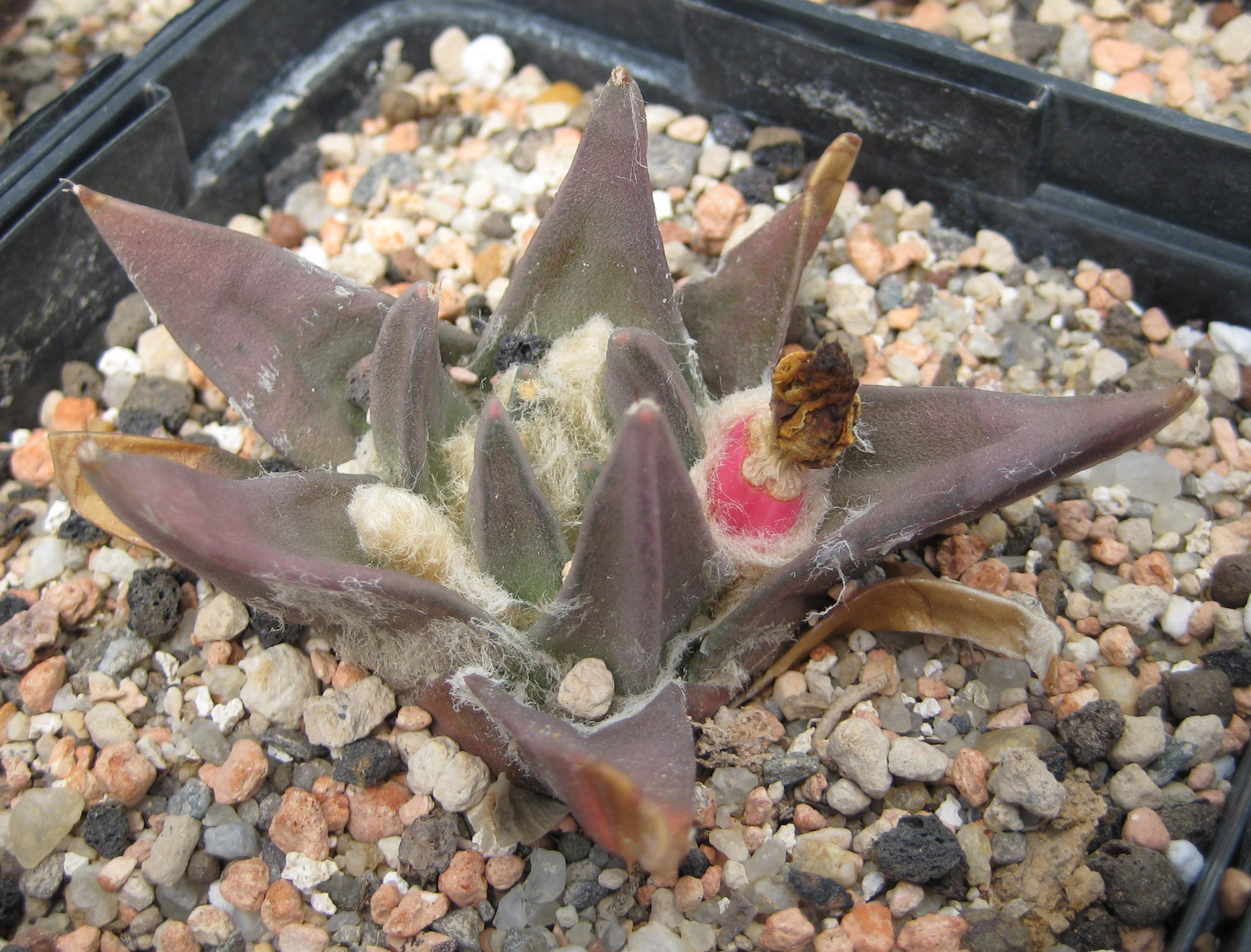
Fruit

== Distribution and habitat ==
Ariocarpus trigonus is native to the Mexican states of Nuevo León and Tamaulipas. It is found on the eastern slopes of the Sierra Madre Oriental, north of Monterrey, between Montemorelos and Linares, and in the Jaumave valley south of Jaumave. It grows on flat limestone hilltops in coarse, sandy-gravelly soil at altitudes between 500 and 1,200 meters.

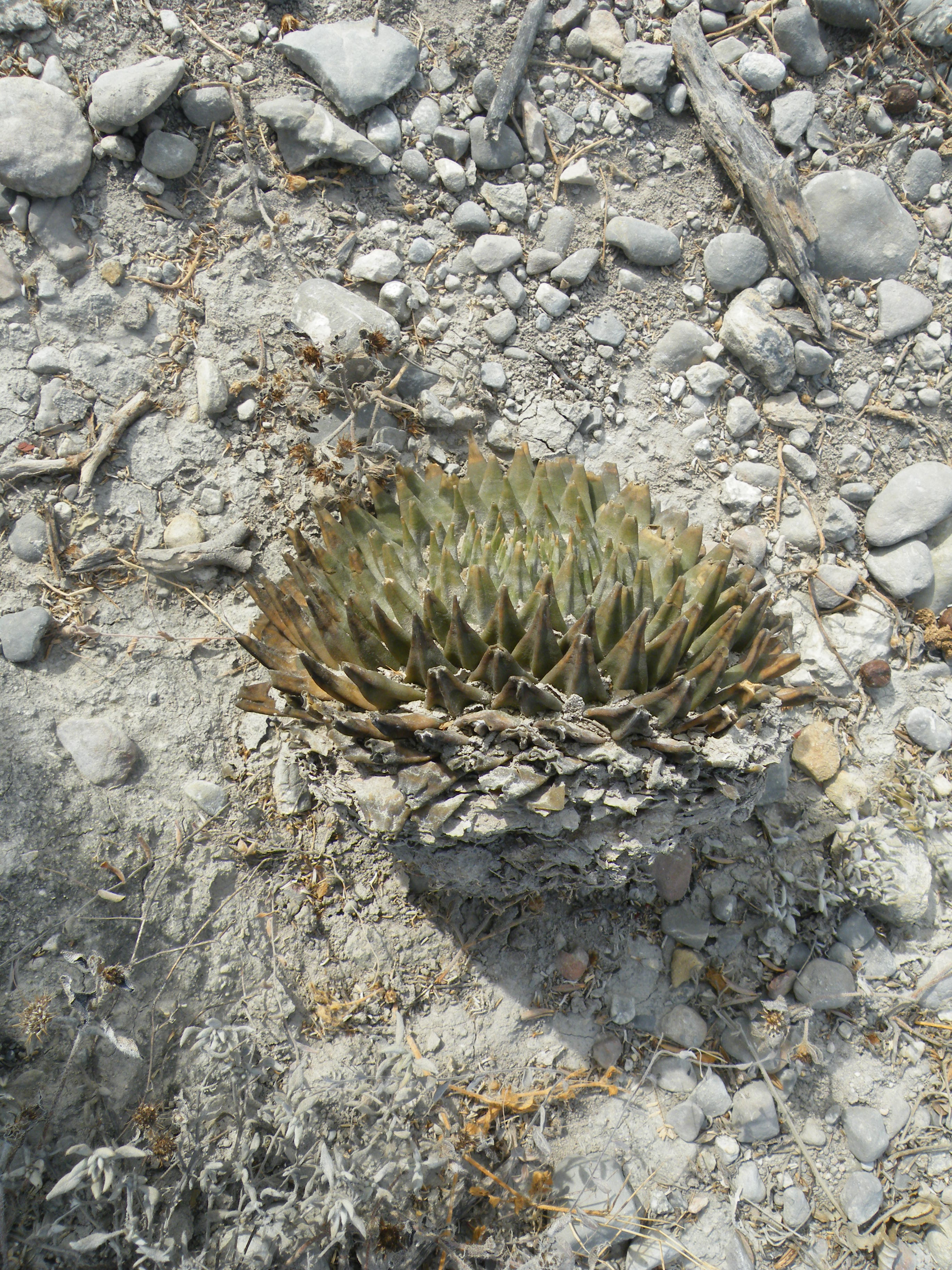
Plant growing in San Jose De Salamanca, Tamaulipas

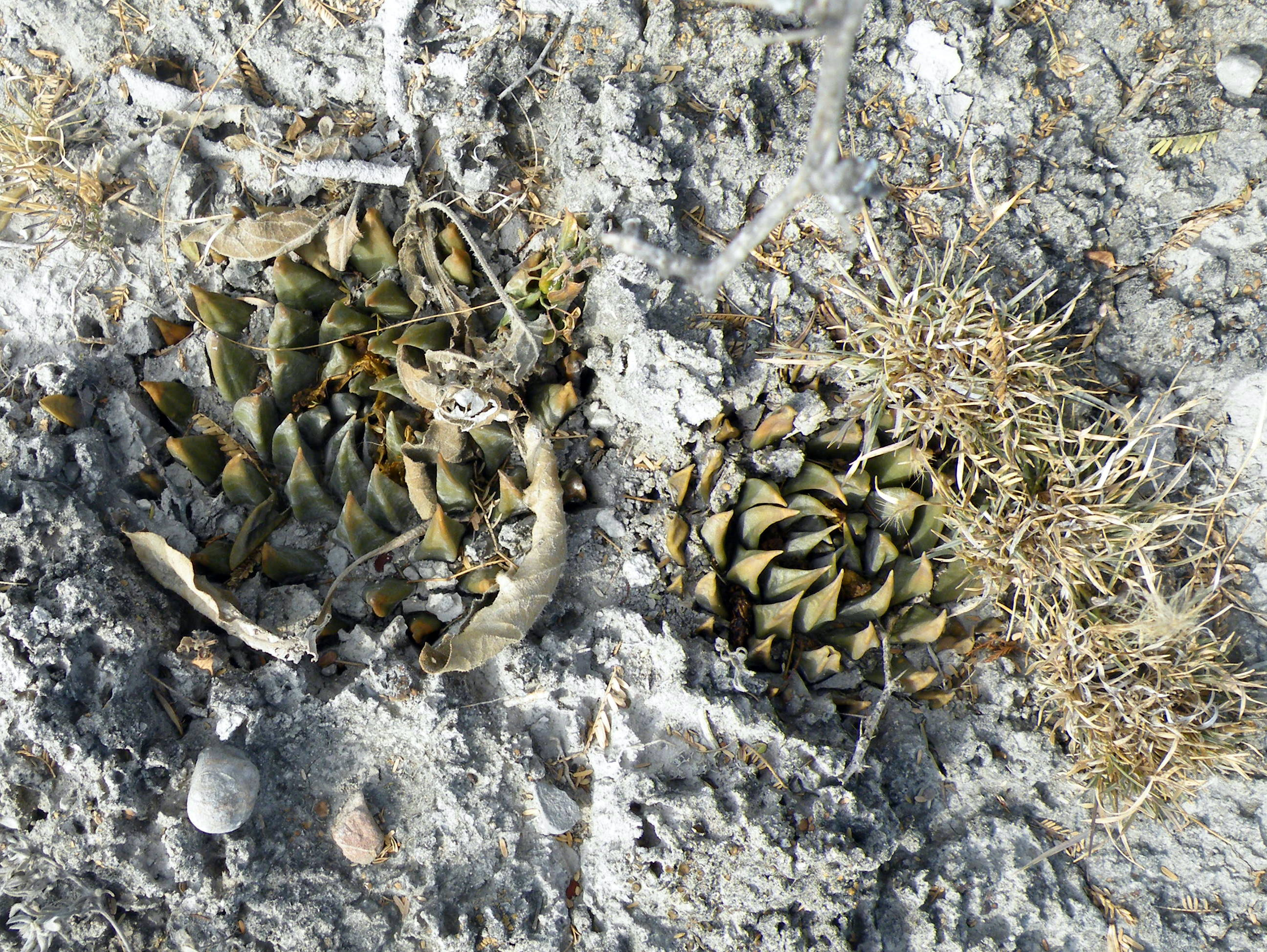

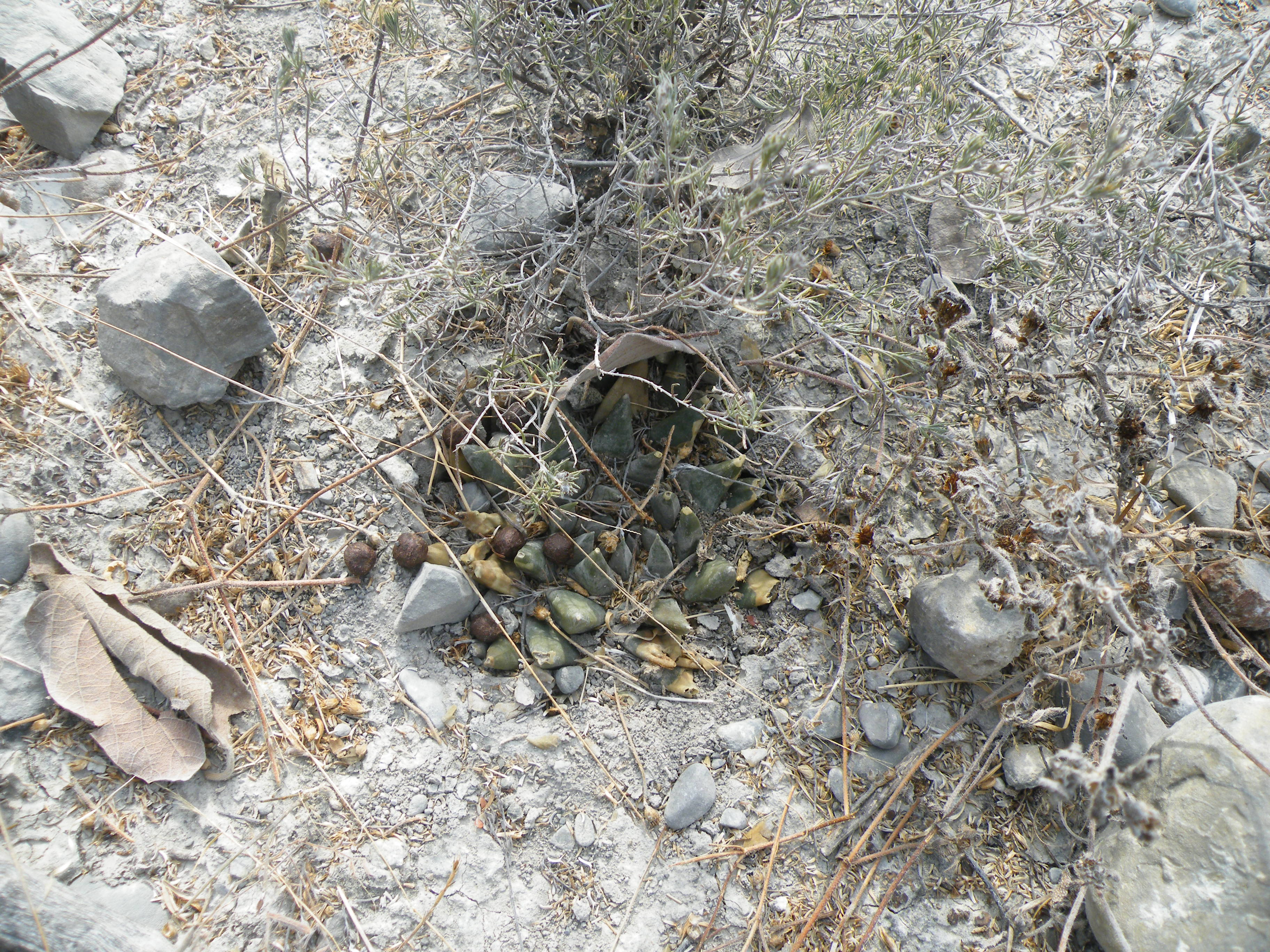

== Taxonomy ==
First described as Anhalonium trigonum by Frédéric Albert Constantin Weber in 1893, the species was placed in the genus Ariocarpus by Karl Moritz Schumann in 1898. The specific epithet "trigonus" is Greek for "triangular," referring to the shape of the warts.
