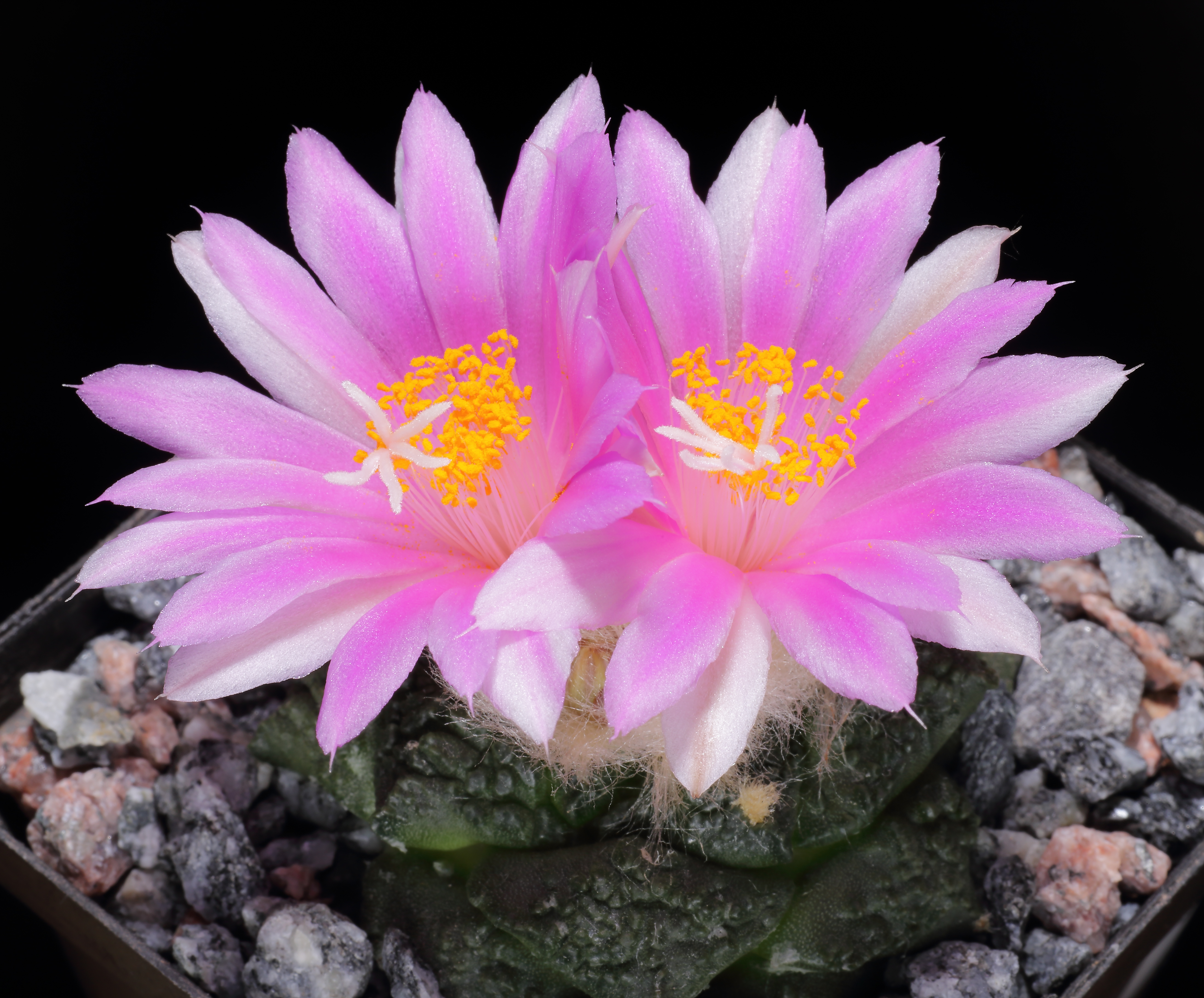

Conservation status
- Least Concern (IUCN 3.1)
- CITES Appendix I

Scientific classification
- Kingdom: Plantae
- Clade: Tracheophytes
- Clade: Angiosperms
- Clade: Eudicots
- Order: Caryophyllales
- Family: Cactaceae
- Subfamily: Cactoideae
- Genus: Ariocarpus
- Species: A. fissuratus

Binomial name
- Ariocarpus fissuratus (Engelm.) K.Schum.

Synonyms
- Mammillaria fissurata Engelm.; Roseocactus fissuratus (Engelm.) A.Berger; Roseocactus intermedius Backeb. & Kilian

= Ariocarpus fissuratus =

Species of cactus

Ariocarpus fissuratus (formerly known as Anhalonium fissuratus) is a species of cactus found in small numbers in northern Mexico and Texas in the United States. Common names include living rock cactus, false peyote, chautle, dry whiskey and star cactus.

== Description ==
This cactus, flattened to spherical bodies 1.5 to 10 cm high and up to 10 (rarely up to 15) cm in diameter, consists of many small tubercles growing from a large succulent tap root. They are usually solitary, almost always remain unbranched, rarely giving rise to side shoots from old areoles. The plant is greyish-green in color, but the flat forms in particular acquire a yellowish to brownish tint with age. Its growth rate is extremely slow. The spirally distributed warts are flattened, triangular to rhombic and sometimes overlap. The horny, hardened upper surface of each wart is almost completely split and furrowed transversely by a pronounced furrow that connects the areole and axilla. Due to the wool emerging from the furrows, which is initially straw-blond, then darkens and finally grays, the tops of the plants are well protected and usually hidden from view. Sooner (in nature) or later (in culture) the wool is shed, so that the furrows of older warts are almost bare. Thorns are not formed. A. fissuratus is naturally camouflaged in its habitat, making it difficult to spot. When they are found, it is usually due to their pinkish flowers which bloom in October and early November. The flowers develop individually from the youngest areole furrows, so they are almost centrally located. They are light purple to pinkish red with a darker throat and reach a diameter of about 2.5 to 4.5 cm. The pollen is orange-colored, the five to ten-rayed and tiny pinnate stigmas above the stamens are almost white. After fertilization, spindle- to club-shaped, greenish to white fruits 5 to 15 mm long and 2 to 6 mm in diameter are formed. These dry out when ripe and release the dull black seeds into the crown wool, from which they are only washed out (in nature) after a long time.

In its natural habitat, the flattened and yellowish form in particular can hardly be recognized as a plant due to its semi-subterranean growth and the jagged warts (mimesis).

The chromosome count is 2n=22.

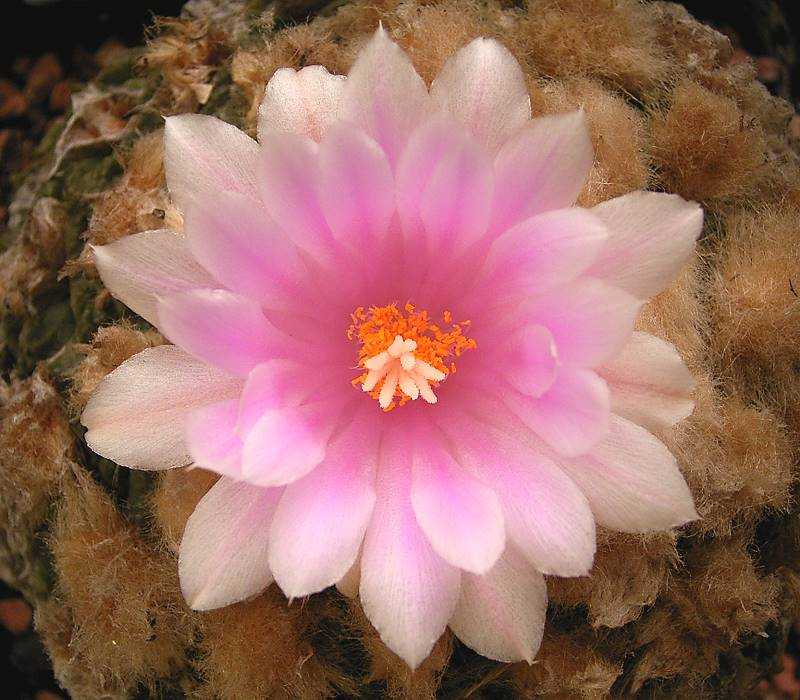

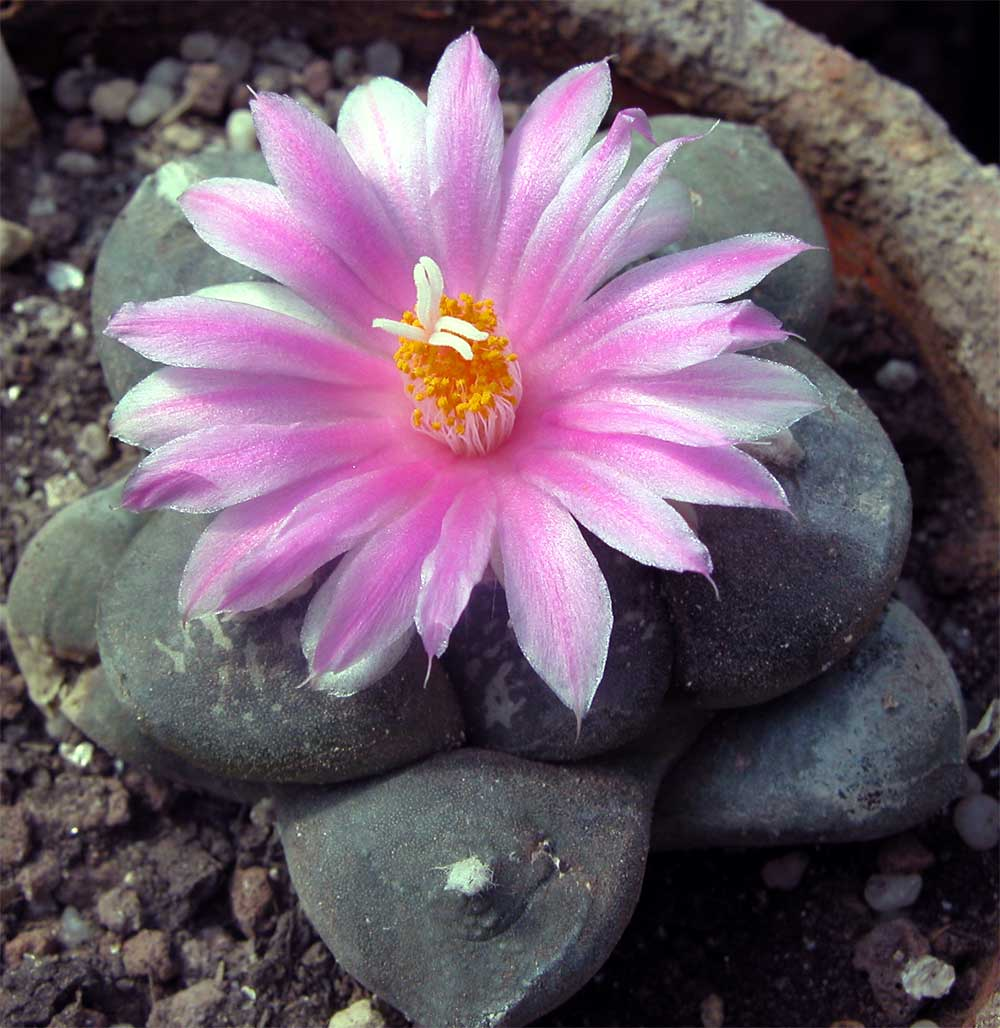
Flower

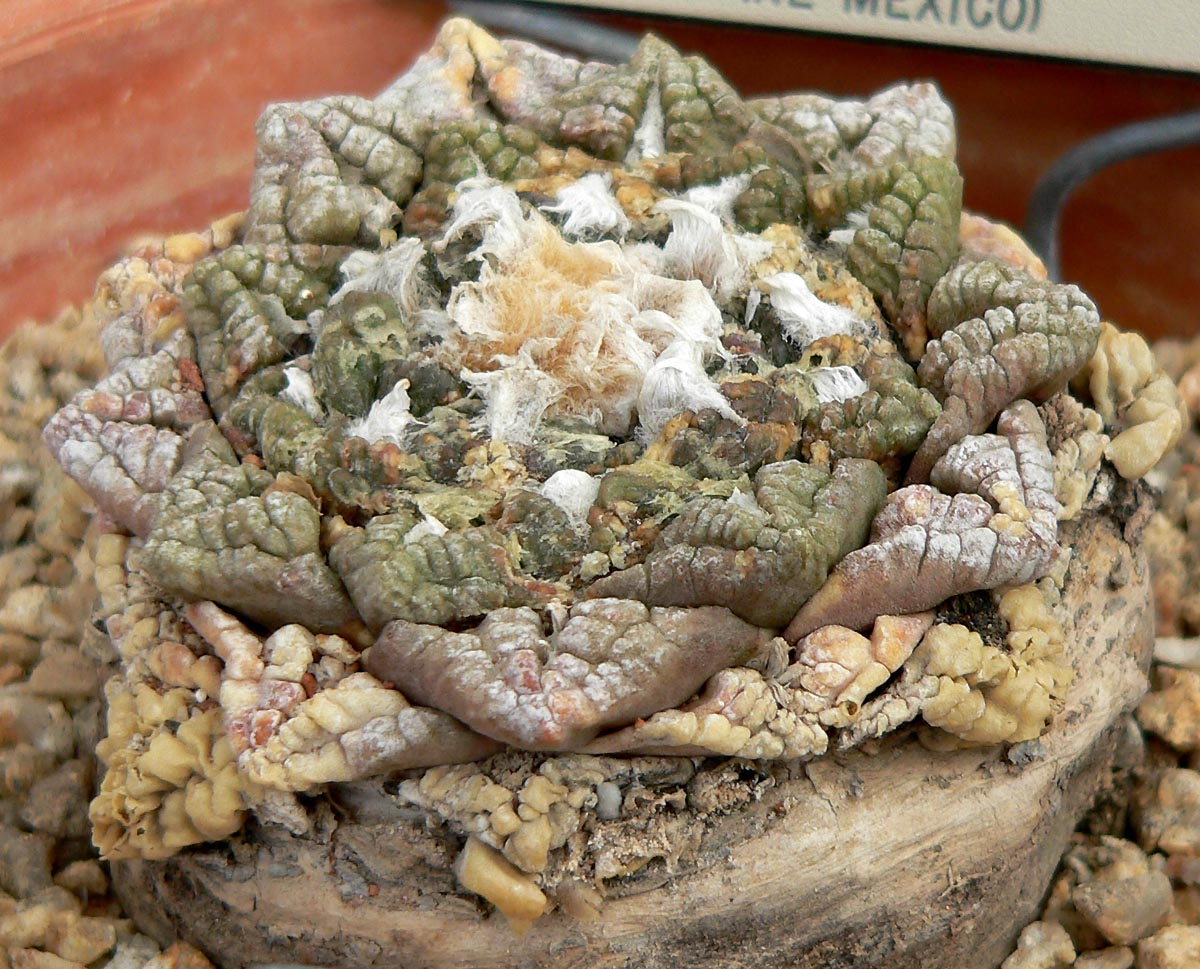
plant

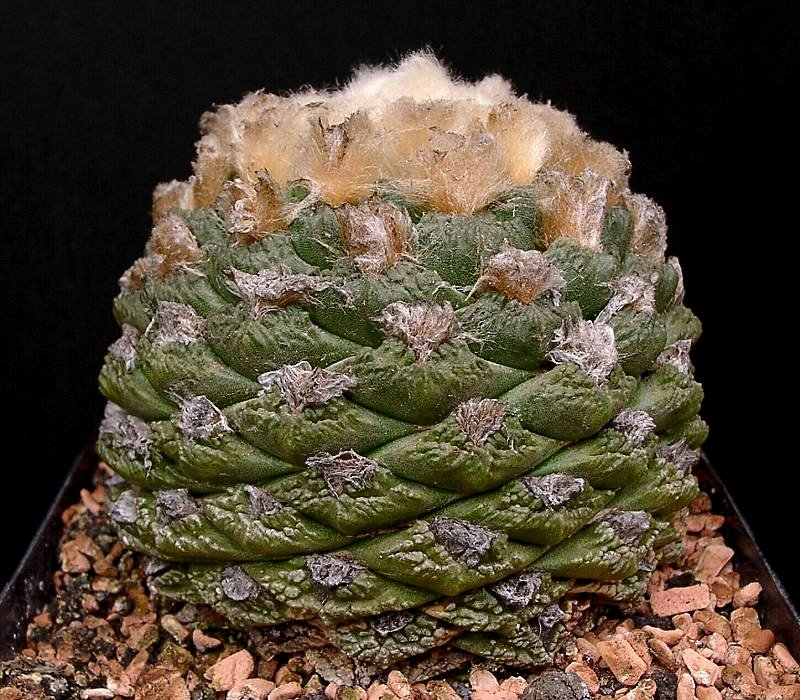
Plant

== Distribution ==
Ariocarpus fissuratus is widespread in southwest Texas from southeastern Hudspeth County to the Pecos River and in the Mexican states of Coahuila, Chihuahua, Durango, Nuevo León, Tamaulipas, and Zacatecas at elevations around 500 and 1,170 meters. Plants grow on dry limestone plains, ridges and low, rocky hills of limestone chips.

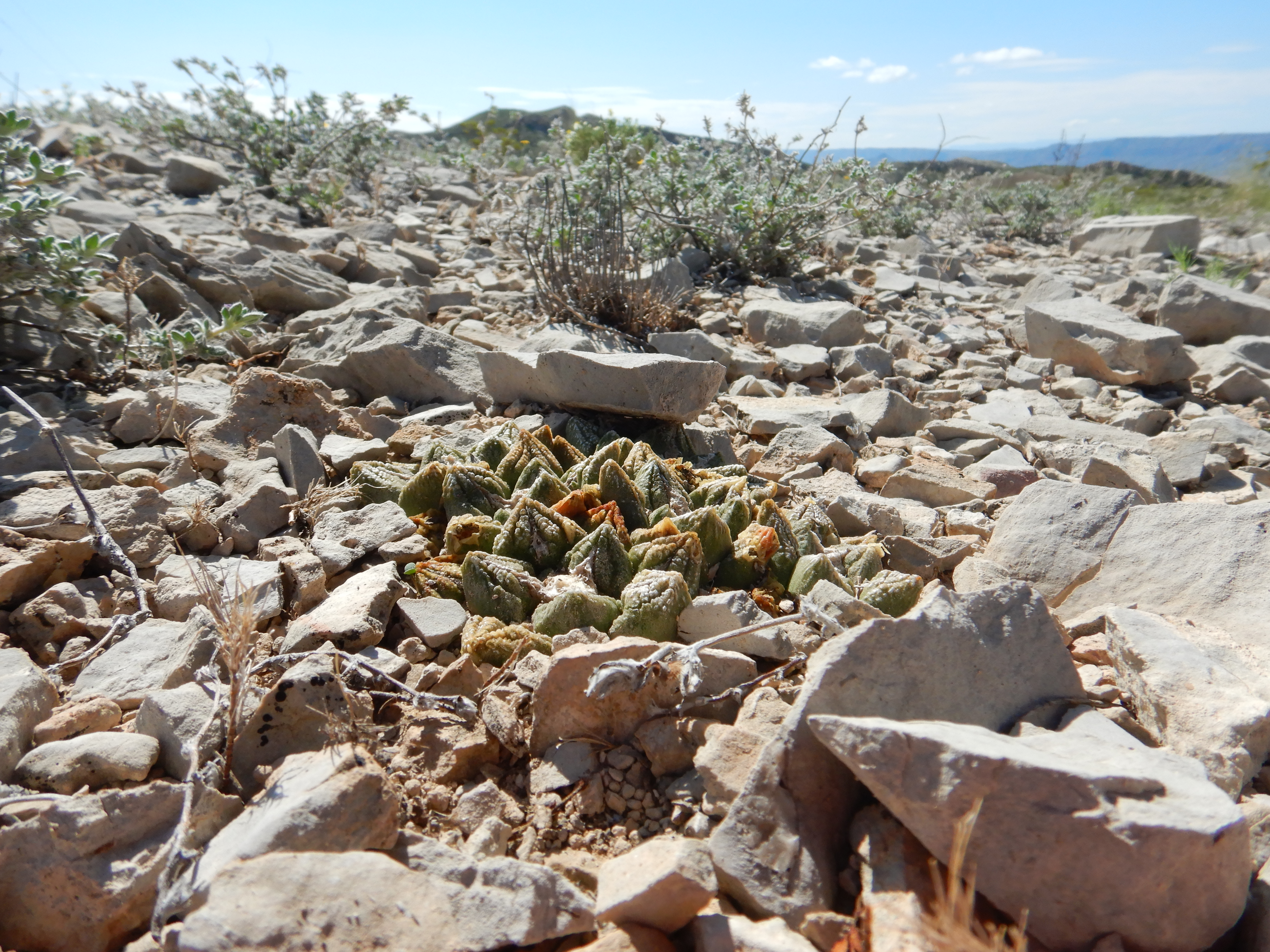
Plant growing in habitat in Big Bend area of Brewster County, Texas.

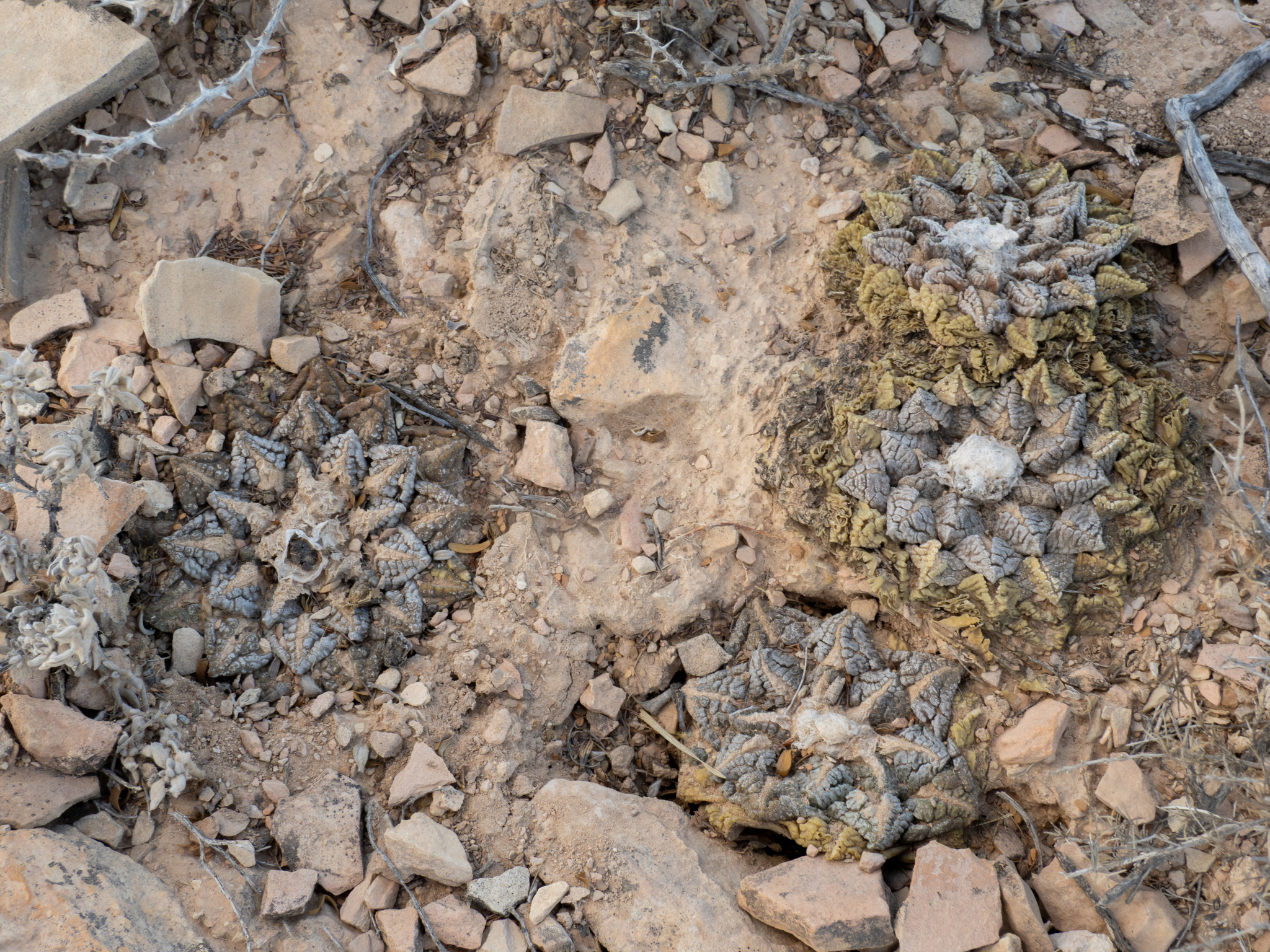
Habitat in Langtry, Texas

== Taxonomy ==
The first description as Mammillaria fissurata was by George Engelmann in 1856. Karl Moritz Schumann placed the species in the genus Ariocarpus in 1894. Further nomenclature synonyms are Anhalonium fissuratum (Engelm.) Engelm. (1856) and Roseocactus fissuratus (Engelm.) A. Berger (1925).

== Cultivation ==
In cultivation, Ariocarpus fissuratus is often grafted to a faster-growing columnar cactus to speed growth, as they would generally take at least a decade to reach maturity on their own. They require very little water and fertilizer, a good amount of light, and a loose sandy soil with good drainage.

== Poaching ==
Tens of thousands of wild specimens of this protected Texas cactus are annually removed illegally. Poaching has even extended to Big Bend National Park. Smugglers have taken entire populations of A. fissuratus, primarily for collectors, mainly in Europe and Asia. Loss of such a wide range of genetic variation weakens the species' chances of future survival. According to the U.S. Department of Justice, the cactus is protected by the Convention on International Trade in Endangered Species of Wild Fauna and Flora (CITES).

== Psychoactivity ==
Ariocarpus fissuratus is a unique species in that it has been used by Native American tribes as a mind-altering substance, usually only as a substitute for peyote. While it does not contain mescaline like species such as peyote, it has been found to contain other centrally active substances, such as N-methyltyramine, N-methyl-3,4-dimethoxyphenethylamine, and hordenine, albeit in doses too small to be active.
