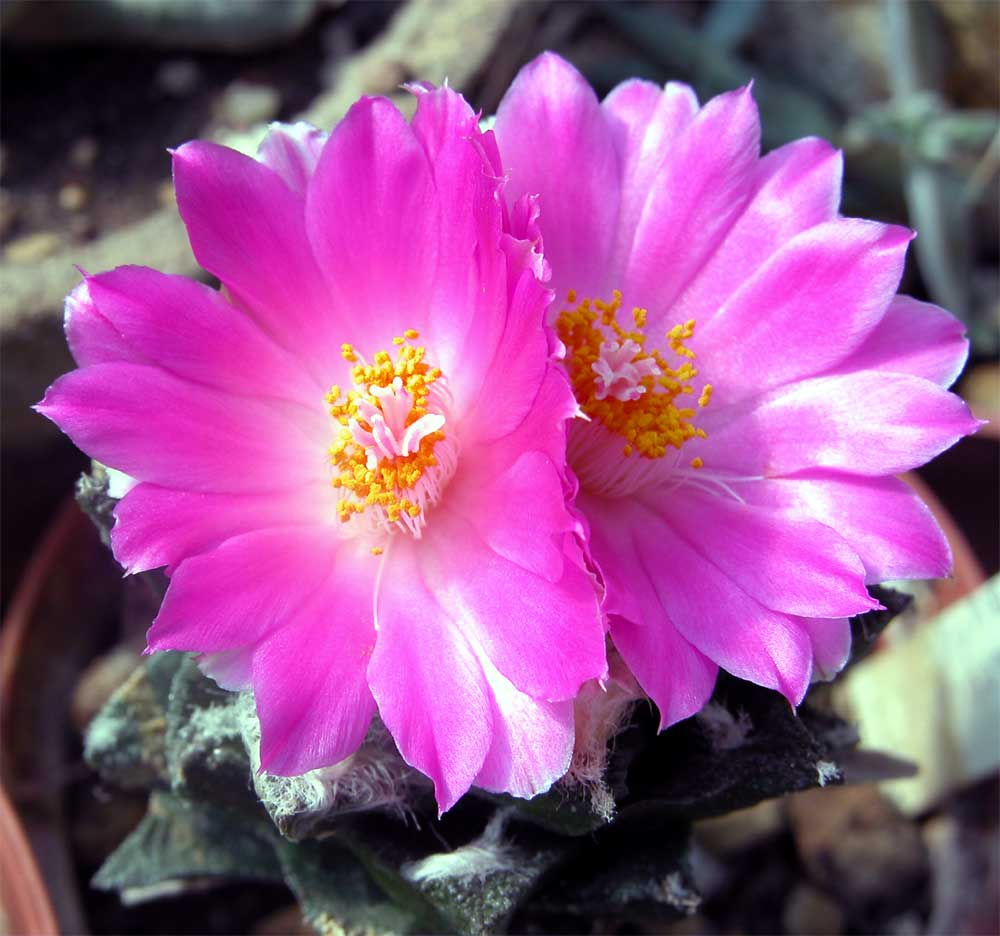

Conservation status
- Endangered (IUCN 3.1)
- CITES Appendix I

Scientific classification
- Kingdom: Plantae
- Clade: Tracheophytes
- Clade: Angiosperms
- Clade: Eudicots
- Order: Caryophyllales
- Family: Cactaceae
- Subfamily: Cactoideae
- Genus: Ariocarpus
- Species: A. bravoanus

Binomial name
- Ariocarpus bravoanus H.M.Hern. & E.F.Anderson

Synonyms
- Ariocarpus fissuratus subsp. bravoanus (H.M.Hern. & E.F.Anderson) Lüthy 1999; Ariocarpus kotschoubeyanus subsp. bravoanus (H.M.Hern. & E.F.Anderson) Halda 1998

= Ariocarpus bravoanus =

Species of cactus

Ariocarpus bravoanus is a species of cactus which is endemic to San Luis Potosí in Mexico. It grows in dry shrubland habitat on limestone substrates. It is endangered due to overcollecting.

== Description ==
Ariocarpus bravoanus is a fleshy plant grows geophytically with gray-green bodies that are 3 to 9 cm (1.2 to 3.5 in) in diameter and that barely protrude from the soil surface. The flattened, triangular and somewhat pointed warts protrude only slightly from the base of the shoot. The variable areoles sometimes have a woolly furrow along the entire length of the mastoid or are formed as a woolly cushion near the tip of the mastoid.

The magenta-colored flowers reach a diameter of 2.5 to 5 cm (0.98 to 1.97 in). The mostly light brown fruits are inconspicuous.

=== Subspecies ===
As of 2023, Plants of the World Online accepted two varieties:

| Image | Subspecies | Distribution |
|---|---|---|
| | Ariocarpus bravoanus subsp. bravoanus | Mexico (San Luis Potosí) |
| | Ariocarpus bravoanus subsp. hintonii (Stuppy & N.P.Taylor) E.F.Anderson & W.A.Fitz Maur. | Mexico (N. San Luis Potosí). |

== Distribution ==
Ariocarpus bravoanus is found growing on xerophytic shrubland on limestone gravel plains in the Mexican state of San Luis Potosí at elevations between 1500 and 2000 meters and is only known from a few localities. The habitat is fragmented.

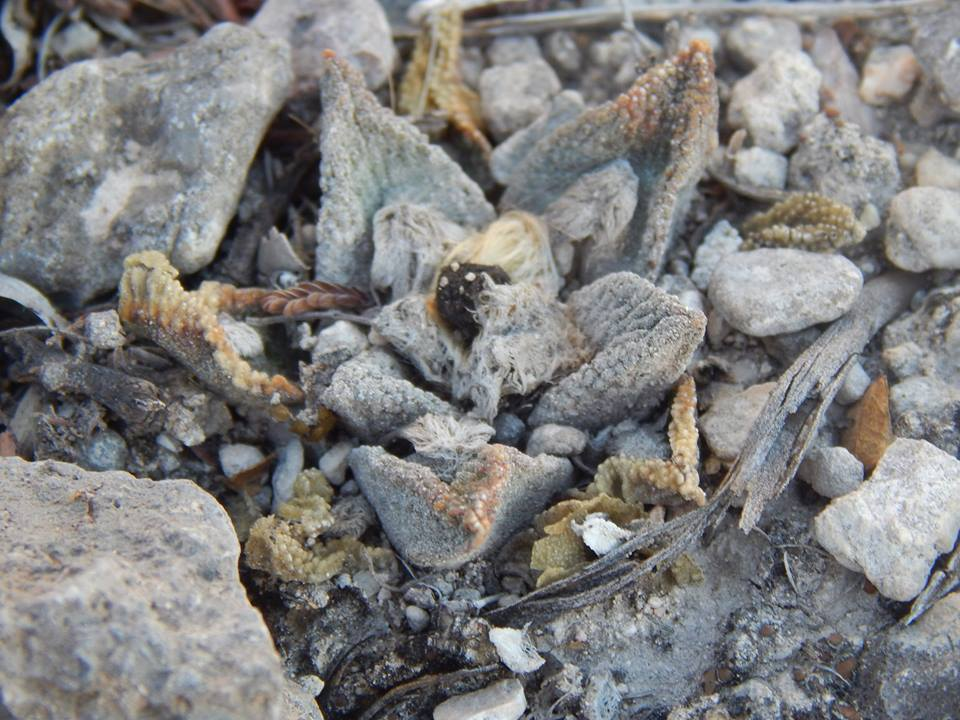
Plant of Ariocarpus bravoanus subsp. bravoanus growing in habitat near Núñez, San Luis Potosí

== Taxonomy ==
The first description was made in 1992 by Héctor Manuel Hernández and Edward Frederick Anderson. The plant was discovered while removing soil for the collection of another herbarium specimen. The specific epithet "bravoanus" honors the Mexican botanist and cactus collector Helia Bravo Hollis. Nomenclature synonyms are Ariocarpus kotschoubeyanus subsp. bravoanus (H.M.Hern. & E.F.Anderson) Halda (1998) and Ariocarpus fissuratus subsp. bravoanus (H.M.Hern. & E.F.Anderson) Lüthy (1999).
