= Kadenicarpus heliae =

Conservation status
- Endangered (IUCN 3.1)

Scientific classification
- Kingdom: Plantae
- Clade: Embryophytes
- Clade: Tracheophytes
- Clade: Spermatophytes
- Clade: Angiosperms
- Clade: Eudicots
- Order: Caryophyllales
- Family: Cactaceae
- Subfamily: Cactoideae
- Genus: Kadenicarpus
- Species: K. heliae

Binomial name
- Kadenicarpus heliae (García-Mor., Díaz-Salím & Gonz.-Bot.) D.Aquino

Synonyms
- Turbinicarpus heliae García-Mor., Díaz-Salím & Gonz.-Bot. 2015

Species of cactus

Kadenicarpus heliae is a species of plant in the family Cactaceae.

== Distribution ==
This species is found growing in limestone soils in Hidalgo, Mexico at elevations between 2200 and 2300 meters.
