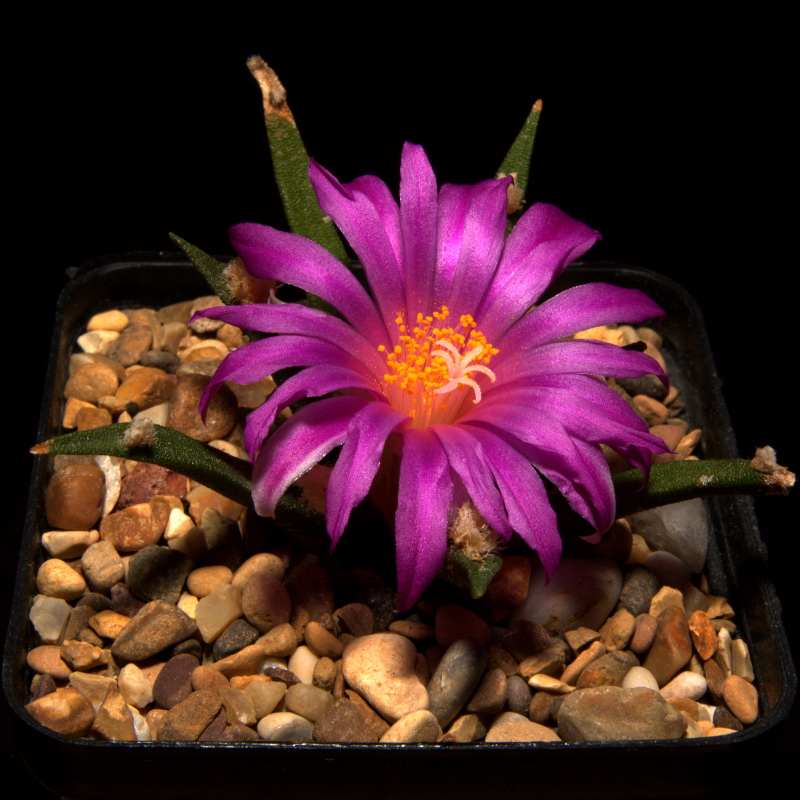

Conservation status
- Endangered (IUCN 3.1)
- CITES Appendix I

Scientific classification
- Kingdom: Plantae
- Clade: Tracheophytes
- Clade: Angiosperms
- Clade: Eudicots
- Order: Caryophyllales
- Family: Cactaceae
- Subfamily: Cactoideae
- Genus: Ariocarpus
- Species: A. agavoides

Binomial name
- Ariocarpus agavoides (Castañeda) E.F.Anderson

Synonyms
- Ariocarpus kotschoubeyanus subsp. agavioides (Castañeda) Halda 1998; Neogomesia agavioides Castañeda 1941; Ariocarpus agavioides subsp. pulcher Halda & Horáček 2003; Ariocarpus agavioides subsp. sanluisensis Sotom., Arred., Sánchez Barra & Mart. 2003

= Ariocarpus agavoides =

Species of cactus

Ariocarpus agavoides (known commonly as the Magueyito or Tamaulipas living rock cactus) is a species of cactus. Some taxonomists place it in a separate genus as Neogomesia agavoides. The locals use the slime from the roots of the plants as glue to repair pottery. The sweet-tasting warts are eaten and often added to salads

== Description ==
This cactus is a small rosette-shaped succulent plant with short, stiff, dark green tubercles which closely resemble the leaves of a small Aloe or Haworthia. The plant grows geophytically with dark green to brownish bodies that are almost completely hidden in the ground and have a diameter of 3 to 8 centimeters. The areoles are very curiously placed halfway out on the upper surface of these pseudo-leaves. The warts protruding from the base of the shoot are spreading, elongated, 2 to 4 centimeters long and 5 to 10 millimeters wide. The spines, which are up to 7 millimeters long, can be completely absent, only present on some or on all warts. The subglobose, flattened stem is greenish brown in color and up to 6 centimeters (2.25 inches) long by 8 centimeters in diameter. The rest of the plant is rootstock growing underground. The divergent, flaccid tubercles are flattened adaxially. The areoles at the tips of the tubercles are up to 1.2 centimeters long. Some individuals lack spines, while others have whitish spines up to a centimeter long.

Plants 5 to 8 years of age begin to grow magenta flowers with a diameter of 3.5 to 5 centimeters long. The pistils are a deep yellow and the stamens are white. The globose fruit is reddish to reddish purple and turn brown when ripe and up to 2.2 centimeters long.

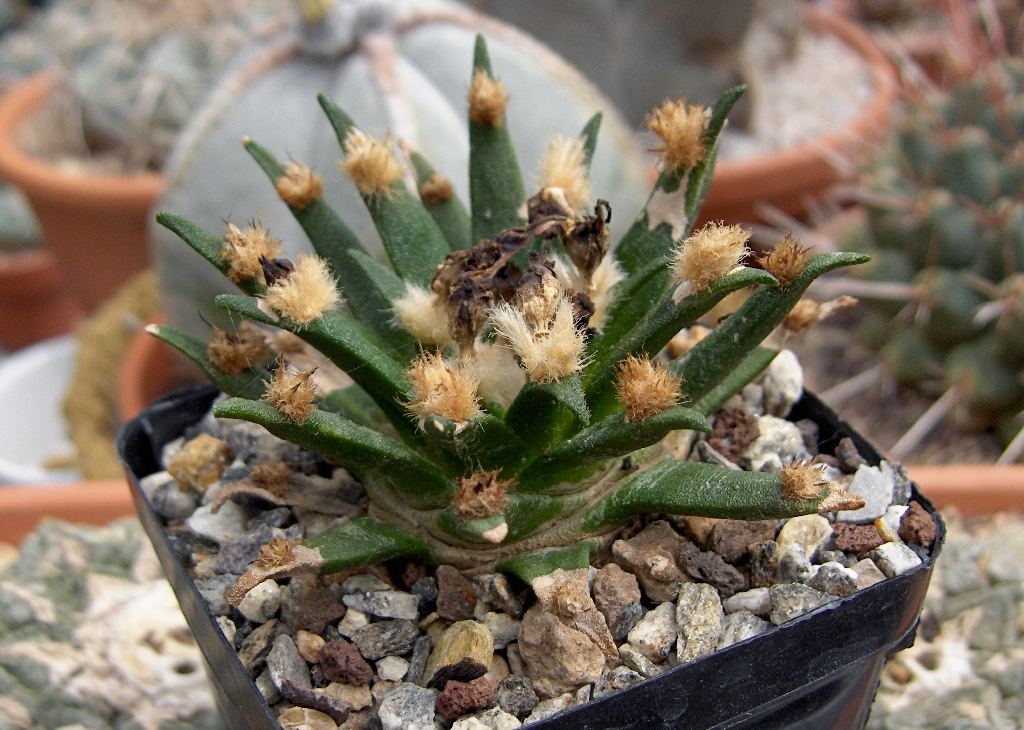
Plant

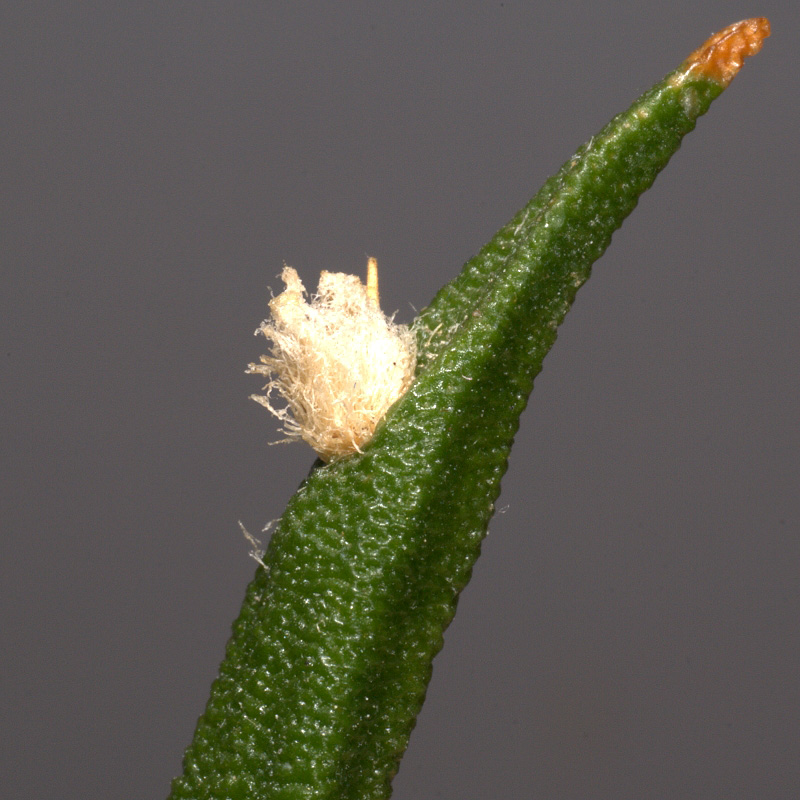
Spines

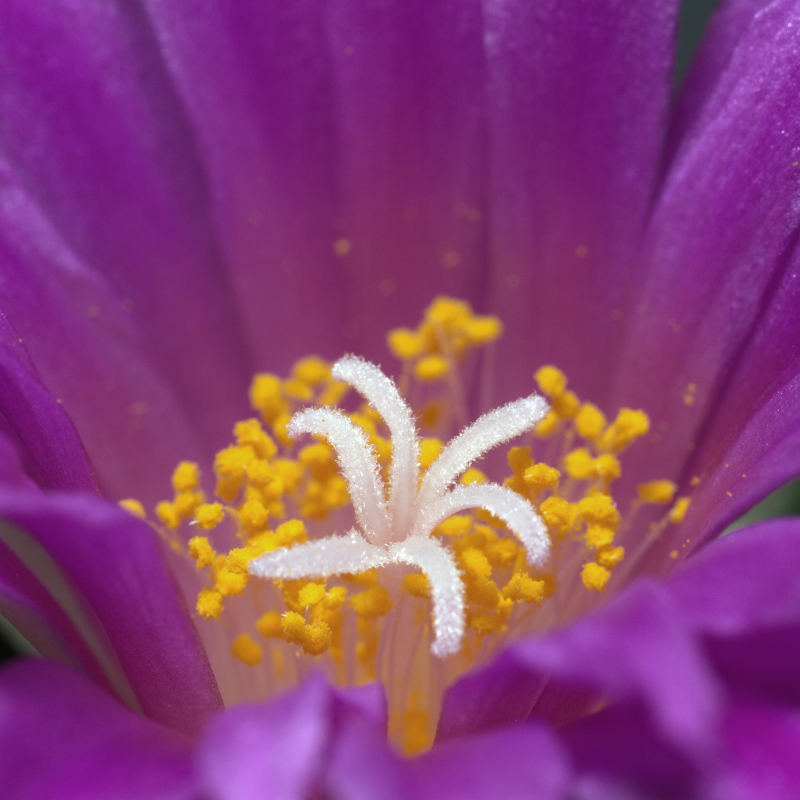

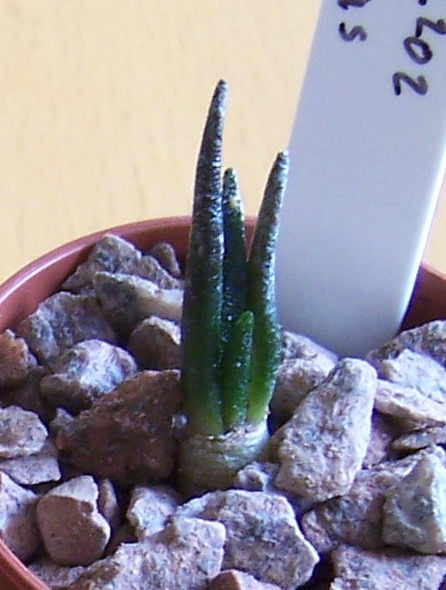
seedling

== Habitat and distribution ==
A. agavoides has a narrow distribution in the rocky limestone hills at about 1200 meters in elevation in Tamaulipas and San Luis Potosí in Mexico. It is endemic to Mexico. It grows in dry shrubland in rocky calcareous substrates.

== Taxonomy ==
The first description as Neogomesia agavoides was made in 1941 by Marcelino Castañeda, who created his new monotypic genus Neogomesia for the species. The specific epithet agavoides is derived from the Greek suffix -oides for 'resemble' and the genus Agave and refers to the appearance of the species. However, studies by Edward Frederick Anderson in 1962 showed that the species must be classified in the genus Ariocarpus.

== Conservation actions ==
This cactus is listed as an endangered species by the International Union for Conservation of Nature and it is listed on CITES Appendix I. It is illegal to collect the cactus in Mexico as it is protected by the state under the national list of species at risk of extinction, NOM-059-SEMARNAT-2010. Despite the restriction, it still shows up in the trade market.
