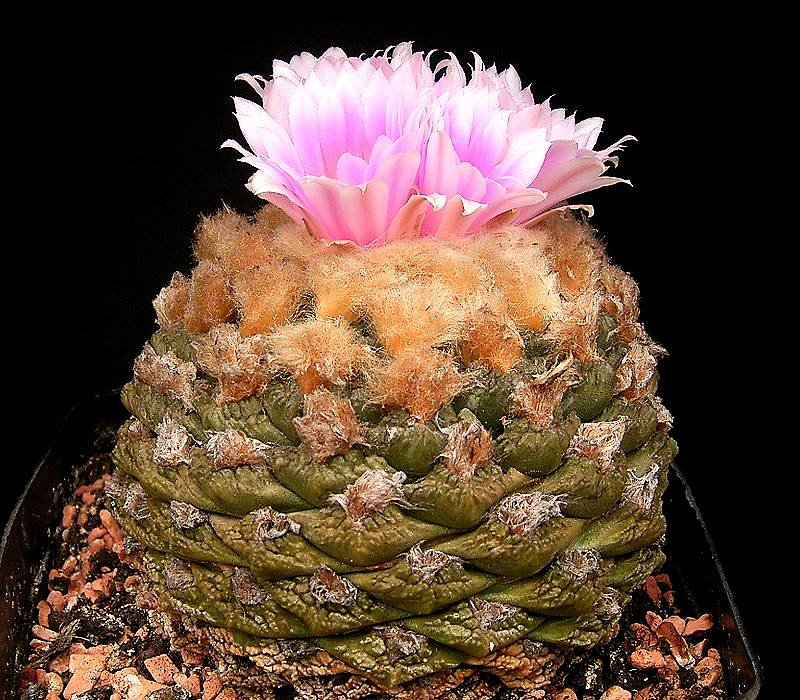
- Ariocarpus fissuratus

Scientific classification
- Kingdom: Plantae
- Clade: Embryophytes
- Clade: Tracheophytes
- Clade: Angiosperms
- Clade: Eudicots
- Order: Caryophyllales
- Family: Cactaceae
- Subfamily: Cactoideae
- Tribe: Cacteae
- Genus: Ariocarpus; Scheidw.

Species
- See text.

Synonyms
- Anhalonium Lem., nom. illeg.; Neogomesia Castañeda; Roseocactus A.Berger

= Ariocarpus =

Genus of cacti

Ariocarpus is a small genus of succulent, subtropical plants of the family Cactaceae.

It comes from limestone hills of Rio Grande in the south of Texas (Ariocarpus fissuratus) and also the north and the center of Mexico (all other species including A. fissuratus forms known as A. loydii and A. fissuratus var. intermedius) with strong sunshine exposures.

Ariocarpus are endangered and quite rare in the wild.

== Description ==
Ariocarpus species are very slow-growing. Plants have thick tuberous tap-roots, and are solitary or form small clusters of stems. The stems have tubercules (as is normal in cacti), but unusually these are triangular and in some species may resemble leaves. The areoles, when present, vary in appearance from grooves on the upper surface to round pads near the tips. Spines are only present in seedlings (except occasionally in Ariocarpus agavoides). The funnel-shaped flowers are borne on a woolly structure at the apex. They vary in colour, from white or yellow to pink, purple or magenta. The seeds are black and pear-shaped.

The plant contains bitter and toxic alkaloids such as hordenine. These protect the plant against consumption by herbivores.

== Taxonomy ==
The taxonomic history of the genus is somewhat confused. In 1838, Michael Scheidweiler described Ariocarpus retusus, establishing the genus. The name comes from the ancient Greek "aria" (an oak type) and "carpos" (= fruit) because of the resemblance of the fruit of the two genera to acorns. Another possibility for the origin of the name is the work Scheidweiler did on the tree Sorbus aria at the time he described the genus Ariocarpus. He might have meant the fruits of Ariocarpus plants look like the fruits of the Sorbus aria. He based the description on plants sent to Europe from Mexico by Henri Galeotti. The same plants were received by Charles Antoine Lemaire, who described them in a book published 1839 as Anhalonium prismaticum, adding a criticism of Scheidweiler's description in a note at the end of his book. Lemaire was well known as a cactus specialist, and subsequent authors used his name until about 1900, although Scheidweiler's name had priority. Anhalonium is superfluous and hence an illegitimate name.

In 1925, Alwin Berger separated off some species of Ariocarpus into the genus Roseocactus, on the basis of the shape of the areoles. This separation is not now considered justified. Ariocarpus agavoides was originally described in a separate genus, Neogomesia, but is now placed in Ariocarpus.

The species Lophophora williamsii (peyote) was placed in Anhalonium at one time, although not in Ariocarpus.

=== Species ===
As of July 2018, Plants of the World Online accepted the following species and natural hybrids:

| Image | Scientific name | Distribution |
|---|---|---|
| | Ariocarpus agavoides (Castañeda) E.S.Anderson | Mexico. |
| | Ariocarpus bravoanus H.M.Hern. & E.F.Anderson | San Luis Potosí in Mexico |
| | Ariocarpus fissuratus (Engelm.) K.Schum. | northern Mexico and Texas in the United States. |
| | Ariocarpus kotschoubeyanus (Lem.) K.Schum. | Coahuila and Nuevo León states, and southwards into Querétaro state, in northeastern Mexico. |
| | Ariocarpus retusus Scheidw. | Mexico |
| | Ariocarpus scaphirostris Boed. | Nuevo León state in northeastern Mexico. |
| | Ariocarpus trigonus (F.A.C.Weber) K.Schum. | Mexico (the states of Tamaulipas and Nuevo León) |

=== Natural Hybrids ===
- Ariocarpus × drabi Halda & Sladk. (=A. kotschoubeyanus × A. retusus)

== Distribution and habitat ==
With one exception, the genus is native to the central parts of Mexico, the northeast and the southwest. It is absent from the west, including Baja California, and from the southeast, including Yucatán. Ariocarpus fissuratus has a native range that extends from Mexico into south and southwest Texas in the United States, being found in the Chihuahuan Desert on both sides of the border.

Ariocarpus is strongly adapted to harsh dry conditions. Large underground roots make up much of the plant; the stem grows close to the soil (or even below it) and has a thick upper surface (epidermis).

== Cultivation ==
While very slow growing, a number of species, A. retusus for instance, are not particularly difficult to keep.

Ariocarpus species have a tuberous root system and are quite sensitive to soil conditions, preferring sharply draining loam based soils with minimal humus. Care should be taken to avoid overwatering, allowing the soil to dry out completely between waterings. Plants require water only during periods of summer growth and should be kept perfectly dry overwinter, with a minimum temperature of 12 °C, although certain species can cope with considerably cooler conditions.

Propagation is by seed and, although slow, is not necessarily difficult.

Ariocarpus seedlings are often grafted on Pereskiopsis in order to considerably increase their growth rate, more mature plants may be regrafted onto Echinopsis, Eriocereus or Opuntia compressa for better hardiness, though such plants often bear little resemblance to ungrafted specimens.

== Bibliography ==
- Innes C, Wall B (1995). Cacti Succulents and Bromaliads. Cassell & The Royal Horticultural Society.
