= Psychoactive cactus =

Cactus containing psychoactive chemicals

Many cacti are known to be psychoactive, containing phenethylamine alkaloids such as mescaline. However, the two main ritualistic (folkloric) genera are Echinopsis, of which the most psychoactive species occur in the San Pedro cactus group (including Echinopsis pachanoi, syn. Trichocereus pachanoi, Echinopsis peruviana, syn. Trichocereus peruvianus and Echinopsis lageniformis, syn. Trichocereus bridgesii), and Lophophora, with peyote (Lophophora williamsii) being the most psychoactive species. Several other species pertaining to other genera are also psychoactive, though not always used with a ritualistic intent.

== Species ==
=== Globular cacti ===
- Lophophora williamsii (peyote)

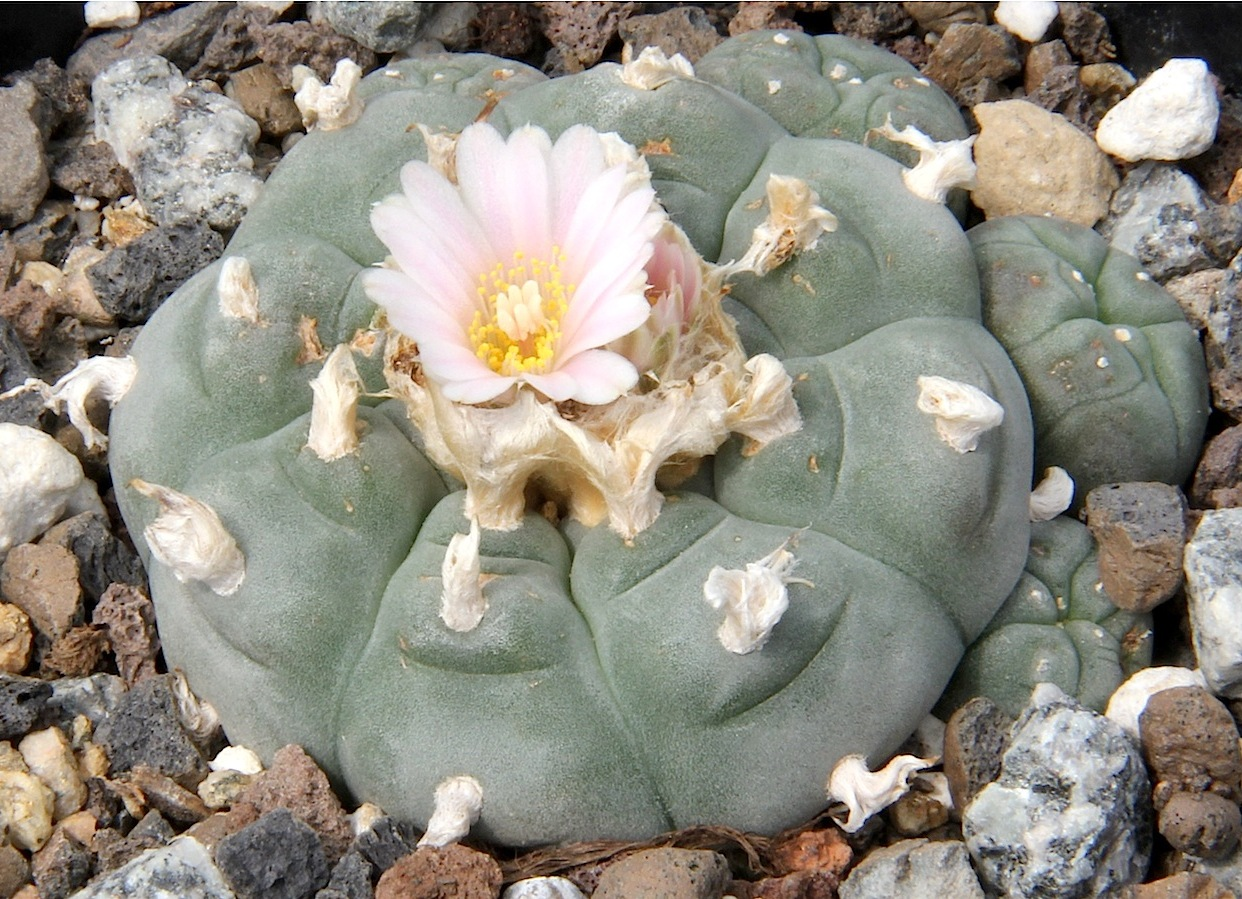
Peyote with flower

Other "peyotes"

- Ariocarpus fissuratus
- Coryphantha compacta (syn. C. palmeri)
- Pelecyphora aselliformis
- Pelecyphora strobiliformis
- Lophophora diffusa
- Ariocarpus retusus
- Ariocarpus agavoides; kotschoubeyanus; and other species
- Astrophytum asterias; capricorne; myriostigma; and other species
- Aztekium ritteri; and other species
- Coryphantha elephantidens; macromeris (var. runyonii); palmeri; and other species
- Echinocactus grandis; grusonii; platyacanthus; visnaga; and other species
- Epithelantha micromeris; and other species
- Leuchtenbergia principis'; and other species
- Lophophora species
- Mammillaria craigii; grahamii (var. oliviae); heyderi; (Dolichothele) longimamma; (Solisia) pectinifera; (Mamillopsis) senilis; sonorensis; and other species
- Obregonia denegrii
- Strombocactus disciformis
- Turbinicarpus laui; lophophoroides; jauernigii; (Pelecyphora) pseudopectinatus; schmiedickeanus; and other species

==== Other ====
Other North American psychoactive and/or medicinal cacti.

- Carnegiea gigantea
- Echinocereus salm-dyckianus (var. scheeri); triglochidiatus; and other species
- Pachycereus pecten-aboriginum and pringlei

=== Arborescent and columnar cacti ===
==== Echinopsis ====
- Echinopsis lageniformis (syn. Trichocereus bridgesii) (Bolivian torch cactus)
- Echinopsis macrogona (syn. Trichocereus macrogonus), > 0.01-0.05% Mescaline
- Echinopsis pasacana ssp. atacamensis
- Echinopsis pachanoi (syn. Trichocereus pachanoi) (San Pedro cactus)
- Echinopsis peruviana (syn. Trichocereus peruvianus) (Peruvian torch cactus)
- Echinopsis scopulicola (syn. Trichocereus scopulicolus), 0.82% mescaline by dry weight in the outer green layer.
- Echinopsis spachiana (syn. Trichocereus spachianus), Mescaline; Mescaline
- Echinopsis tacaquirensis subsp. taquimbalensis (syn. Trichocereus taquimbalensis), > 0.005-0.025% mescaline
- Echinopsis terscheckii (syn. Trichocereus terscheckii, Trichocereus werdemannianus) > 0.005-0.025% Mescaline; mescaline 0.01%-2.375%
- Echinopsis valida (syn. E. validus), 0.025% mescaline
- Echinopsis werdermannianus

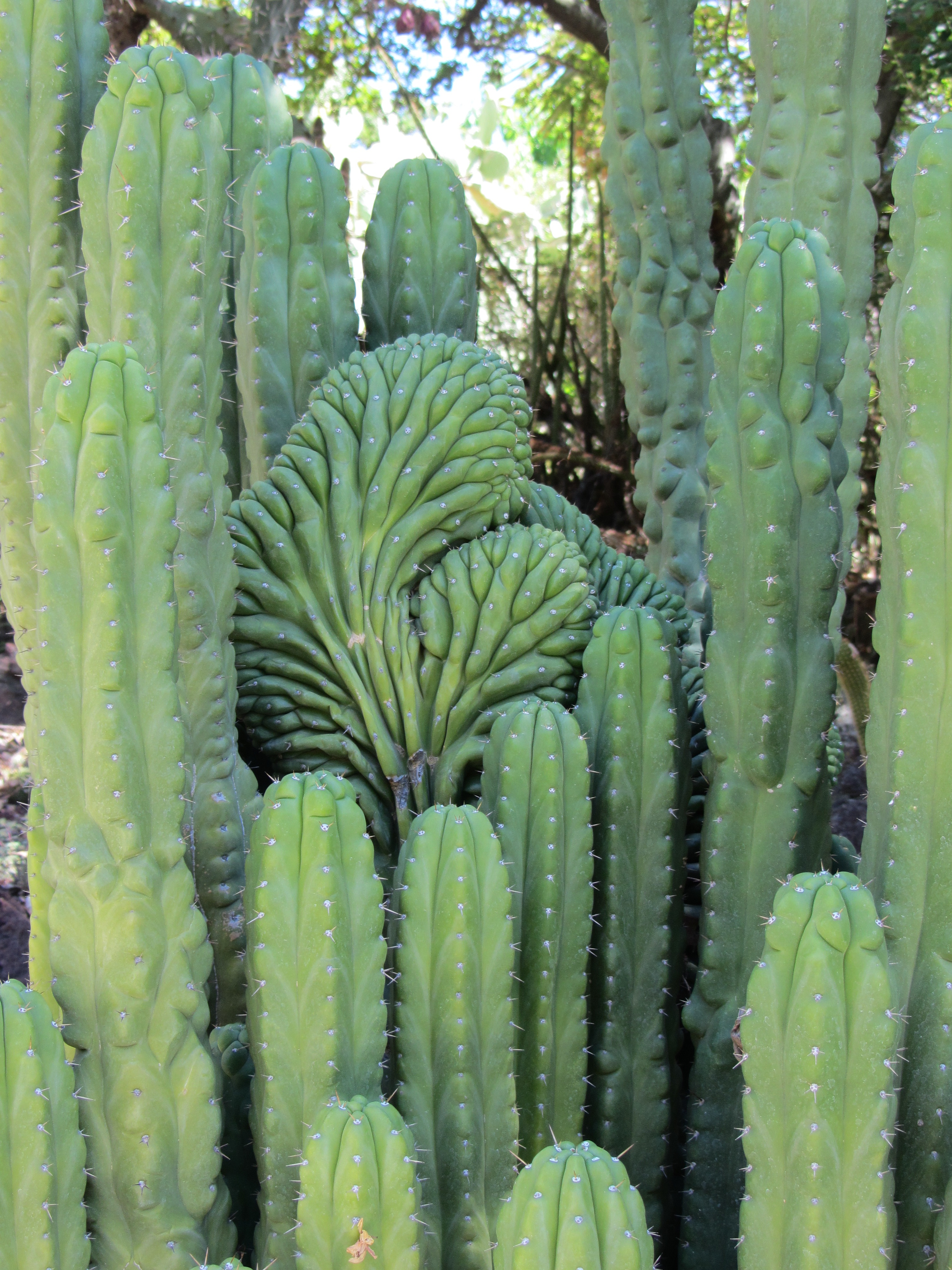
Echinopsis pachanoi

==== Other ====
Other South American psychoactive and/or medicinal cacti

- Austrocylindropuntia cylindrica (syn. Opuntia cylindrica), Mescaline
- Browningia spp.
- Cylindropuntia echinocarpa (syn. Opuntia echinocarpa), Mescaline 0.01%, DMPEA 0.01%, 4-hydroxy-3-5-dimethoxyphenethylamine 0.01%
- Cylindropuntia spinosior (syn. Opuntia spinosior), Mescaline 0.00004%, 3-methoxytyramine 0.001%, tyramine 0.002%, 3-4-dimethoxyphenethylamine.
- Epostoa lanata
- Matucana madisoniorum
- Neoraimondia arequipensis (syn. Neoraimondia macrostibas)
- Opuntia acanthocarpa Mescaline
- Opuntia basilaris Mescaline 0.01%, plus 4-hydroxy-3-5-dimethoxyphenethylamine
- Selenicereus grandiflorus
- Stetsonia coryne

== Traditional and Indigenous uses ==
Several world regions have historically used psychoactive cacti for their properties, particularly Indigenous peoples from North America and South America, such as in Mexico and the Andes region. Archaeological studies have found evidence of use going back two thousand years. In 2022, the Peruvian Ministry of Culture declared the traditional use of San Pedro cactus in northern Peru as cultural heritage. Lophophora williamsii (peyote) is used by the Native American Church (a.k.a. Peyotism or Peyote Religion).

== See also ==
- Cactus alkaloids
- Entheogenic drugs and the archaeological record
- List of Acacia species known to contain psychoactive alkaloids
- List of psychoactive plants
- List of psychoactive plants, fungi, and animals
- The Encyclopedia of Psychoactive Plants
