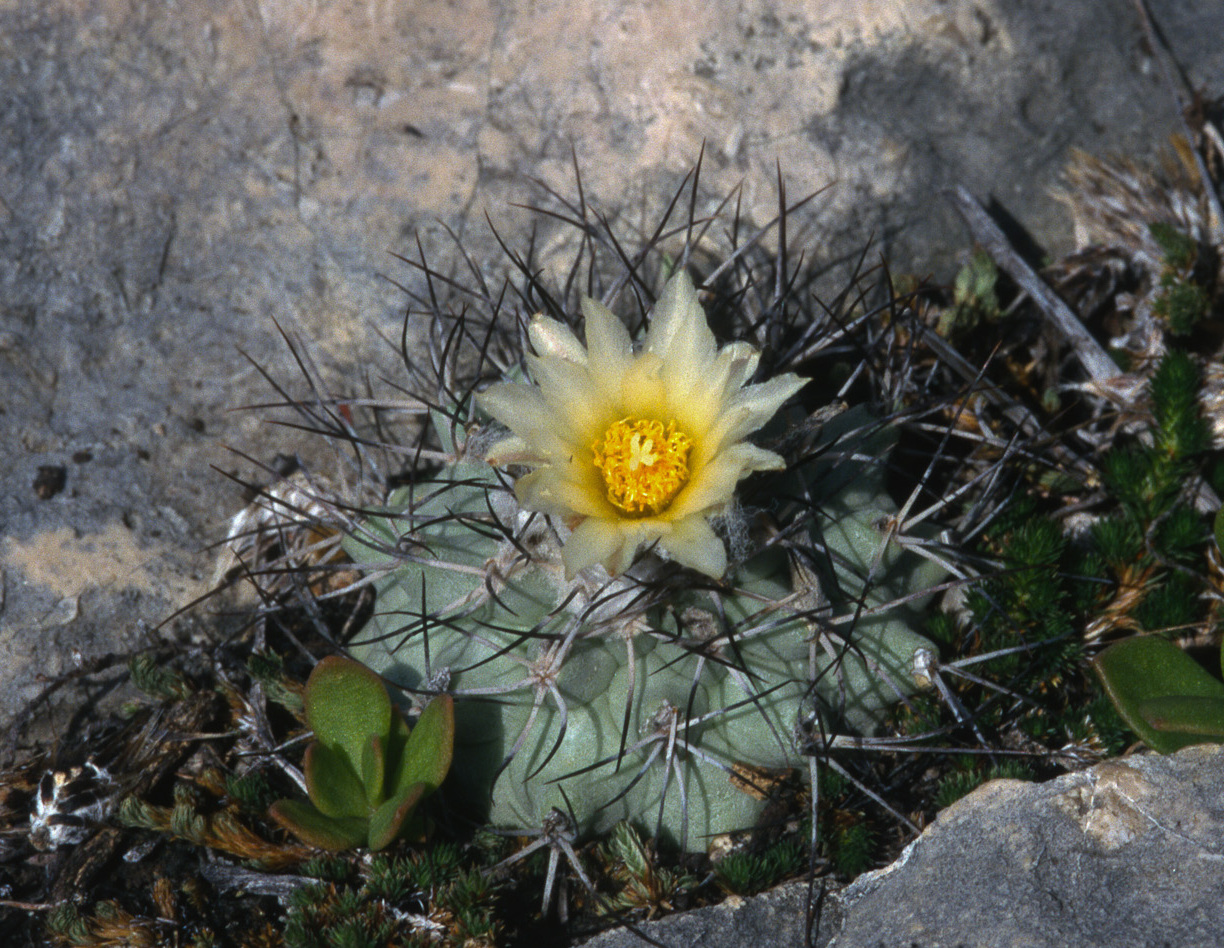

Conservation status
- Critically Endangered (IUCN 3.1)
- CITES Appendix I

Scientific classification
- Kingdom: Plantae
- Clade: Tracheophytes
- Clade: Angiosperms
- Clade: Eudicots
- Order: Caryophyllales
- Family: Cactaceae
- Subfamily: Cactoideae
- Genus: Turbinicarpus
- Species: T. gielsdorfianus

Binomial name
- Turbinicarpus gielsdorfianus (Werderm.) V.John & Říha

Synonyms
- Echinocactus gielsdorfianus Werderm. (1929) (basionym); Gymnocactus gielsdorfianus (Werderm.) Backeb.; Neolloydia gielsdorfiana (Werderm.) F.M.Knuth; Pediocactus gielsdorfianus (Werderm.) Halda; Thelocactus gielsdorfianus Werderm.) Borg; Turbinicarpus viereckii subsp. gielsdorfianus (Werderm.) Zachar

= Turbinicarpus gielsdorfianus =

Species of cactus

Turbinicarpus gielsdorfianus is a species of flowering plant in the family Cactaceae.

It is a succulent cactus subshrub endemic to northeastern Mexico. It was discovered near Ciudad del Maíz in San Luis Potosí state, in dry mattoral shrubland on a rocky calcareous slope. It is part of an edaphic plant community called matorral rosetófilo which grows on calcareous substrates.

It was thought to be extinct for some time until it was rediscovered. It is a Critically endangered species, threatened by habitat loss.

The species was first described as Echinocactus gielsdorfianus by Erich Werdermann in 1929. In 1983 Václav John and Jan Říha placed the species in genus Turbinicarpus as T. gielsdorfianus.
