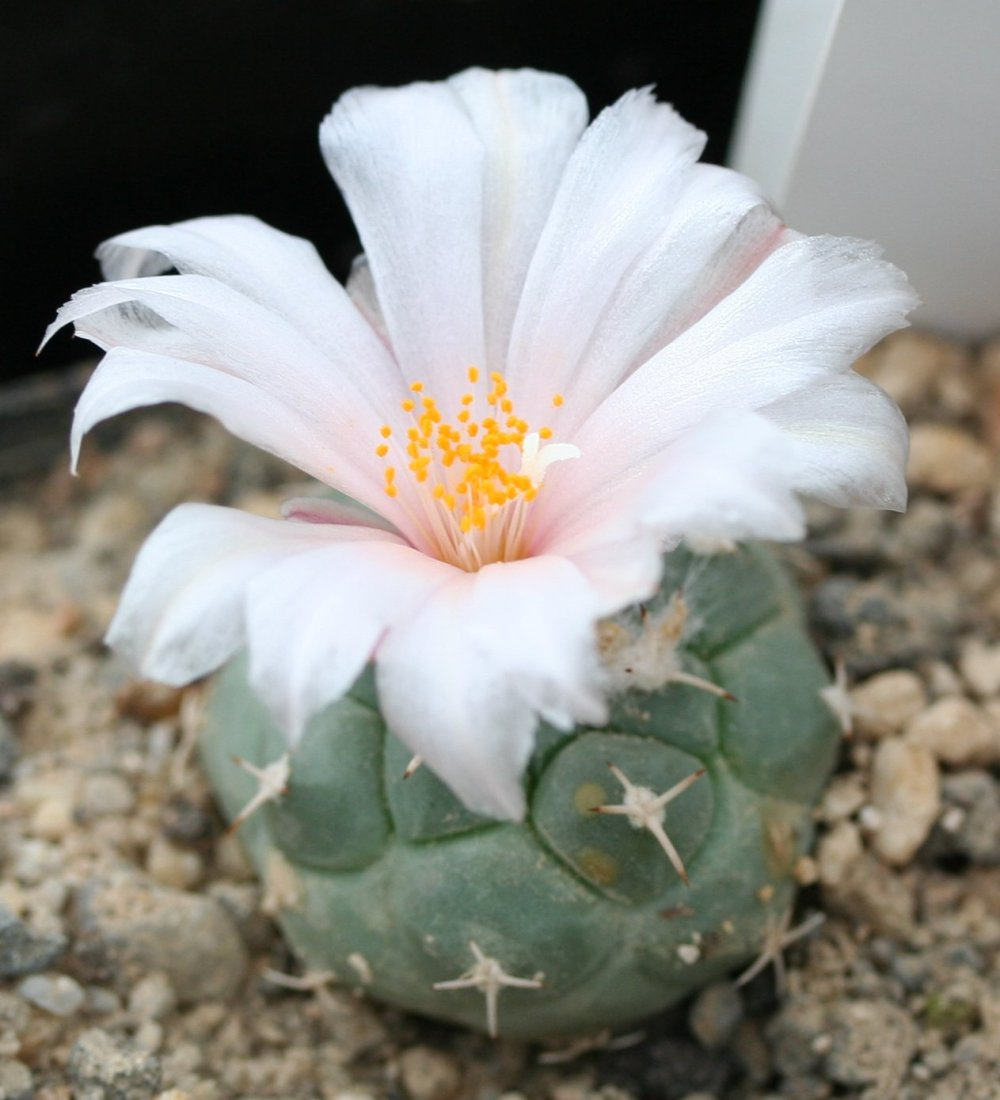

Conservation status
- Near Threatened (IUCN 3.1)
- CITES Appendix I

Scientific classification
- Kingdom: Plantae
- Clade: Tracheophytes
- Clade: Angiosperms
- Clade: Eudicots
- Order: Caryophyllales
- Family: Cactaceae
- Subfamily: Cactoideae
- Genus: Turbinicarpus
- Species: T. lophophoroides

Binomial name
- Turbinicarpus lophophoroides (Werderm.) Buxb. & Backeb.

Synonyms
- Neolloydia lophophoroides (Werderm.) E.F.Anderson; Pediocactus lophophoroides (Werderm.) Halda; Strombocactus lophophoroides (Werderm.) Backeb. (1935) (basionym); Thelocactus lophophoroides Werderm.; Toumeya lophophoroides (Werderm.) W.T.Marshall

= Turbinicarpus lophophoroides =

Species of cactus

Turbinicarpus lophophoroides is a species of plant in the family Cactaceae. It is a succulent cactus subshrub endemic to northeastern Mexico. Its natural habitats are subtropical or tropical dry lowland grassland and hot deserts. It is threatened by illegal collecting, habitat loss and insect parasitism.

The species was first described as Thelocactus lophophoroides by Erich Werdermann in 1934. In 1937 Franz Buxbaum and Curt Backeberg placed the species in genus Turbinicarpus as T. lophophoroides.

== Sources ==
- Smith, M.; Fitz Maurice, W.A.; Fitz Maurice, B.; Sotomayor, M. (2017). "Turbinicarpus lophophoroides". IUCN Red List of Threatened Species. 2017 e.T40981A121558149. doi:10.2305/IUCN.UK.2017-3.RLTS.T40981A121558149.en.
