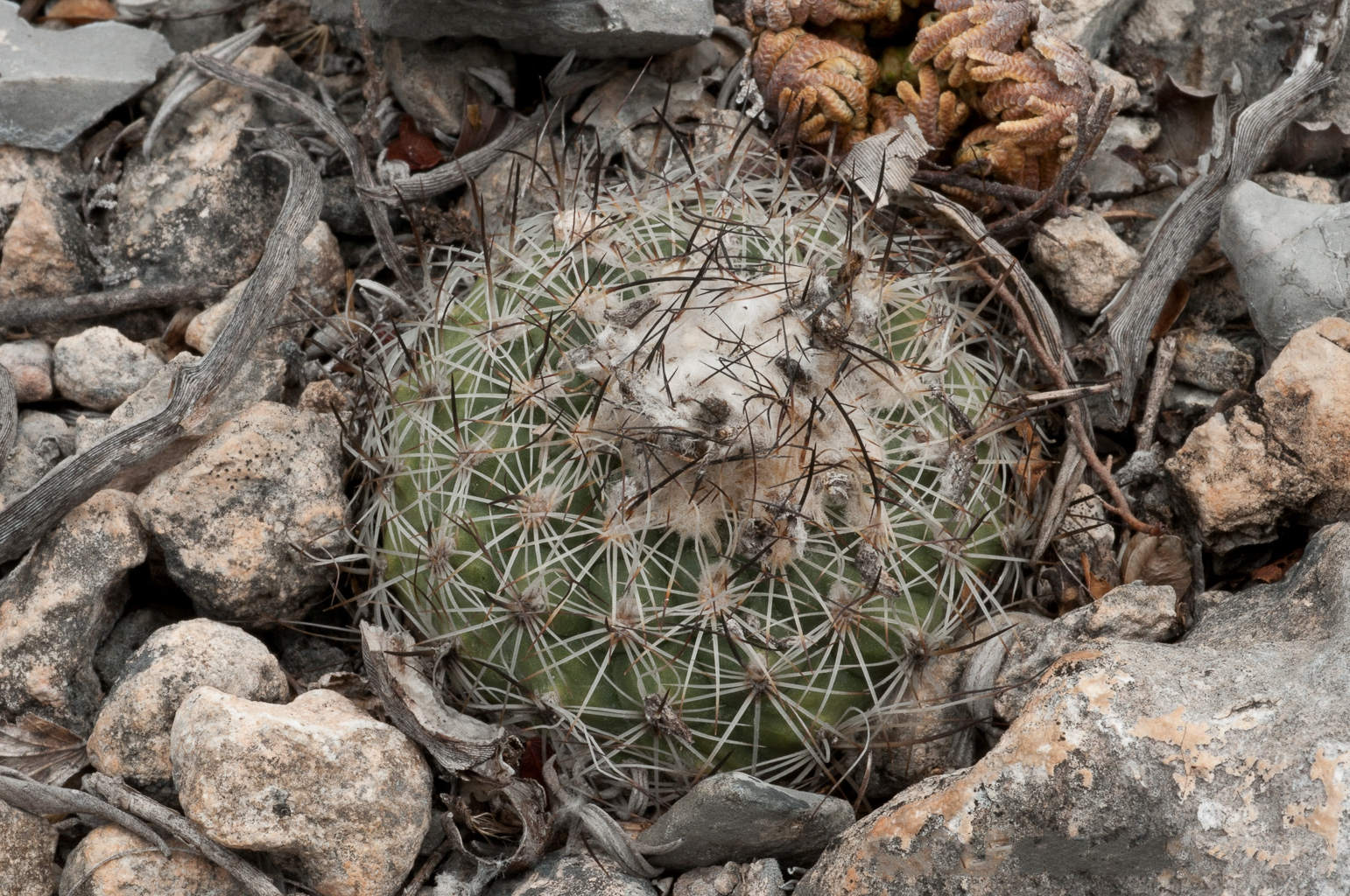

Conservation status
- Vulnerable (IUCN 3.1)
- CITES Appendix I

Scientific classification
- Kingdom: Plantae
- Clade: Tracheophytes
- Clade: Angiosperms
- Clade: Eudicots
- Order: Caryophyllales
- Family: Cactaceae
- Subfamily: Cactoideae
- Genus: Turbinicarpus
- Species: T. saueri

Binomial name
- Turbinicarpus saueri (Boed.) V.John & Říha

Subspecies
- See text.

Synonyms
- Echinocactus saueri Boed. (1928); Gymnocactus saueri (Boed.) Backeb.; Neolloydia saueri (Boed.) F.M.Knuth; Pediocactus saueri (Boed.) Halda; Thelocactus saueri (Boed.) Borg

= Turbinicarpus saueri =

Species of cactus

Turbinicarpus saueri is a species of plant in the family Cactaceae.

It is endemic to San Luis Potosí and Tamaulipas states, located in northeastern Mexico.

Its natural habitat is hot deserts.

== Subspecies ==
As of March 2026, Plants of the World Online accepts the following subspecies, some of which have been treated as separate species:

- Turbinicarpus saueri subsp. gonzalezii Pavlícek & Zatloukal
- Turbinicarpus saueri subsp. knuthianus (Boed.) Lüthy, syn. Turbinicarpus knuthianus (Boed.) V.John & Ríha
- Turbinicarpus saueri subsp. nelissae Halda & Panar., syn. Turbinicarpus ysabelae
- Turbinicarpus saueri subsp. nieblae (García-Mor., Mart.-Aval. & Bergm.Beck.) A.Hofer
- Turbinicarpus saueri subsp. saueri
- Turbinicarpus saueri subsp. septentrionalis Matusz. & Šnicer
- Turbinicarpus saueri subsp. verduzcoi Zachar & Lux
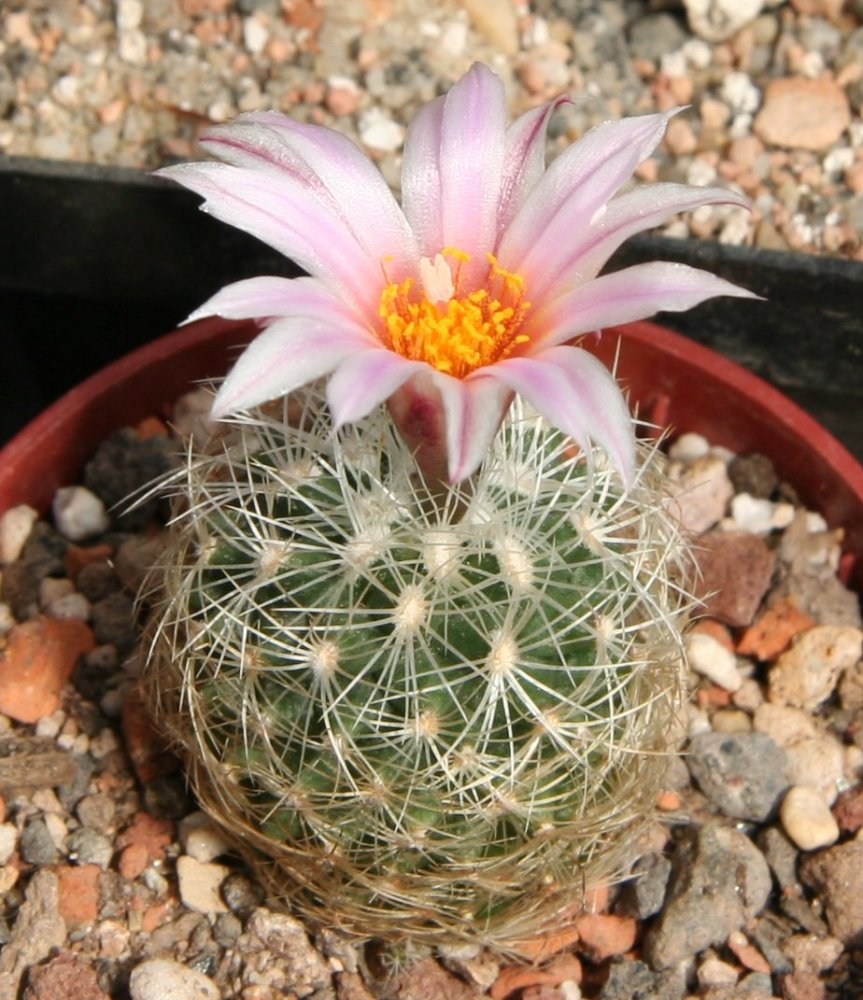
Turbinicarpus saueri subsp. knuthianus

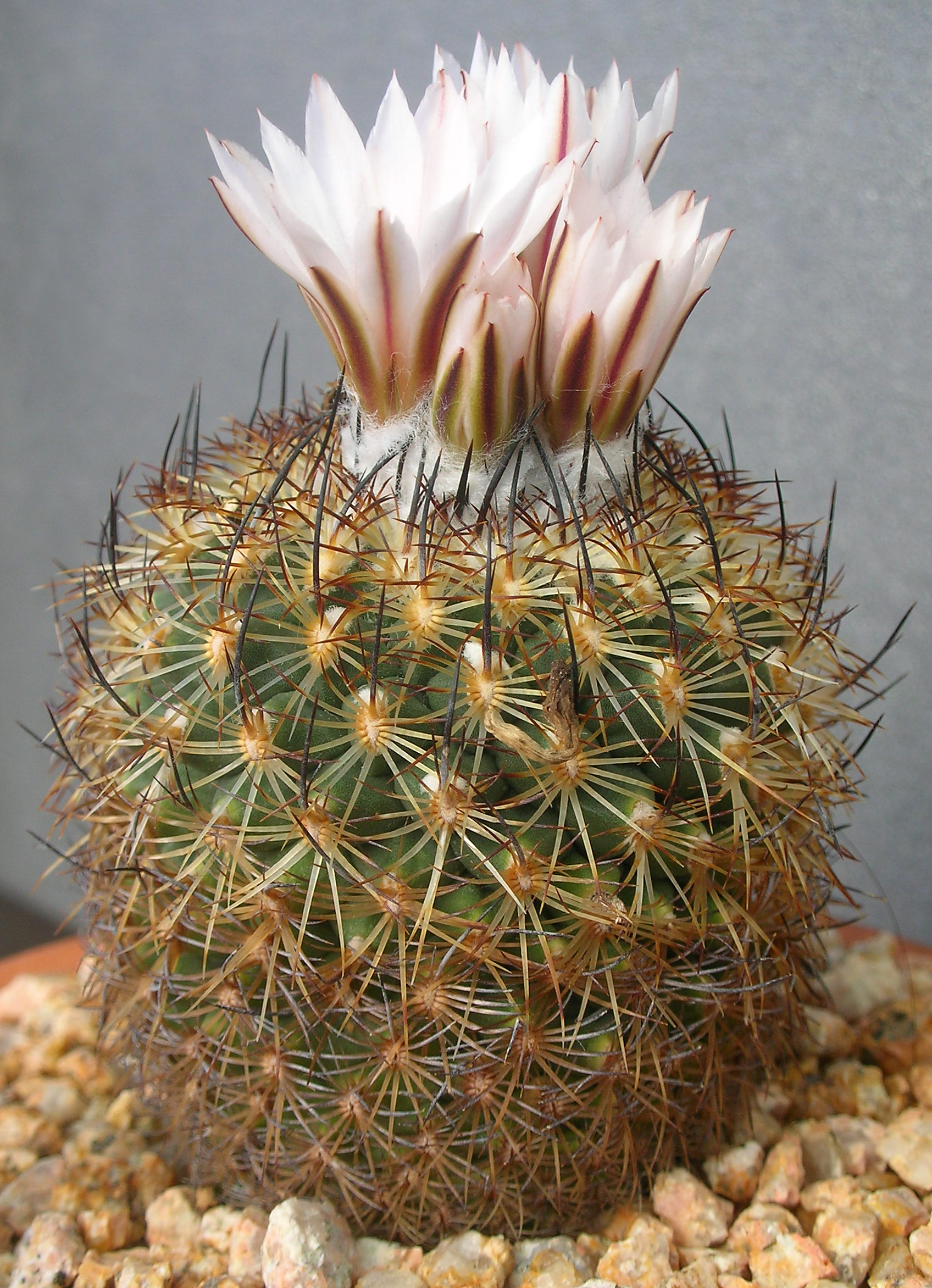
Turbinicarpus saueri subsp. nelissae

== Sources ==
- Sotomayor, M.; Smith, M. (2017). "Turbinicarpus saueri". IUCN Red List of Threatened Species. 2017 e.T151199A121562513. doi:10.2305/IUCN.UK.2017-3.RLTS.T151199A121562513.en.
