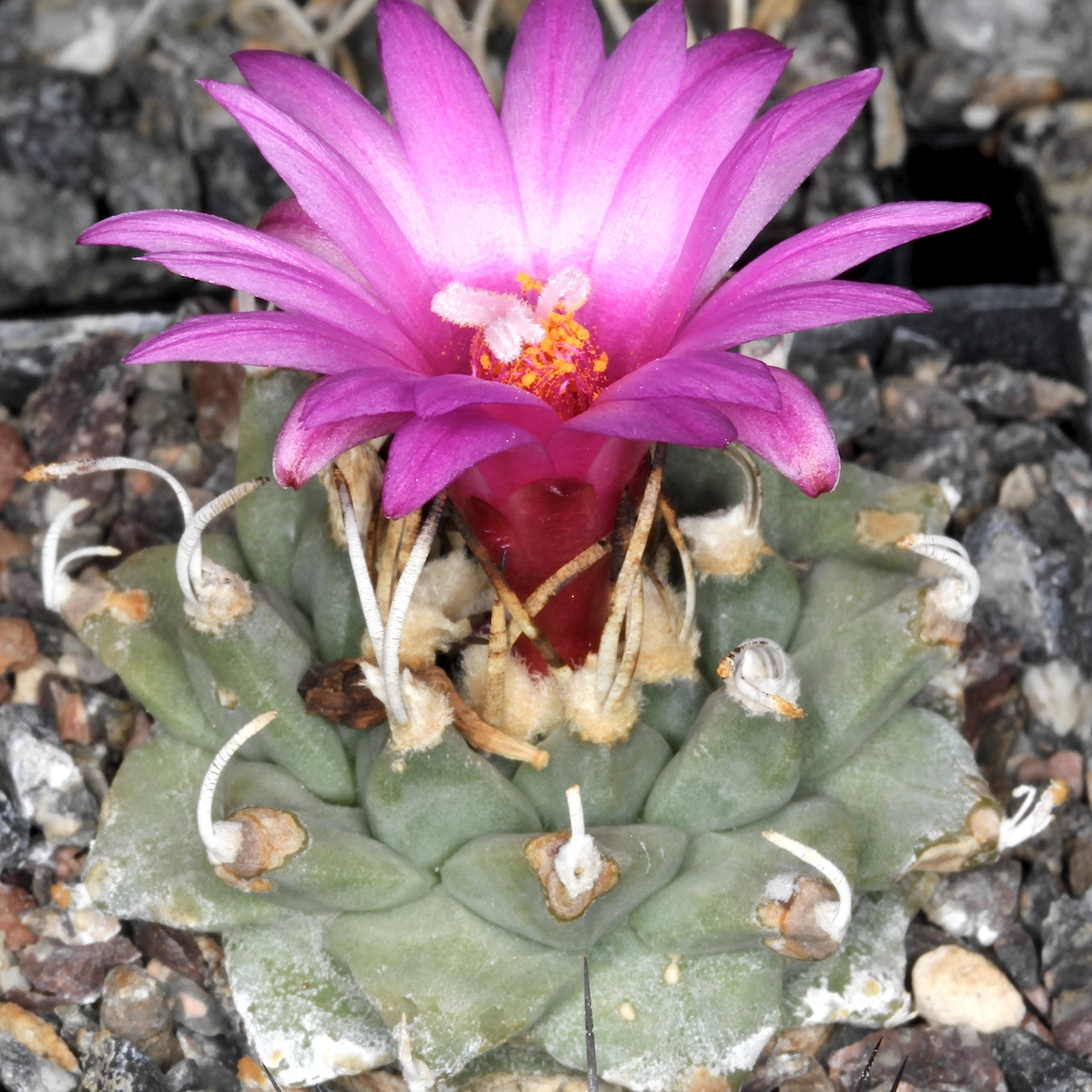

Conservation status
- Critically Endangered (IUCN 3.1)
- CITES Appendix I

Scientific classification
- Kingdom: Plantae
- Clade: Embryophytes
- Clade: Tracheophytes
- Clade: Spermatophytes
- Clade: Angiosperms
- Clade: Eudicots
- Order: Caryophyllales
- Family: Cactaceae
- Subfamily: Cactoideae
- Genus: Turbinicarpus
- Species: T. alonsoi

Binomial name
- Turbinicarpus alonsoi Glass & S.Arias

Synonyms
- Pediocactus alonsoi (Glass & S.Arias) Halda 1998

= Turbinicarpus alonsoi =

Species of cactus

Turbinicarpus alonsoi is a species of plant in the family Cactaceae. It is endemic to Mexico.

== Description ==
Turbinicarpus alonsoi grows singly with spherical bodies 6 to 9 centimeters in diameter and a poorly developed taproot. The flattened, triangular cusps are up to 1.5 centimeters long and 1.3 centimeters wide. The resulting 3 to 5 flattened, cardboard-like spines are gray with a darker tip. They grow up to 2 centimeters long.

The magenta flowers are 2.5 to 3.8 centimeters long and 2 to 3 centimeters in diameter. The reddish to dark purple fruits are 1 centimeter long and 0.5 centimeters in diameter.

== Distribution ==
Turbinicarpus alonsoi is widespread in the Mexican state of Guanajuato. Its natural habitat is hot deserts.

== Taxonomy ==
The first description by Charles Edward Glass (1934–1998) and Salvador Arias Montes was published in 1996. The specific epithet alonsoi honors Alonso Garcia Luna, who discovered the species. A nomenclature synonyms is Pediocactus alonsoi (Glass & S.Arias) Halda (1998).

== Cultivation ==
Turbinicarpus alonsoi is easily grown in cultivation, however due to its large taproot, it requires porous soil with plenty of inorganic material such as stones and dries as quickly as possible. Water infrequently and only when it is dry. Full sun to part shade is preferred, as it will encourage slow, compact and steady growth during spring and summer months. During its winter quiescent period, keep dry to prevent rot.
