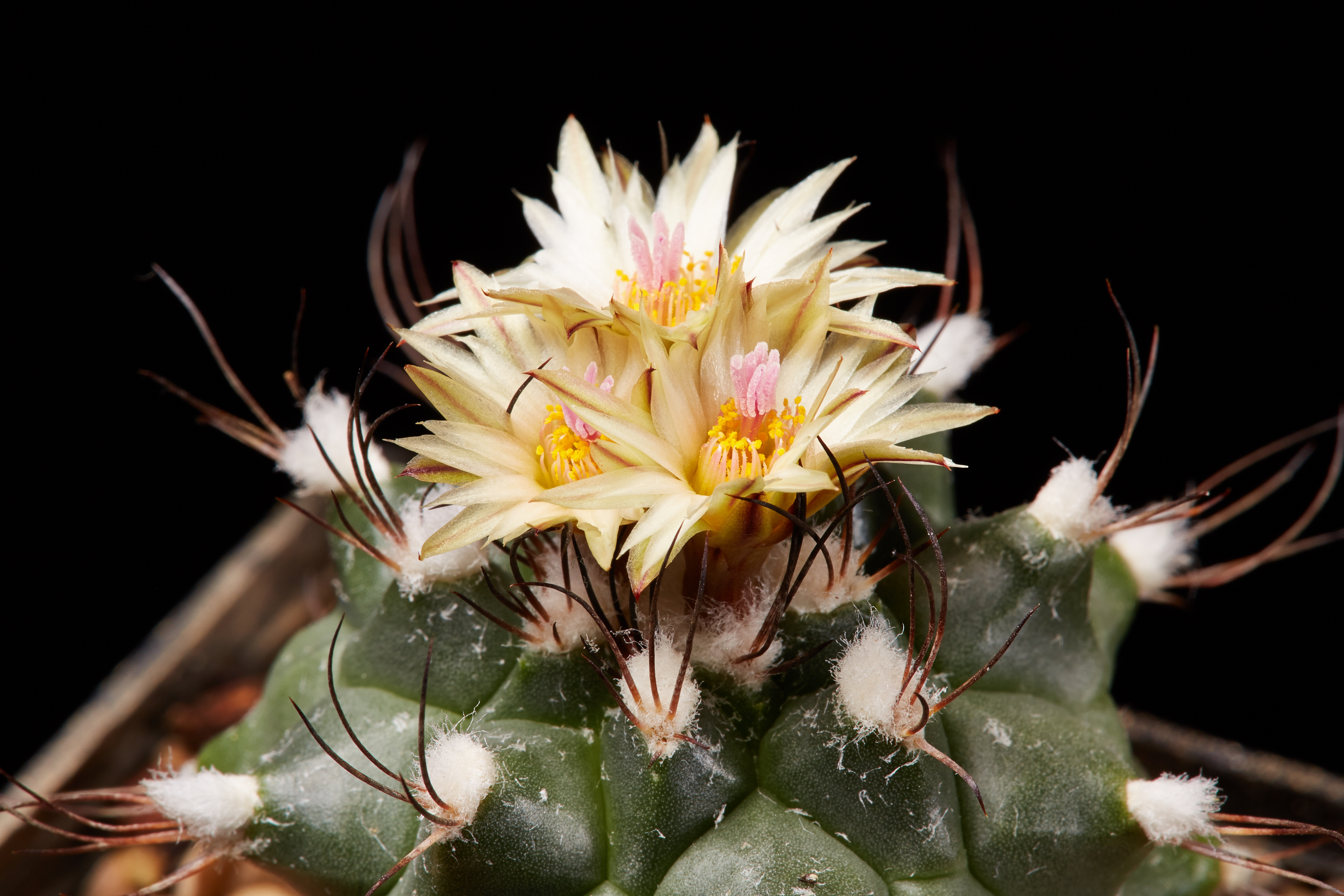

Conservation status
- Critically Endangered (IUCN 3.1)
- CITES Appendix I

Scientific classification
- Kingdom: Plantae
- Clade: Tracheophytes
- Clade: Angiosperms
- Clade: Eudicots
- Order: Caryophyllales
- Family: Cactaceae
- Subfamily: Cactoideae
- Genus: Turbinicarpus
- Species: T. swobodae

Binomial name
- Turbinicarpus swobodae Diers

= Turbinicarpus swobodae =

Species of cactus

Turbinicarpus swobodae is a species of plant in the family Cactaceae. It is endemic to Coahuila and Nuevo León in northeastern Mexico. Its natural habitat is hot deserts.
