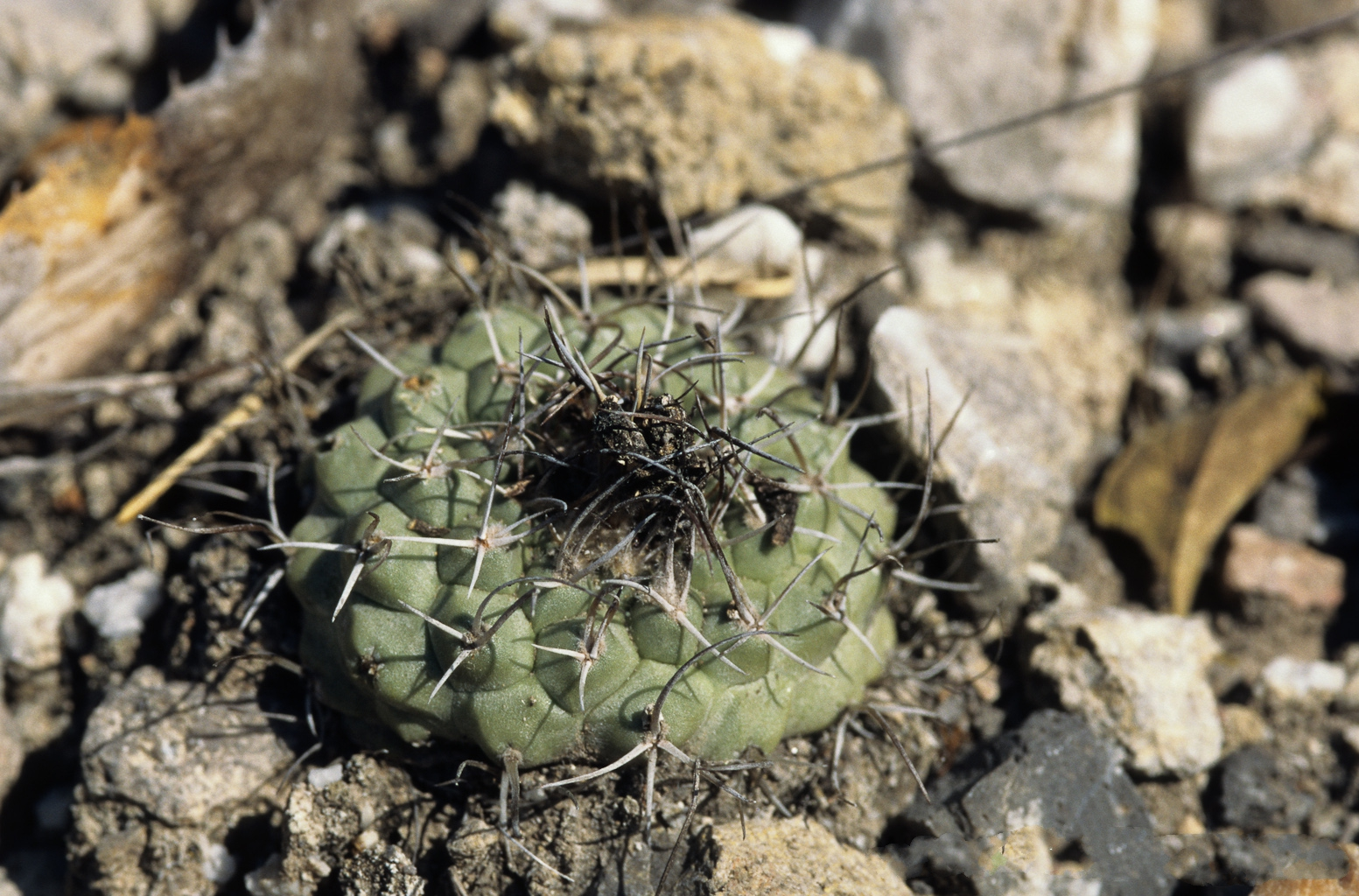

Conservation status
- Critically Endangered (IUCN 3.1)
- CITES Appendix I

Scientific classification
- Kingdom: Plantae
- Clade: Tracheophytes
- Clade: Angiosperms
- Clade: Eudicots
- Order: Caryophyllales
- Family: Cactaceae
- Subfamily: Cactoideae
- Genus: Turbinicarpus
- Species: T. hoferi

Binomial name
- Turbinicarpus hoferi Lüthy & A.B.Lau

Synonyms
- Pediocactus hoferi (Lüthy & A.B.Lau) Halda

= Turbinicarpus hoferi =

Species of plant

Turbinicarpus hoferi is a species of flowering plant in the family Cactaceae. It is a succulent cactus subshrub endemic to Nuevo León and Tamaulipas states in northeastern Mexico. It was discovered in dry matorral shrubland near Aramberri in Nuevo León at 1,800 meters elevation.
