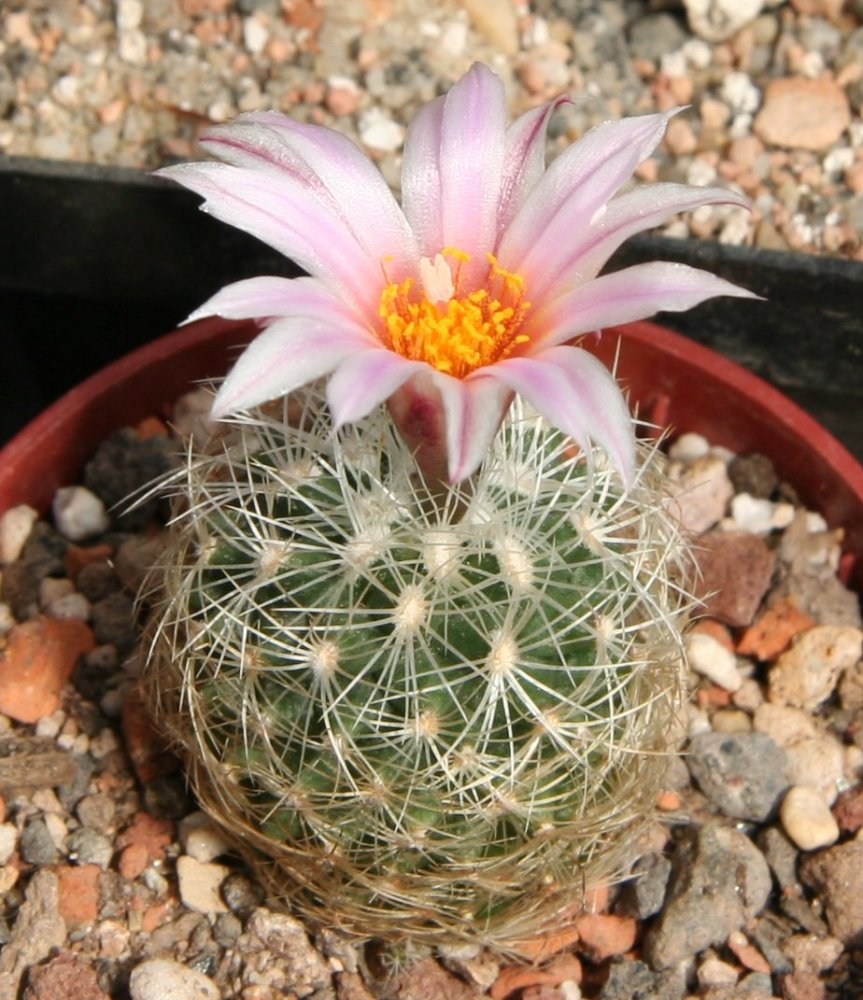
- Turbinicarpus saueri subsp. knuthianus

Scientific classification
- Kingdom: Plantae
- Clade: Tracheophytes
- Clade: Angiosperms
- Clade: Eudicots
- Order: Caryophyllales
- Family: Cactaceae
- Subfamily: Cactoideae
- Tribe: Cacteae
- Genus: Turbinicarpus (Backeb.) Buxb. & Backeb.

Type species
- Turbinicarpus schmiedickeanus

Species
- See text.

= Turbinicarpus =

Genus of cacti

Turbinicarpus is a genus of very small to medium-sized cacti, which inhabit the north-eastern regions of Mexico, in particular the states of San Luis Potosí, Guanajuato, Nuevo León, Querétaro, Hidalgo, Coahuila, Tamaulipas and Zacatecas.

== Taxonomy ==
The taxon was first proposed by Curt Backeberg as Strombocactus subgenus Turbinicarpus. It was elevated to a genus in 1937 by Franz Buxbaum and Backeberg. The circumscription of Turbinicarpus has been described as "remarkably unstable", with species regularly transferred to other genera. Its taxonomic history is often mixed with that of other genera like Echinocactus, Echinomastus, Gymnocactus, Mammillaria, Neolloydia, Normanbokea, Pediocactus, Pelecyphora, Strombocactus, Thelocactus and Toumeya, as the results of almost two centuries of constant evolution in the understanding of the affinities and relationships inside the family Cactaceae. A genus revision by Davide Donati in 2003, and again in 2004 with Carlo Zanovello, was based on a wide range of characters. At the end of that study, Rapicactus was considered a distinct genus from Turbinicarpus. The genus Turbinicarpus was subdivided in two subgenera at the light of the results of the DNA analysis, and into many series because of the ontogeny of the spination. The broad circumscription of Turbinicarpus was recognized as polyphyletic by Hunt in 2016. A phylogenetic study published in 2019 showed that both Kadenicarpus and Rapicactus were distinct from a more narrowly circumscribed and so monophyletic Turbinicarpus:

- - - - Three species of other genera
      - - Acharagma
        - Rapicactus
    - Species of other genera
  - - Epithelantha
    - - Strombocactus
      - - Kadenicarpus
        - - Ariocarpus
          - Turbinicarpus s.s.

== Species ==
As of March 2022, Plants of the World Online accepted the following species and hybrids:

Image	Scientific name	Distribution
	Turbinicarpus alonsoi Glass & S.Arias	Mexico.
	Turbinicarpus boedekerianus García-Mor., Gonz.-Bot., Matusz., Nitzschke & Iamonico	Mexico (Nuevo León)
	Turbinicarpus gielsdorfianus (Werderm.) V.John & Ríha	Mexico (San Luis Potosí)
	Turbinicarpus graminispinus Matusz., Myák & Jirue	Mexico (Nuevo León)
	Turbinicarpus heliae García-Mor., Díaz-Salím & Gonz.-Bot.	Mexico (Hidalgo)
	Turbinicarpus hoferi Lüthy & A.B.Lau	Mexico (Nuevo León)
	Turbinicarpus laui Glass & R.A.Foster	Mexico (San Luis Potosí)
	Turbinicarpus lophophoroides (Werderm.) Buxb. & Backeb.	Mexico (Ciudad del Maiz on the north, and Cerritos-Villa Juarez on the west and Rio Verde )
	Turbinicarpus nikolae nicer, Myák, Zachar & Jirue	Mexico Northeast
	Turbinicarpus pseudopectinatus (Backeb.) Glass & R.A.Foster	Mexico(Coahuila, Nuevo León, San Luis Potosí, and Tamaulipas )
	Turbinicarpus saueri (Boed.) V.John & Ríha	Mexico ( San Luis Potosí and Tamaulipas )
	Turbinicarpus schmiedickeanus (Boed.) Buxb. & Backeb.	Mexico(Nuevo León, San Luis Potosí, Tamaulipas )
	Turbinicarpus swobodae Diers	Mexico (Rayones, Nuevo León)
	Turbinicarpus valdezianus (H.Moeller) Glass & R.A.Foster	Mexico (Coahuila and San Luis Potosí)
	Turbinicarpus viereckii (Werderm.) V.John & Ríha	Mexico (Tamaulipas, Nuevo León and San Luis Potosí)

=== Natural hybrids ===
Image	Scientific name	Parentage	Distribution
	Turbinicarpus × mombergeri Ríha	Turbinicarpus pseudopectinatus × Turbinicarpus laui	Mexico (Cerritos, San Luis Potosí)
	Turbinicarpus × pulcherrimus Halda & Panar.	Turbinicarpus pseudopectinatus ssp. jarmilae × Turbinicarpus schmiedickeanus ssp klinkerianus	Mexico (Nuevo León)
	Turbinicarpus × roseiflorus Backeb.	Turbinicarpus viereckii × Turbinicarpus laui	Mexico Northeast

=== Synonymy ===
The following genera haven been brought into synonymy with Turbinicarpus:

- Gymnocactus Backeb.
- Normanbokea Kladiwa & Buxb.

== Ecology ==
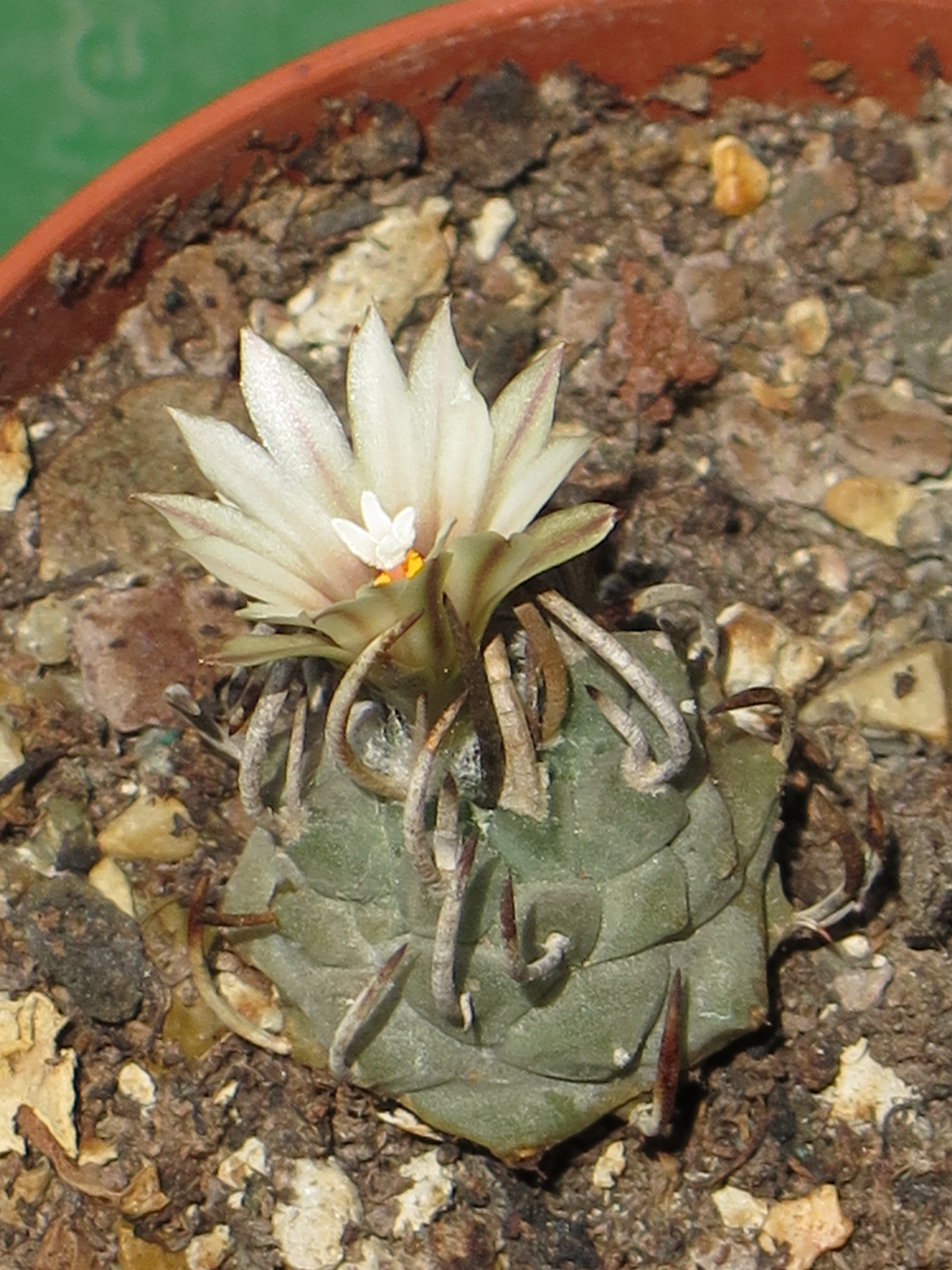
Turbinicarpus schmiedickeanus subsp. schwarzii

These succulent plants grow mostly on limestone soil (never on volcanic soil), at altitudes between 300 and 3300 metres above sea level.

Turbinicarpus species are usually confined to specific habitats, generally hostile for the majority of plants, mostly in very drained rocky areas, composed of limestone, sandstone, schist (neutral or alkaline), or in very acidic and humiferous understorey, or in gypsum veins, sometimes so pure that they are almost white.

In particular, Turbinicarpus sensu stricto is adapted to extreme niches: more than 80% of the species grow in rock cracks or among the pebbles beneath them, where enough dust has accumulated to enable root development. It would seem almost impossible that plants so small could survive in such an environment, however in those species that inhabit dry and exposed areas, the root is very thick, becoming a taproot and acting like an anchor on the slopes but, more important, as water storage for the dry periods, capable of significantly retracting into the ground so that the stem is less exposed to the sun; the spines are often changed to adopt a very papery structure, capable of absorbing good quantities of water. Furthermore, the general look is extremely mimetic, thanks to the epidermis colour and the interlacing spines, guaranteeing a certain protection from eventual herbivores.
