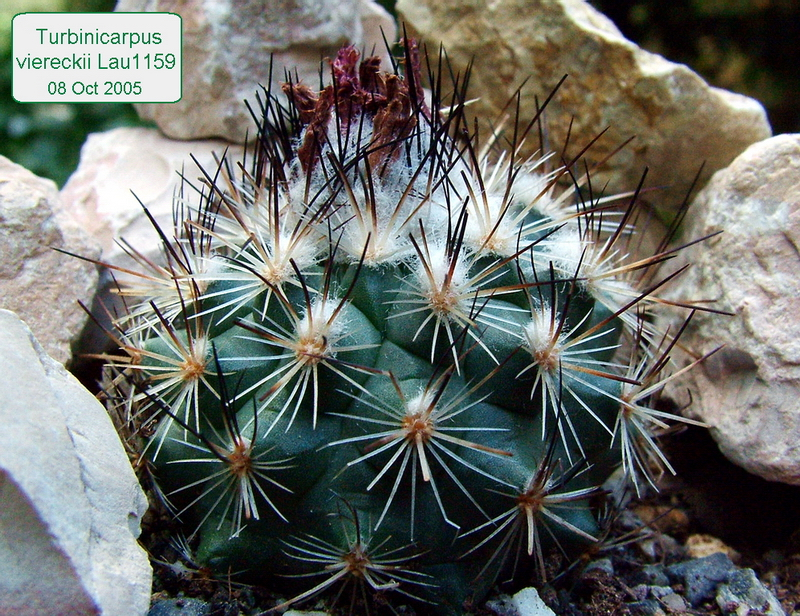

Conservation status
- Least Concern (IUCN 3.1)
- CITES Appendix I (CITES)

Scientific classification
- Kingdom: Plantae
- Clade: Tracheophytes
- Clade: Angiosperms
- Clade: Eudicots
- Order: Caryophyllales
- Family: Cactaceae
- Subfamily: Cactoideae
- Genus: Turbinicarpus
- Species: T. viereckii

Binomial name
- Turbinicarpus viereckii (Werderm.) John & Riha

= Turbinicarpus viereckii =

Species of cactus

Turbinicarpus viereckii is a species of plant in the family Cactaceae.

It is endemic to Tamaulipas, Nuevo León and San Luis Potosí states in northeastern Mexico.

Its natural habitat is hot deserts.

== Sources ==
- Fitz Maurice, W.A.; Fitz Maurice, B (2017). "Turbinicarpus viereckii". IUCN Red List of Threatened Species. 2017 e.T41001A121558843. doi:10.2305/IUCN.UK.2017-3.RLTS.T41001A121558843.en.
