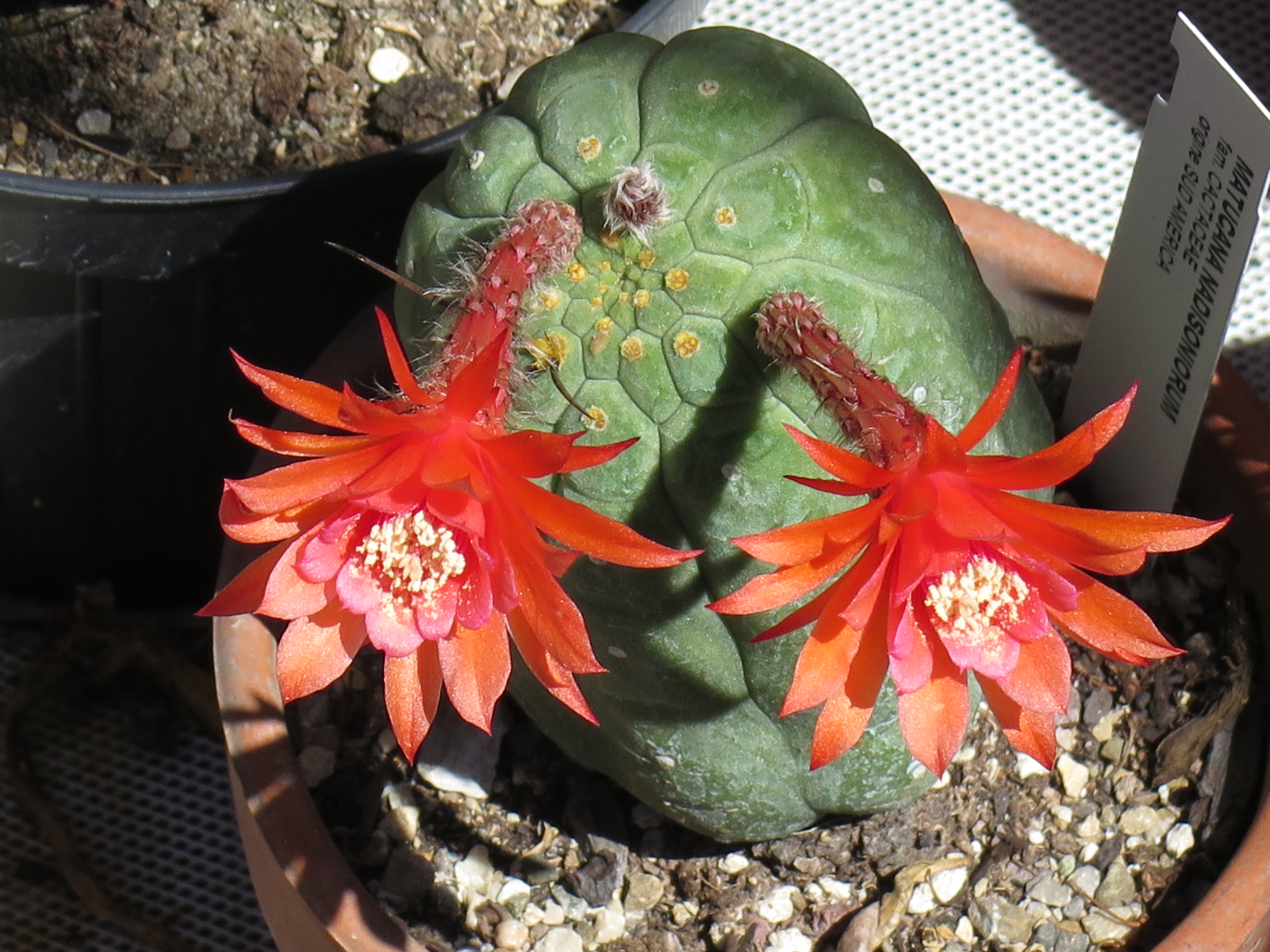

Conservation status
- Critically Endangered (IUCN 2.3)

Scientific classification
- Kingdom: Plantae
- Clade: Tracheophytes
- Clade: Angiosperms
- Clade: Eudicots
- Order: Caryophyllales
- Family: Cactaceae
- Subfamily: Cactoideae
- Genus: Matucana
- Species: M. madisoniorum

Binomial name
- Matucana madisoniorum (Hutchison) G.D.Rowley 2006

Synonyms
- Anhaloniopsis madisoniorum (Hutchison) Mottram 2014; Borzicactus madisoniorum Hutchison 1963; Eomatucana madisoniorum (Hutchison) F.Ritter 1981; Loxanthocereus madisonorum (Hutchison) Buxb. 1974; Submatucana madisoniorum (Hutchison) Backeb. 1966

= Matucana madisoniorum =

Species of cactus

Matucana madisoniorum is a species of Matucana found in Peru.

== Description ==
Matucana madisoniorum usually grows solitarily and only rarely sprouts with flattened, spherical to broadly columnar, cloudy grey-green shoots and reaches a height of up to 15 cm (5.9 in) with a diameter of 10 cm (3.9 in). There are seven to twelve flat and broad transversely furrowed ribs. They have up to five blackish-brown, curved, flexible and slightly falling spines, which can also be absent, turn gray with age, up to 3 cm (1.2 in) long.

The narrow, funnel-shaped, slightly crooked, orange-red flowers are 8 to 10 cm (3.1 to 3.9 in) long and have a diameter of 4 to 5.5 cm (1.6 to 2.2 in). The spherical, hairy fruits reach a diameter of up to 2 cm (0.79 in).

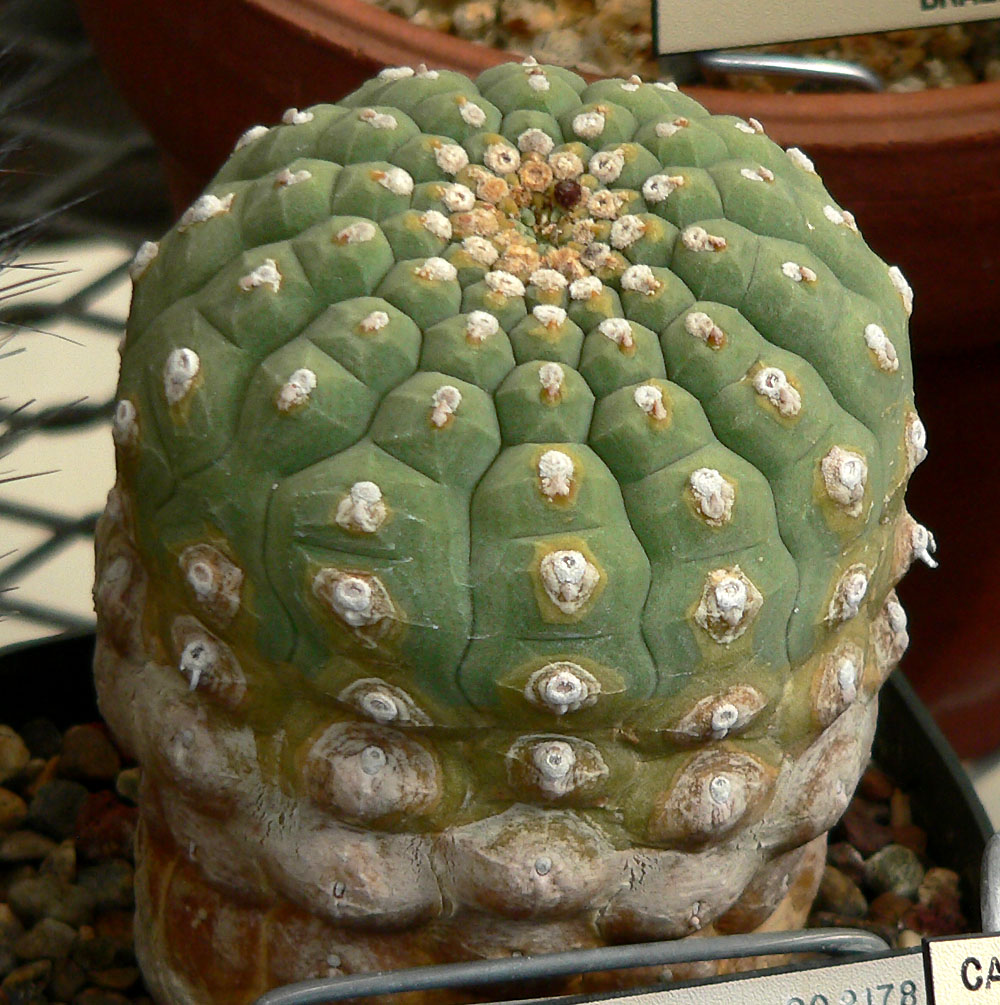
Adult plant

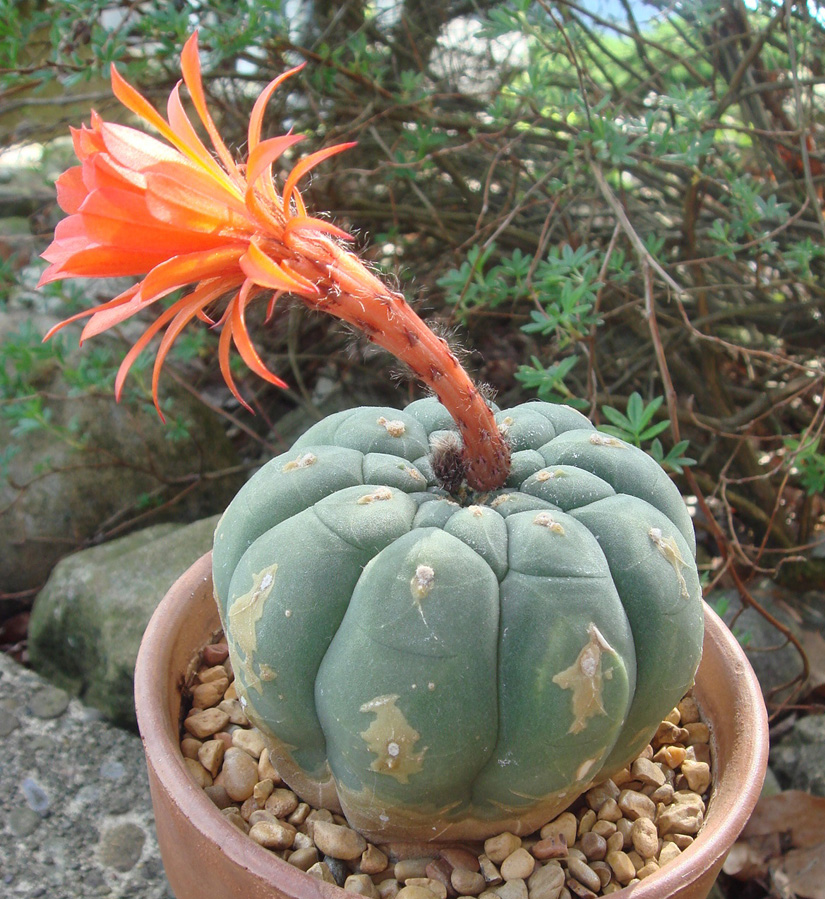
Blooming size plant

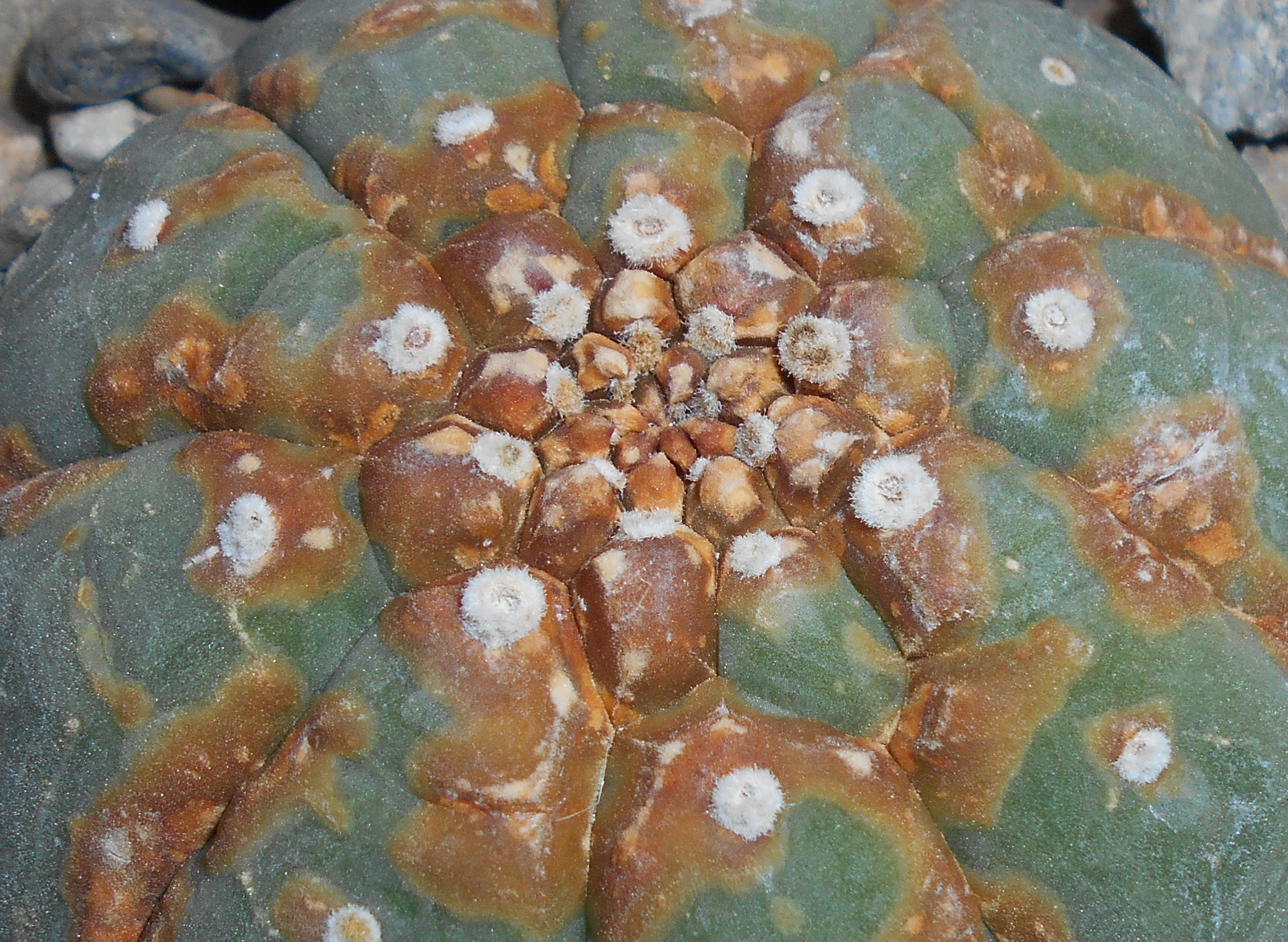
crown closeup

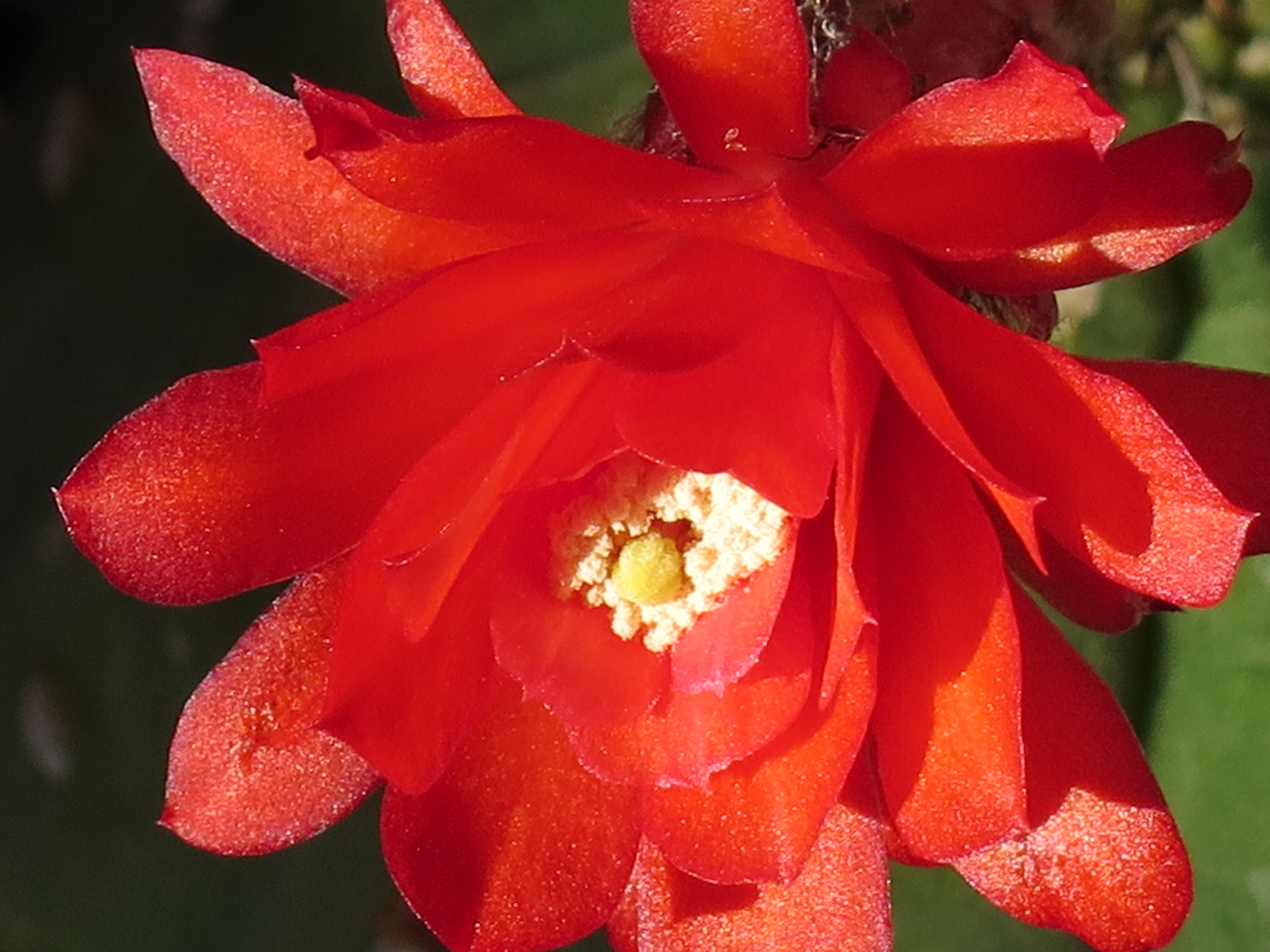
Flower closeup

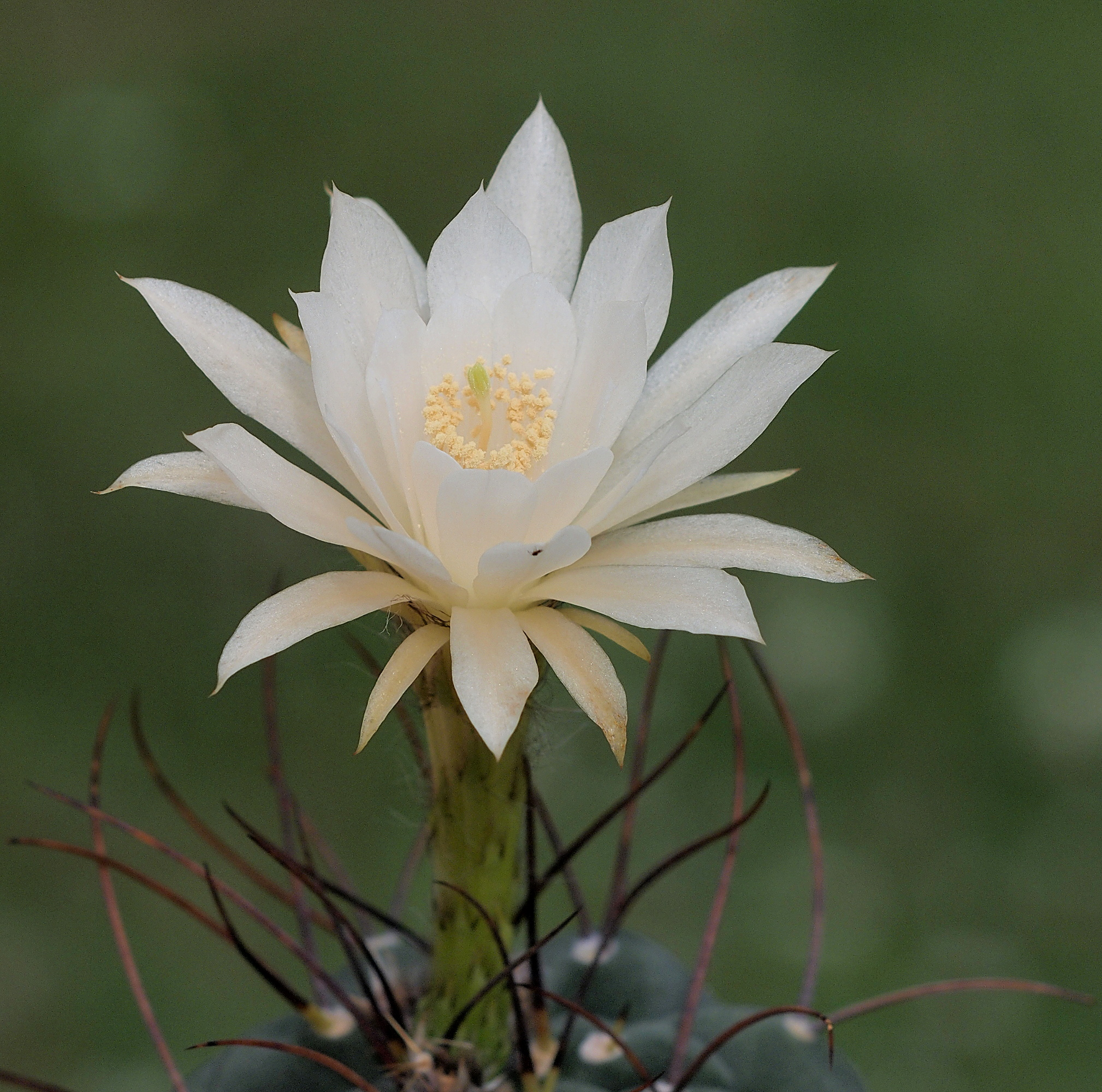
White-flowered form

== Distribution ==
Matucana madisoniorum is found in the Peruvian Amazonas Department northeast of the city of Bagua in the valley of the Río Marañón at altitudes of 400 to 1000 meters.

== Taxonomy ==
The first description as Borzicactus madisoniorum was in 1963 by Paul Clifford Hutchison. The specific epithet madisoniorum honors US attorney Marshall Pierce Madison (1895–1977), his wife Elena Eyre Madison, and the Madison Fund in San Francisco for supporting the University of California Botanical Garden. Gordon Douglas Rowley placed the species in the genus Matucana in 1973. Other nomenclature synonyms are Submatucana madisoniorum (Hutchison) Backeb. (1966), Loxanthocereus madisoniorum (Hutchison) Buxb. (1974), Eomatucana madisoniorum (Hutchison) F.Ritter (1981) and Anhaloniopsis madisoniorum (Hutchison) Mottram (2014).
