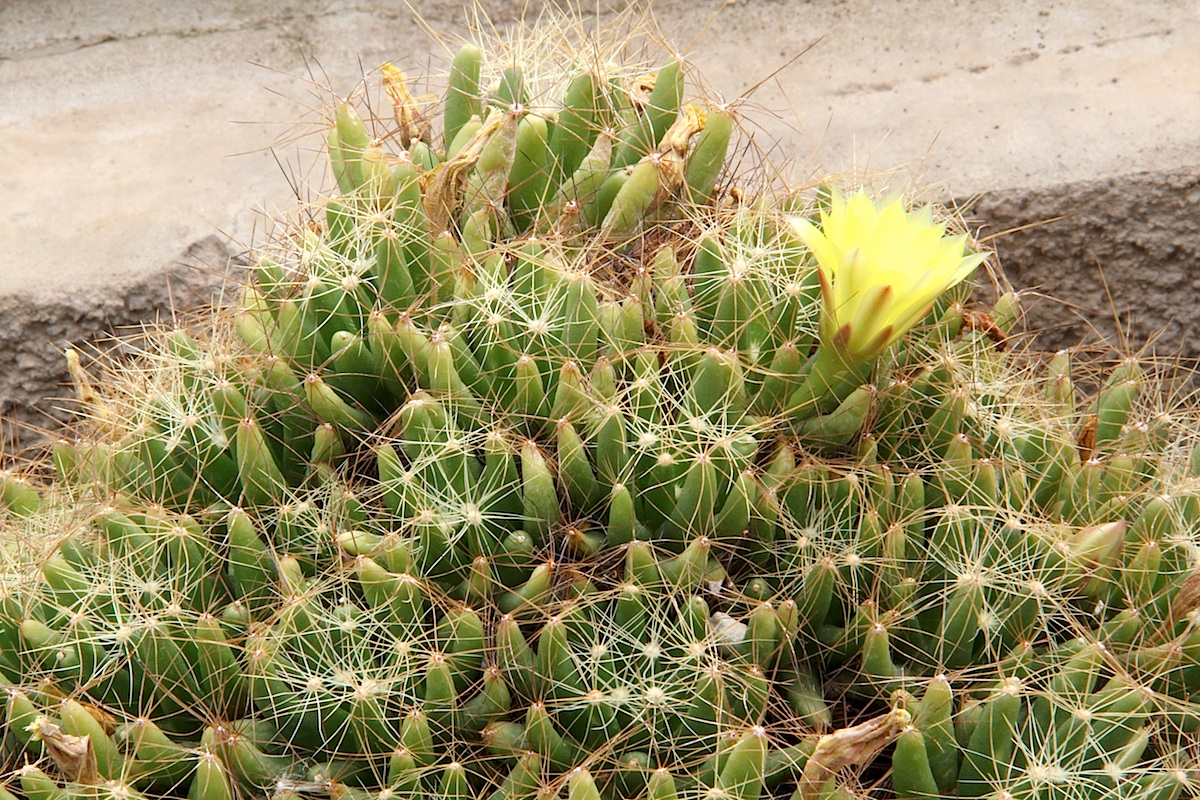

Conservation status
- Vulnerable (IUCN 3.1)

Scientific classification
- Kingdom: Plantae
- Clade: Tracheophytes
- Clade: Angiosperms
- Clade: Eudicots
- Order: Caryophyllales
- Family: Cactaceae
- Subfamily: Cactoideae
- Genus: Mammillaria
- Species: M. longimamma

Binomial name
- Mammillaria longimamma DC.

= Mammillaria longimamma =

Species of cactus

Mammillaria longimamma is a species of cactus from Hidalgo and Querétaro, Mexico.

== Phytochemistry ==
Contains longimammidine, longimammine, longimammamine, longimammatine, longimammosine, normacromerine and synephrine; undoubtedly, all these are phenethylamines (cyclised, i.e. tetrahydroisoquinoline alkaloids and beta-substituted phenethylamines; however, this species is not known to have any hallucinogenic effects on humans).
