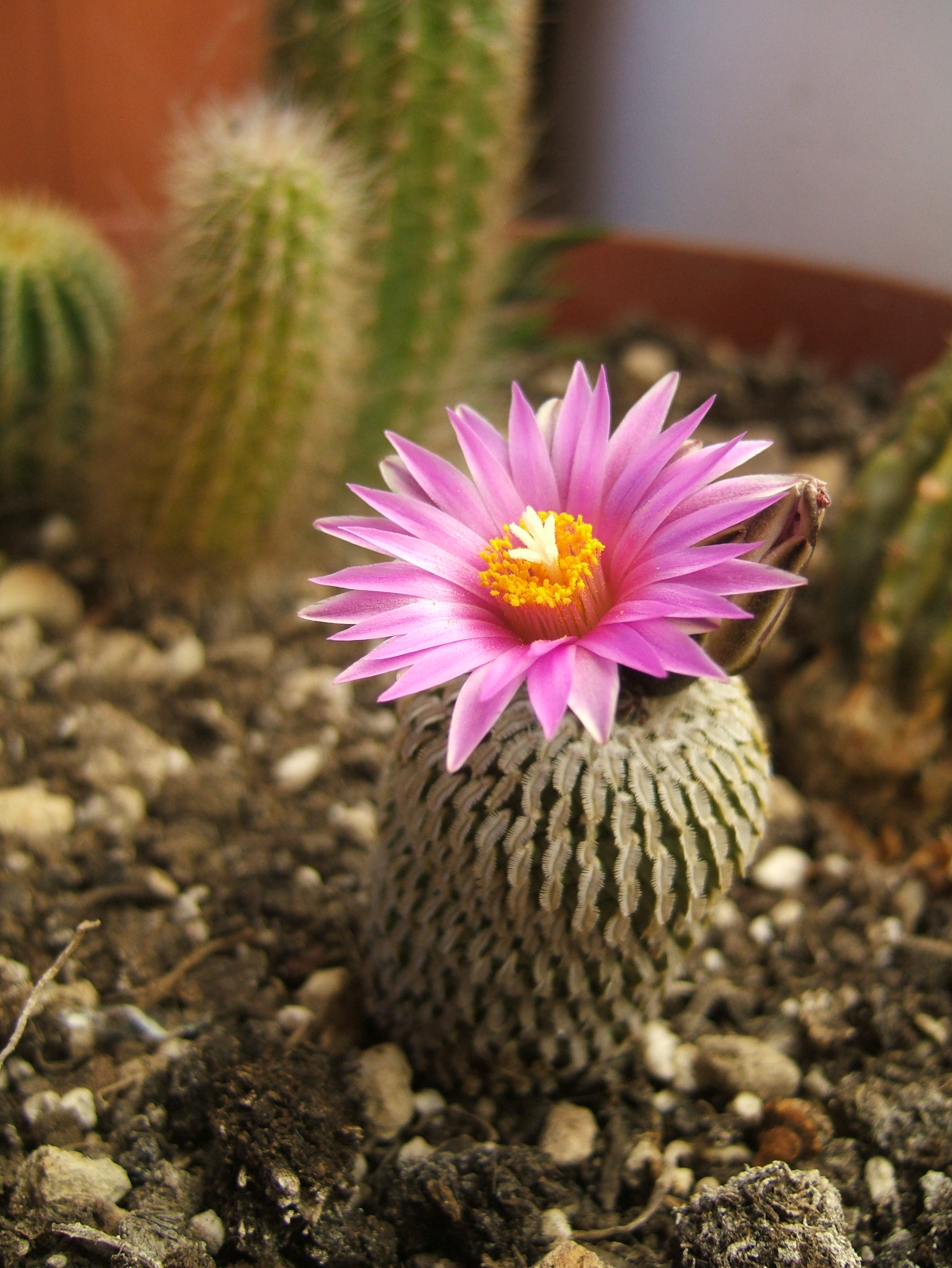

Conservation status
- Least Concern (IUCN 3.1)
- CITES Appendix I (CITES)

Scientific classification
- Kingdom: Plantae
- Clade: Tracheophytes
- Clade: Angiosperms
- Clade: Eudicots
- Order: Caryophyllales
- Family: Cactaceae
- Subfamily: Cactoideae
- Genus: Turbinicarpus
- Species: T. pseudopectinatus

Binomial name
- Turbinicarpus pseudopectinatus (Backeb.) Glass & R.C.Foster

= Turbinicarpus pseudopectinatus =

Species of cactus

Turbinicarpus pseudopectinatus is a species of plant in the family Cactaceae.

== Description ==
Turbinicarpus pseudopectinatus grows solitary with bluish green, depressed spherical bodies and has a fleshy taproot. The bodies, which appear white due to the dense thorns, reach heights of 2 to 3 centimeters and diameters of 2 to 3.5 centimeters. Their cusps are vertically elongated and 3 millimeters high. There is no central spine. The approximately 50 straight marginal spines are arranged in a comb shape and are one millimeter long.

The flowers are either white with a reddish or magenta central stripe, or rarely deep pink. They have a diameter of 1.8 to 2.6 centimeters. The greenish, dark fruits are approximately spherical and 7 to 8 millimeters long.

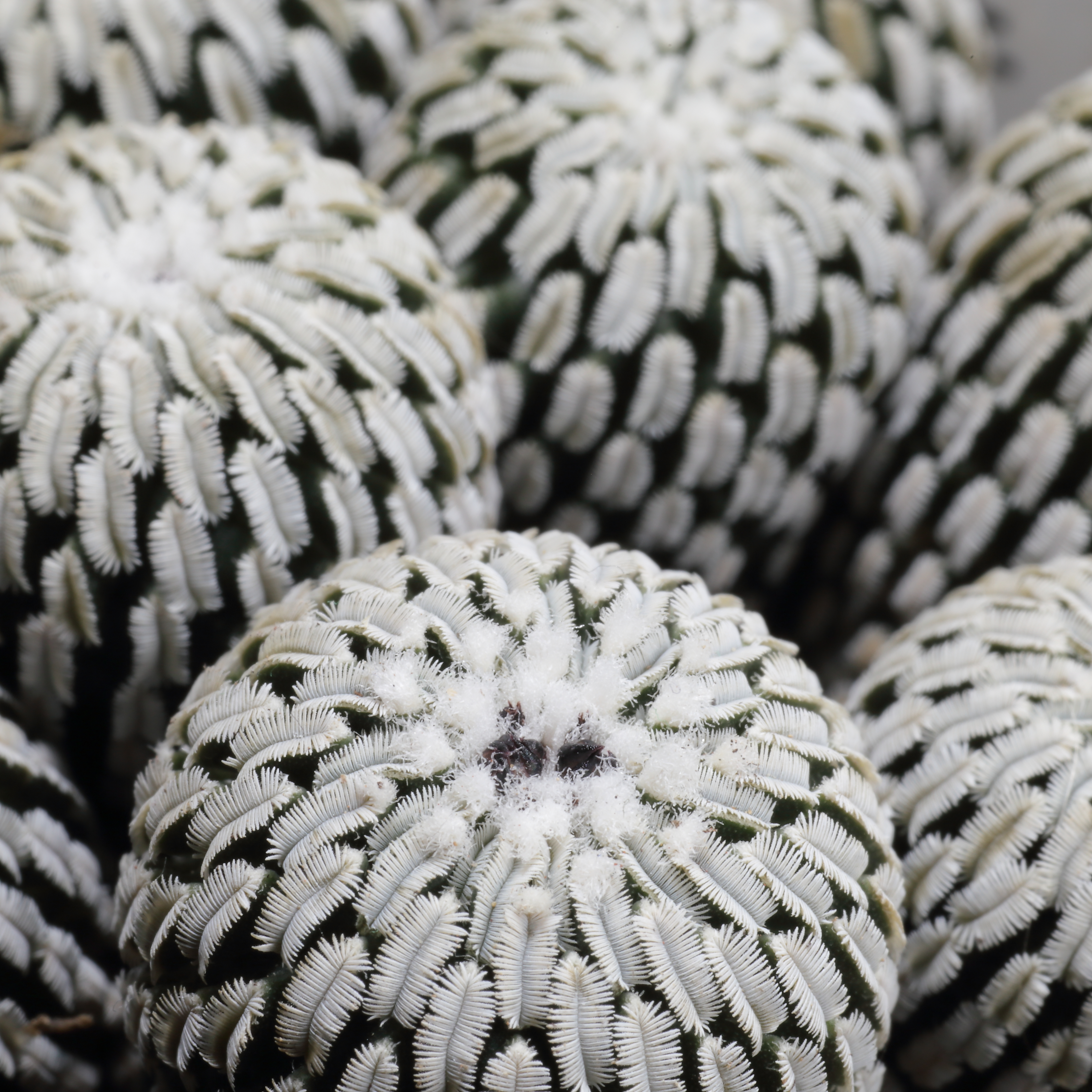
Plant

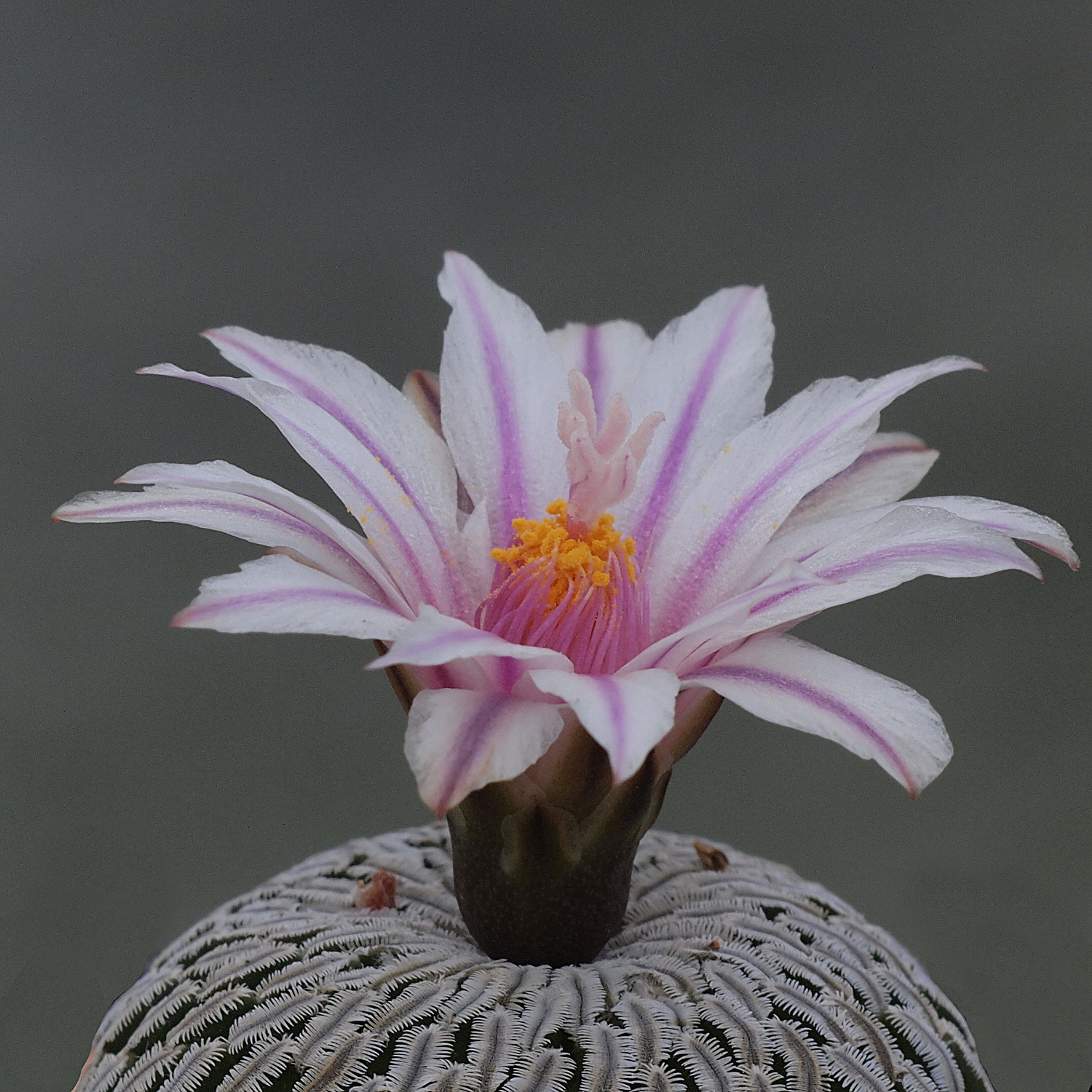
flower

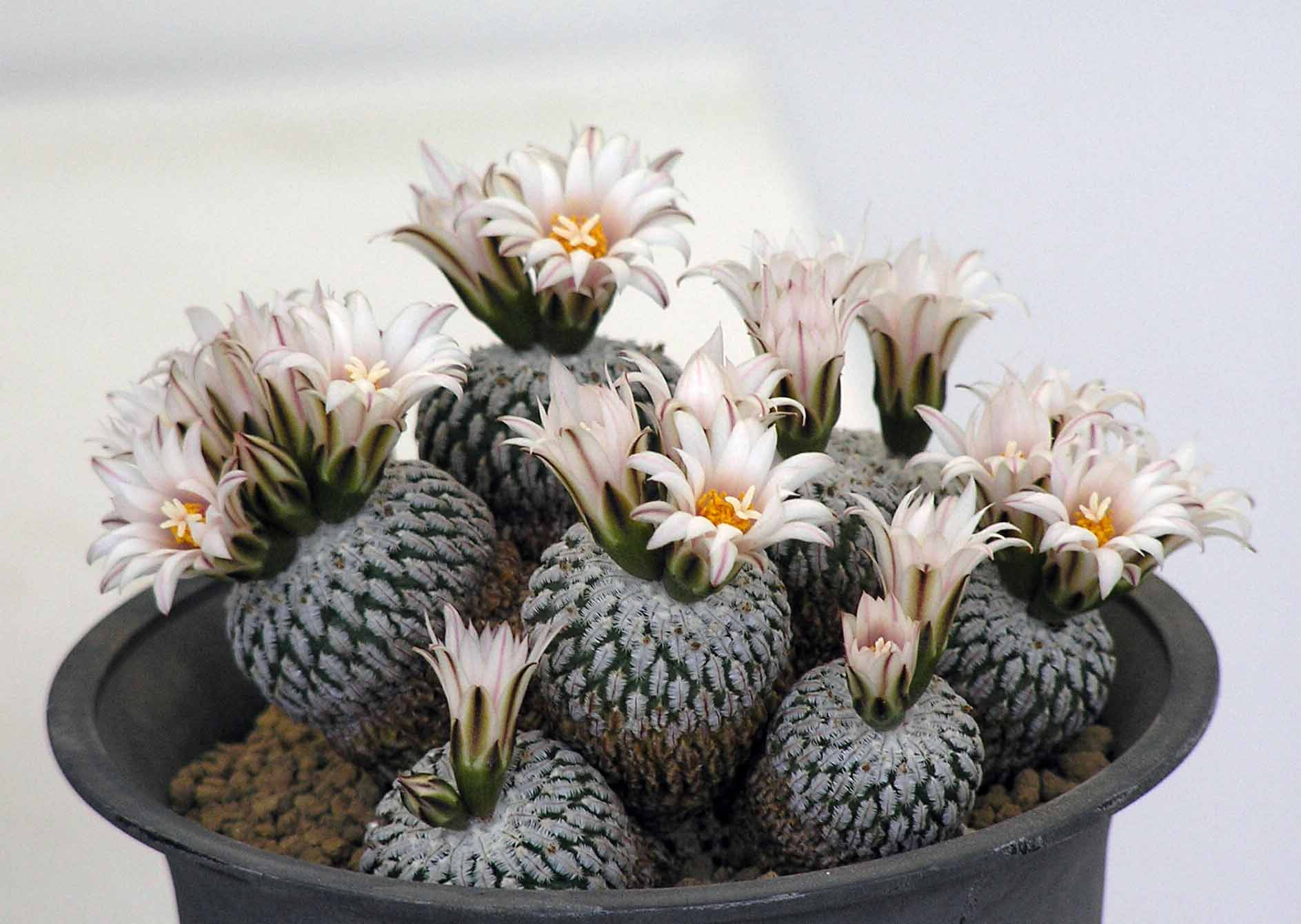
white flower form

== Distribution ==
It is endemic to Coahuila, Nuevo León, San Luis Potosí, and Tamaulipas states in northeastern Mexico. Its natural habitats are temperate forests and hot deserts.

== Taxonomy ==
The first description as Pelecyphora pseudopectinata was made in 1935 by Curt Backeberg. The specific epithet pseudopectinatus is derived from the Greek word pseudo for 'false' and the similarity to the species Echinocereus pectinatus. Charles Edward Glass and Robert Alan Foster placed the species in the genus Turbinicarpus in 1977. Further nomenclature synonyms are Mammillaria pseudopectinata (Backeb.) H.P.Kelsey & Dayton (1942), Normanbokea pseudopectinata (Backeb.) Kladiwa & Buxb. (1969), Thelocactus pseudopectinatus (Backeb.) E.F.Anderson & Boke (1969), Neolloydia pseudopectinata (Backeb.) E.F.Anderson (1986) and Pediocactus pseudopectinatus (Backeb.) Halda (1998).
