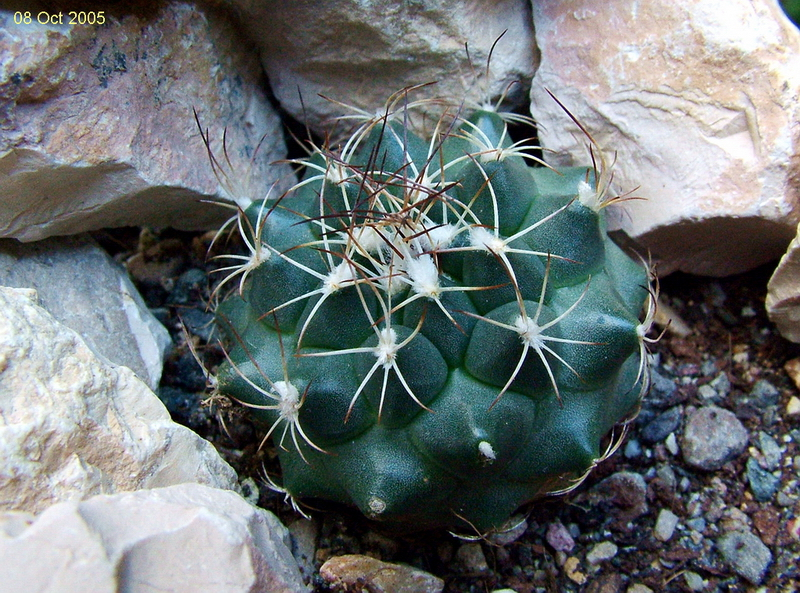

Conservation status
- Critically Endangered (IUCN 3.1)
- CITES Appendix I

Scientific classification
- Kingdom: Plantae
- Clade: Tracheophytes
- Clade: Angiosperms
- Clade: Eudicots
- Order: Caryophyllales
- Family: Cactaceae
- Subfamily: Cactoideae
- Genus: Turbinicarpus
- Species: T. laui

Binomial name
- Turbinicarpus laui Glass & R.C.Foster

= Turbinicarpus laui =

Species of cactus

Turbinicarpus laui is a species of plant in the family Cactaceae. It is endemic to Mexico. Its natural habitat is hot deserts. It is threatened by habitat loss.
