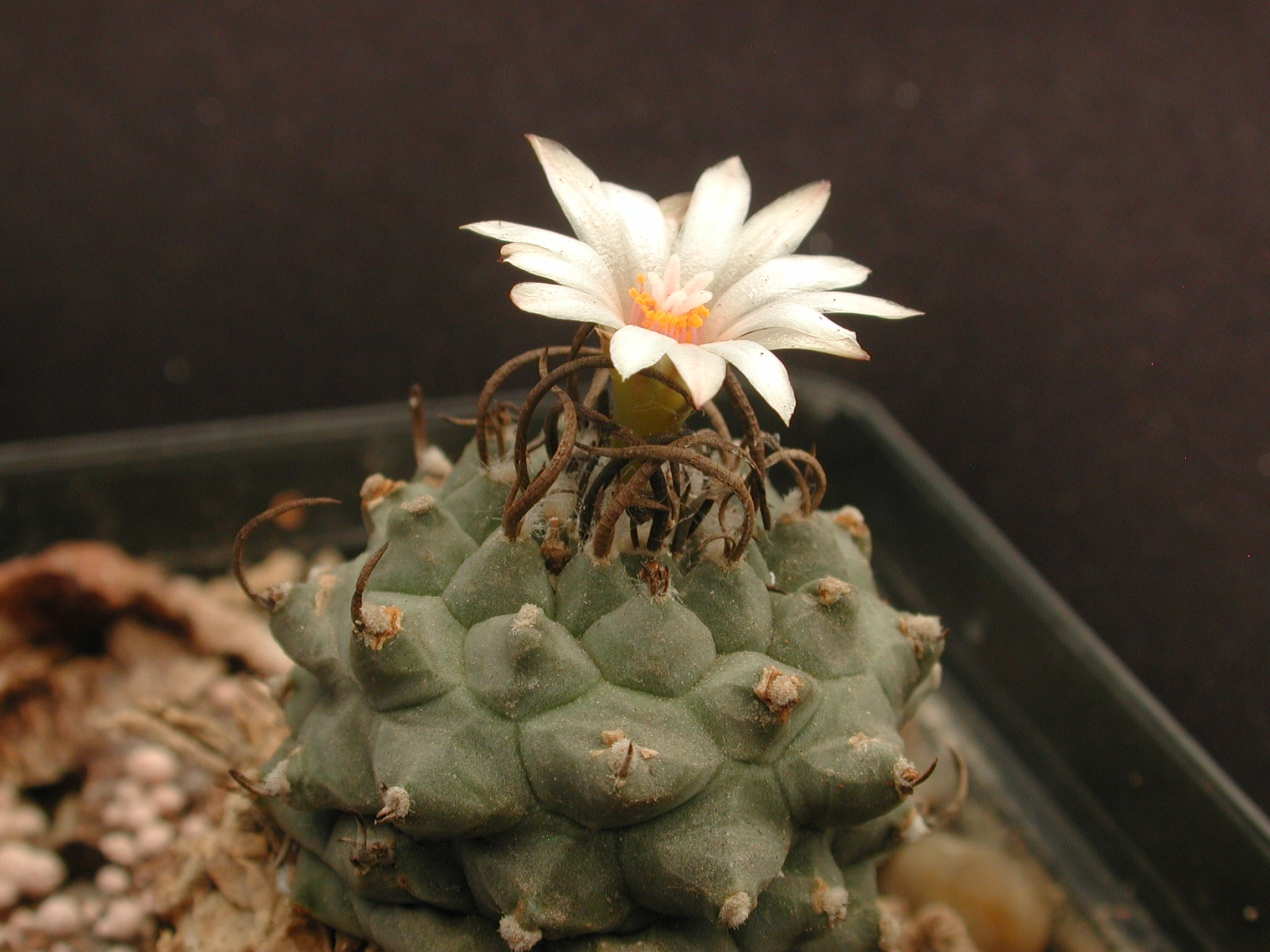

Conservation status
- Near Threatened (IUCN 3.1)
- CITES Appendix I

Scientific classification
- Kingdom: Plantae
- Clade: Tracheophytes
- Clade: Angiosperms
- Clade: Eudicots
- Order: Caryophyllales
- Family: Cactaceae
- Subfamily: Cactoideae
- Genus: Turbinicarpus
- Species: T. schmiedickeanus

Binomial name
- Turbinicarpus schmiedickeanus (Boed.) Buxb. & Backeb.

Subspecies
- See text.

= Turbinicarpus schmiedickeanus =

Species of cactus

Turbinicarpus schmiedickeanus is a species of plant in the family Cactaceae.

== Subspecies ==
As of March 2022, Plants of the World Online accepts the following subspecies, many of which have been treated as separate species:

- Turbinicarpus schmiedickeanus subsp. andersonii Mosco
- Turbinicarpus schmiedickeanus subsp. bonatzii (Gerhart Frank) Panar., syn. Turbinicarpus bonatzii Gerhart Frank
- Turbinicarpus schmiedickeanus subsp. dickisoniae (Glass & R.A.Foster) N.P.Taylor
- Turbinicarpus schmiedickeanus subsp. flaviflorus (Gerhart Frank & A.B.Lau) Glass
- Turbinicarpus schmiedickeanus subsp. gracilis (Glass & R.A.Foster) Glass
- Turbinicarpus schmiedickeanus subsp. jauernigii (G.Frank) D.R.Hunt, syn. Turbinicarpus jauernigii Gerhart Frank
- Turbinicarpus schmiedickeanus subsp. klinkerianus (Backeb. & H.Jacobsen) N.P.Taylor
- Turbinicarpus schmiedickeanus subsp. macrochele (Werderm.) N.P.Taylor
- Turbinicarpus schmiedickeanus subsp. rioverdensis (Gerhart Frank) Zachar, syn. Turbinicarpus rioverdensis Gerhart Frank
- Turbinicarpus schmiedickeanus subsp. rubriflorus (Gerhart Frank) Panar.
- Turbinicarpus schmiedickeanus subsp. sanchezii-mejoradae García-Mor., Gonz.-Bot. & Vargas-Vázq.
- Turbinicarpus schmiedickeanus subsp. schmiedickeanus
- Turbinicarpus schmiedickeanus subsp. schwarzii (Shurly) N.P.Taylor
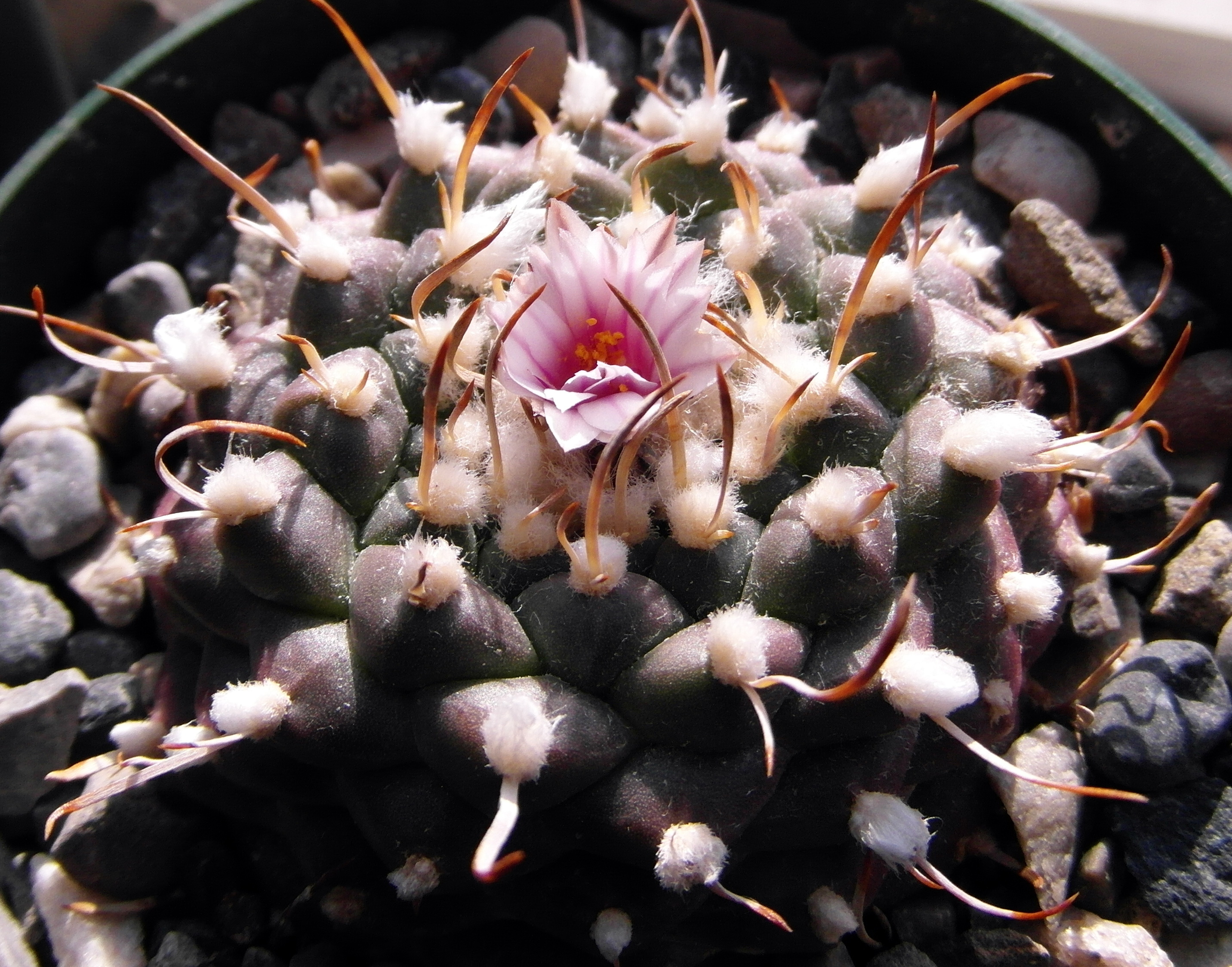
Turbinicarpus schmiedickeanus subsp. bonatzii

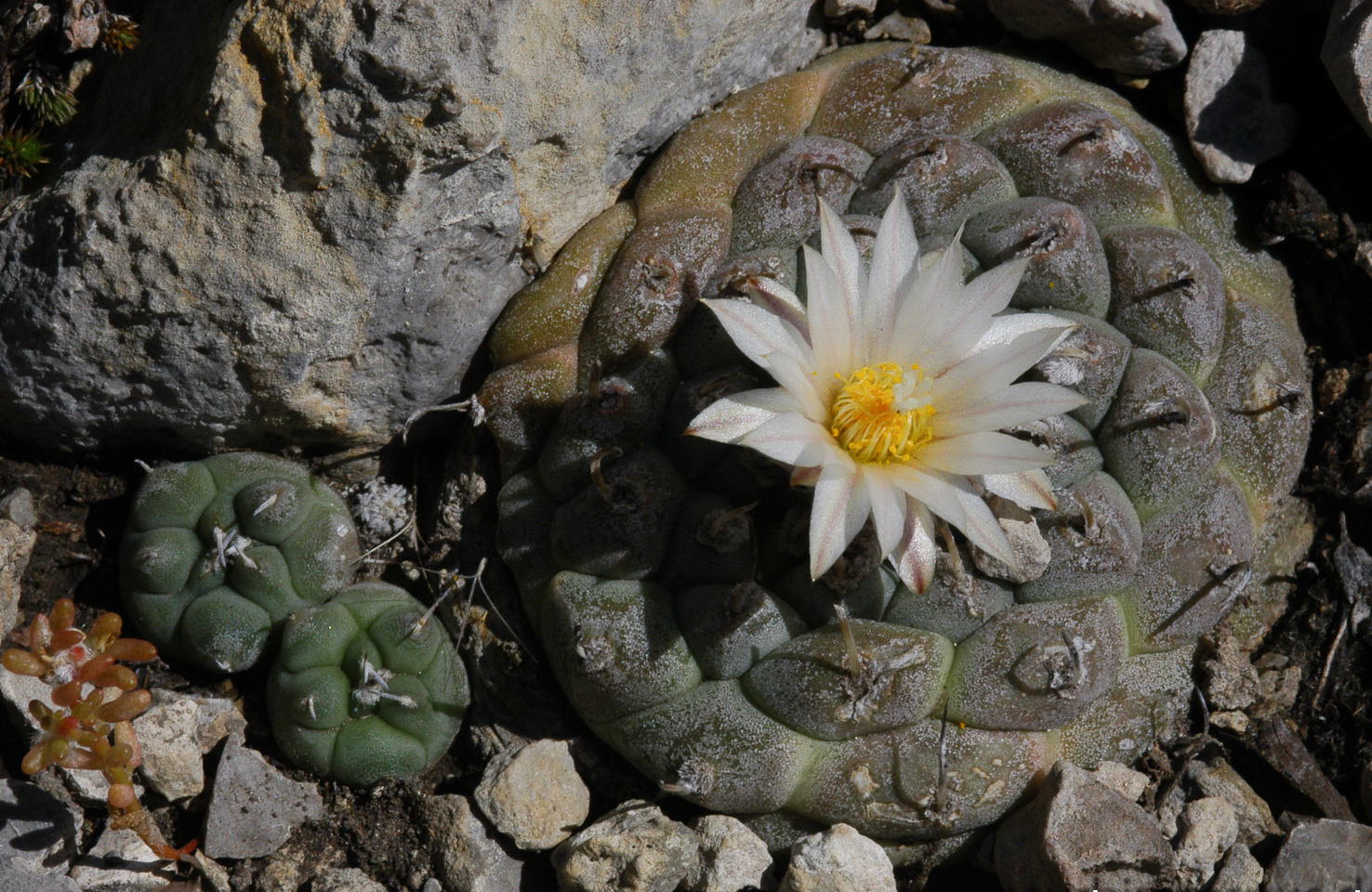
Turbinicarpus schmiedickeanus subsp. jauernigii

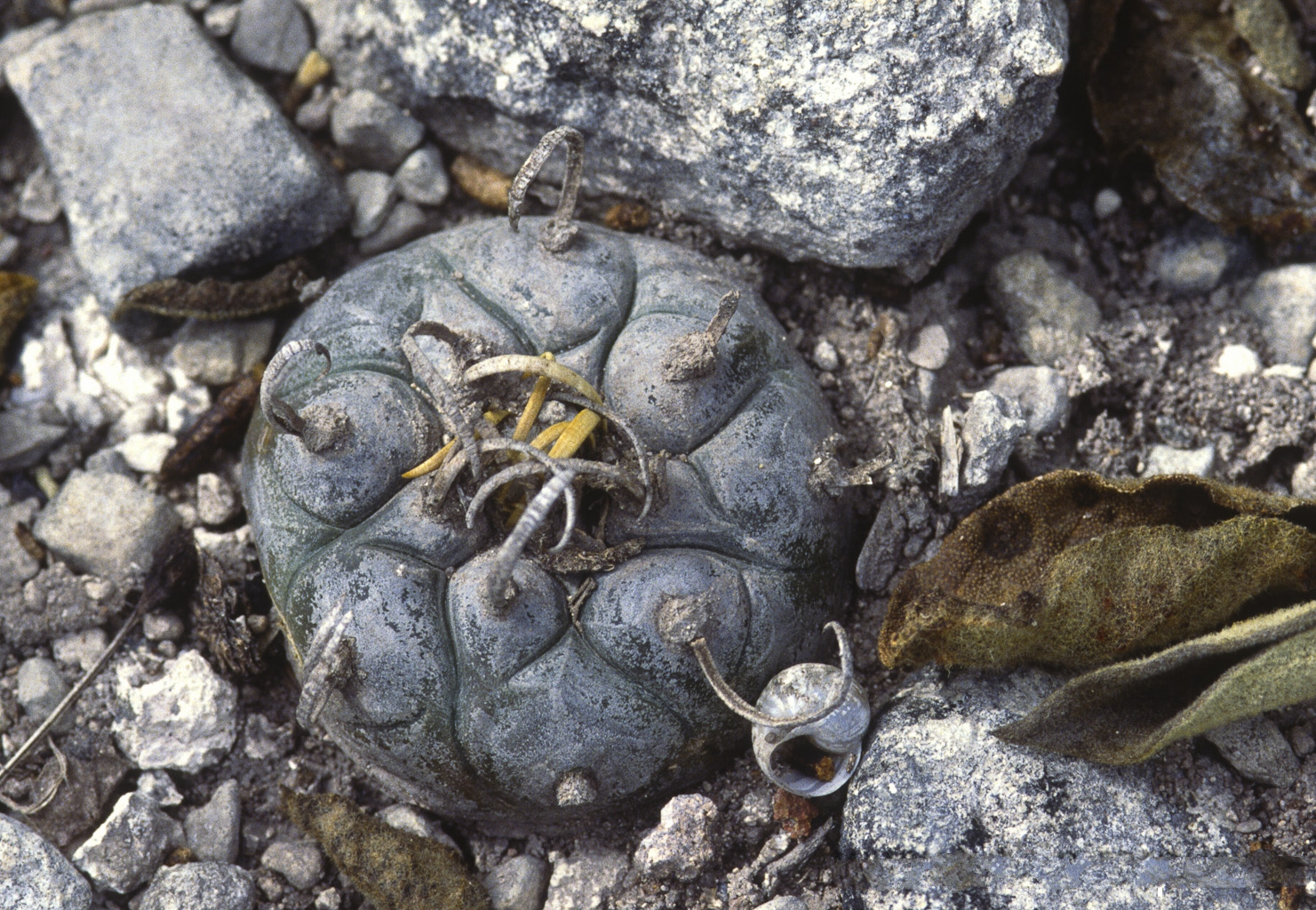
Turbinicarpus schmiedickeanus subsp. rioverdensis

== Distribution ==
It is endemic to Nuevo León, San Luis Potosí, Tamaulipas states of northeastern Mexico. Its natural habitat is hot deserts.

It is threatened by habitat loss.
