= Erich Werdermann =

German botanist (1892–1959)

- Born: 2 March 1893; Berlin, Kingdom of Prussia, German Empire
- Died: 20 April 1959 (aged 66)
- Education: Humboldt University of Berlin; University of Jena
- Scientific career
- Fields: Botany

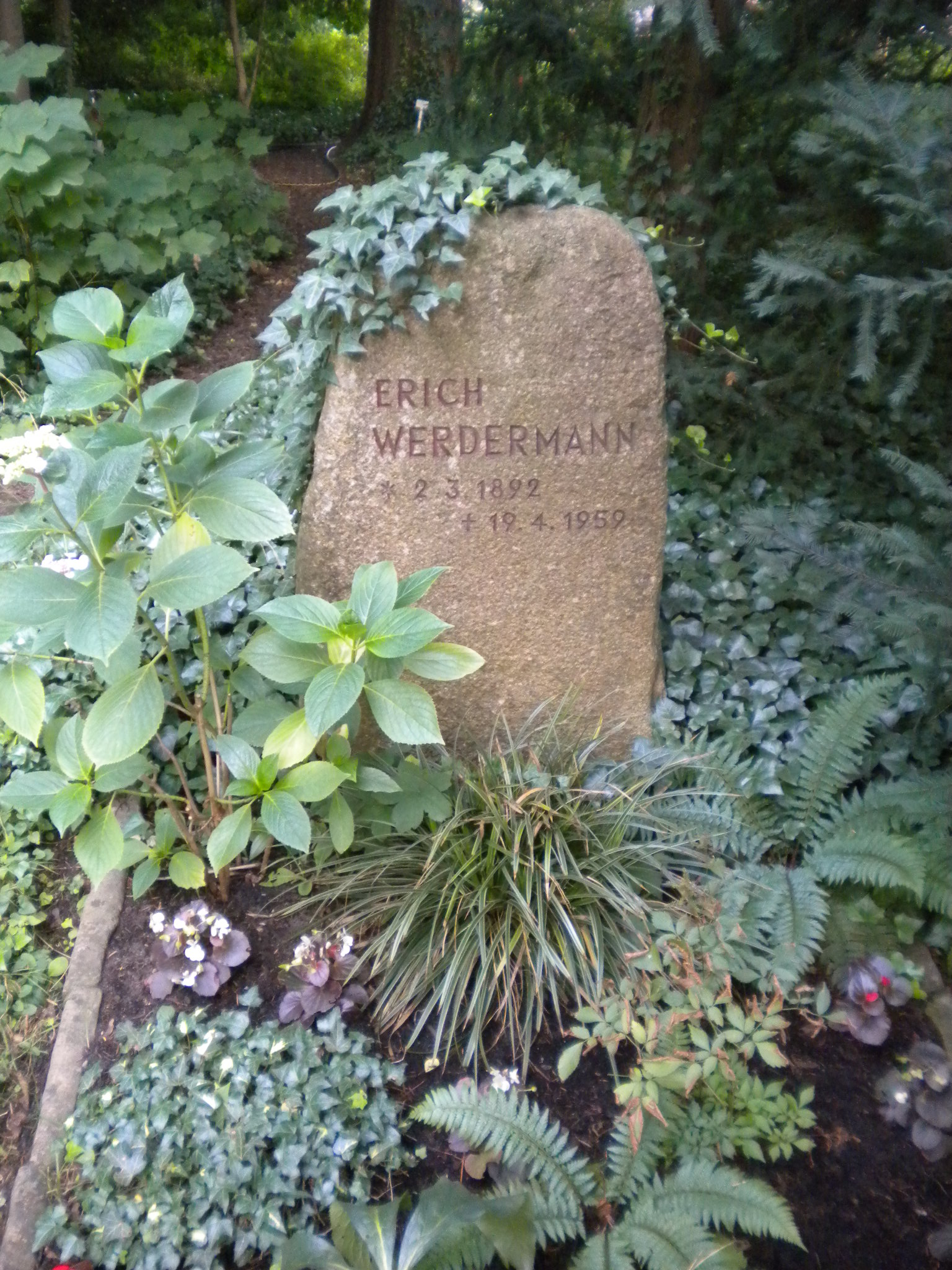
tombstone of Erich Werdermann

Erich Werdermann (2 March 1892 – 20 April 1959) was a German botanist.

Born in Berlin, Erich Werdermann was the son of the landowner Carl Werdermann. He first studied in Jena, but then switched to Friedrich Wilhelm University (now called Humboldt University of Berlin) in Berlin. In 1914 shortly before his graduation, Werdermann was enlisted in the army and in 1915 promoted to the rank of officer. After recovering from serious wounds suffered in 1918, he was able to continue his studies. The following year Werdermann graduated as a plant physiologist at Gottlieb Haberlandt. From 1919 to 1920 he worked at the Imperial Biological Institute in Berlin, where Peter Claussen (1877–1959) sparked his interest in fungi. From 1920 to 1921, Mann was a research assistant at the Imperial Health Office with Ernst Friedrich Gilg, who introduced him to the Botanical Museum Berlin-Dahlem. In 1921, he succeeded Rudolf Schlechter as the curator of mushrooms in the herbarium of the museum.

In 1923 Werdermann began a four-year research trip to Chile and neighboring countries. After his return he succeeded Friedrich Vaupel as curator of the Botanical Garden and took care of cacti and other succulents in the herbarium. He was in charge of the scientific reviews of the stocks in the greenhouses of the Botanical Garden. In 1927 he was elected as President of the German Cactus Society, a position he held until 1934. Werdermann traveled to Madrid to see the collections of Hipólito Ruiz López and José Antonio Pavón Jiménez. In 1929, he married Hildegard Hauser.

In 1930 Werdermann published his work in 42 parts along with his own color photographs on Blooming cacti and other succulent plants. He made a trip of the North East of Brazil in 1932. In 1933 he accepted an invitation from the Huntington Botanical Gardens in Los Angeles. Prior to his stay there he traveled from March to May to Mexico, Texas and Arizona. After completing his studies in Los Angeles, he returned in late October to Mexico.

During World War II his scientific library and collection in the botanical garden on 1 March 1943 was destroyed. After the war, Werdermann dedicated the reconstruction of the botanical garden and greenhouses. In 1948 he gave lectures and practical courses of pharmacognosy at the newly founded Free University of Berlin. In 1950 he was among the participants of the 7th International Botanical Congress in Stockholm. Werdermann worked as acting director of the botanical garden in 1951 and became the director of in 1955. On 1 April 1958 he retired.

Werdermann died in 1959 in Hamburg and was buried in the botanical garden next to Adolf Engler and Ludwig Diels.

Otto Eugen Schulz named in his honor in 1928 the genus Werdermannia of the cabbage family. Alberto Vojtech Fric honored him in 1930, with the naming of the genus Neowerdermannia of cacti. Eleven species bear Werdermann's name.
