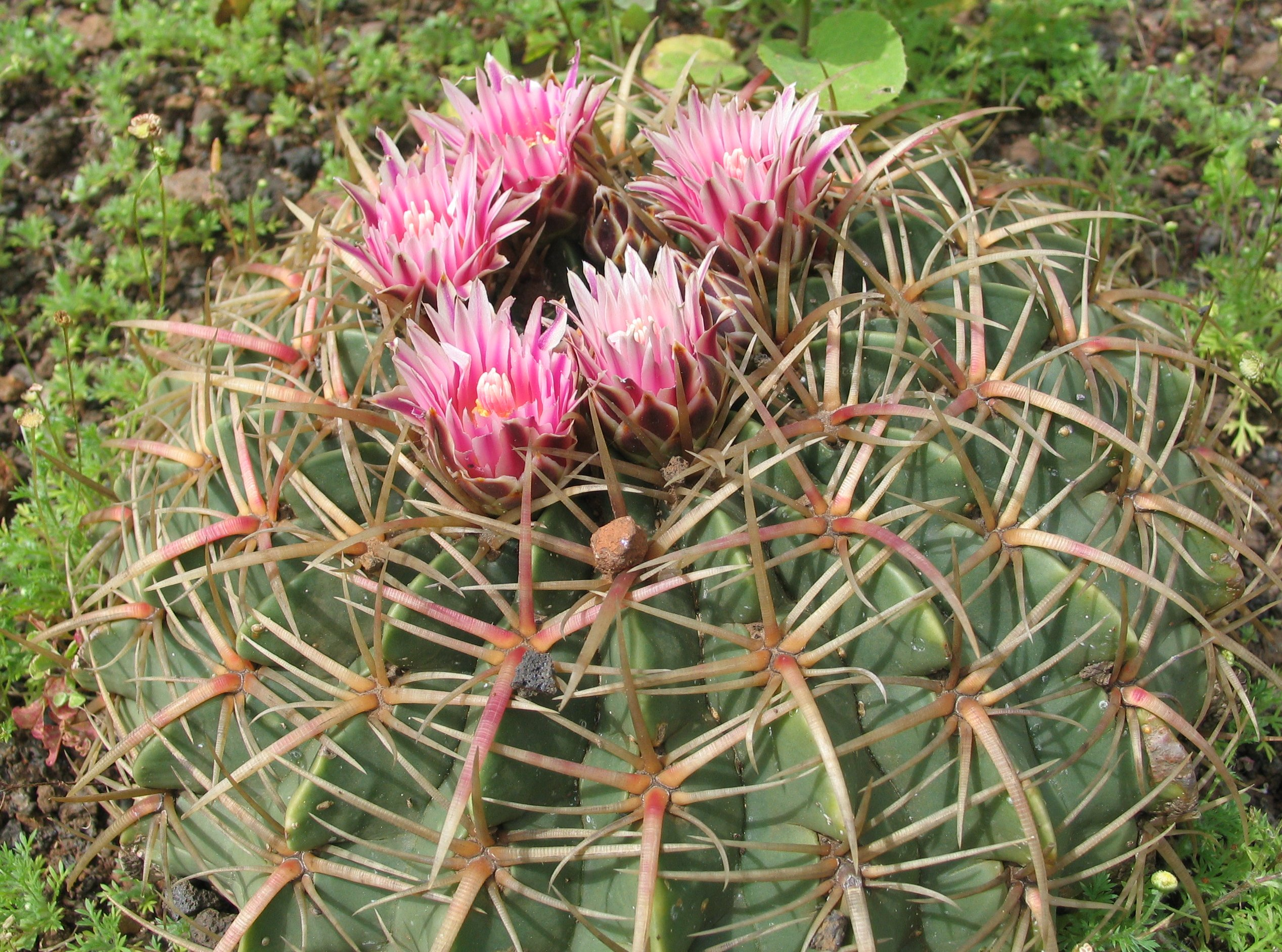

Conservation status
- Vulnerable (IUCN 3.1)

Scientific classification
- Kingdom: Plantae
- Clade: Tracheophytes
- Clade: Angiosperms
- Clade: Eudicots
- Order: Caryophyllales
- Family: Cactaceae
- Subfamily: Cactoideae
- Genus: Ferocactus
- Species: F. macrodiscus

Binomial name
- Ferocactus macrodiscus (Mart.) Britton & Rose 1922

Synonyms
- Bisnaga macrodisca (Mart.) Doweld 1999; Echinocactus macrodiscus Mart. 1832; Bisnaga macrodisca subsp. septentrionalis (J.Meyrán) Doweld 1999; Echinocactus campylacanthus Scheidw. 1840; Echinocactus macrodiscus f. multiflorus (Rud.Mey.) Schelle 1926; Echinocactus macrodiscus var. multiflorus Rud.Mey. 1914; Echinofossulocactus campylacanthus Lawr. 1841; Ferocactus macrodiscus var. septentrionalis J.Meyrán 1987; Ferocactus macrodiscus subsp. septentrionalis (J.Meyrán) N.P.Taylor 1998

= Ferocactus macrodiscus =

Species of cactus

Ferocactus macrodiscus is a species of cactus (family Cactaceae) in the genus Ferocactus from Guanahuato and Oaxaca States, Mexico.

== Description ==
It has a globular body about 4 inches (10 cm) high and up to 18 inches (46 cm) wide, with typically in maturity 13 to 21 vertical ridges or ribs, based on its adherence to the primary Fibonacci series. Areoles are 5 to 10 mm long with 1-4 central spines that are 3.5 cm long and 6-8 radial spines that are 2-3 cm long. Spines range from yellow to red, and curved. The plant blooms from early spring to summer. It is most noteworthy for its pink, approx. two inch (5 cm) wide flowers, which have approximately 200 tepals arranged in a continuous spiral series from perfect sepals on the outside gradually morphing into perfect petals near the center. Fruits are red and spherical 4 x 3 cm with 2 mm long dark brown seeds.

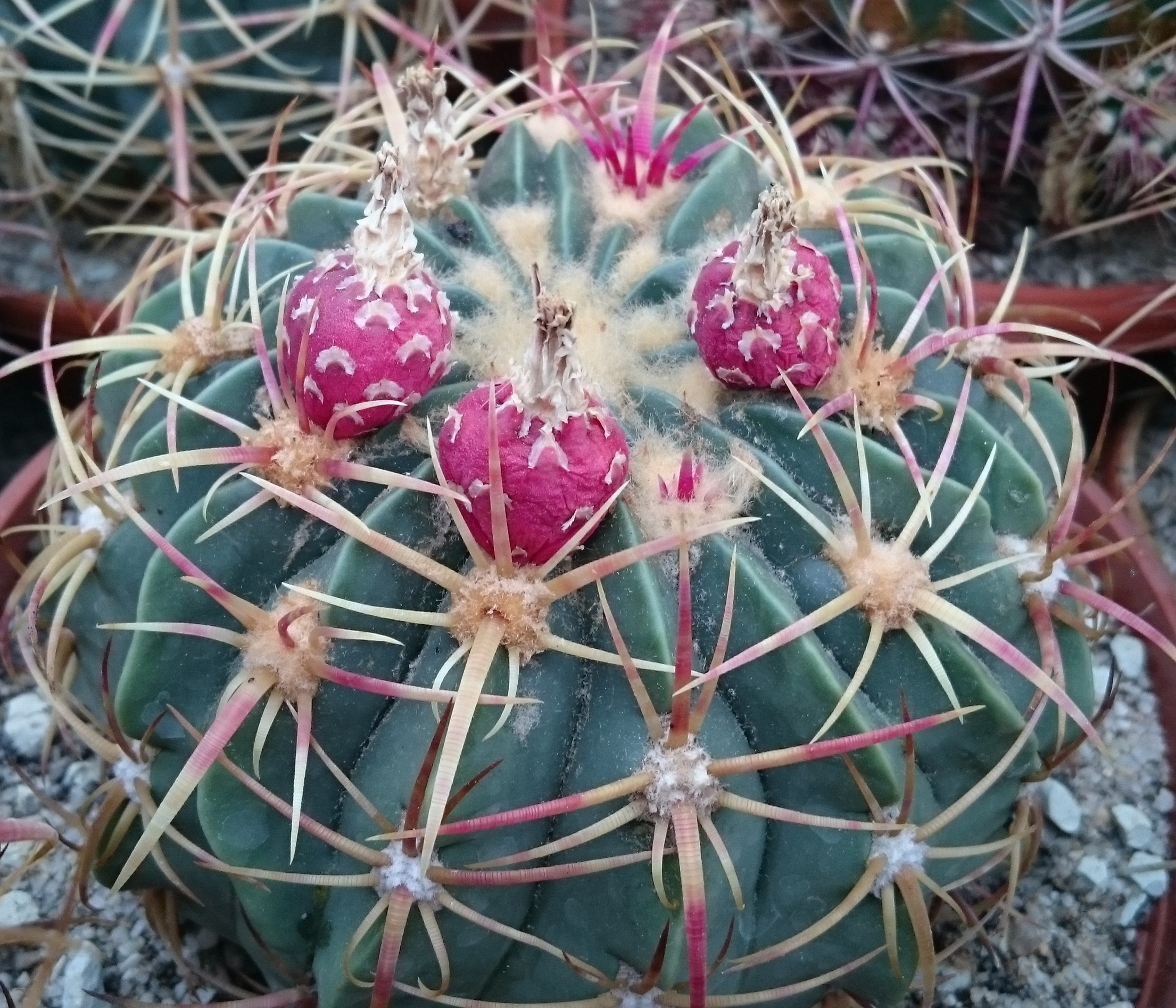
fruits

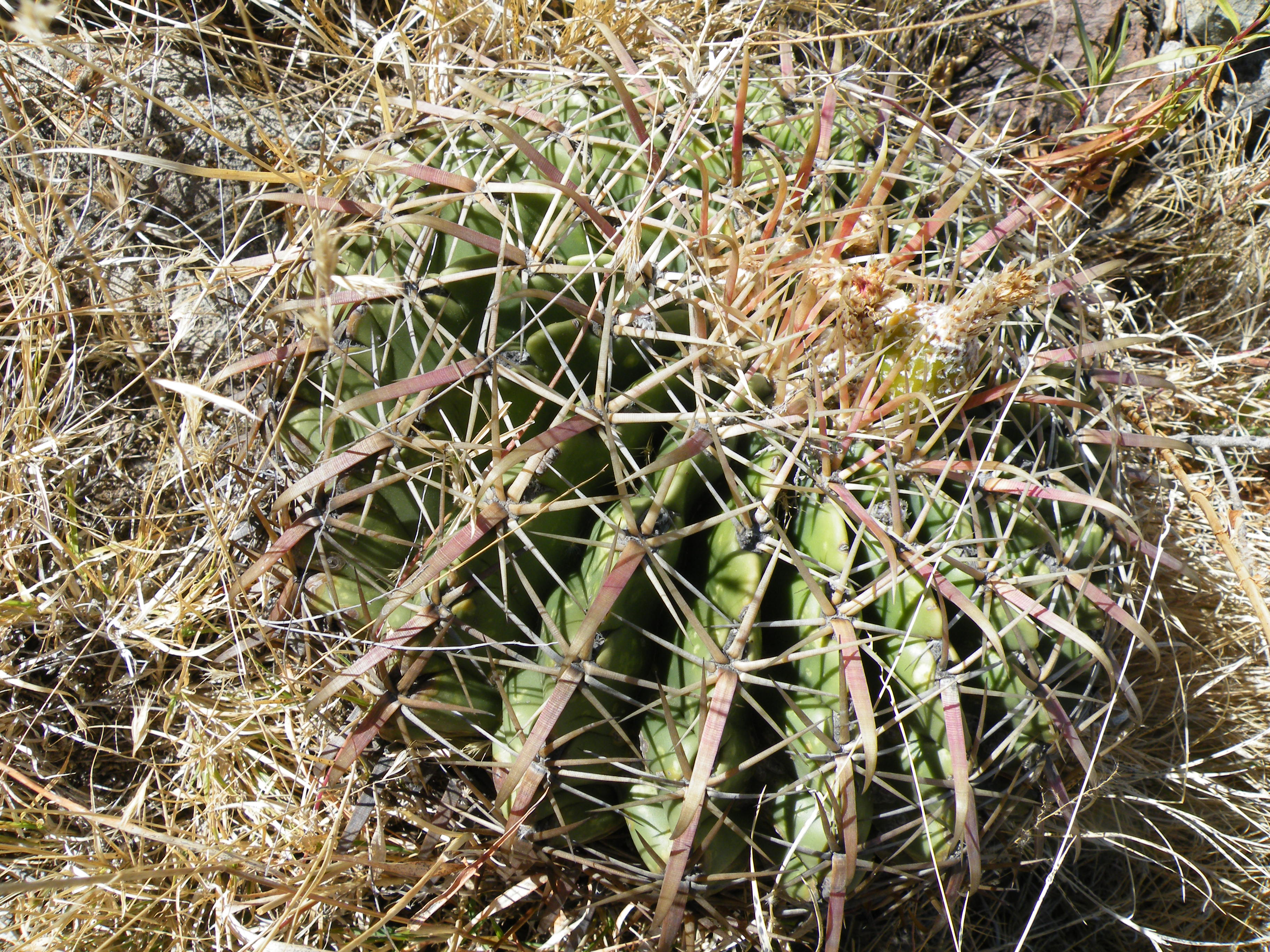
Plant

== Distribution ==
Ferocactus macrodiscus is found in growing in Oak forest and grasslands San Luis Potosí, Querétaro, Guanajuato, Puebla and Oaxaca states of Mexico at elevations of 2,300 to 2,600 meters.

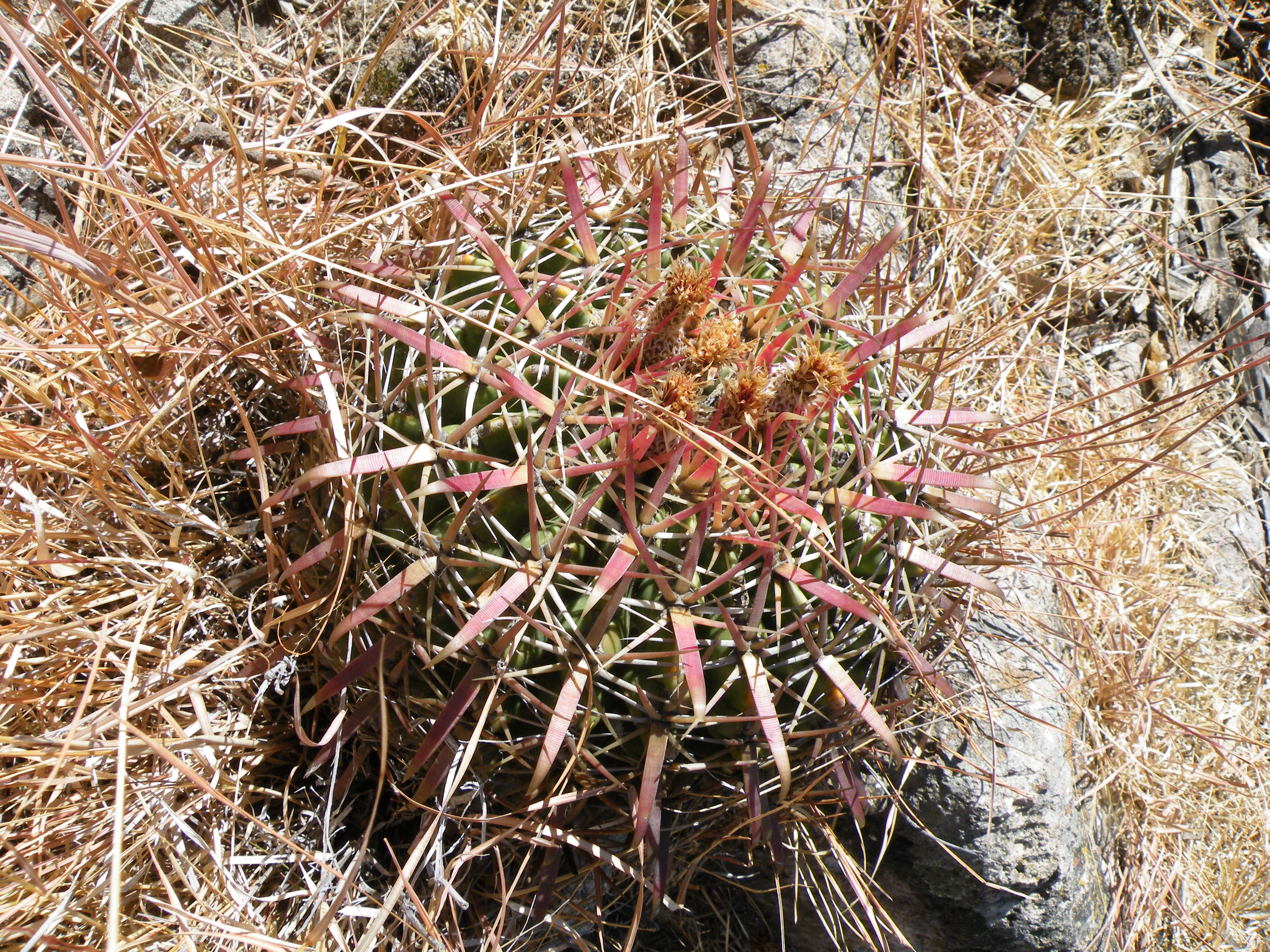
Plant growing in Oaxaca, Mexico

== Taxonomy ==
Carl Friedrich Philipp von Martius first described Echinocactus macrodiscus in 1832. The name "macrodiscus" comes from the Greek words "makros" meaning 'large' and "diskos" meaning 'disc,' referring to the species' large, flat, disc-shaped shoots. In 1922, Nathaniel Lord Britton and Joseph Nelson Rose classified it under the genus Ferocactus.
