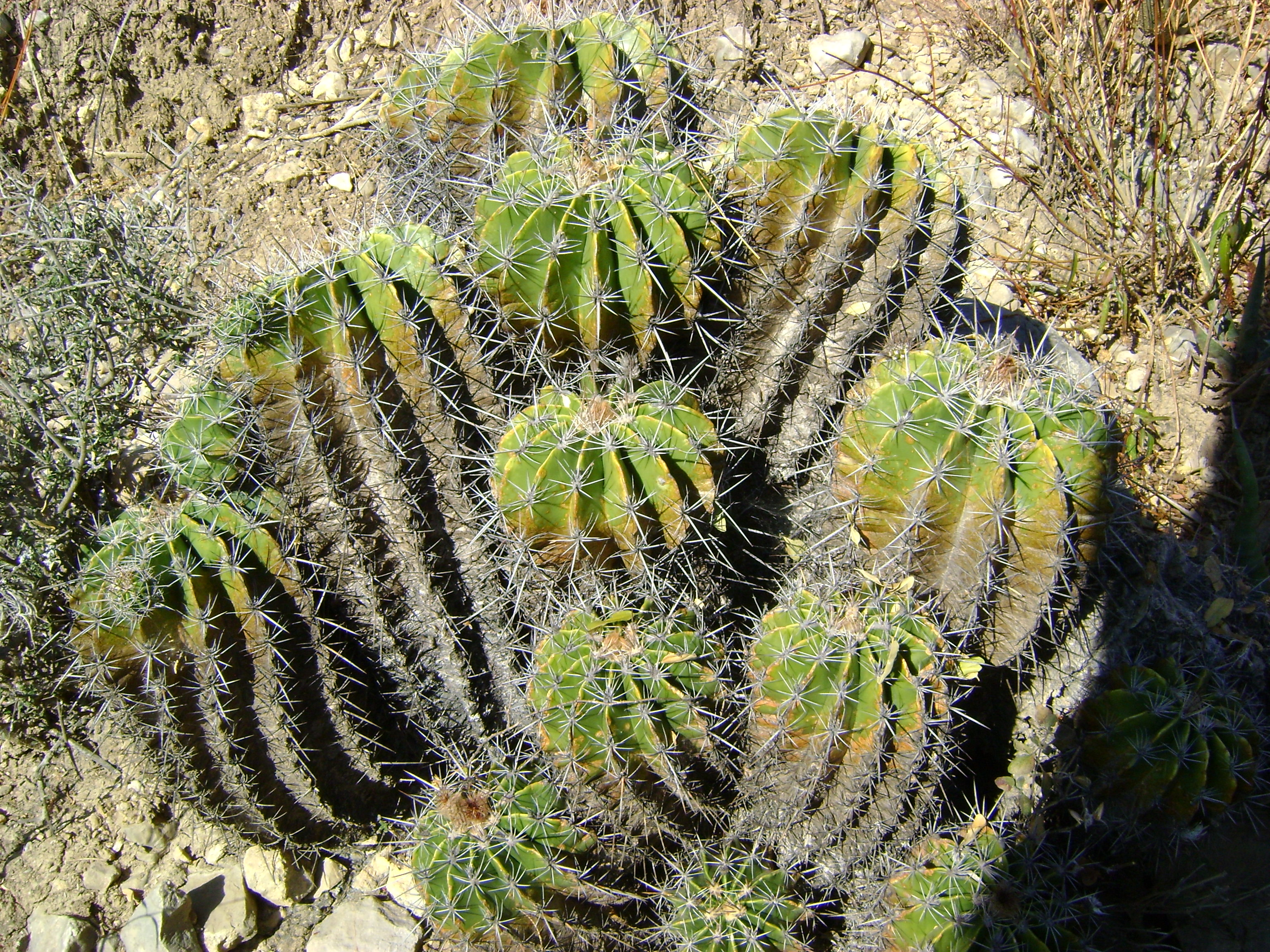

Conservation status
- Endangered (IUCN 3.1)

Scientific classification
- Kingdom: Plantae
- Clade: Tracheophytes
- Clade: Angiosperms
- Clade: Eudicots
- Order: Caryophyllales
- Family: Cactaceae
- Subfamily: Cactoideae
- Genus: Ferocactus
- Species: F. flavovirens

Binomial name
- Ferocactus flavovirens (Scheidw.) Britton & Rose 1922

Synonyms
- Bisnaga flavovirens (Scheidw.) Orcutt 1926; Echinocactus flavovirens Scheidw. 1841; Parrycactus flavovirens (Scheidw.) Doweld 2000

= Ferocactus flavovirens =

Species of cactus

Ferocactus flavovirens is a species of Ferocactus native to Mexico.

== Description ==
Ferocactus flavovirens forms clusters with plants growing up to 1 meter tall and more than 2 meters wide, with numerous spherical to cylindrical shoots. These shoots are light or gray-green, reaching heights of 30 to 40 cm (12 to 16 in) and diameters of up to 40 cm (16 in), with 13 sharp ribs and widely spaced areoles. The needle-like spines are light brown to gray, with the higher spines occasionally lighter and bristle-like. It has four to six central spines up to 8 cm (3.1 in) long, with the lowest directed downwards, and 12 to 20 radial spines.

The funnel-shaped, yellow to yellowish-red flowers emerge from younger areoles at the shoot tip, reaching lengths of up to 3 cm (1.2 in) and diameters of 2.5 cm (0.98 in). Its ellipsoid fruits are up to 2.8 cm (1.1 in) long, red, and covered in long, brown, bristly-tipped scales.

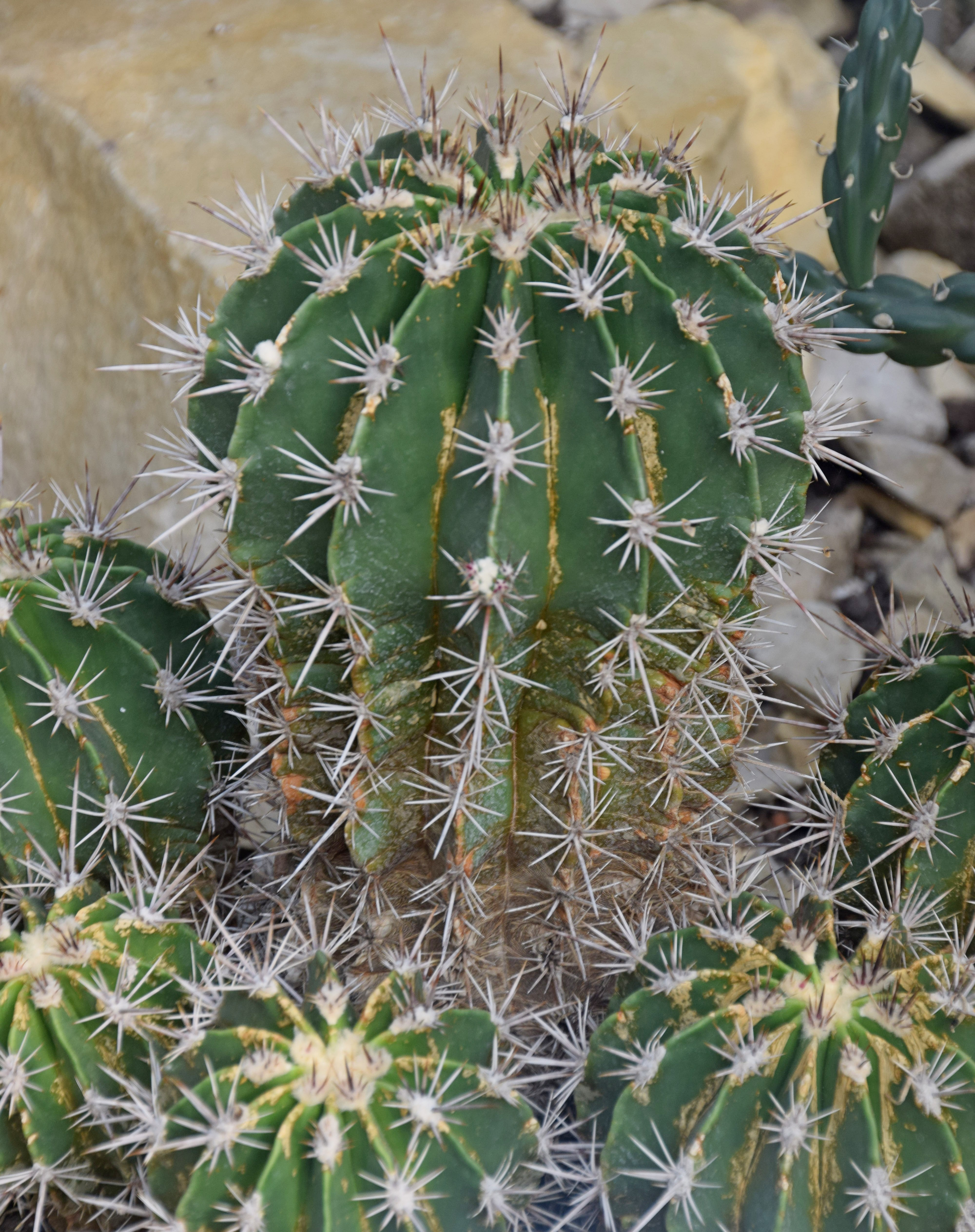
Plant

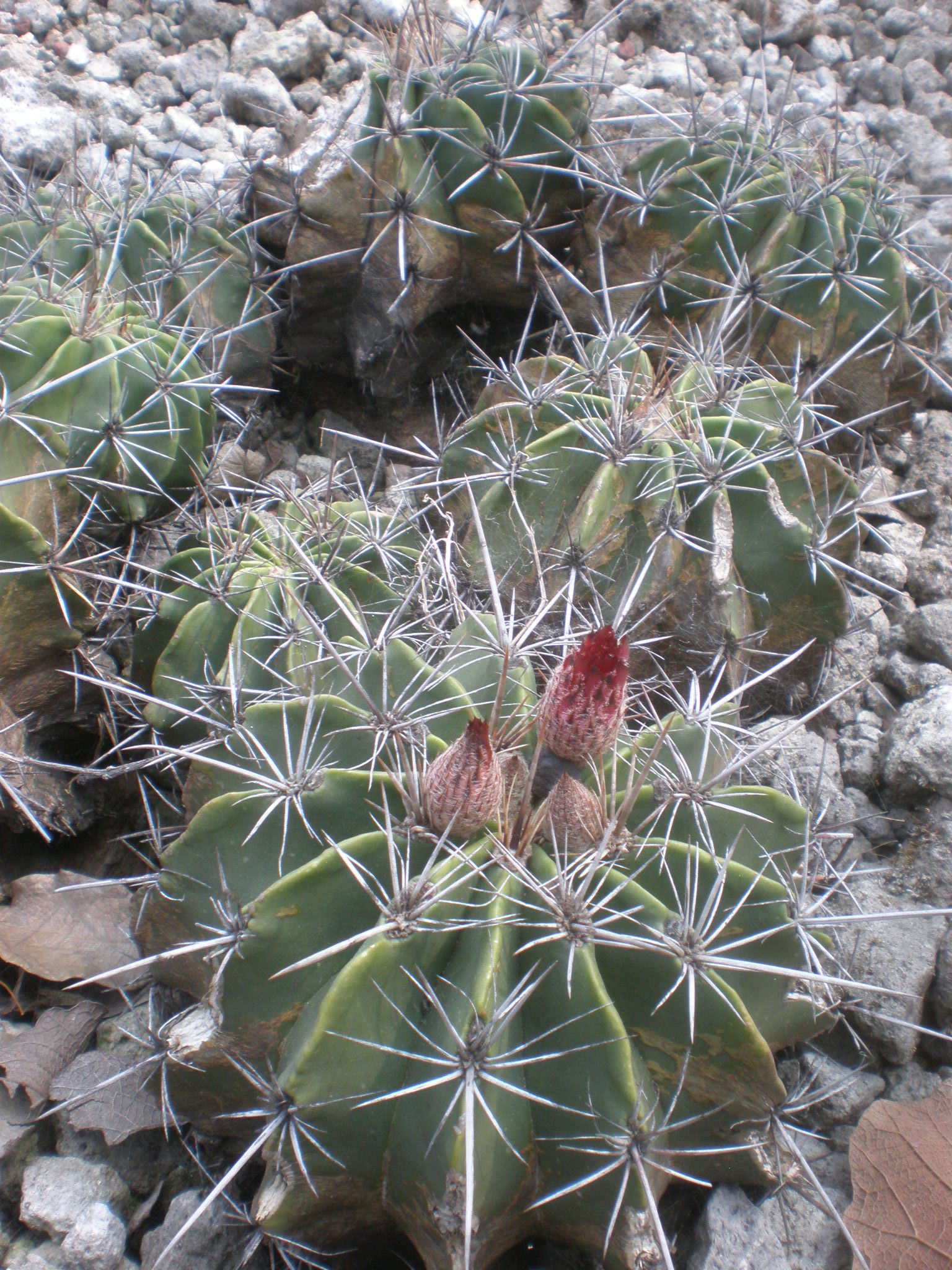
buds

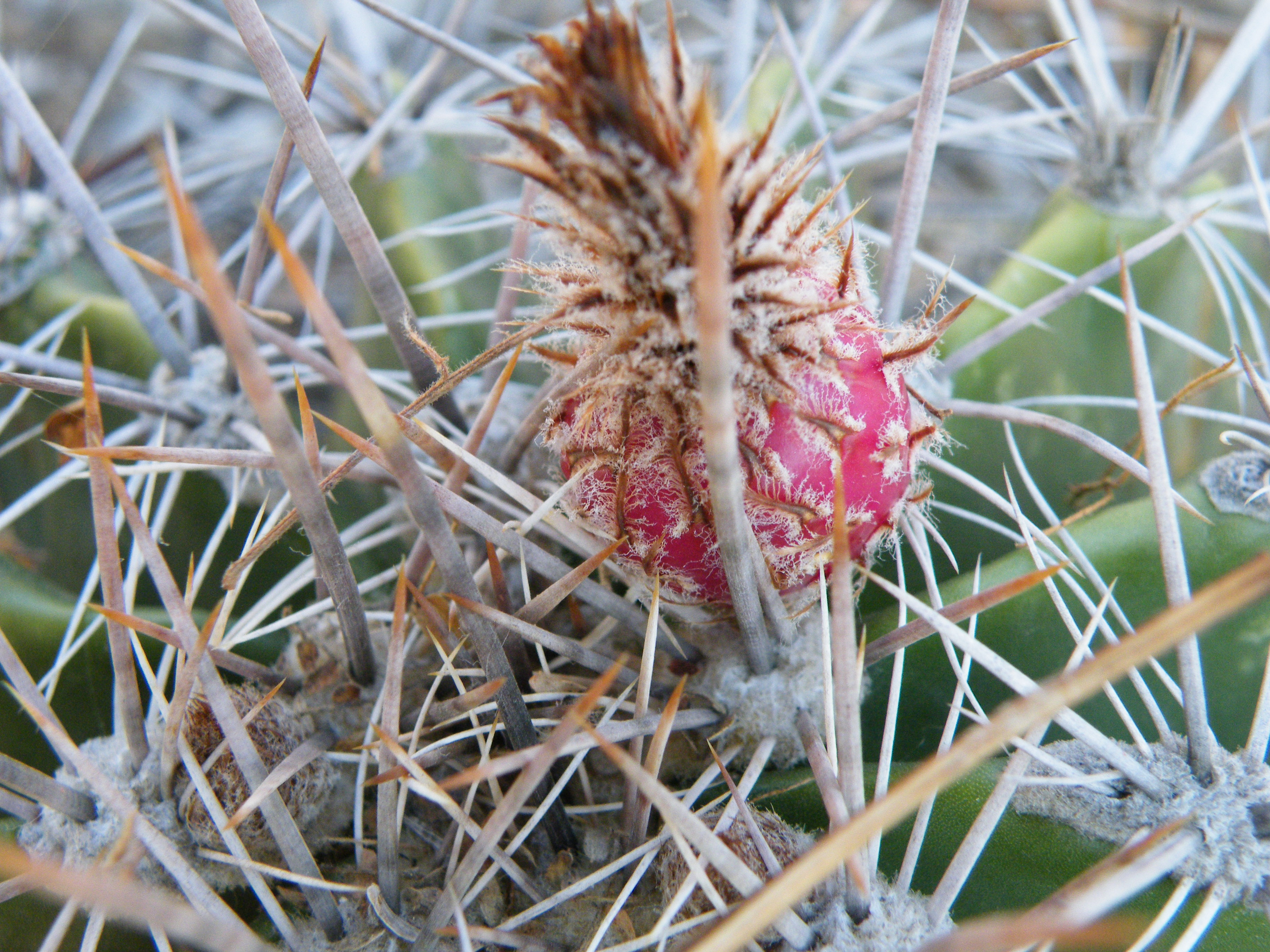
Fruit

== Distribution ==
Ferocactus flavovirens is a clustering cactus that grows in Mexico's Puebla and Oaxaca states on dry limestone hillsides.

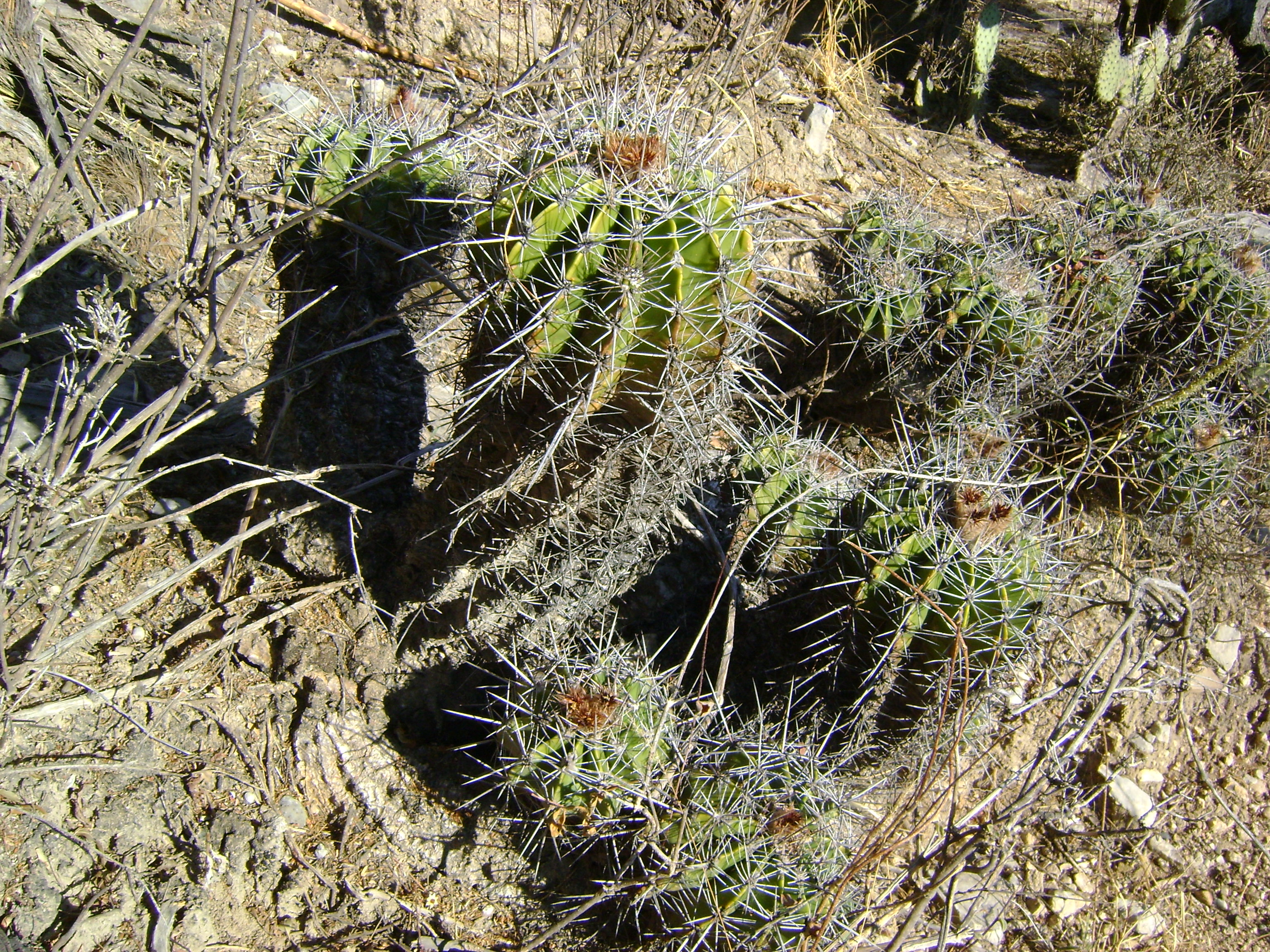
Plant in Zapotitlan De Las Salinas, Puebla

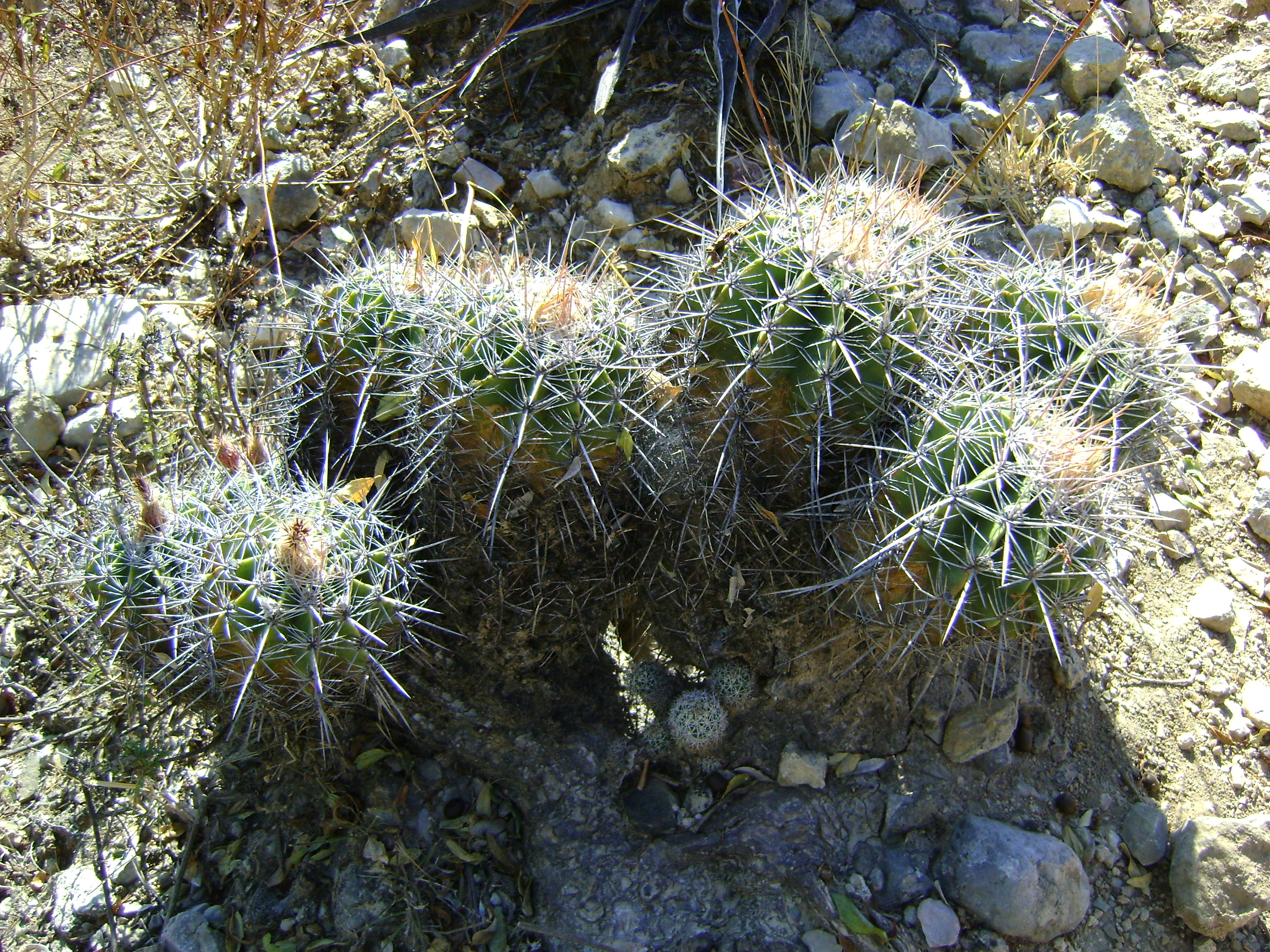

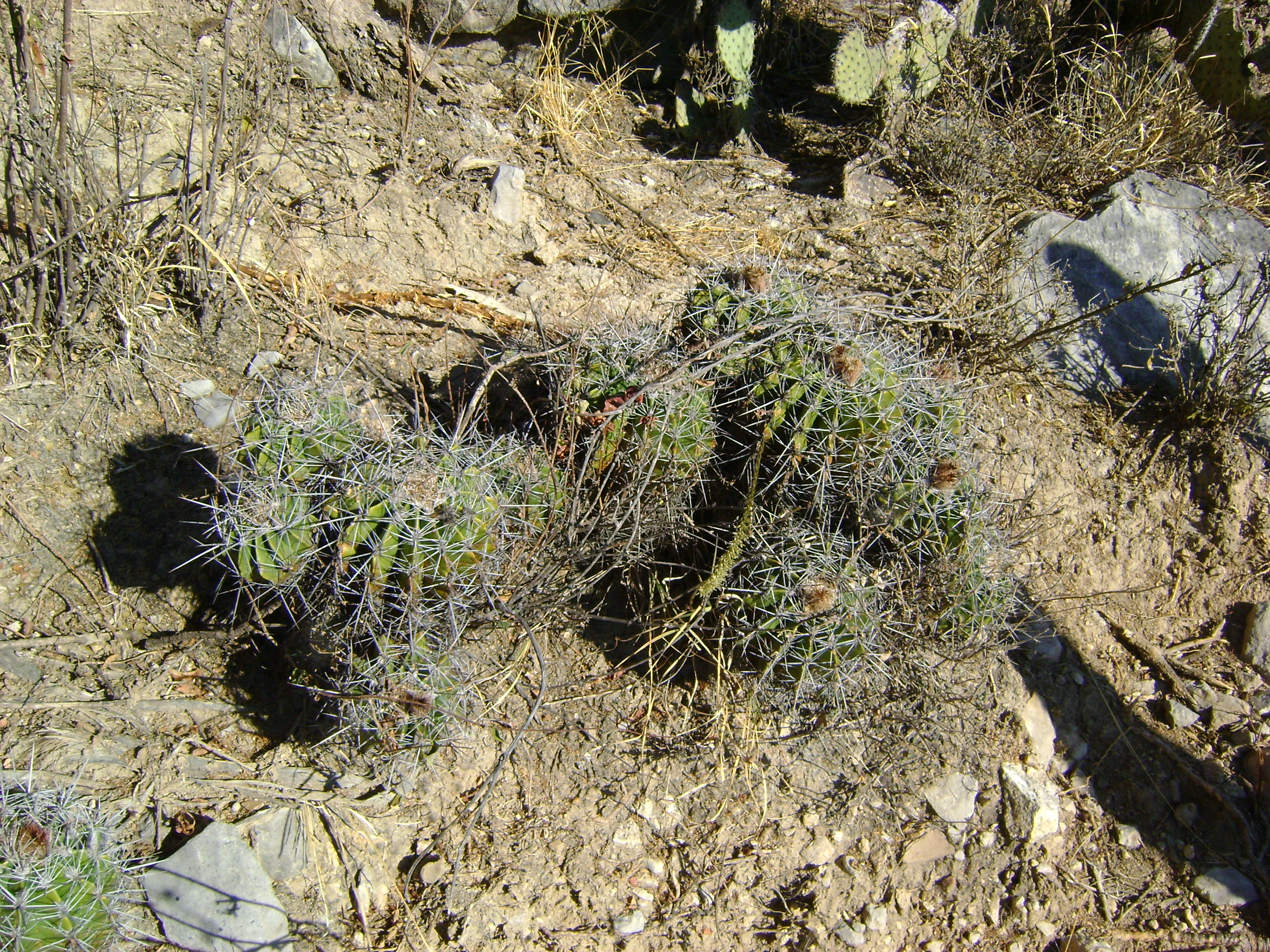

== Taxonomy ==
The species was first described as Echinocactus flavovirens in 1841 by Michael Joseph François Scheidweiler. The specific epithet flavovirens comes from the Latin words for "yellow" and "greening," referring to the color of the shoots. In 1922, Nathaniel Lord Britton and Joseph Nelson Rose reclassified it into the genus Ferocactus.
