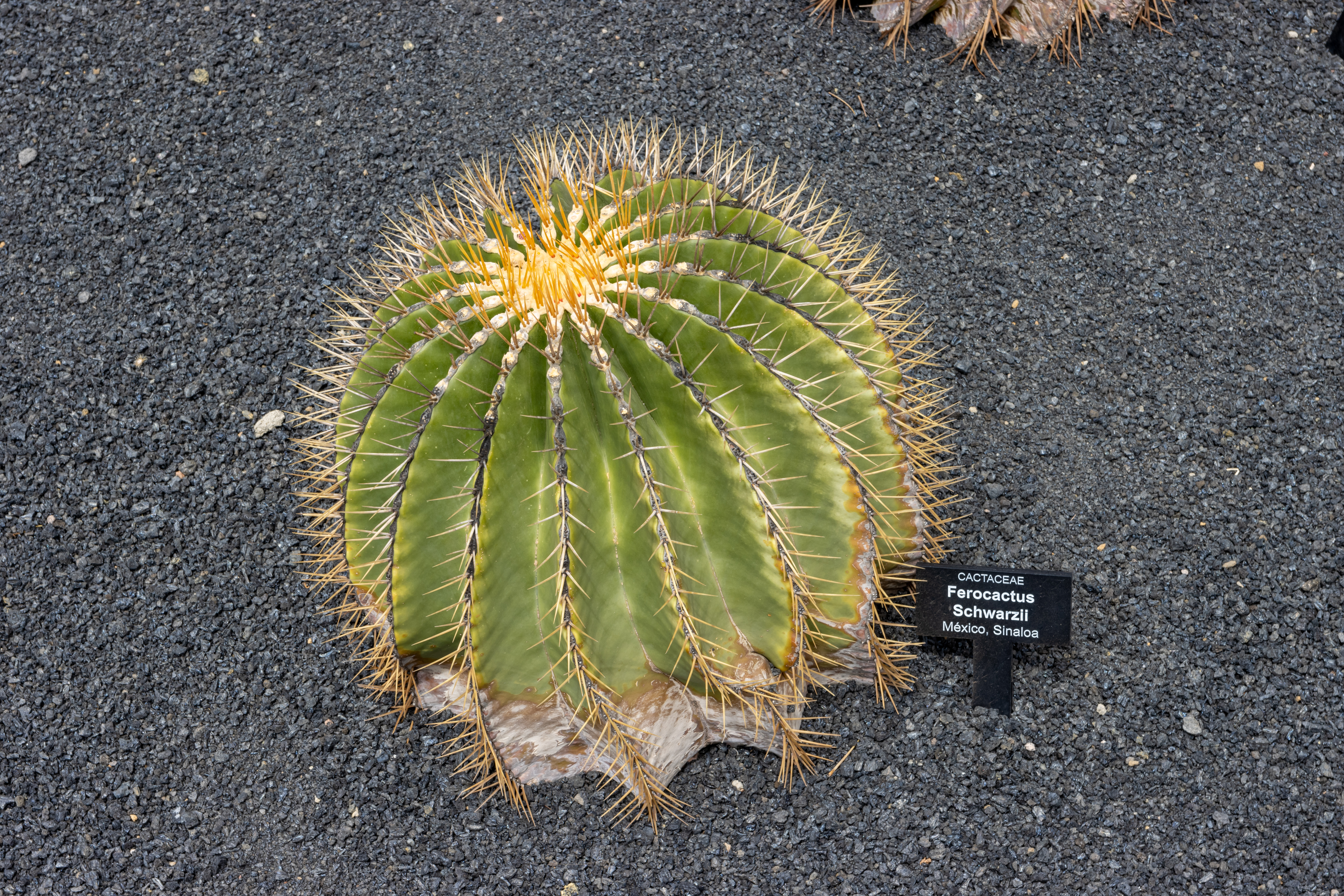

Conservation status
- Data Deficient (IUCN 3.1)

Scientific classification
- Kingdom: Plantae
- Clade: Tracheophytes
- Clade: Angiosperms
- Clade: Eudicots
- Order: Caryophyllales
- Family: Cactaceae
- Subfamily: Cactoideae
- Genus: Ferocactus
- Species: F. schwarzii

Binomial name
- Ferocactus schwarzii G.E. Linds. 1955

Synonyms
- Parrycactus schwarzii (G.E.Linds.) Doweld 2000

= Ferocactus schwarzii =

Species of cactus

Ferocactus schwarzii is a species of Ferocactus from Mexico.

== Description ==
Ferocactus schwarzii is a solitary cactus with globular or ellipsoidal light green shoots, growing up to 80 cm (31 in) tall and 50 cm (20 in) in diameter. It has 13 to 19 initially rounded, sharp-edged ribs. The one to five yellow spines, slightly curved backward and protruding, turn gray with age and range from 0.5 to 5.5 cm (0.20 to 2.17 in) in length.

The yellow flowers, which do not fully open, form a ring around the crown, reaching up to 5 cm (2.0 in) in length and 4 cm (1.6 in) in diameter. The approximately spherical fruits are green-olive, measuring 1.3 to 2 cm (0.51 to 0.79 in) in length, and eventually dry out and split lengthwise.

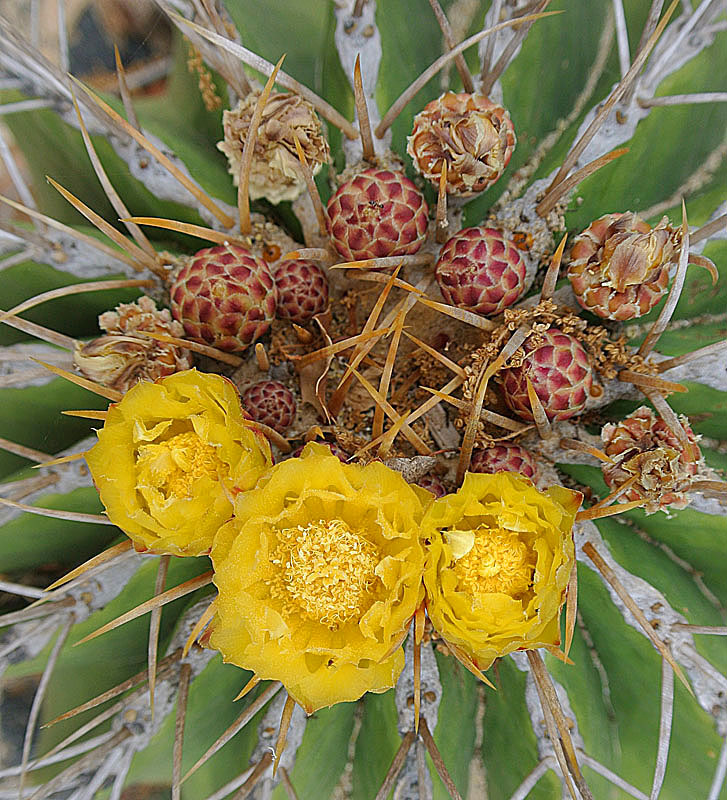
Flowers

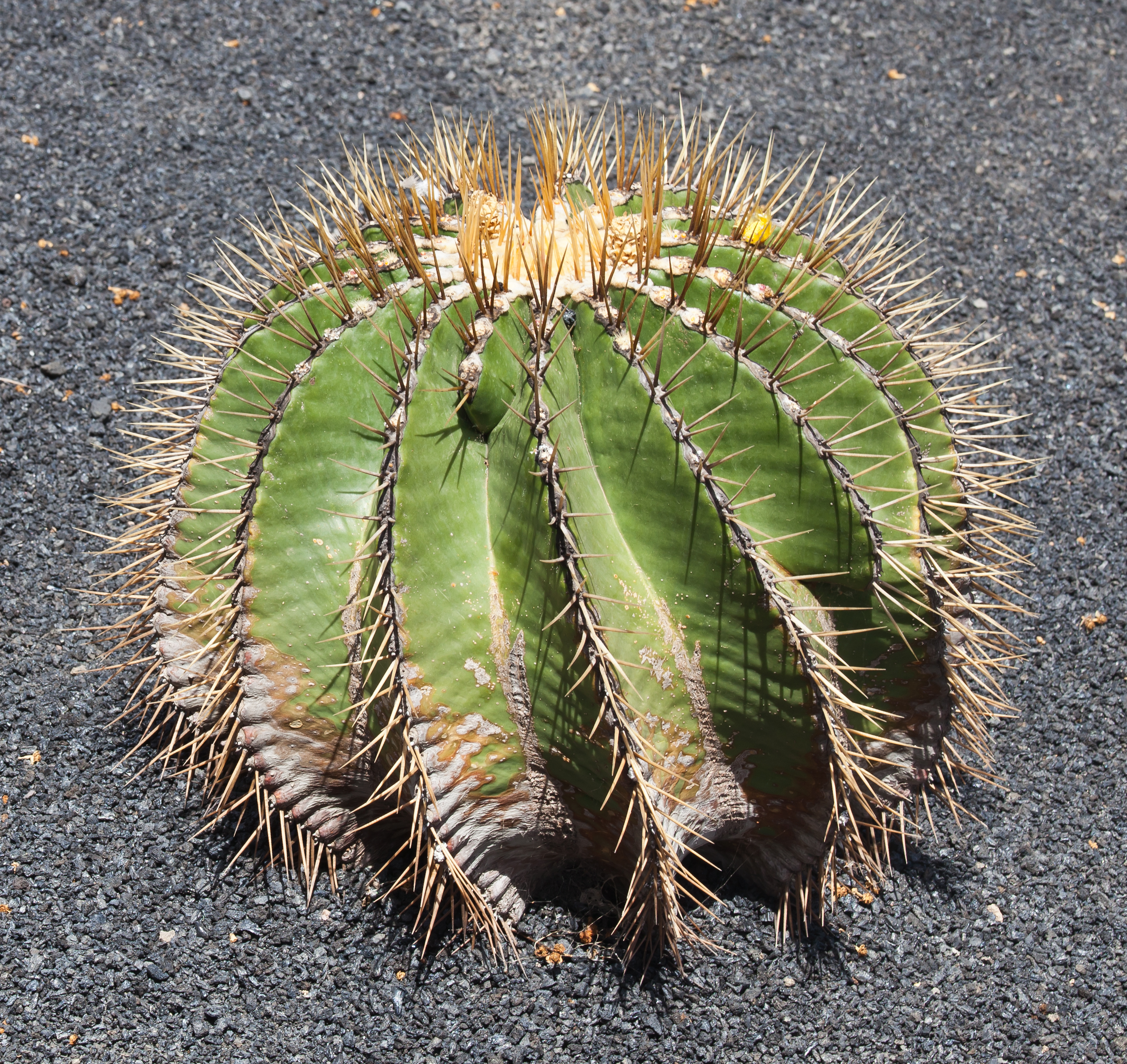
Plant

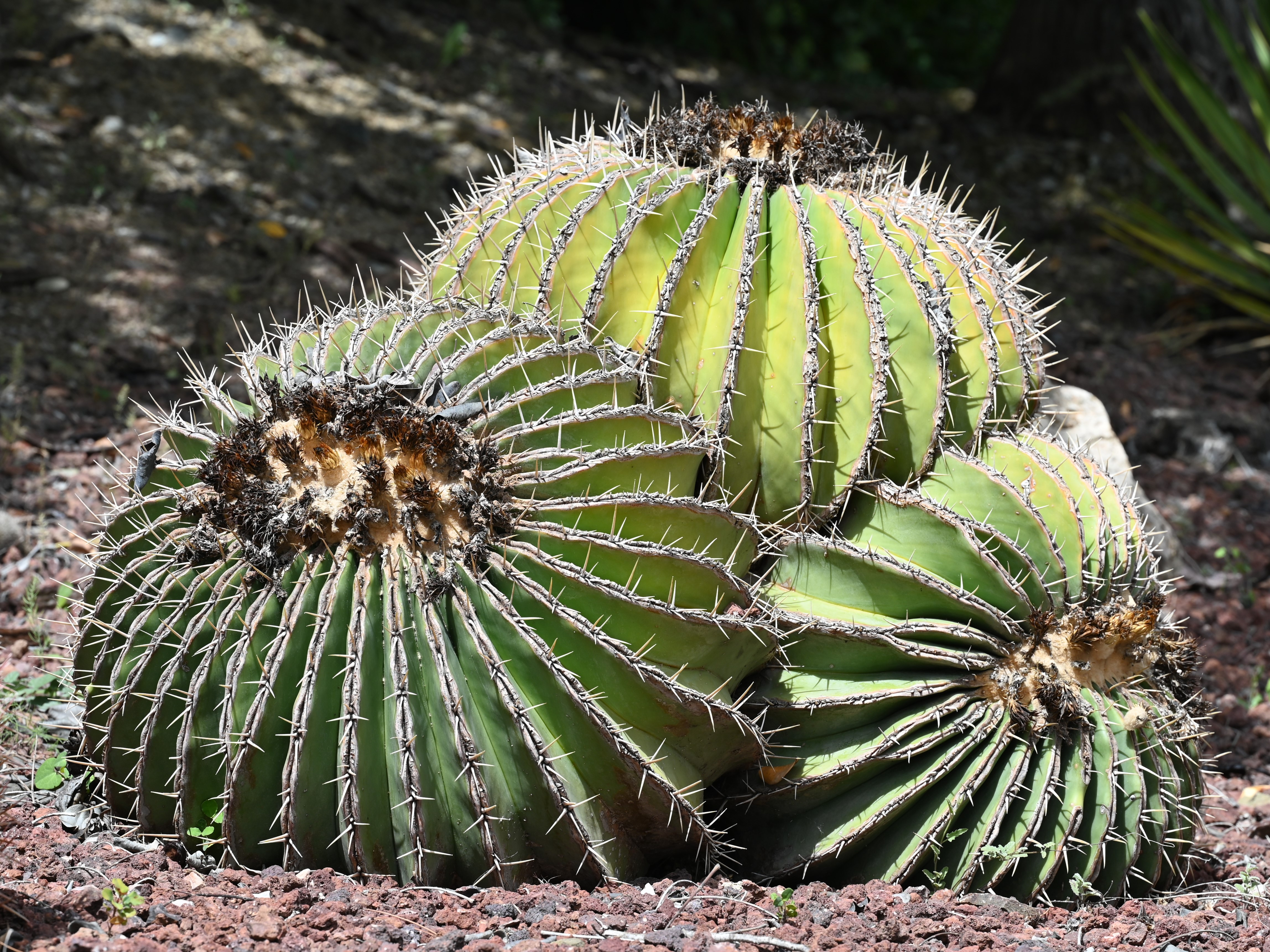
Adult plant in Jardín Botánico La Concepción

== Distribution ==
Ferocactus schwarzii is commonly found in Sinaloa, Mexico and occurs between elevations between 30 and 200 meters. The IUCN Red List classifies this species as "Data Deficient" (DD).

== Taxonomy ==
George Edmund Lindsay first described Ferocactus schwarzii in 1955. The specific epithet "schwarzii" is in honor of Fritz Schwarz, a cactus collector who worked in Mexico.
