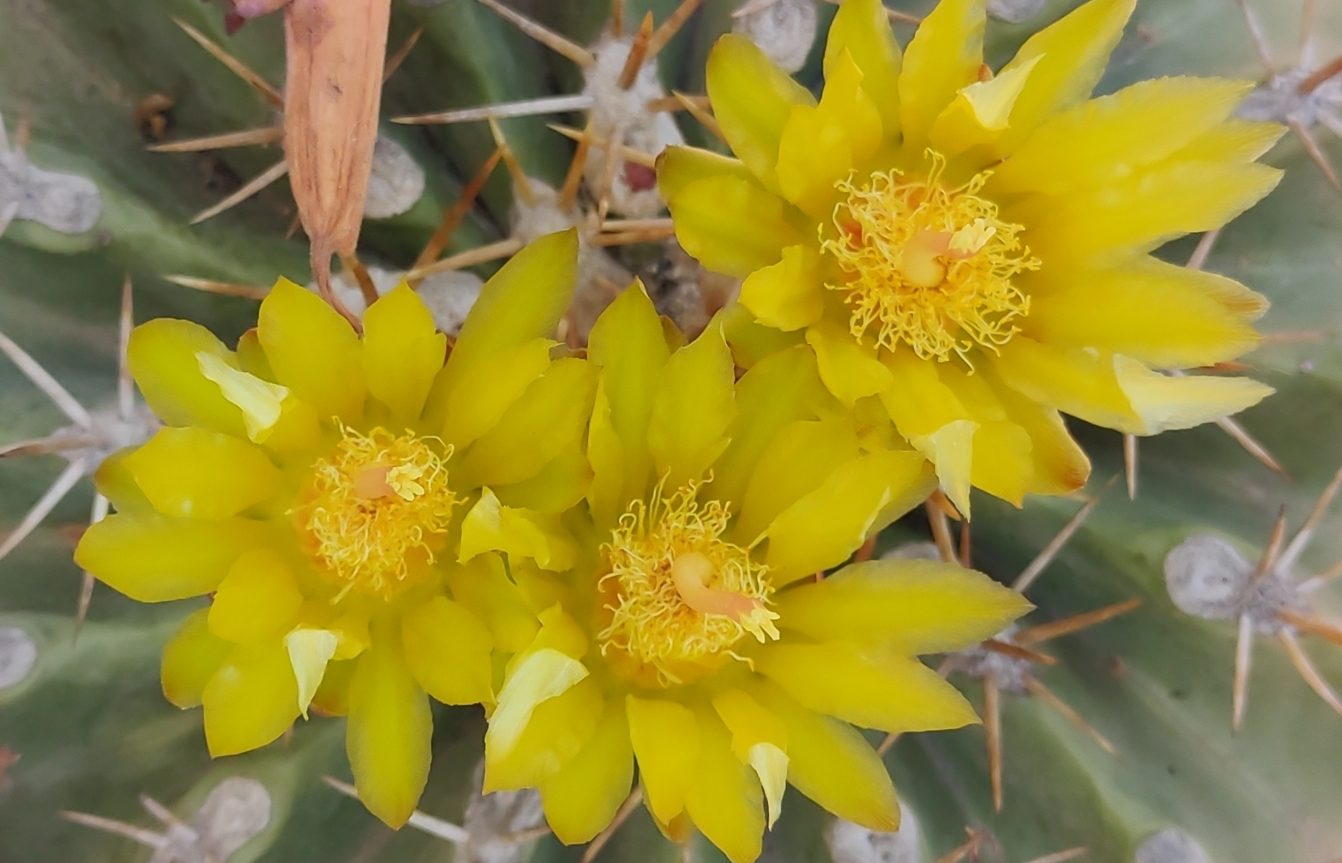

Conservation status
- Near Threatened (IUCN 3.1)

Scientific classification
- Kingdom: Plantae
- Clade: Embryophytes
- Clade: Tracheophytes
- Clade: Spermatophytes
- Clade: Angiosperms
- Clade: Eudicots
- Order: Caryophyllales
- Family: Cactaceae
- Subfamily: Cactoideae
- Genus: Ferocactus
- Species: F. alamosanus

Binomial name
- Ferocactus alamosanus (Britton & Rose) Britton & Rose 1922

Synonyms
- Echinocactus alamosanus Britton & Rose 1913; Ferocactus pottsii var. alamosanus (Britton & Rose) G.Unger 1971; Parrycactus alamosanus (Britton & Rose) Doweld 2000

= Ferocactus alamosanus =

Species of cactus

Ferocactus alamosanus is a species of Ferocactus from Mexico.

== Description ==
Ferocactus alamosanus is a solitary plant that grows in a spherical to short columnar shape, reaching up to 30 cm (12 in) in diameter and 1 meter in height. It has 12 to 20 narrow ribs with sharp or blunt edges. The yellow needle-like spines include a single central spine up to 6 cm (2.4 in) long and eight radial spines measuring 3 to 4 cm (1.2 to 1.6 in) in length.

The flowers of Ferocactus alamosanus are funnel-shaped and greenish yellow, with a length of up to 4.5 cm (1.8 in) and a diameter of 3.5 cm (1.4 in). Its egg-shaped fruits are yellow, up to 4 cm (1.6 in) long, and open with a basal pore.

=== Subspecies ===
Accepted subspecies:

Image	Subspecies	Distribution
	Ferocactus alamosanus subsp. alamosanus	Mexico (Sonora, Chihuahua, Durango)
	Ferocactus alamosanus subsp. reppenhagenii (G.Unger) N.P.Taylor	SW. Mexico

== Distribution ==
This species is found in the Mexican states of Sonora, Michoacán, Oaxaca, and Colima in deciduous and oak forest at elevations of 450–1300 meters.

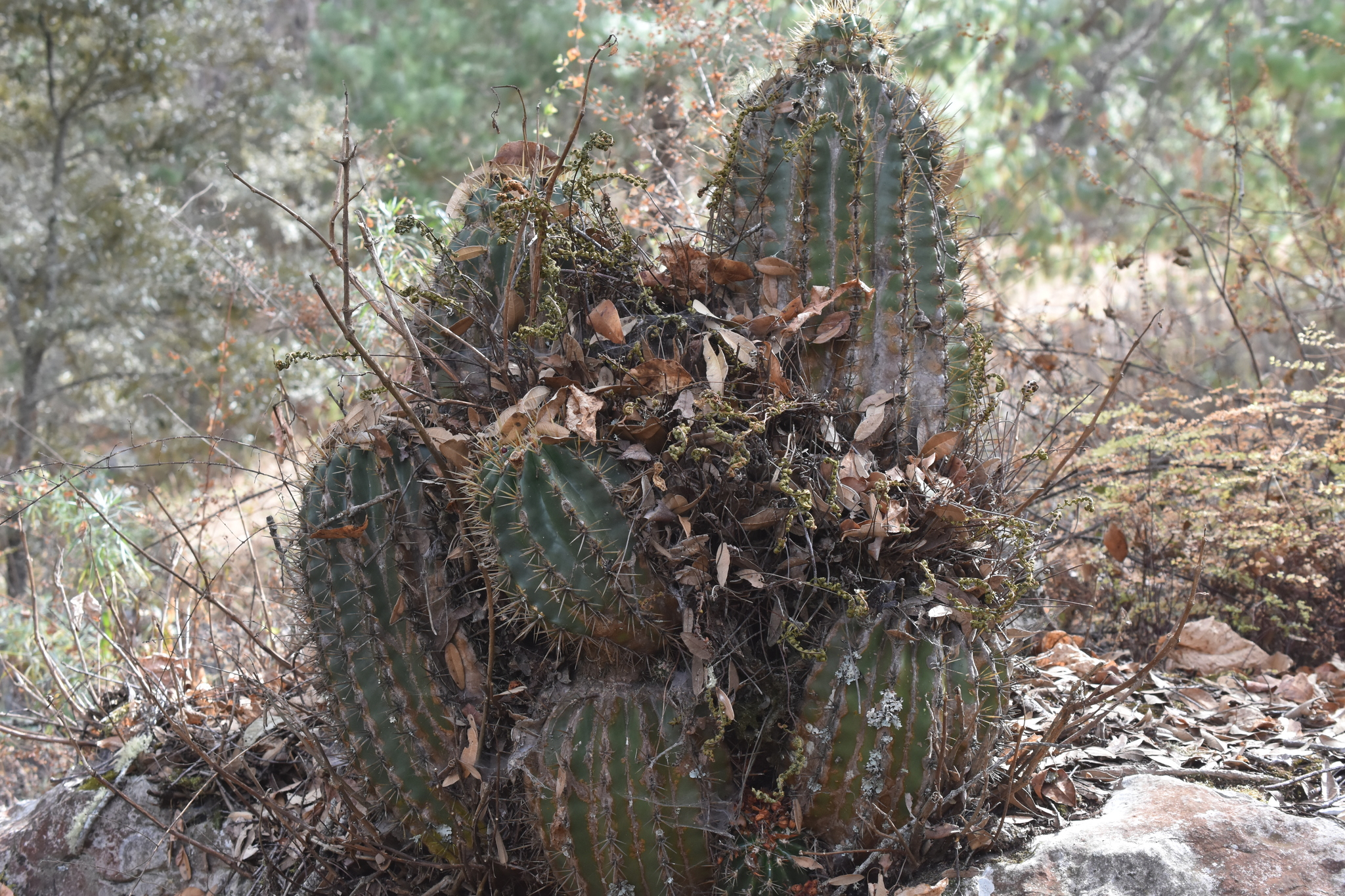
Ferocactus alamosanus subsp. reppenhagenii in habitat near El Sauz, Colima, Mexico

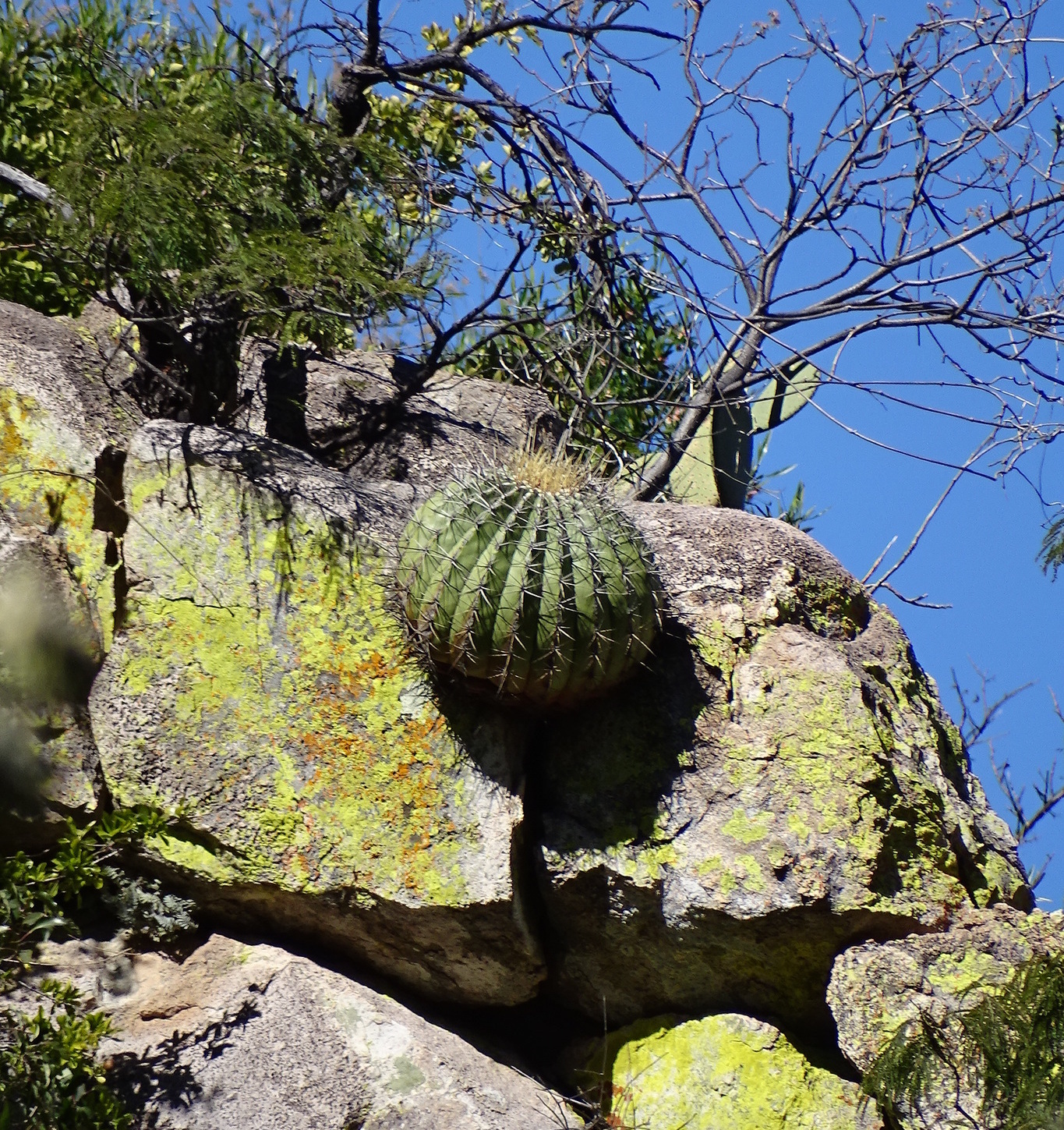
Ferocactus alamosanus subsp. alamosanus in Piedras Blancas, Sonora, Mexico

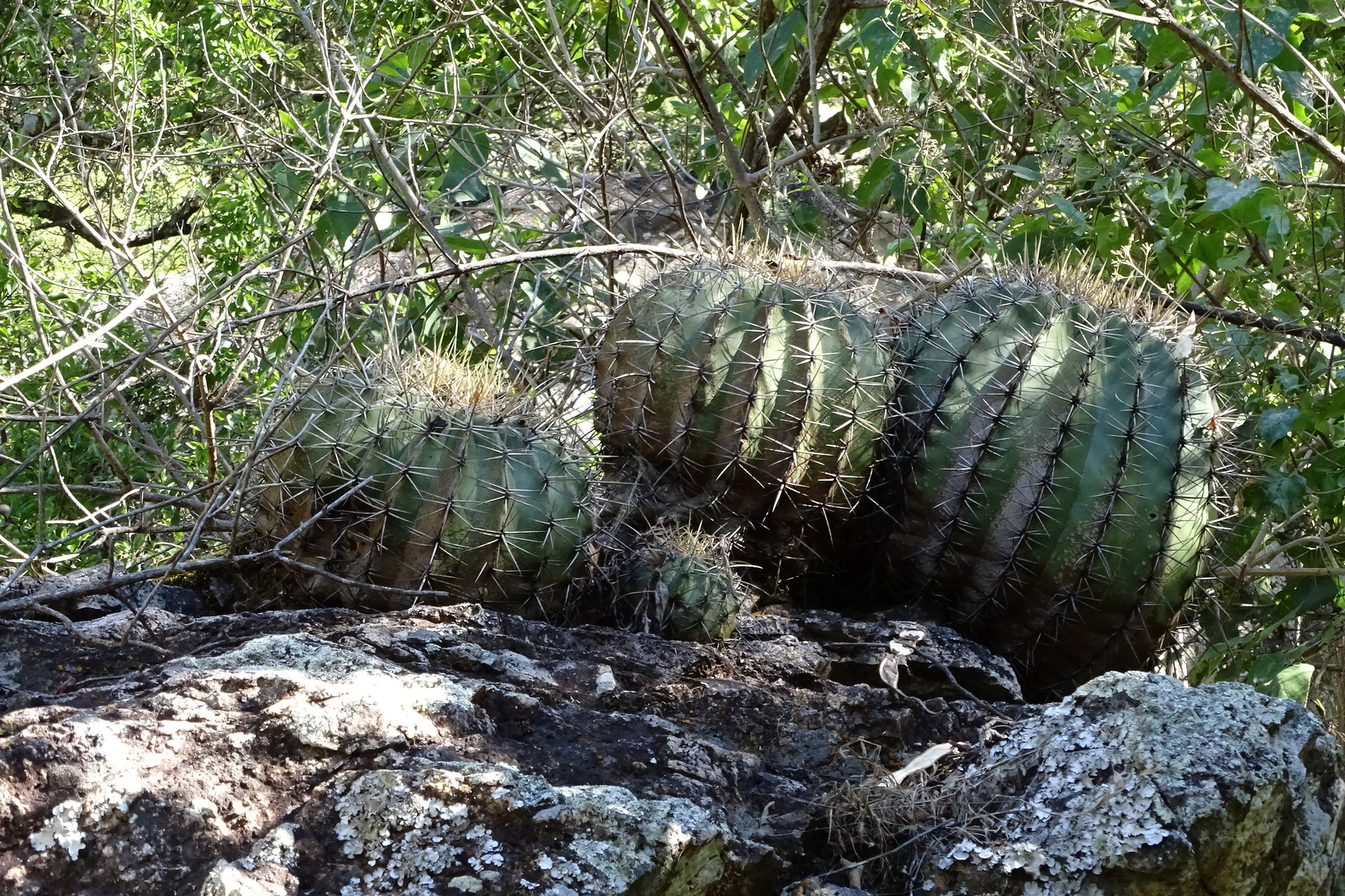
Ferocactus alamosanus subsp. alamosanus habitat in Barrio, Sonora, Mexico

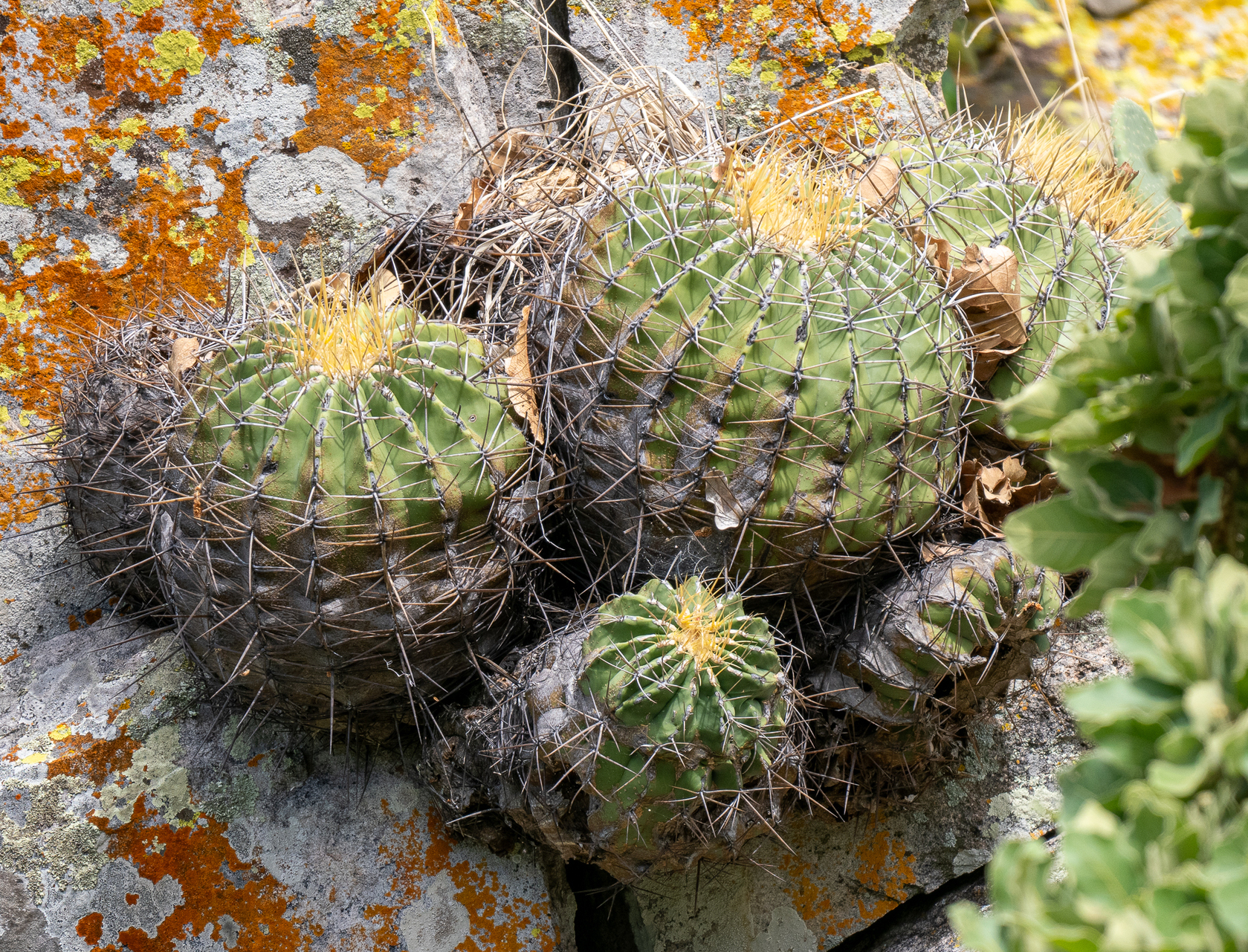
Ferocactus alamosanus subsp. alamosanus habitat in Rancherías, Sonora, Mexico

== Taxonomy ==
First described as Echinocactus alamosanus in 1913 by Nathaniel Lord Britton and Joseph Nelson Rose. The specific epithet, alamosanus, refers to the plant's occurrence at Álamos in the Mexican state of Sonora, in northwestern Mexico. Ferocactus alamosanus was later placed in the newly created genus Ferocactus by the same authors in 1922.
