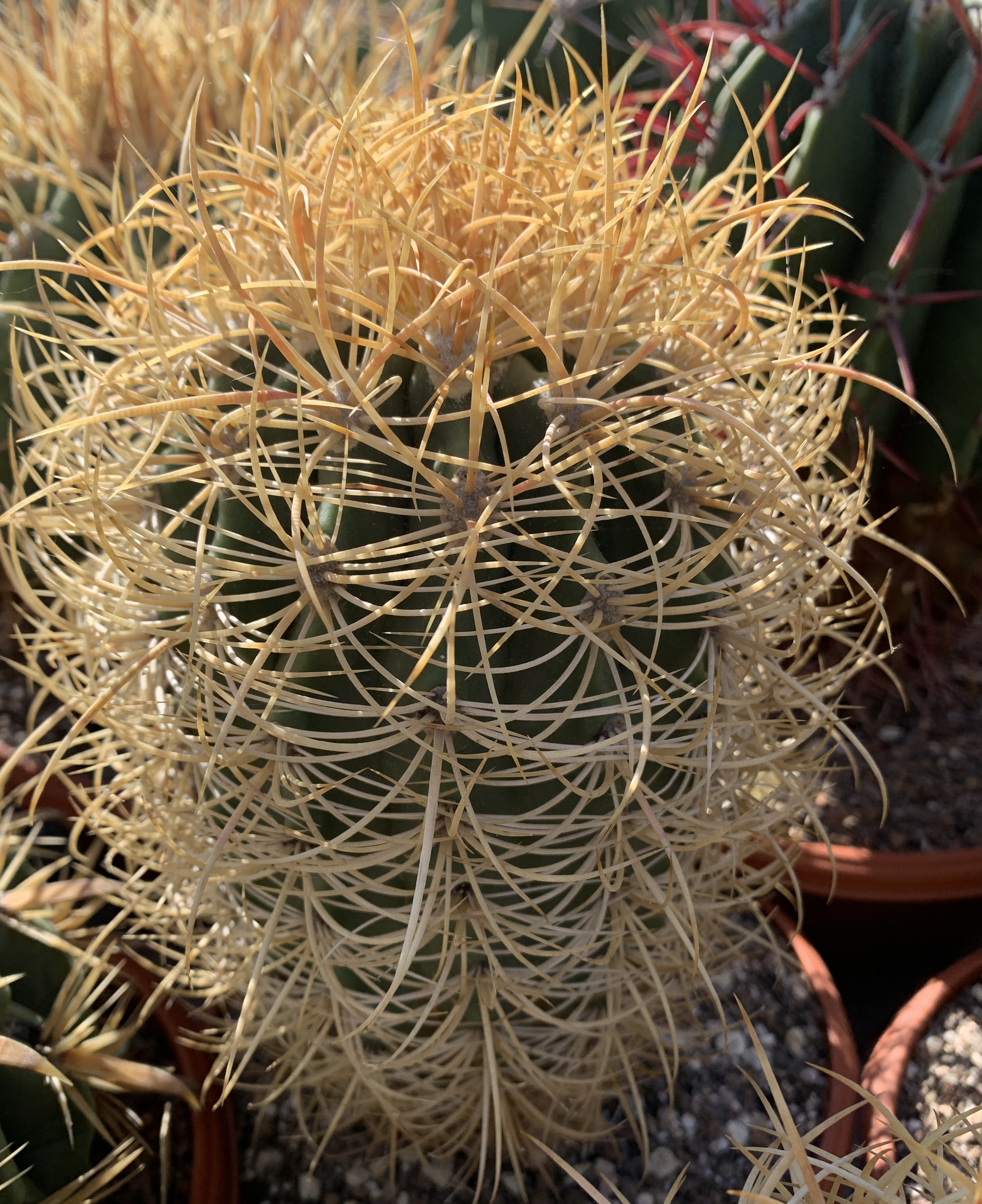

Conservation status
- Least Concern (IUCN 3.1)

Scientific classification
- Kingdom: Plantae
- Clade: Embryophytes
- Clade: Tracheophytes
- Clade: Spermatophytes
- Clade: Angiosperms
- Clade: Eudicots
- Order: Caryophyllales
- Family: Cactaceae
- Subfamily: Cactoideae
- Genus: Ferocactus
- Species: F. johnstonianus

Binomial name
- Ferocactus johnstonianus Britton & Rose 1923

Synonyms
- Echinocactus johnstonianus (Britton & Rose) Fosberg 1942; Ferocactus acanthodes var. johnstonianus (Britton & Rose) G.Unger 1992

= Ferocactus johnstonianus =

Species of cactus

Ferocactus johnstonianus is a species of Ferocactus found in Mexico

== Description ==
Ferocactus johnstonianus is a solitary, spherical to short cylindrical cactus that can grow over 1 meter tall and up to 35 cm (14 in) in diameter. It has 24 to 31 slightly humped ribs and 22 to 25 golden-yellow, awl-shaped spines that turn brown with age and reach up to 6 cm (2.4 in) long, without differentiating into central and radial spines. The cactus produces funnel-shaped yellow flowers that grow up to 5 cm (2.0 in) long and 3.5 cm (1.4 in) in diameter. Its fruits, which are about 3 cm (1.2 in) long, sometimes open with a basal pore.

== Distribution ==
This species is found on Isla Ángel de la Guarda in Baja California, Mexico.

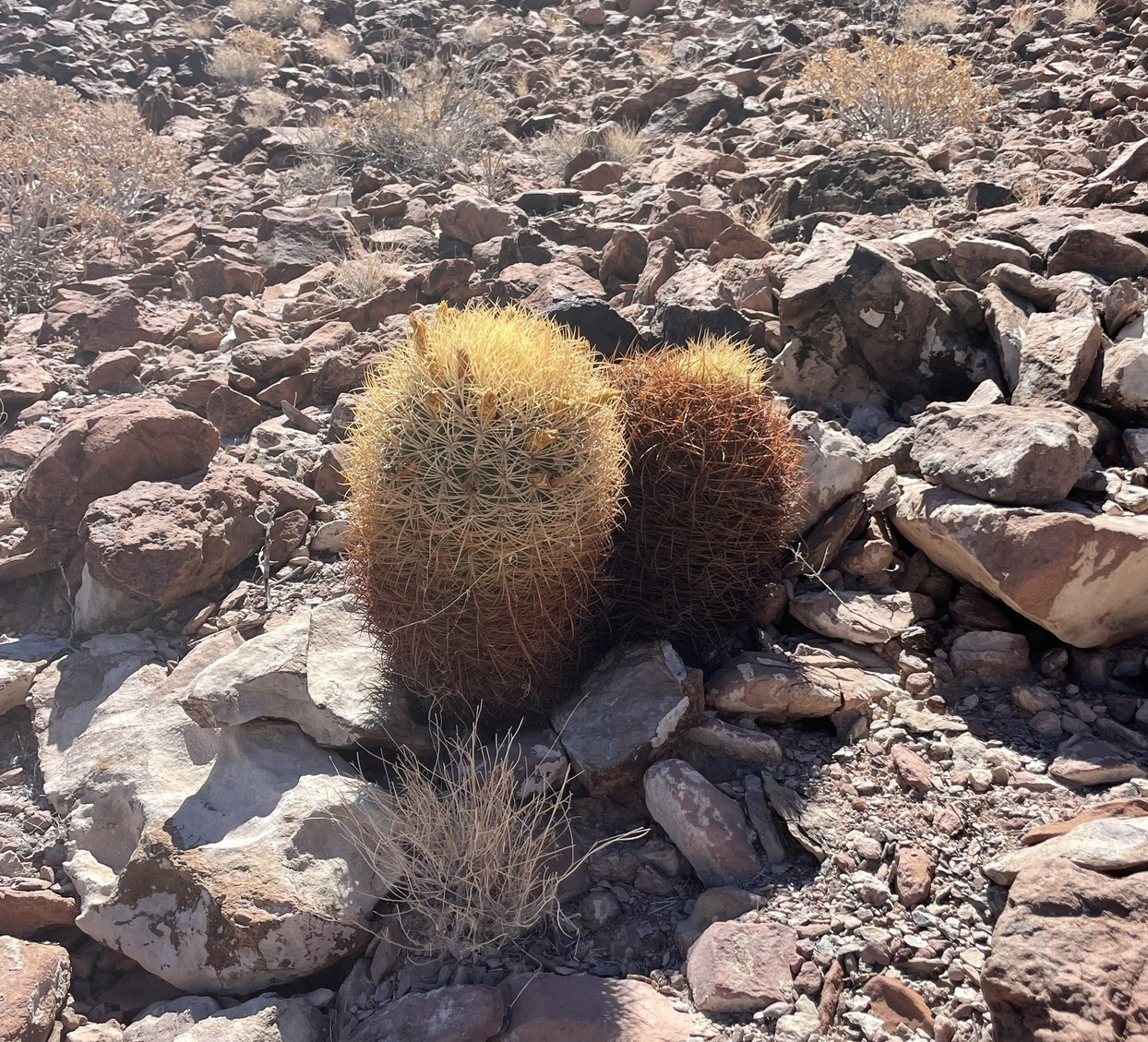
Plant growing in habitat

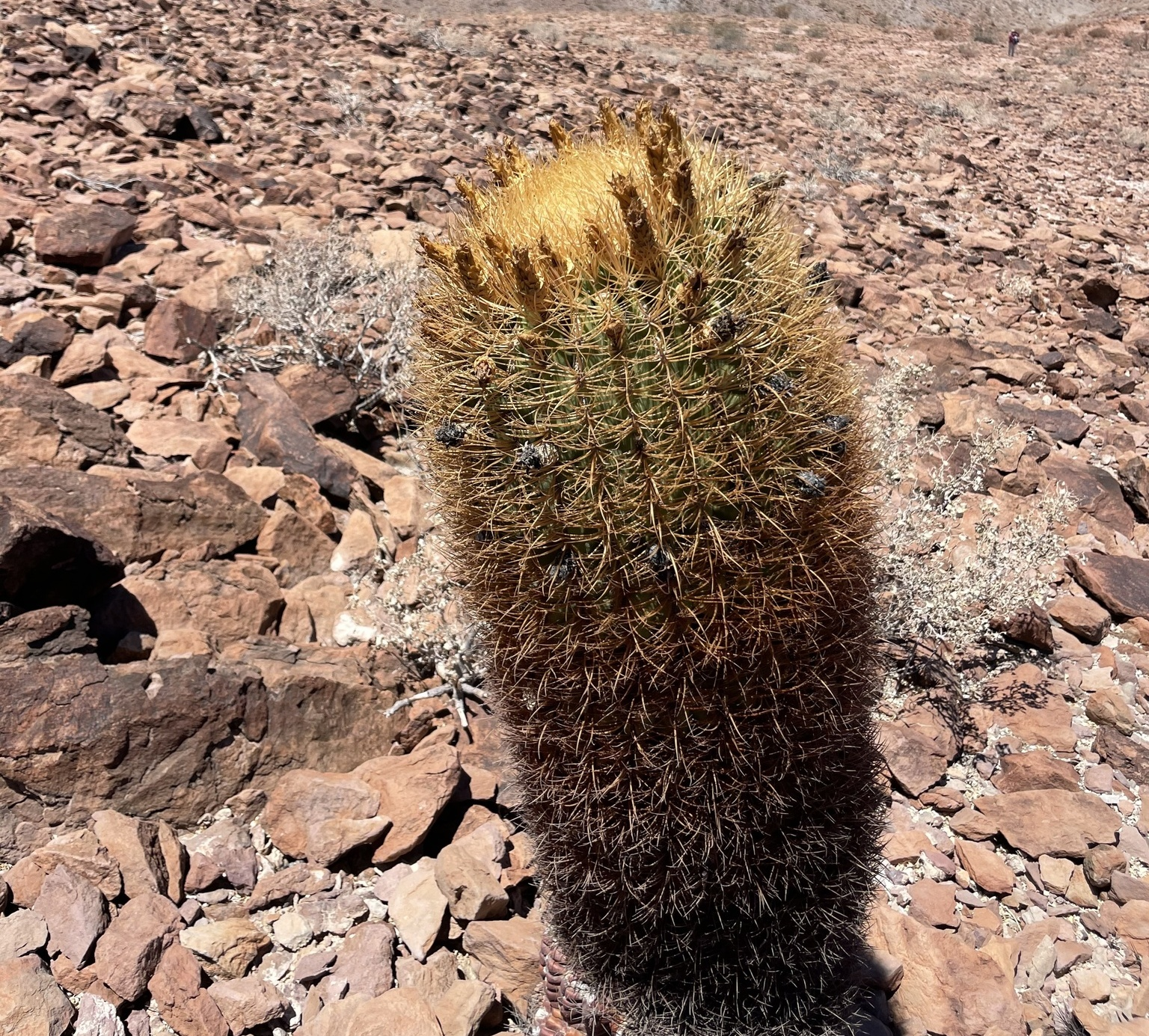
Adult plant fruiting in habitat

== Taxonomy ==
It was first described in 1923 by Nathaniel Lord Britton and Joseph Nelson Rose, and the species name johnstonianus honors American botanist Ivan Murray Johnston.
