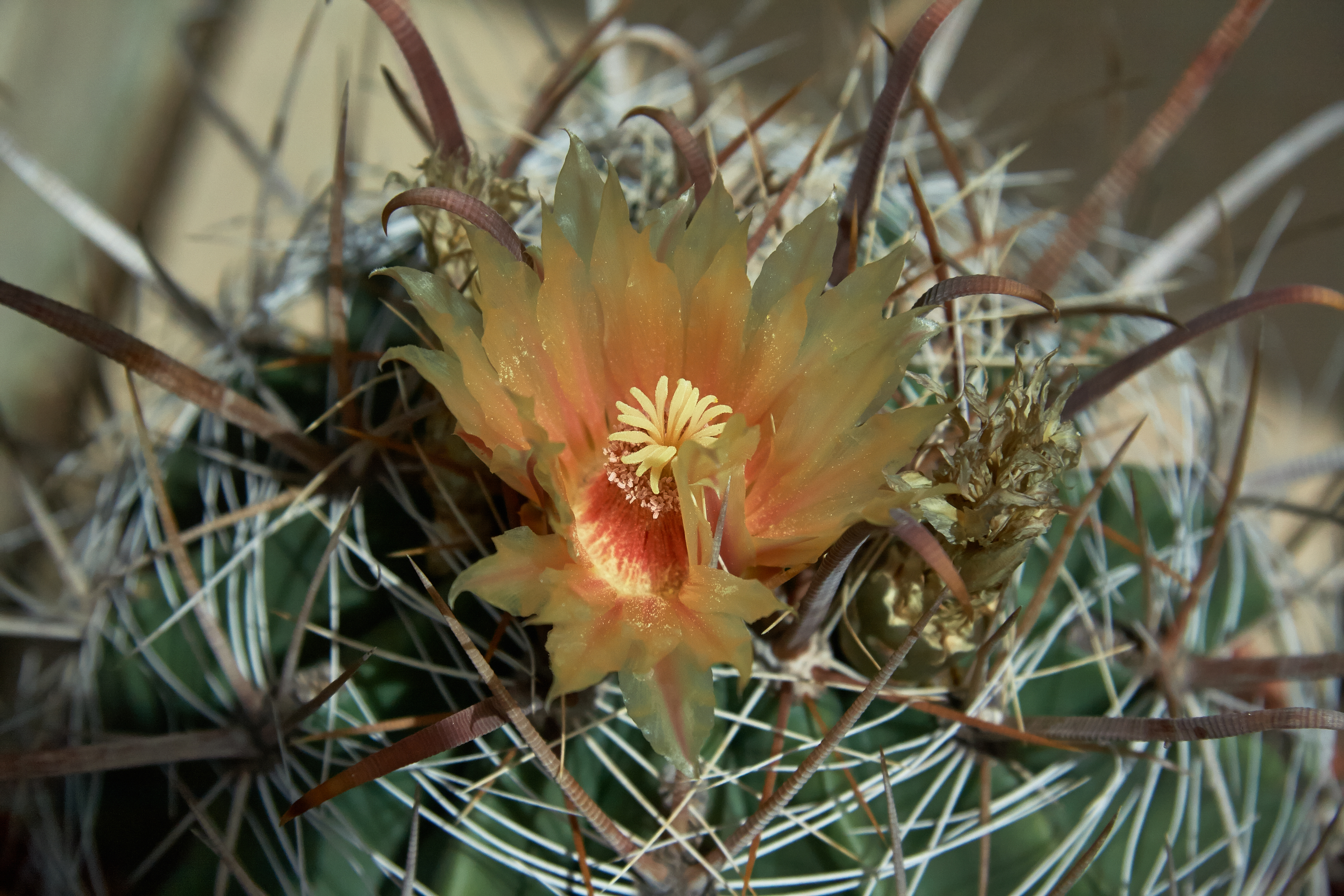

Scientific classification
- Kingdom: Plantae
- Clade: Embryophytes
- Clade: Tracheophytes
- Clade: Angiosperms
- Clade: Eudicots
- Order: Caryophyllales
- Family: Cactaceae
- Subfamily: Cactoideae
- Genus: Ferocactus
- Species: F. santa-maria

Binomial name
- Ferocactus santa-maria Britton & Rose 1913

Synonyms
- Ferocactus peninsulae var. santa-maria (Britton & Rose) N.P.Taylor 1984; Ferocactus peninsulae subsp. santa-maria (Britton & Rose) Pilbeam & Bowdery 2005; Ferocactus townsendianus var. santa-maria (Britton & Rose) G.E.Linds. 1955; Echinocactus santa-maria Rose ex Schick 1919

= Ferocactus santa-maria =

Species of cactus

Ferocactus santa-maria is a species of Ferocactus from the island of Magdalena, in Baja Califonria Sur, Mexico.

== Description ==
Ferocactus santa-maria is a solitary cactus with cylindrical stems, growing up to 70 cm (28 in) tall and 25 cm (9.8 in) in diameter. It features approximately 13 rounded, straight ribs. The four central spines are gray, ridged, and generally straight, reaching lengths of up to 4.5 cm (1.8 in), with the lowest spine being the longest and slightly curved towards the tip. The cactus also has about 15 spreading radial spines that are lighter in color, with the upper ones being bristle-like and some lower ones resembling the central spines. This species produces funnel-shaped, yellow flowers that are up to 6 cm (2.4 in) long and 7 cm (2.8 in) in diameter. Its yellow fruits are fleshy, up to 5 cm (2.0 in) long, and reach 3.5 cm (1.4 in) in diameter.

== Distribution ==
Ferocactus santa-maria is native to the island of Magdalena in the Mexican state of Baja California Sur.

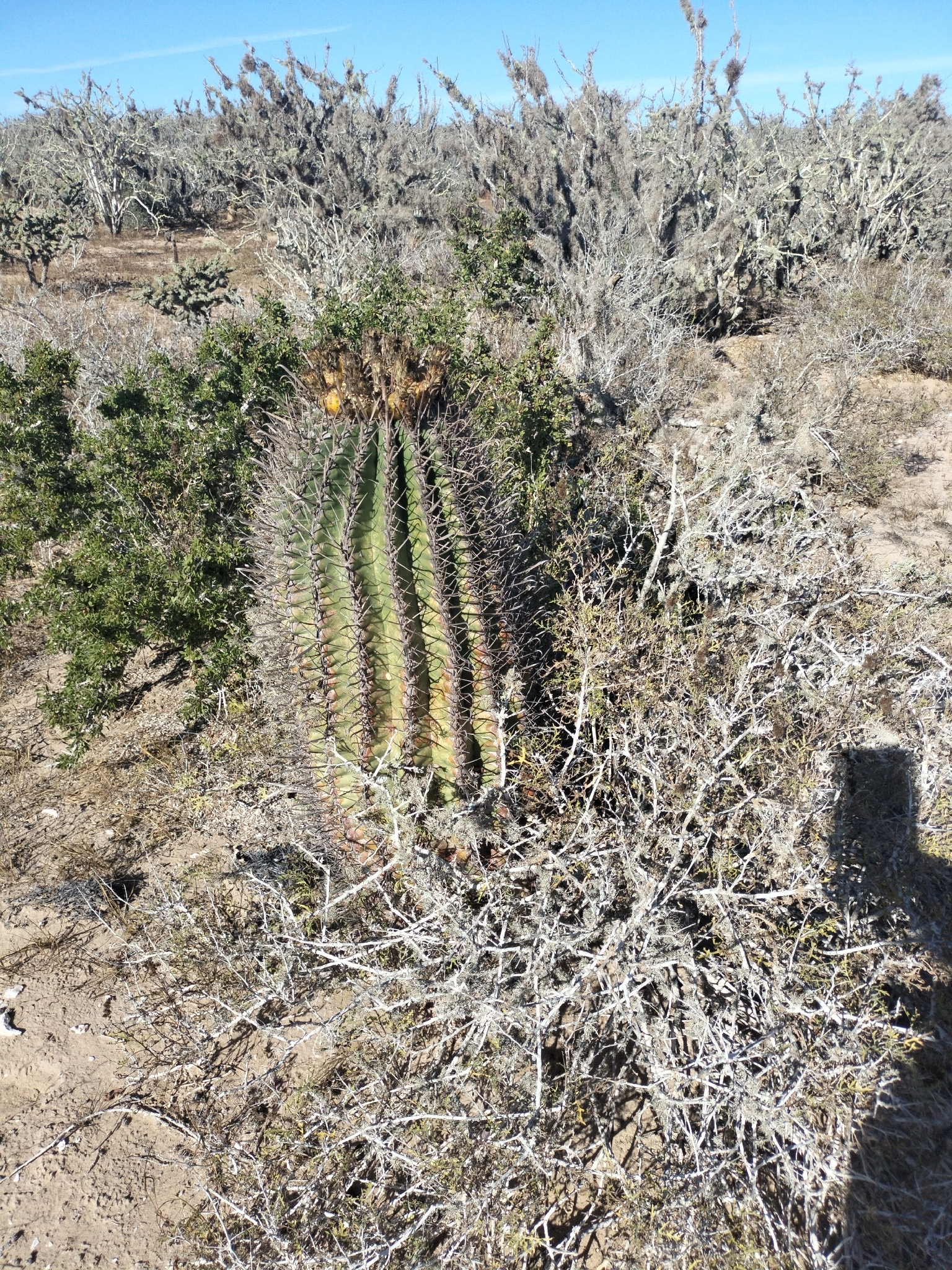
Habitat in Las Tinajas, Baja California Sur, Mexico

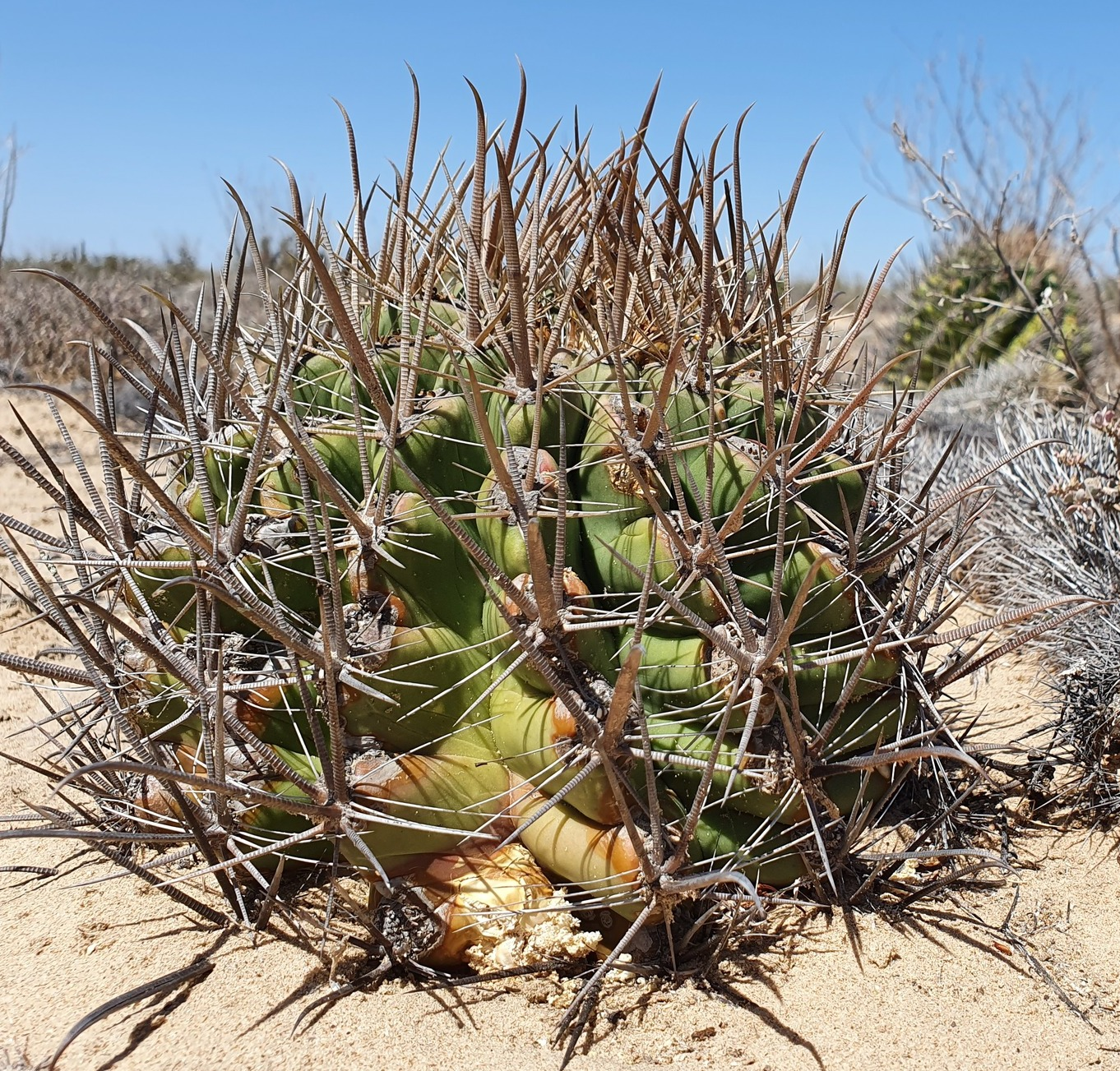
Plant growing in San Carlos, Baja California Sur, Mexico

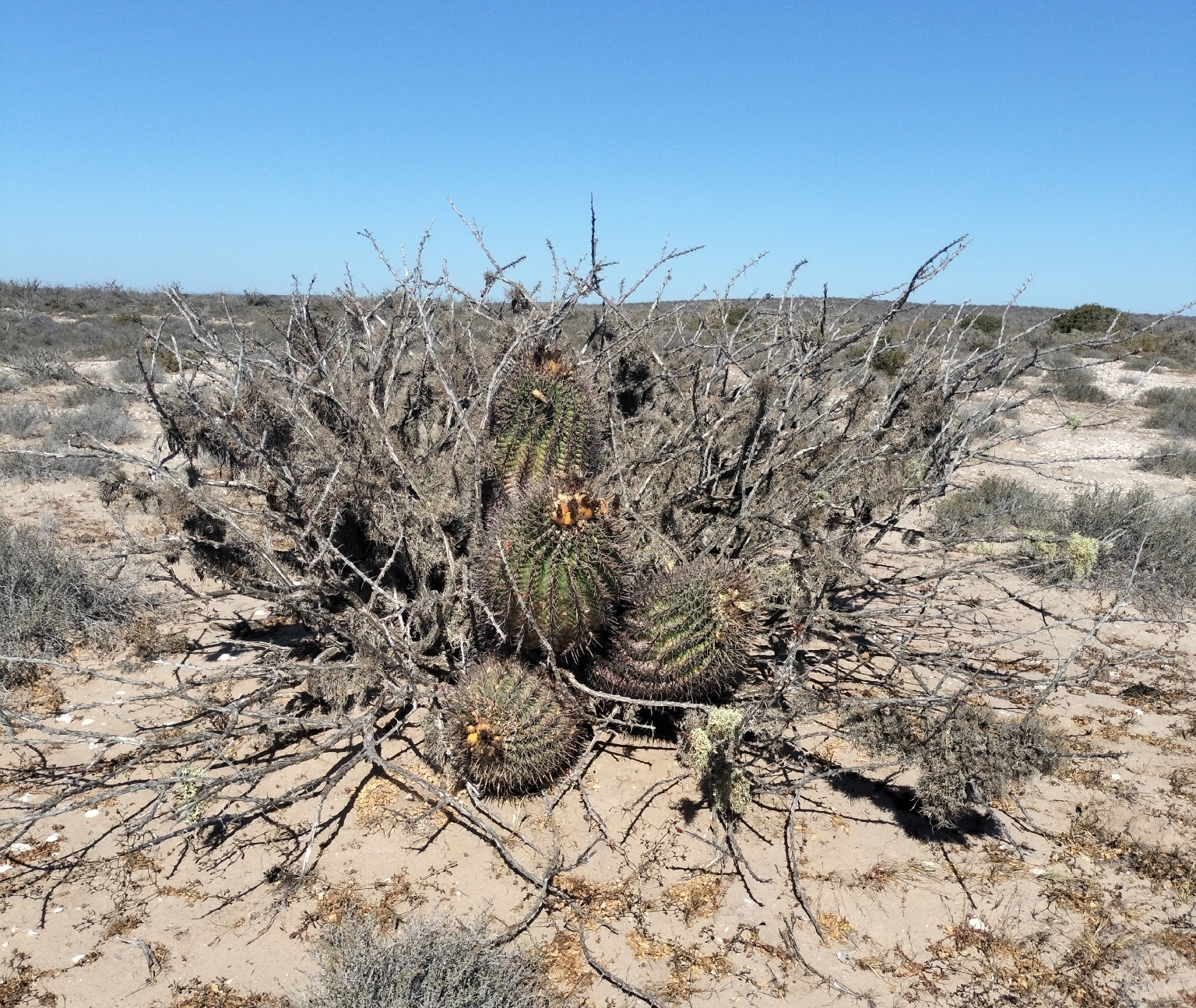
Habitat in La Poza Grande, Baja California Sur, Mexico

== Taxonomy ==
It was first described in 1922 by Nathaniel Lord Britton and Joseph Nelson Rose, based on a specimen collected on May 18, 1913, by J. N. Rose on the shore of Santa Maria Bay.
