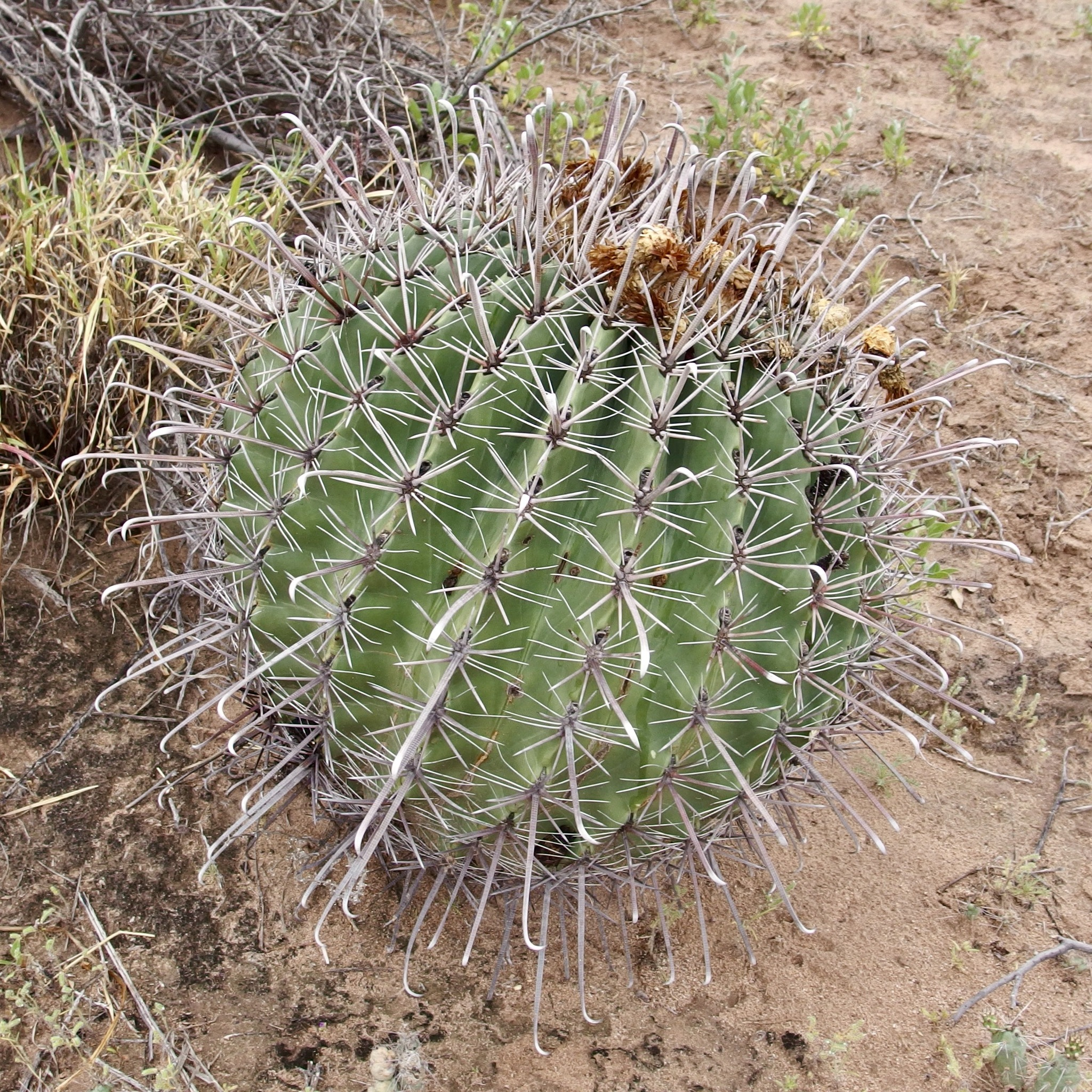

Conservation status
- Vulnerable (IUCN 3.1)

Scientific classification
- Kingdom: Plantae
- Clade: Tracheophytes
- Clade: Angiosperms
- Clade: Eudicots
- Order: Caryophyllales
- Family: Cactaceae
- Subfamily: Cactoideae
- Genus: Ferocactus
- Species: F. tiburonensis

Binomial name
- Ferocactus tiburonensis (G.E.Linds.) Backeb. 1961

Synonyms
- Echinocactus wislizeni subsp. tiburonensis (G.E.Linds.) Felger 1970; Ferocactus wislizeni subsp. tiburonensis (G.E.Linds.) Pilbeam & Bowdery 2005; Ferocactus wislizeni var. tiburonensis G.E.Linds. 1955

= Ferocactus tiburonensis =

Species of cactus

Ferocactus tiburonensis is a species of Ferocactus found in Mexico.

== Description ==
Ferocactus tiburonensis is a solitary cactus, reaching up to 1 meter in height and 35 cm (14 in) in diameter. It has around 21 slightly tuberous ribs and grooved spines that are hard to distinguish between central and peripheral spines. The four straight or twisted central spines, arranged crosswise, can grow up to 9 cm (3.5 in) long, with the lowest occasionally flattened. Its small, non-bristle-like marginal thorns resemble the central thorns.

The plant blooms from April and May. The funnel-shaped, yellow flowers are up to 6 cm (2.4 in) long and 5 cm (2.0 in) in diameter, while the spherical fruits are yellow, fleshy, and 2 to 4 cm (0.79 to 1.57 in) long.

== Distribution ==
The plant is found growing in eastern bajada to Sierra Kunkaak, Tiburón Island and south of Bahía Kino to the vicinity of Tastiota in Sonora, Mexico.

== Taxonomy ==
George Edmund Lindsay first described the plant as Ferocactus wislizeni var. tiburonensis in 1955, with the specific epithet referring to its occurrence on Tiburón Island, Mexico. Curt Backeberg elevated the variety to species rank in 1961.
