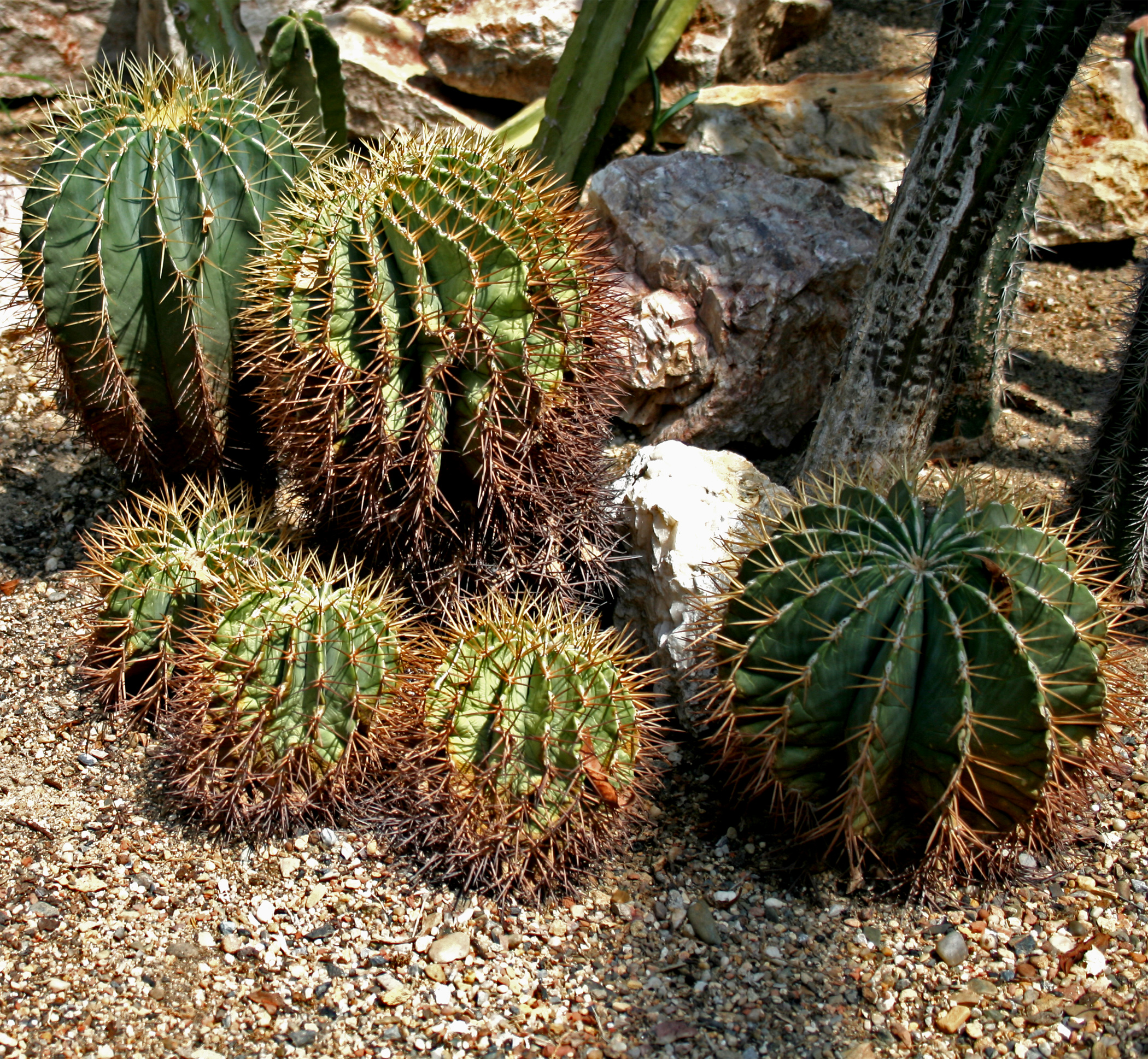
- Ferocactus glaucescens

Scientific classification
- Kingdom: Plantae
- Clade: Tracheophytes
- Clade: Angiosperms
- Clade: Eudicots
- Order: Caryophyllales
- Family: Cactaceae
- Subfamily: Cactoideae
- Tribe: Cacteae
- Genus: Ferocactus; Britton & Rose

Species
- See text.

Synonyms
- Bisnaga Orcutt; Brittonia C.A.Armstr.; Glandulicactus Backeb.; Parrycactus Doweld

= Ferocactus =

Genus of cacti

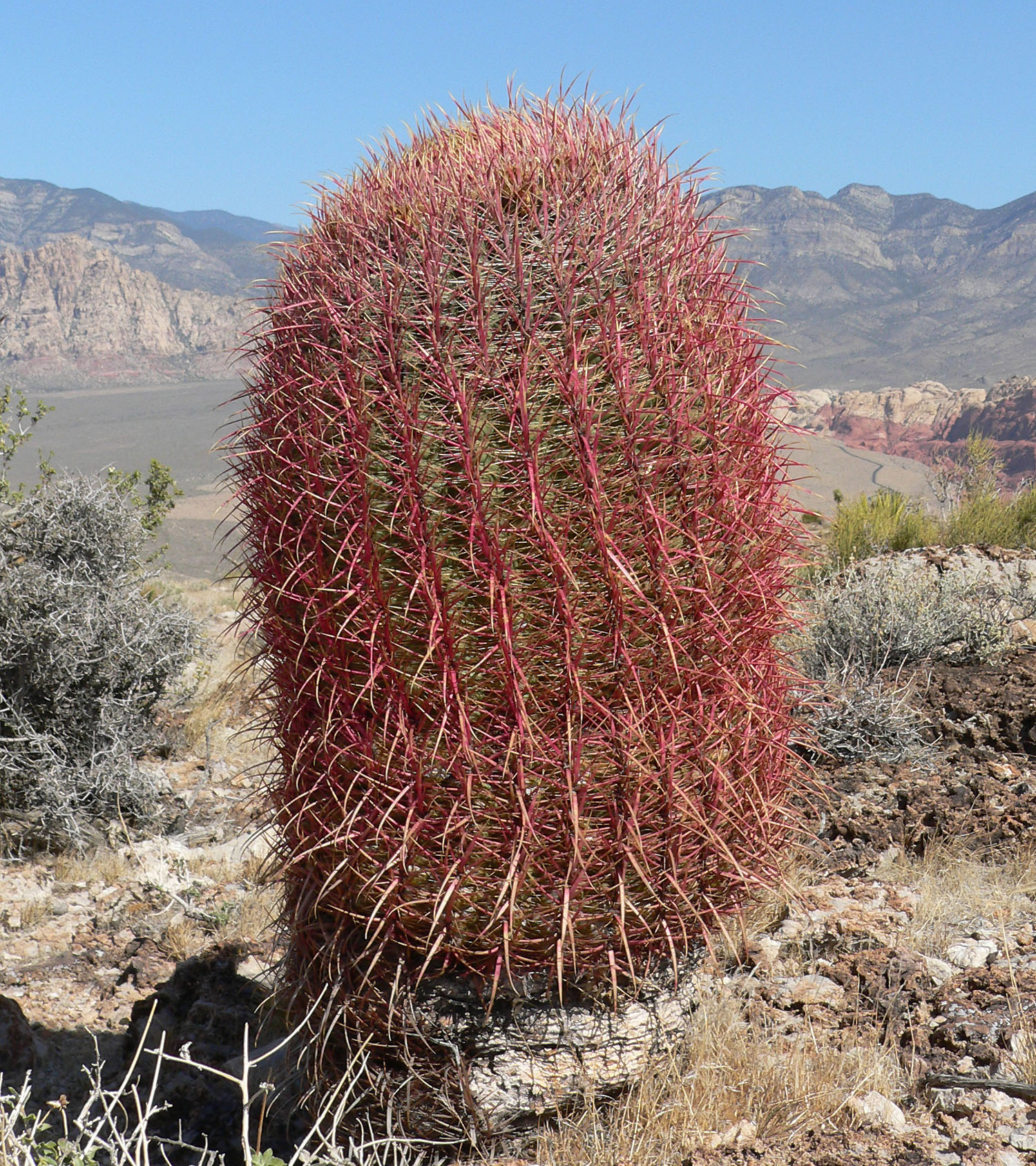
Ferocactus cylindraceus, Red Rock Canyon National Conservation Area, Nevada, USA

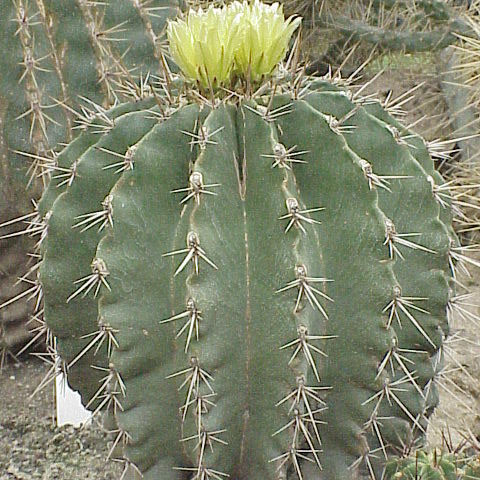
Ferocactus echidne

Ferocactus is a genus of large barrel-shaped cacti, mostly with large spines and small flowers. There are about 30 species included in the genus. They are found in the southwestern United States and northwestern Mexico.

== Description ==
The young specimens are columnar but as they grow older ribs form and they take on a barrel form. Most of the species are solitary but some, such as Ferocactus robustus and F. glaucescens, have clustering habits. The flowers are pink, yellow, red or purple depending on the species, and the petals sometimes have a stripe of a darker colour.

== Habitat ==
They are desert dwellers and can cope with some frost and intense heat. The typical habitat is hot and very arid, and the plants have adapted to exploit water movement to concentrate their biomass in areas where water is likely to be present. Like Sclerocactus, Ferocactus typically grow in areas where water flows irregularly or depressions where water can accumulate for short periods of time. They are most often found growing along arroyos (washes) where their seeds have been subjected to scarification due to water movement, but they oddly also tend to grow along ridges in spots where depressions have formed and can hold water for some period of time.

== Adaptations ==
Ferocactus have very shallow root systems and are easily uprooted during flash floods. The "fishhook" spines and the armored web of spines enclosing the cactus body in many species of this genus are adaptations which allow the plant to move to more favorable locations. The seeds germinate in areas where water movement occurs or in areas where standing water accumulates for some period of time, and during flash floods, the hooked spines allow the plants to be caught on waterborne debris, uprooted and carried to areas where water tends to accumulate.

== Cultivation ==
In cultivation Ferocactus require full sun, little water, and good drainage. They are popular as houseplants. They cannot tolerate freezing temperatures for extended periods, which typically cause them to yellow, bleach, then slowly die. Propagation is usually from seeds, but clustering species such as Ferocactus robustus and F. glaucescens can be propagated by removing a rooted offset and planting it.

== Ecology ==
Many Ferocactus species are ant plants, exuding nectar along the upper meristem from extrafloral nectaries above each areole, and hosting ant colonies.

== Species ==
Section	Image	Scientific name	Common name	Distribution
Section Bisnaga		Ferocactus echidne	Sonora Barrel Cactus, Coville's Barrel Cactus, Emory's Barrel Cactus, Traveler's Friend	Mexico
Section Bisnaga		Ferocactus flavovirens		Mexico.
Section Bisnaga		Ferocactus glaucescens		Hidalgo, México.
Section Bisnaga		Ferocactus haematacanthus (Salm-Dyck) Bravo ex Backeb. & F.M.Knuth		Mexico.
Section Bisnaga		Ferocactus hamatacanthus (Muehlenpf.) Britton & Rose	Turk's-Head Barrel Cactus, Biznaga-barril Costillona	Chihuahuan Desert of north-western Mexico, New Mexico, and south-western Texas.
Section Bisnaga		Ferocactus histrix (DC.) G.E.Linds.	Electrode Cactus	Mexico.
Section Bisnaga		Ferocactus latispinus (Haw.) Britton & Rose		southeastern Durango, through Zacatecas, Aguascalientes, east to the western parts of San Luis Potosí, Hidalgo and Puebla, as well as to eastern Jalisco, Guanajuato, Querétaro and Mexico State.
Section Bisnaga		Ferocactus lindsayi		Mexico (Michoacán, Guerrero)
Section Bisnaga		Ferocactus macrodiscus		Mexico.
Section Bisnaga		Ferocactus schwarzii	Schwarz's Barrel Cactus	Mexico.
Section Ferocactus		Ferocactus alamosanus		Mexican state of Sonora, in northwestern Mexico
Section Ferocactus		Ferocactus chrysacanthus		Mexico.
Section Ferocactus		Ferocactus cylindraceus (Engelm.) Orcutt	California Barrel Cactus, Biznaga-barril cilíndrica	eastern Mojave Desert and western Sonoran Desert Ecoregions in: Southern California, Nevada, Arizona, and Utah in the Southwestern United States; and Baja California, and Sonora state in Northwestern Mexico.
Section Ferocactus		Ferocactus diguetii		Mexico.
Section Ferocactus		Ferocactus emoryi (Engelm.) Orcutt	Emory's Barrel Cactus, Biznaga-barril de Emory	Mexico (Sonora, Sinaloa and Baja California Sur) and in the United States (Arizona).
Section Ferocactus		Ferocactus fordii		Baja California in Mexico.
Section Ferocactus		Ferocactus gracilis H.E.Gates	Fire Barrel Cactus	Mexico.
Section Ferocactus		Ferocactus herrerae	Twisted Barrel Cactus	Mexico (Sinaloa, Sonora)
Section Ferocactus		Ferocactus johnstonianus Britton & Rose	Johnston's Barrel Cactus	Angel de la Guardia Island, Baja California, Mexico.
Section Ferocactus		Ferocactus peninsulae (F.A.C.Weber) Britton & Rose		Mexican state of Baja California Sur.
Section Ferocactus		Ferocactus pilosus	Mexican Lime Cactus, Viznaga de Lima	Méxican states of Coahuila, Durango, Nuevo Leon, San Luis Potosí, and Tamaulipas
Section Ferocactus		Ferocactus pottsii		Mexico.
Section Ferocactus		Ferocactus robustus		Puebla and Veracruz in Mexico.
Section Ferocactus		Ferocactus santa-maria	Santa-Maria Barrel Cactus	Mexico.
Section Ferocactus		Ferocactus tiburonensis		Mexico (Gulf of California: Tiburon Island)
Section Ferocactus		Ferocactus townsendianus	Townsend Barrel Cactus	Mexico.
Section Ferocactus		Ferocactus viridescens (Torr. & A.Gray) Britton & Rose	San Diego Barrel Cactus, Biznaga-barril Verdosa	northern Baja California, Mexico and California
Section Ferocactus		Ferocactus wislizeni (Engelm.) Britton & Rose	Fishhook Barrel Cactus, Candy Barrel Cactus, Biznaga-barril de Nuevo México	southwestern United States and northwestern Mexico.

=== Formerly placed here ===
- Sclerocactus brevihamatus tobuschii (W.T.Marshall) N.P.Taylor (as F. tobuschii (W.T.Marshall) N.P.Taylor)
- Sclerocactus glaucus (K.Schum.) L.D.Benson (as F. glaucus (K.Schum.) N.P.Taylor)
- Sclerocactus mesae-verdae (Boissev. & C. Davidson) L.D.Benson (as F. mesae-verdae (Boissev. & C.Davidson) N.P.Taylor)
- Sclerocactus pubispinus (Engelm.) L.D.Benson (as F. pubispinus (Engelm.) N.P.Taylor)
- Glandulicactus mathssonii (A.Berger ex K.Schum.) D.J.Ferguson 1991(as F. mathssonii A.Berger ex K.Schum.)
- Glandulicactus uncinatus (Galeotti) Backeb. 1939(as F. uncinatus (Galeotti) Britton & Rose)
