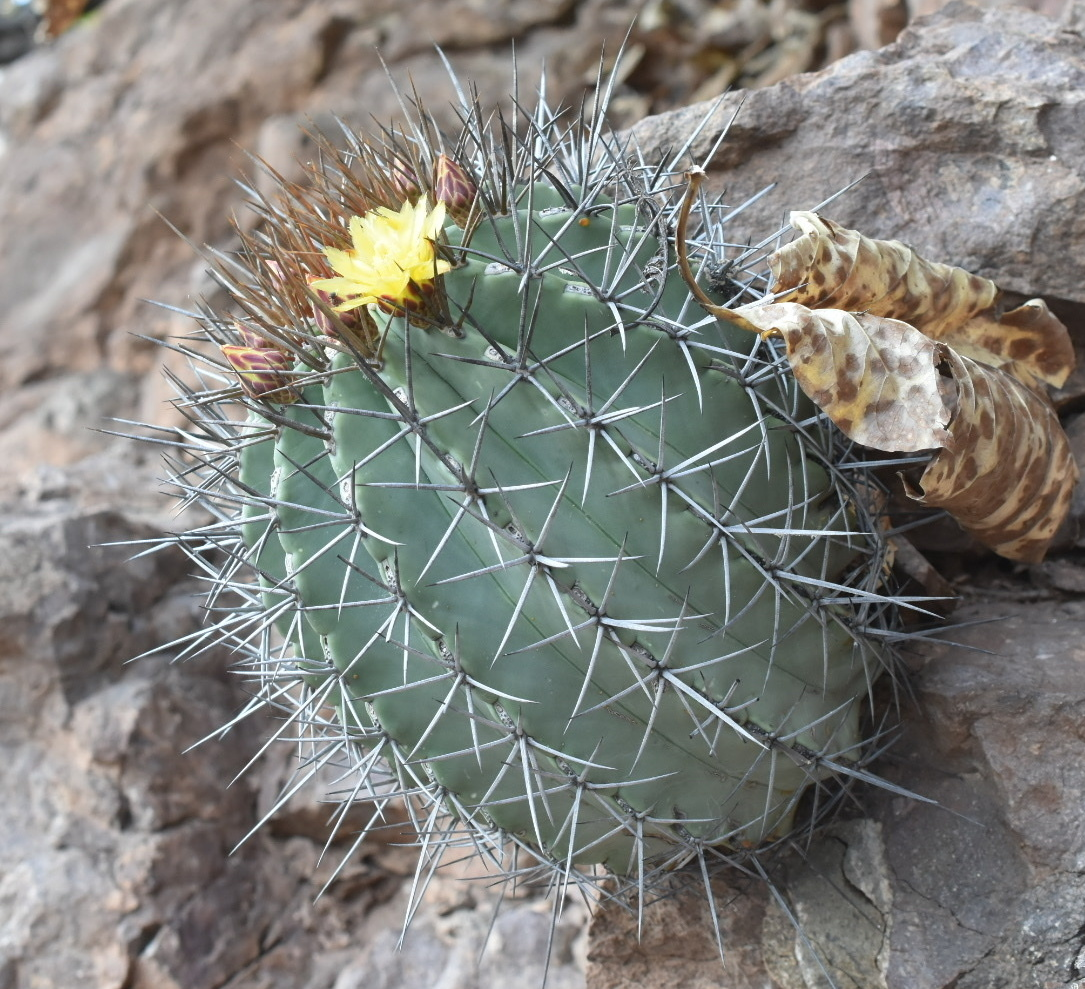

Conservation status
- Least Concern (IUCN 3.1)

Scientific classification
- Kingdom: Plantae
- Clade: Tracheophytes
- Clade: Angiosperms
- Clade: Eudicots
- Order: Caryophyllales
- Family: Cactaceae
- Subfamily: Cactoideae
- Genus: Ferocactus
- Species: F. lindsayi

Binomial name
- Ferocactus lindsayi Bravo

= Ferocactus lindsayi =

Species of cactus

Ferocactus lindsayi is a species of Ferocactus found in Mexico.

== Description ==
Ferocactus lindsayi is a solitary cactus that grows as spherical to short cylindrical shoots, ranging from gray-green to glauk-green in color. It can reach heights of up to 60 cm (24 in) and diameters of 40 cm (16 in), with 13 to 18 ribs. The gray spines are banded, with a single, straight central spine that is round and up to 4.5 cm (1.8 in) long, along with five to six straight or slightly curved marginal spines measuring 2.5 to 3 cm (0.98 to 1.18 in) in length.

The bell-shaped, yellow flowers of Ferocactus lindsayi can grow up to 5 cm (2.0 in) long and have a diameter of 3 to 4 cm (1.2 to 1.6 in). Its egg-shaped fruits, which are purple in color, reach a length of 1.5 cm (0.59 in).

== Distribution ==
This species is found between the Mexican states of Michoacán and Guerrero, specifically on the plain of the Balsas River.

== Taxonomy ==
It was first described by Helia Bravo Hollis in 1966, with the specific epithet honoring the American botanist George Edmund Lindsay.
