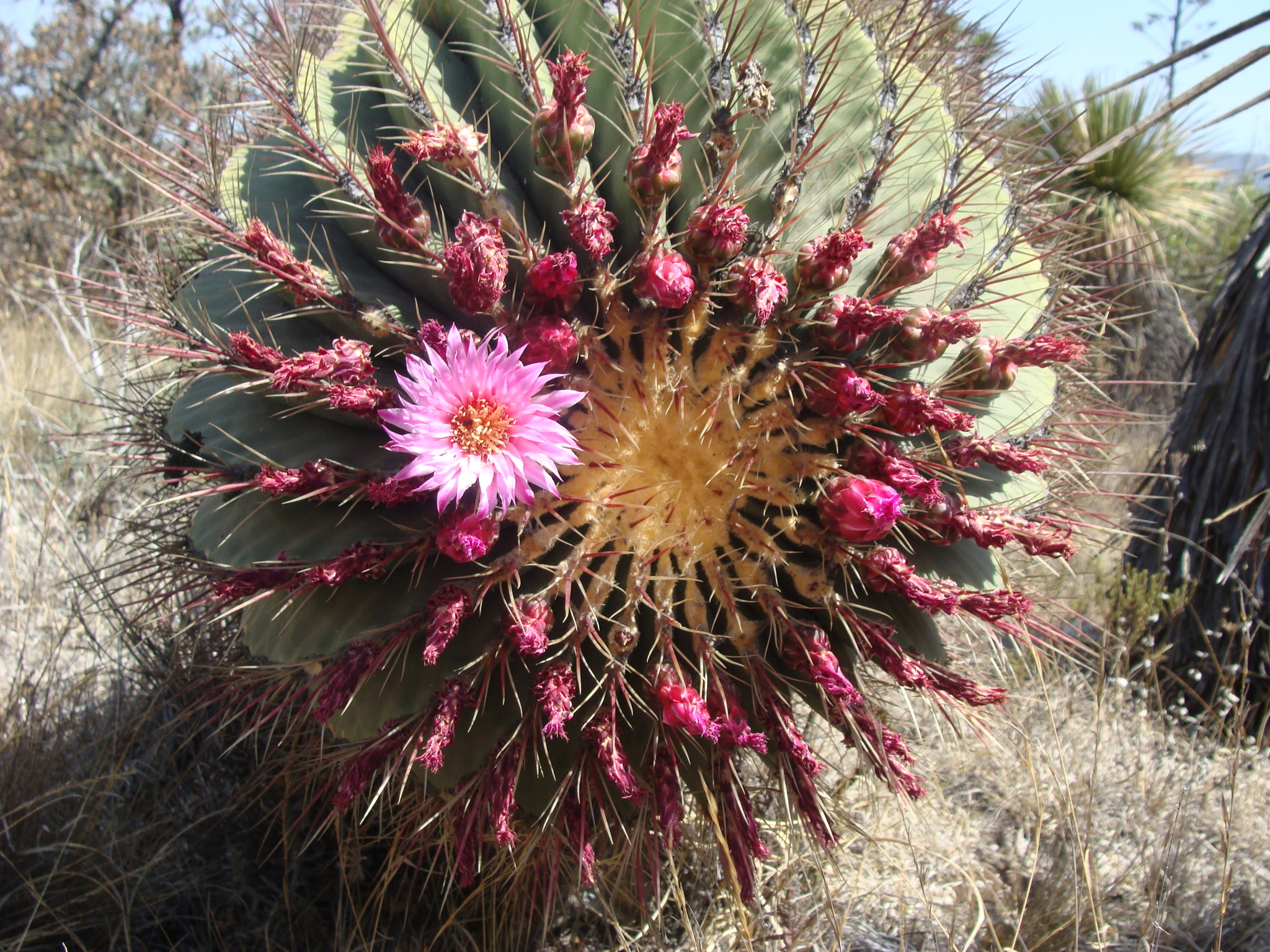

Conservation status
- Endangered (IUCN 3.1)

Scientific classification
- Kingdom: Plantae
- Clade: Tracheophytes
- Clade: Angiosperms
- Clade: Eudicots
- Order: Caryophyllales
- Family: Cactaceae
- Subfamily: Cactoideae
- Genus: Ferocactus
- Species: F. haematacanthus

Binomial name
- Ferocactus haematacanthus Bravo ex Backeb. & F.M. Knuth 1936

Synonyms
- Bisnaga haematacantha (Monv. ex Salm-Dyck) Orcutt 1926; Bisnaga pueblensis Doweld 1999; Echinocactus electracanthus var. haematacanthus Monv. ex Salm-Dyck 1850; Echinocactus haematacanthus (Monv. ex Salm-Dyck) Monv. ex F.A.C.Weber 1896; Ferocactus stainesii var. haematacanthus (Monv. ex Salm-Dyck) Backeb. 1961; Echinocactus flavispinus Meinsh. 1858; Echinocactus flexispinus Engelm. 1848; Echinocactus haematacanthus var. crassispinus Engelm. 1859; Echinocactus treculianus Labour. 1853

= Ferocactus haematacanthus =

Species of cactus

Ferocactus haematacanthus is a species of Ferocactus from Mexico.

== Description ==
Ferocactus haematacanthus is a solitary cactus with initially bluish-green, later green stems, growing up to 30-120 cm (47 in) tall and 25-36 cm (14 in) in diameter. The stems have 13-17 ribs and bear reddish thorns. Adult plants have merged areoles. The red spines consist of four central spines measuring 4 to 8 cm (1.6 to 3.1 in) long and six to seven marginal spines measuring 2.5 to 3.5 cm (0.98 to 1.38 in) long. The cactus produces funnel-shaped, purple-pink to rose-purple flowers measuring 6-7 cm (2.8 in) in length and diameter, followed by egg-shaped, deep purple fruits that are 2-3.5 cm (1.4 in) long.

== Distribution ==
This species is native to the Mexican states of Puebla and Veracruz, at elevations above 2200 meters.

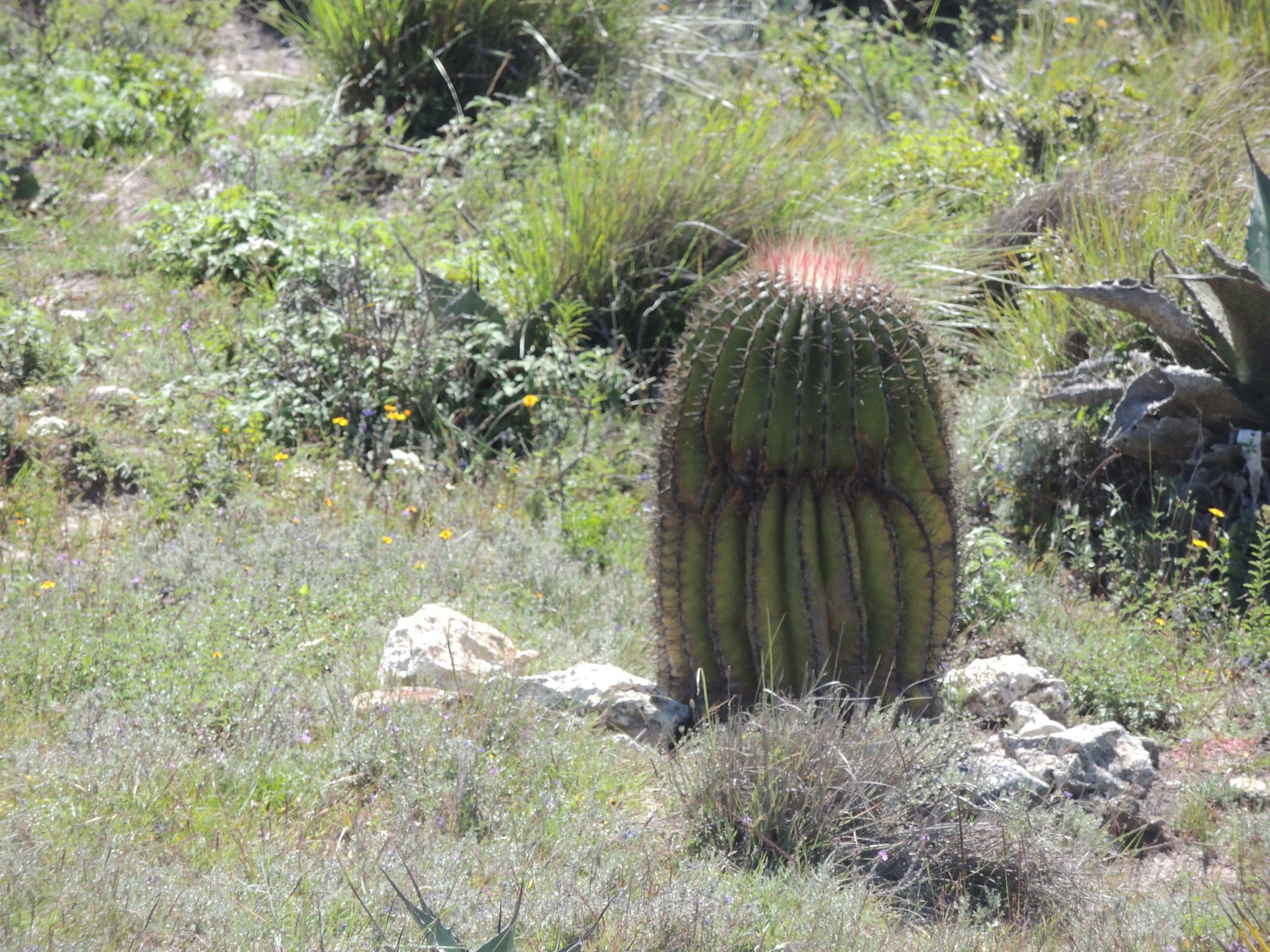
Plant growing in Acultzinapa, Veracruz, Mexico

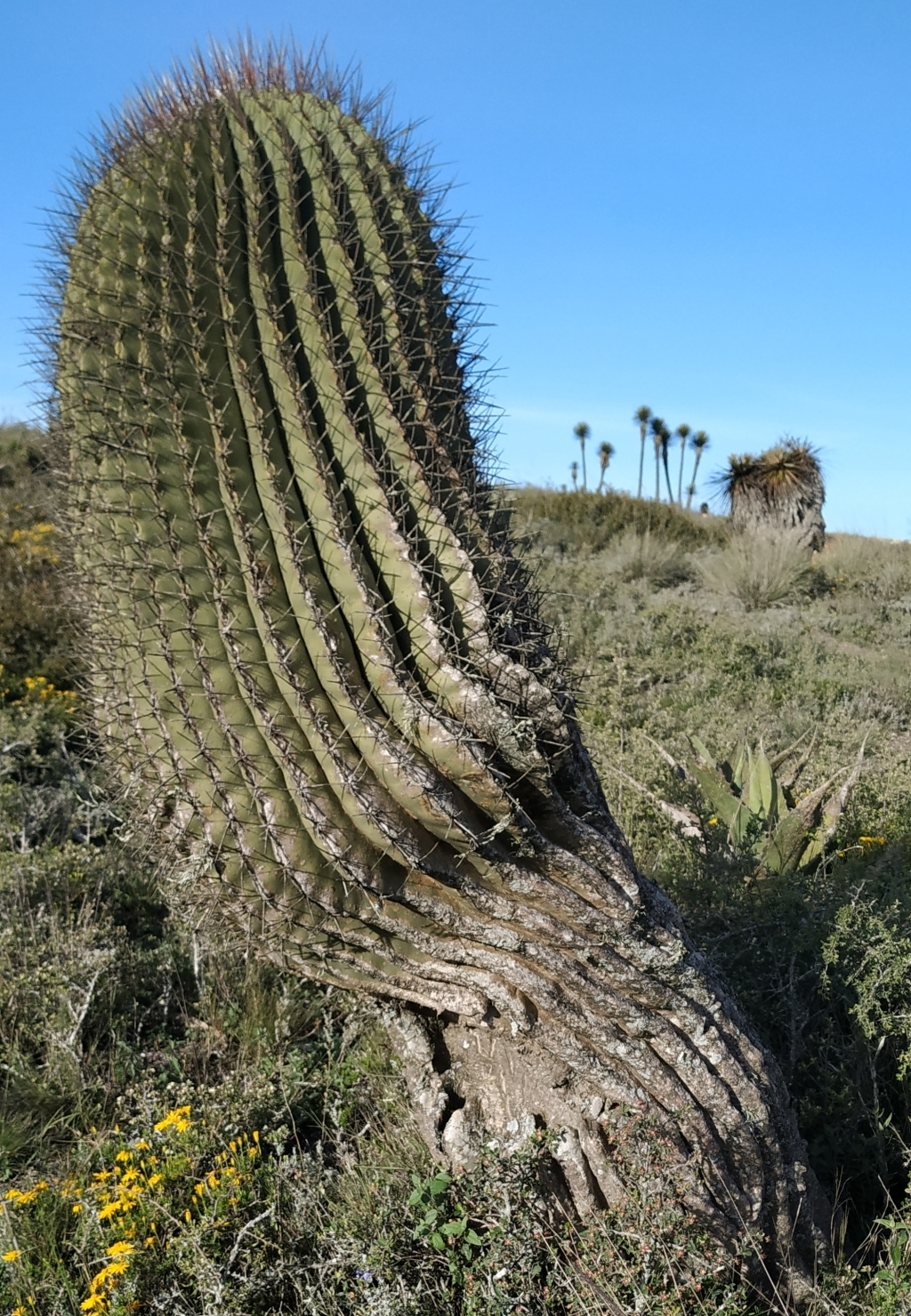
Habitat in Juárez, Puebla, Mexico

== Taxonomy ==
The cactus was first described as Echinocactus electracanthus var. haematacanthus in 1850 by Joseph zu Salm-Reifferscheidt-Dyck. Its specific epithet "haematacanthus" comes from the Greek words for "blood" and "thorn," referring to its dark red thorns. In 1936, Curt Backeberg and Frederik Marcus Knuth reclassified it into the genus Ferocactus.
