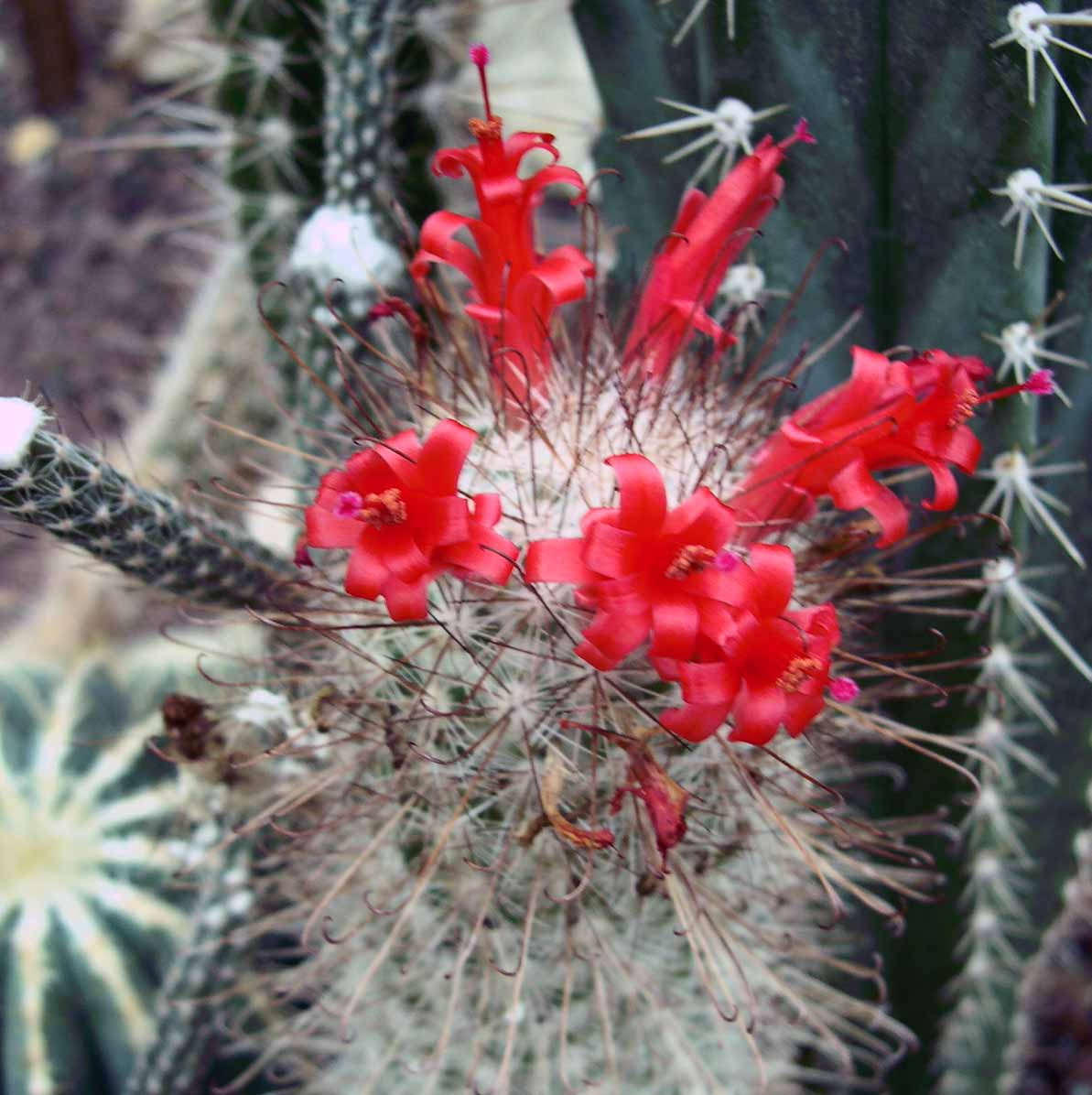

Scientific classification
- Kingdom: Plantae
- Clade: Tracheophytes
- Clade: Angiosperms
- Clade: Eudicots
- Order: Caryophyllales
- Family: Cactaceae
- Subfamily: Cactoideae
- Genus: Cochemiea
- Species: C. setispina

Binomial name
- Cochemiea setispina (J.M.Coult.) Walton 1899

Synonyms
- Cactus setispinus J.M.Coult. 1894; Cochemiea pondii subsp. setispina (J.M.Coult.) U.Guzmán 2003; Mammillaria pondii subsp. setispina (J.M.Coult.) D.R.Hunt 1997; Mammillaria setispina (J.M.Coult.) K.Brandegee 1897; Cactus roseanus J.M.Coult. 1894

= Cochemiea setispina =

Species of cactus

Cochemiea setispina is a species of cactus in the genus Cochemiea commonly known as the mountain cochemiea. It is endemic to the mountains of the central part of the Baja California Peninsula in Mexico.

== Description ==
Cochemiea setispina has a gray-green stems that sprouts from the base to form larger clusters. Each shoot is up to 30 cm (12 in) long and 3 to 6 cm (1.2 to 2.4 in) in diameter, with conical warts and woolly axillae. It has 1 to 4 central spines that are 2 to 5 cm (0.79 to 1.97 in) long and 10 to 12 flexible, whitish radial spines with dark tips. The zygomorphic flowers are 5 to 6 cm (2.0 to 2.4 in) in size and scarlet red, with prominently protruding stamens. The dark red fruits are about 2 cm (0.79 in) long, and the seeds are black.

== Distribution ==
Cochemiea setispina is endemic to the mountainous central region of the Baja California Peninsula, split between its two states. It occurs in the Sierra de San Borja, the Sierra La Asamblea, and Isla Ángel de la Guarda in southern Baja California, and in the Sierra de San Francisco and Sierra de Guadalupe of northern Baja California Sur. It is found growing on the slope of granite mountains along with Echinocereus ferreirianus, Echinocereus brandegeei, Mammillaria dioica and Ferocactus peninsulae.

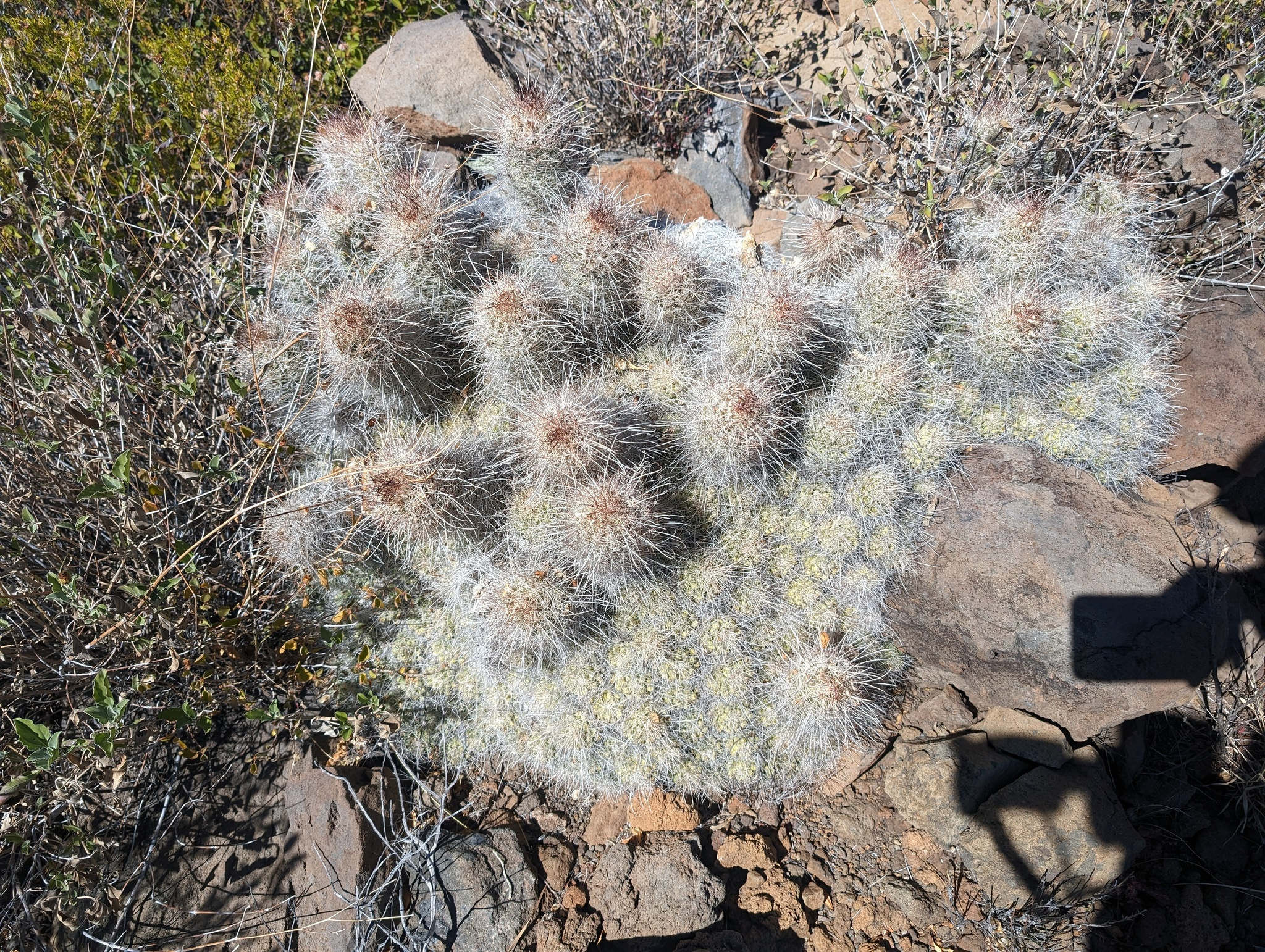
Habitat in San Gregorio, Baja California, Mexico

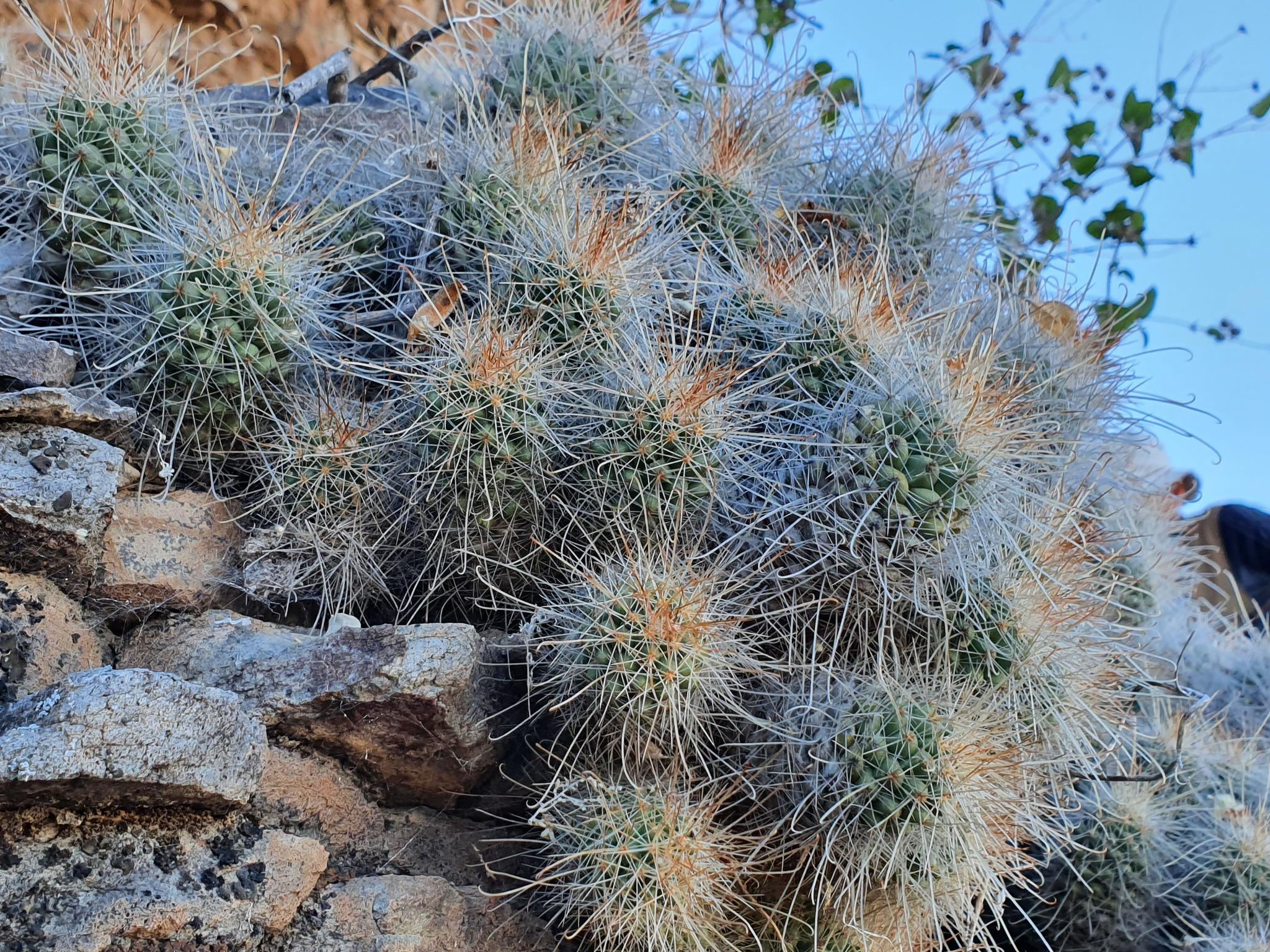
Habitat in Los Crestones, Baja California Sur, Mexico

== Taxonomy ==
It was first described as Cactus setispinus in 1894 by John Merle Coulter, the specific epithet setispinus derives from the Latin words "seta" (bristly) and "-spinus" (thorny), referring to the slender marginal thorns. Frederick Arthur Walton reclassified the species into the genus Cochemiea in 1899.
