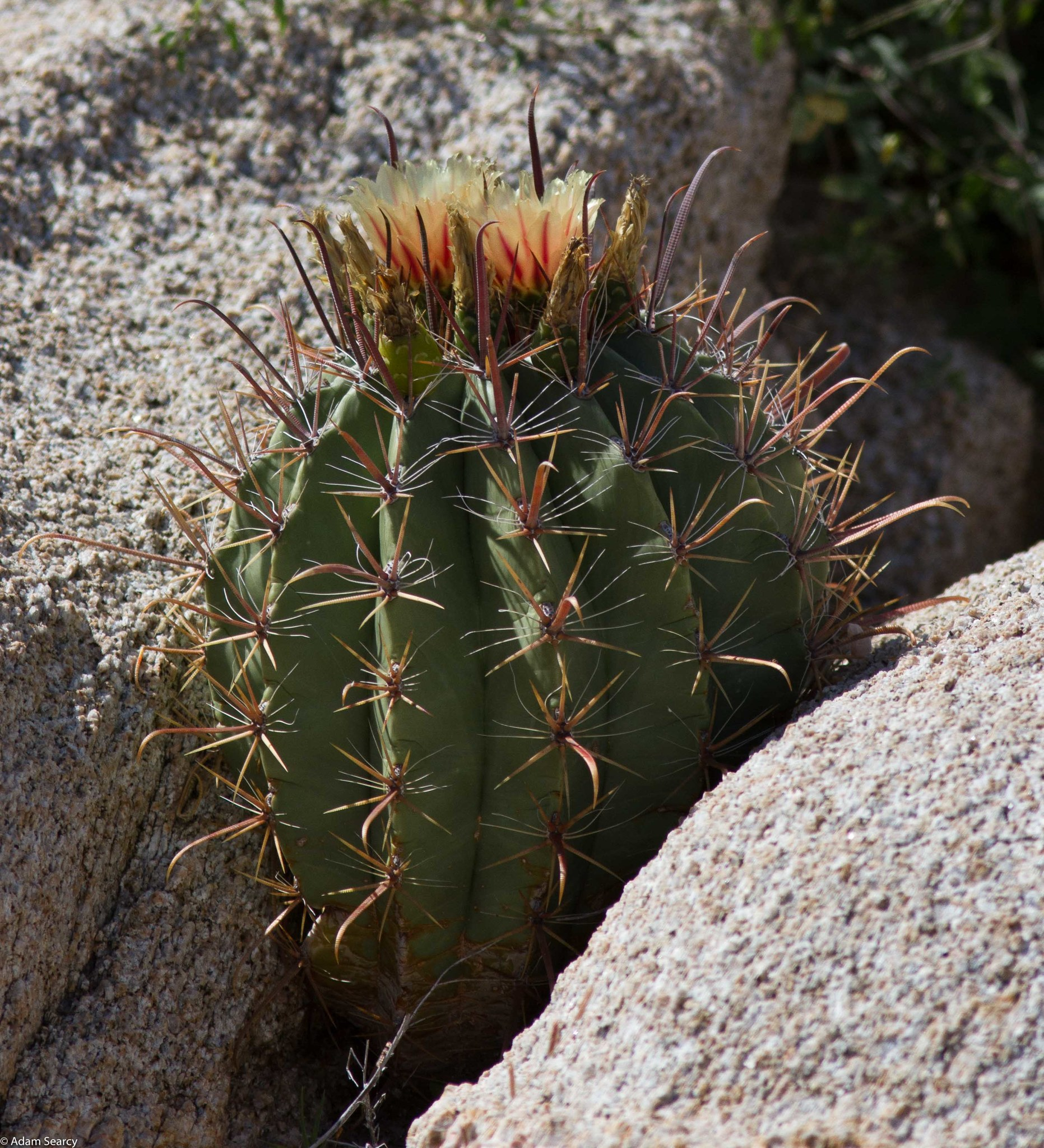
- Ferocactus townsendianus in habitat

Scientific classification
- Kingdom: Plantae
- Clade: Embryophytes
- Clade: Tracheophytes
- Clade: Spermatophytes
- Clade: Angiosperms
- Clade: Eudicots
- Order: Caryophyllales
- Family: Cactaceae
- Subfamily: Cactoideae
- Genus: Ferocactus
- Species: F. townsendianus

Binomial name
- Ferocactus townsendianus Britton & Rose 1922

Synonyms
- Ferocactus peninsulae subsp. townsendianus (Britton & Rose) Pilbeam & Bowdery; Ferocactus peninsulae var. townsendianus (Britton & Rose) N.P.Taylor

= Ferocactus townsendianus =

Species of cactus

Ferocactus townsendianus, commonly known as the Townsend barrel cactus, is a species of cactus endemic to southern Baja California Sur in Mexico. It is a barrel cactus that grows solitary stems up to 1 metre (3.3 ft) tall, with gray to brown spines, with one central spine on each areole usually curved or hooked at the tip, and orange to red flowers that bloom from May to August. Ferocactus townsendianus is similar to both Ferocactus peninsulae and Ferocactus santa-maria, and is sometimes placed under peninsulae as a variety or subspecies.

== Description ==
Ferocactus townsendianus is a solitary-stemmed barrel cactus with short-cylindric to slightly conical stems, usually to 50 cm (20 in) tall but sometimes to 1 m (3.3 ft). It has up to 16 ribs, often spiraled or somewhat undulate. The areoles are large and distant, with gray to brown spines. There are up to 16 radial spines, slender and widely spreading, and up to 4 cm (1.6 in) long. There are 3 to 4 central spines, with the principal spine typically curved or hooked at the apex (but sometimes straight) and the others straight. The central spines have an annulate texture.

The flowers appear from May to August, and are orange to red, measuring 5–6 cm (2.0–2.4 in) long. The outer perianth segments are shaped ovate and have a reddish color with yellow on the margins, while the inner perianth segments are shaped oblong-lanceolate and have a narrow pink stripe down the center with yellow margins. The filaments and style are dark pink. The almost globular fruit is 2.5 cm (0.98 in) long and yellow.

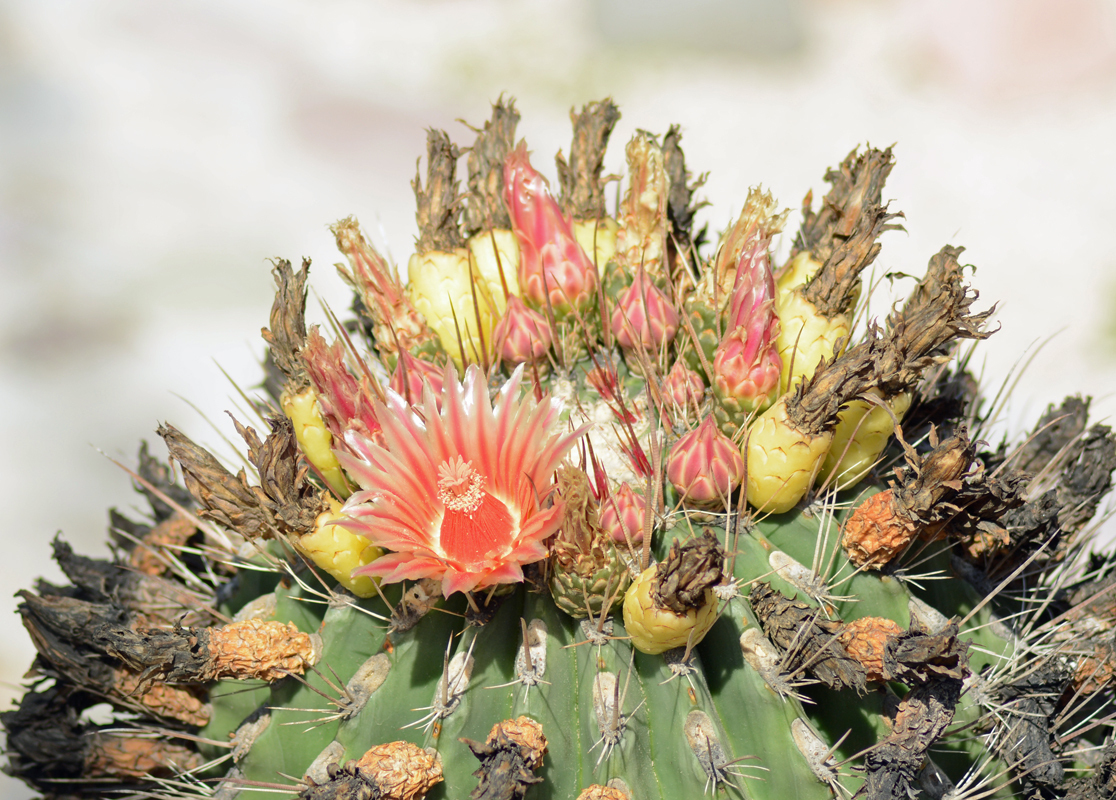
Ferocactus townsendianus in flower, with some fruits also visible

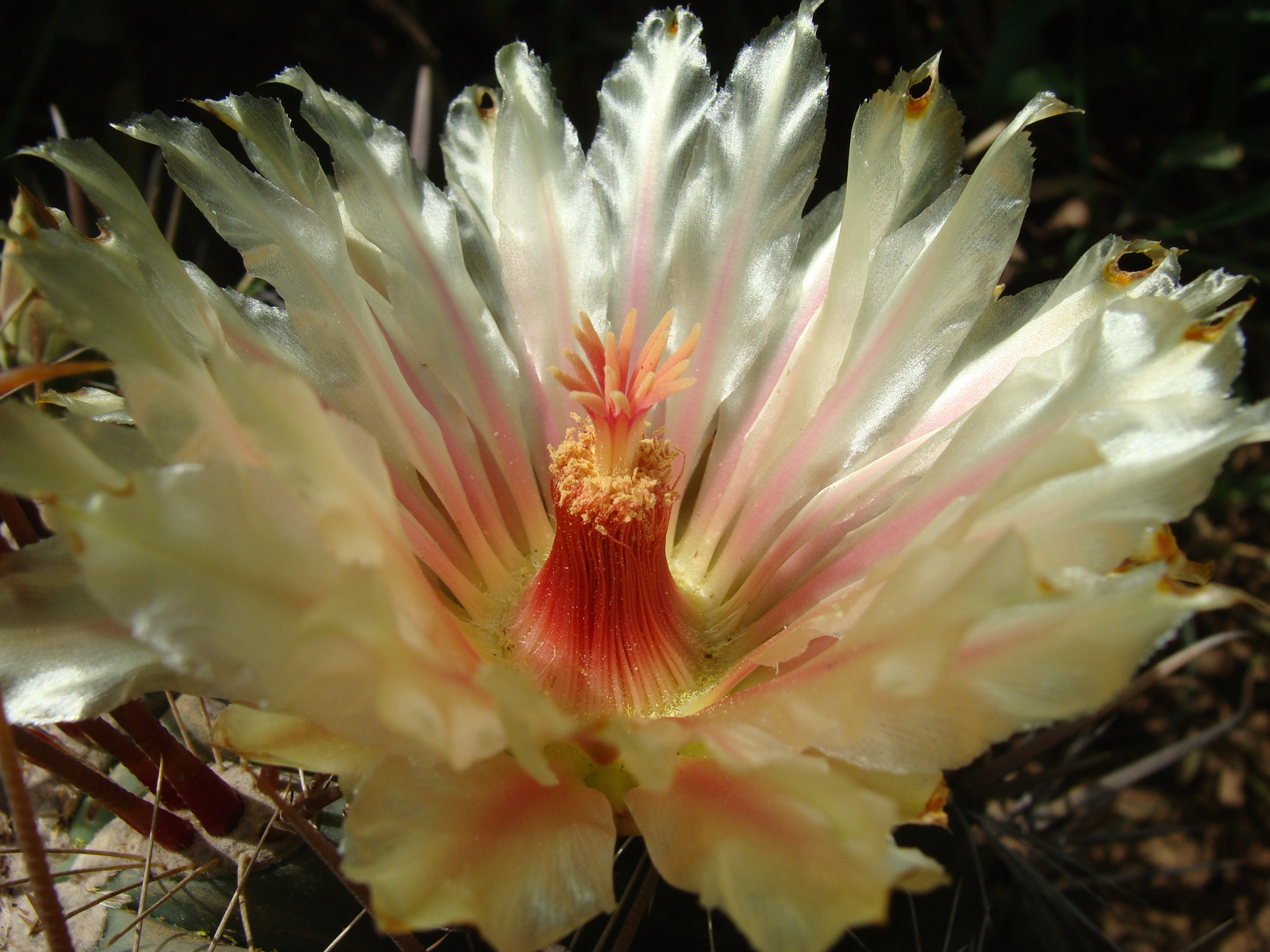
Flower closeup

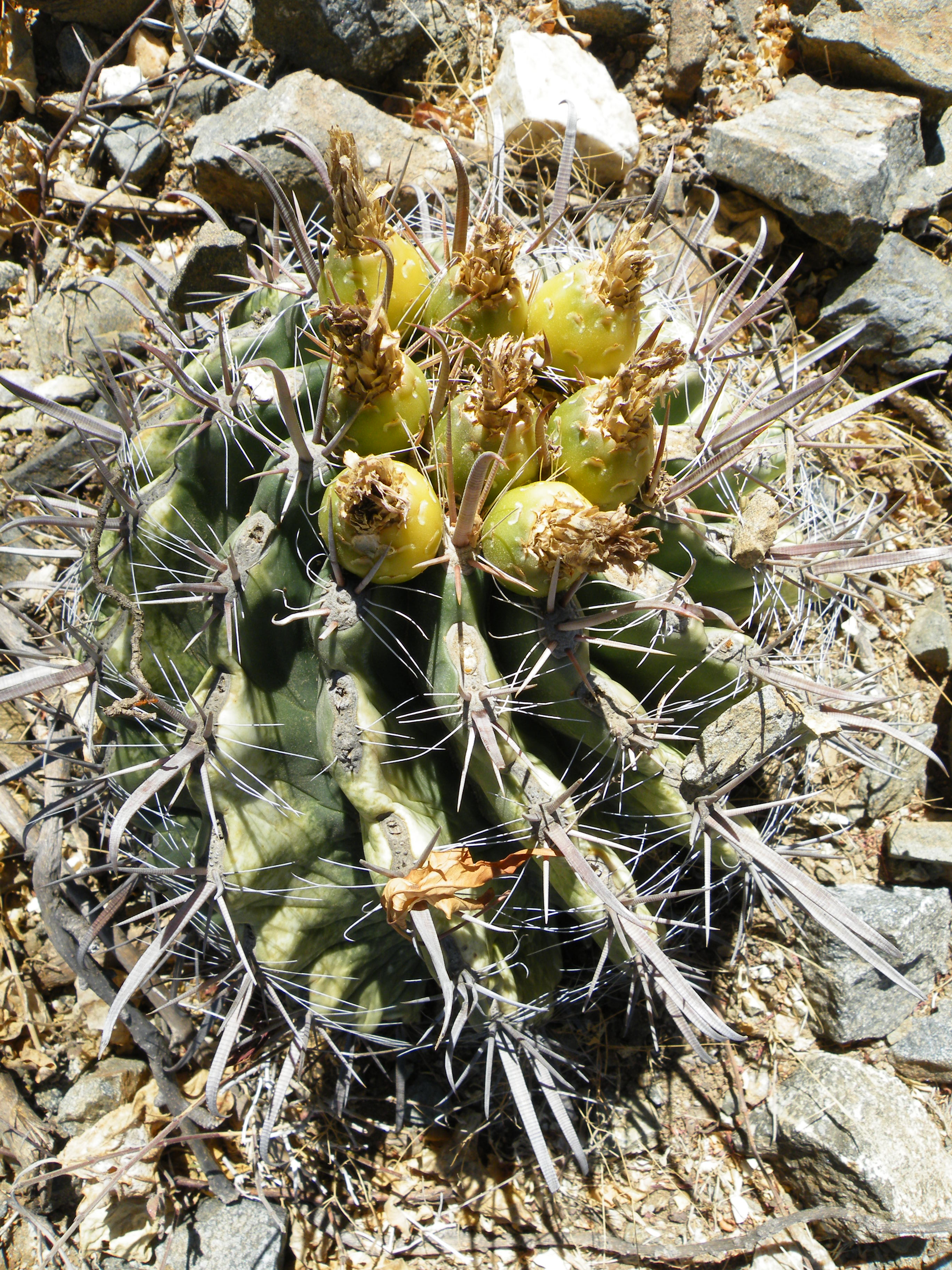
Fruits

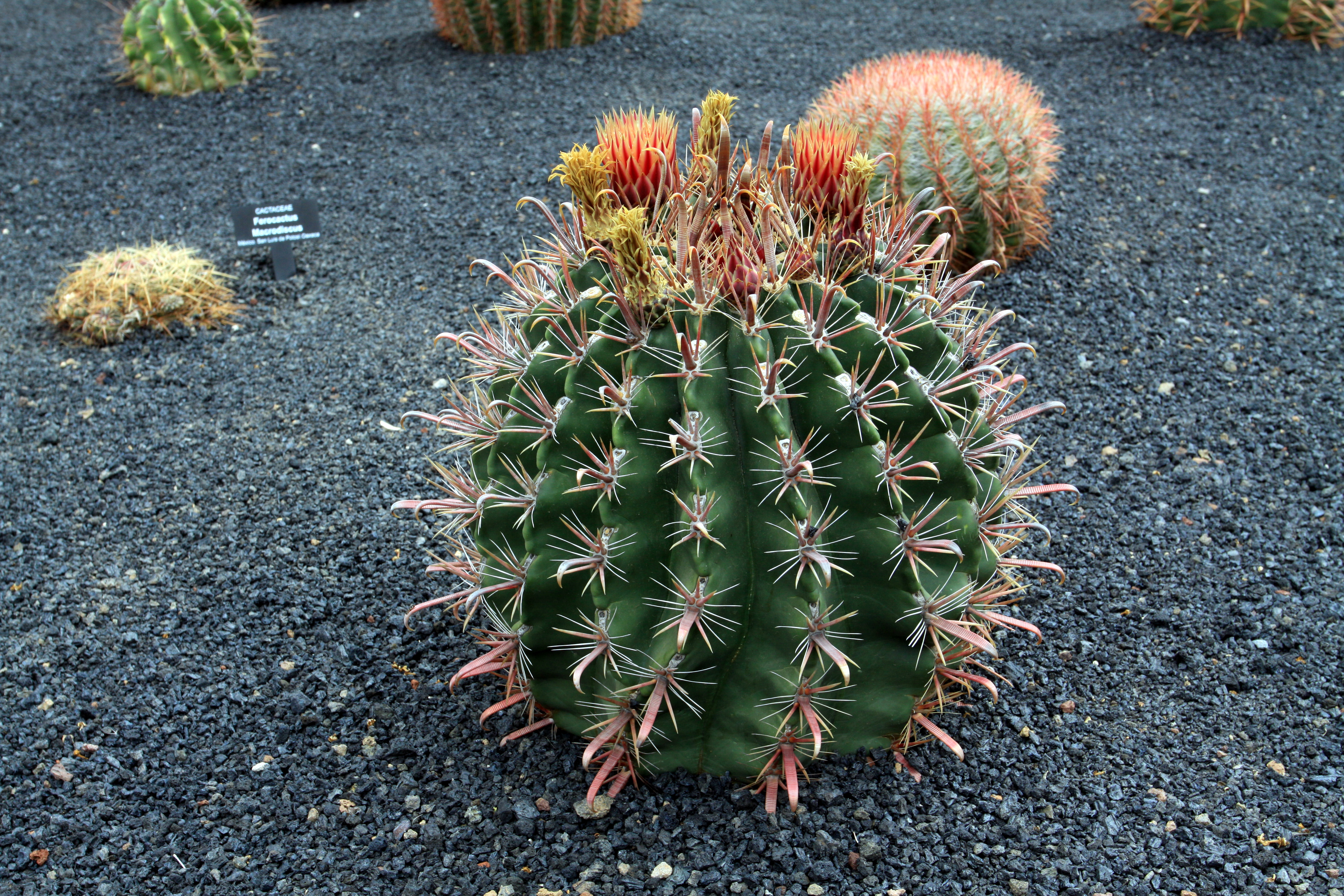
Plant growing in the Jardin de Cactus in Guatiza on Lanzarote, The Canary Islands, Spain

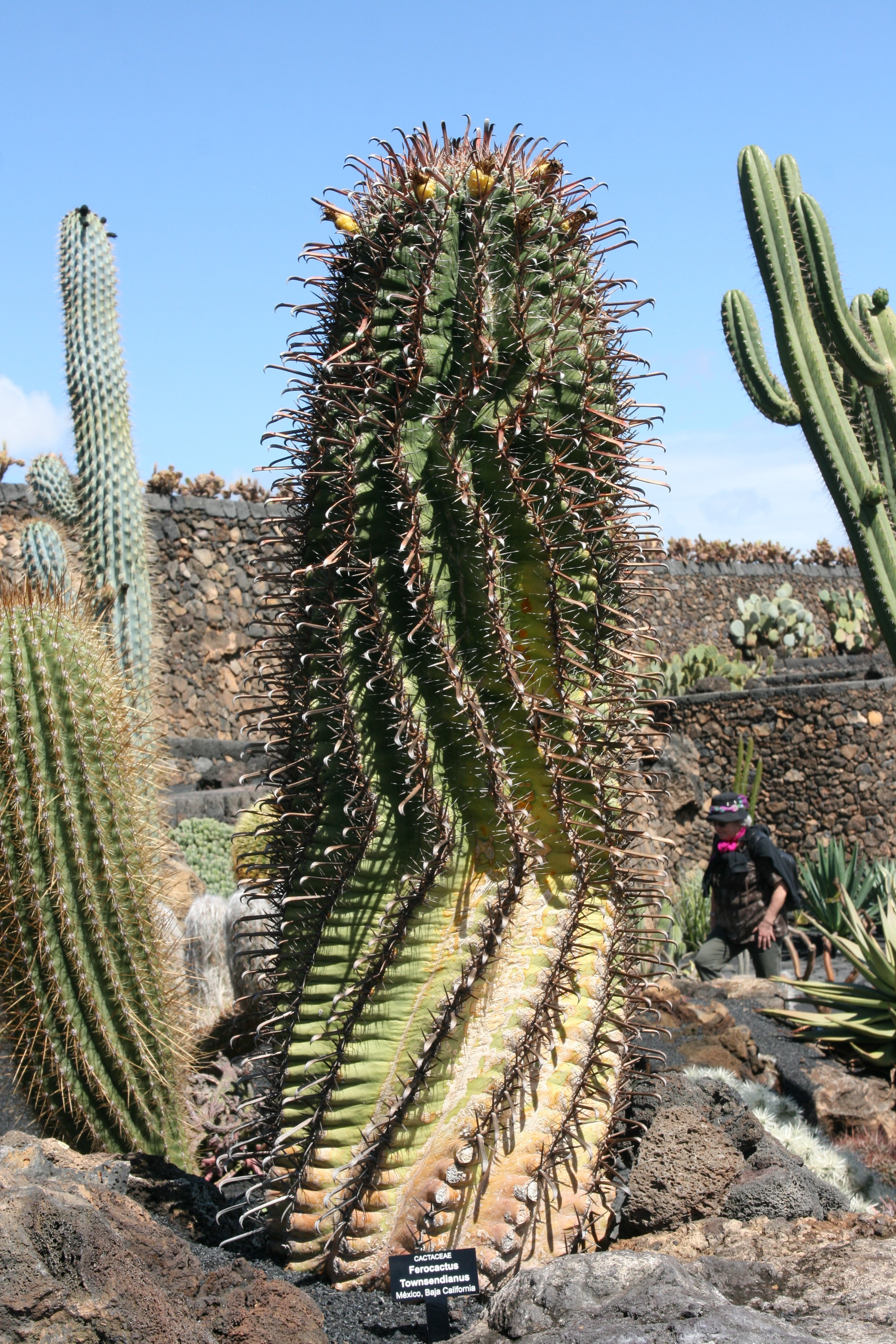
Adult plant

== Taxonomy ==
Ferocactus townsendianus was described by Nathaniel Lord Britton and Joseph Nelson Rose in their third volume of The Cactaceae in 1922. The type specimen was collected on Isla San José by Rose in March 1911 while visiting the Gulf of California on the USS Albatross. The specific epithet is named in honor of Charles H. Townsend, the director of the New York Aquarium, who was in charge of the scientific work of the Albatross when the ship was in the waters of the Baja California Peninsula, when Rose discovered the plant.

== Distribution and habitat ==
Ferocactus townsendianus is endemic to the state of Baja California Sur in Mexico. It ranges from the vicinity of Loreto and San Juanico to the southern Sierra de la Giganta and south into the Cape region. It is also present on Isla San José in the Gulf of California, and Isla Santa Margarita and Isla Magdalena in the Magdalena Bay on the Pacific coast.

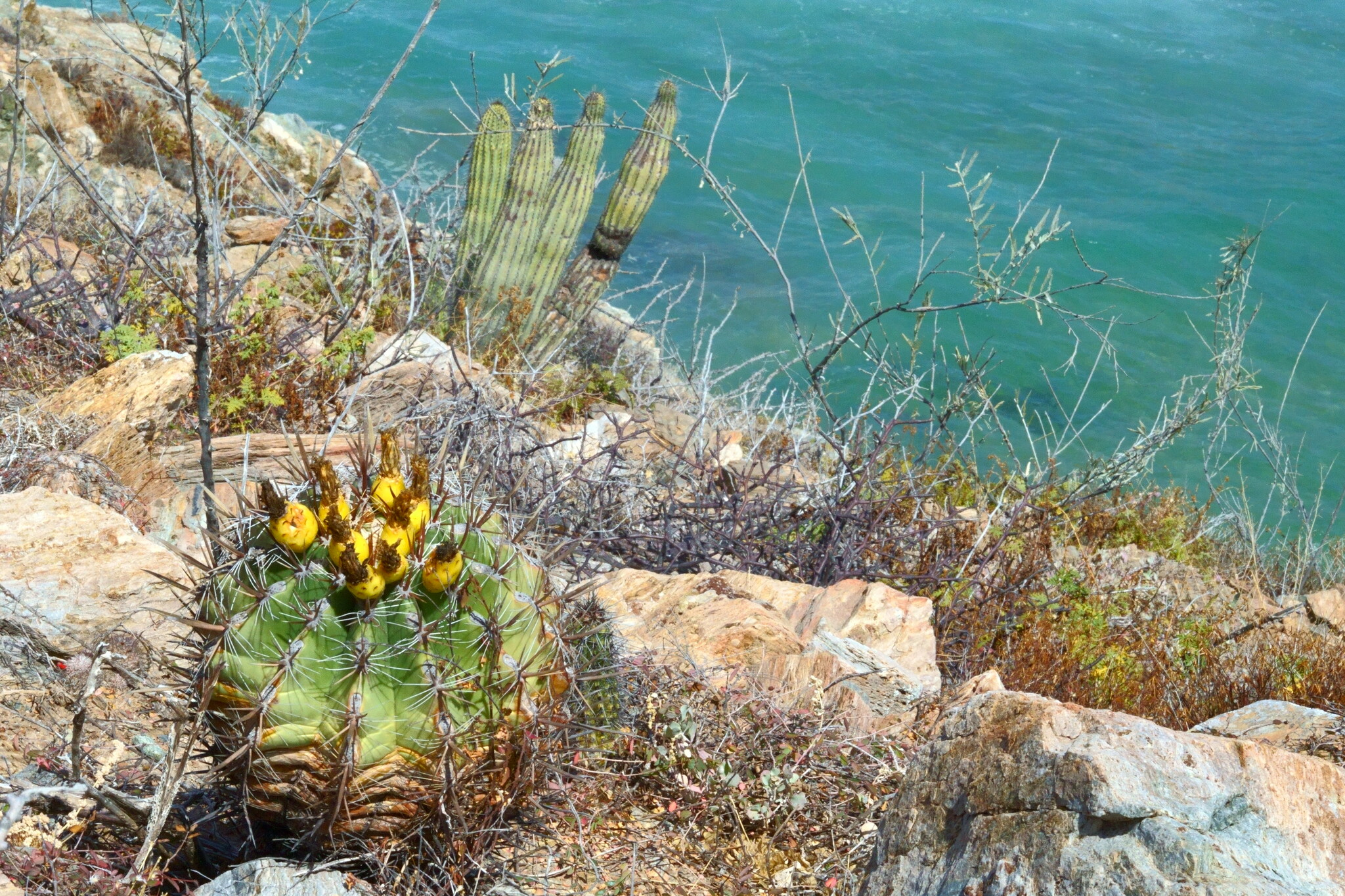
Habitat in El Pescadero, Baja California Sur, Mexico

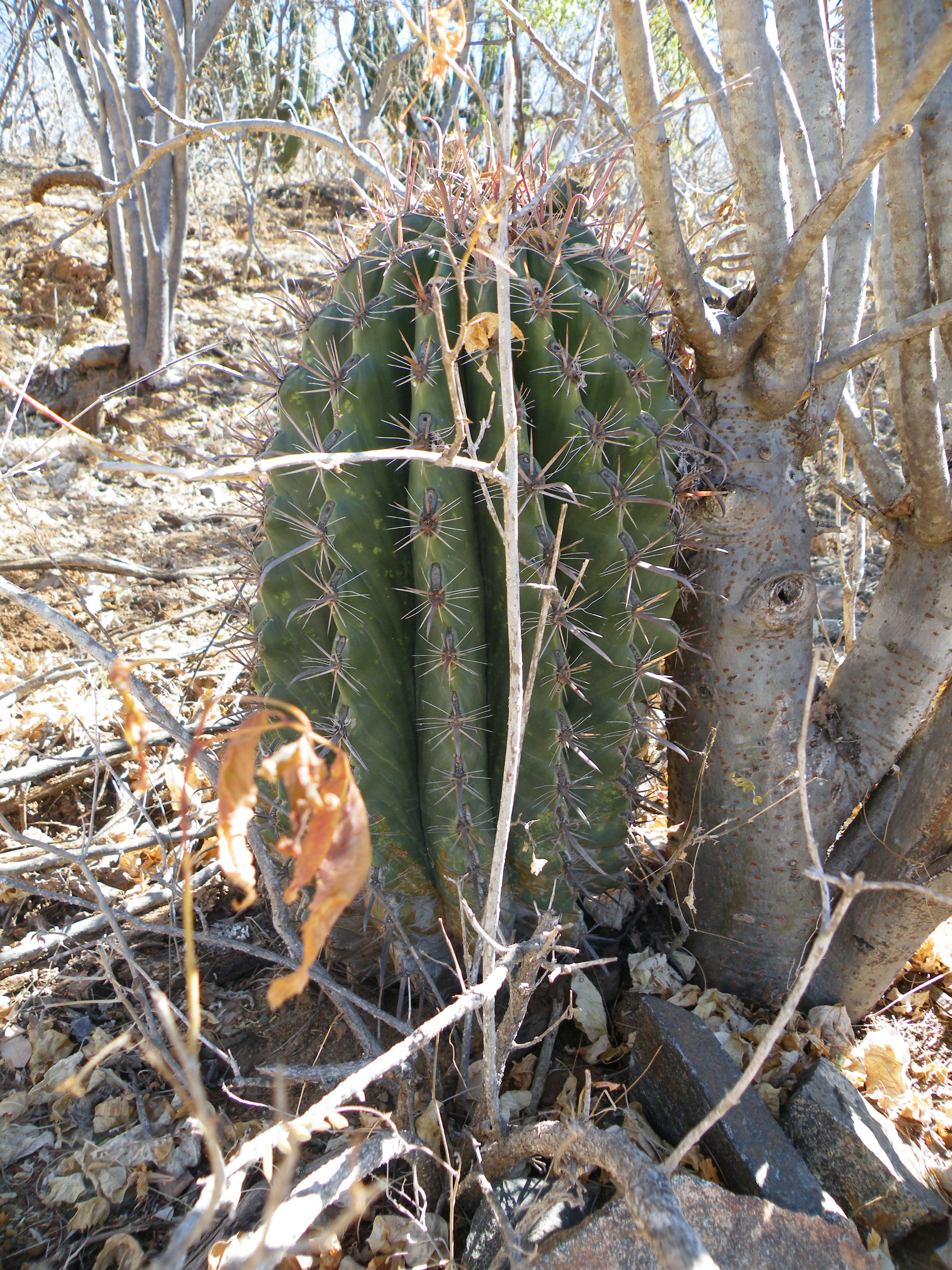
Plant growing in El Triunfo, Baja California Sur

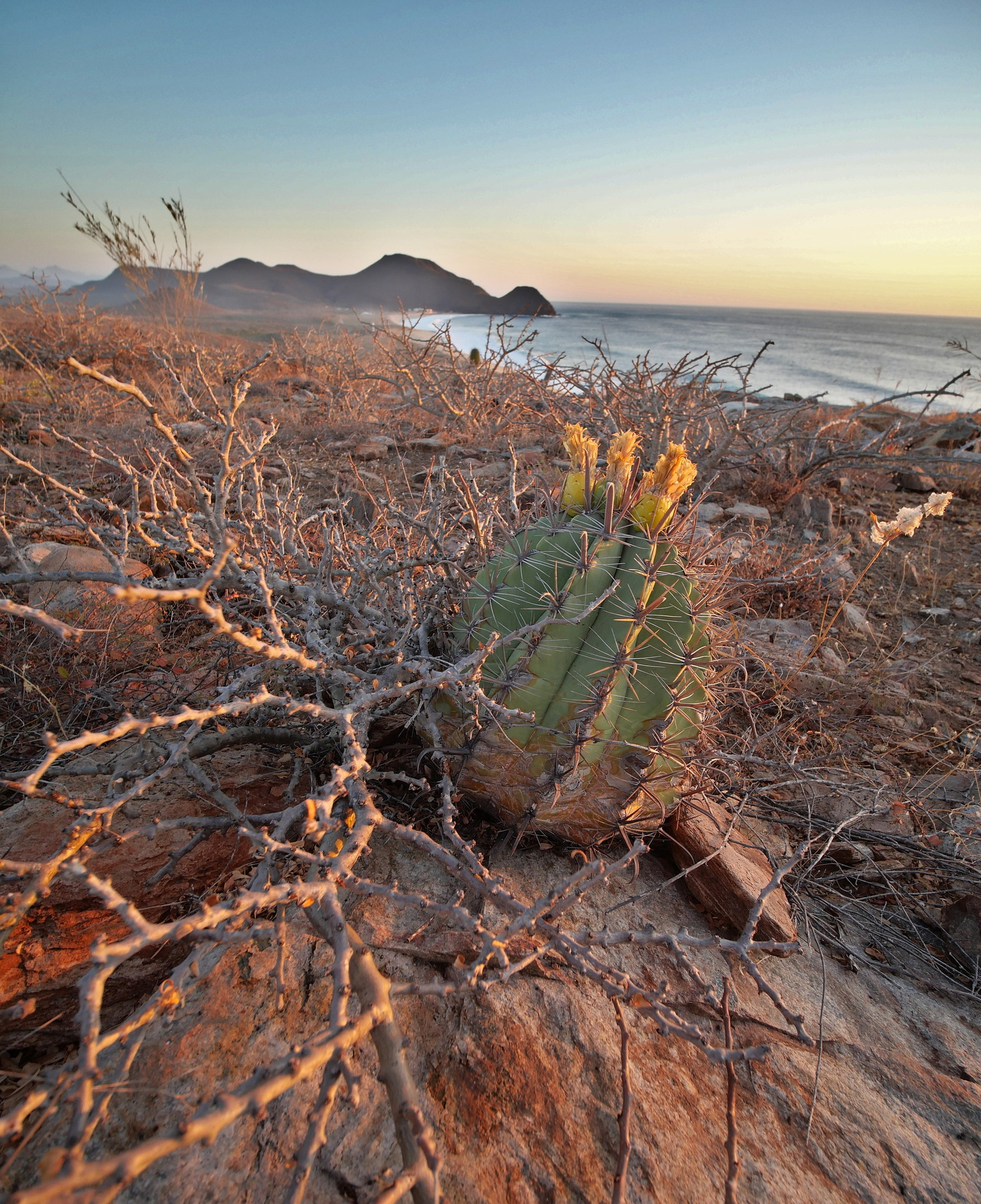
Plant growing near La Paz, Baja California Sur
