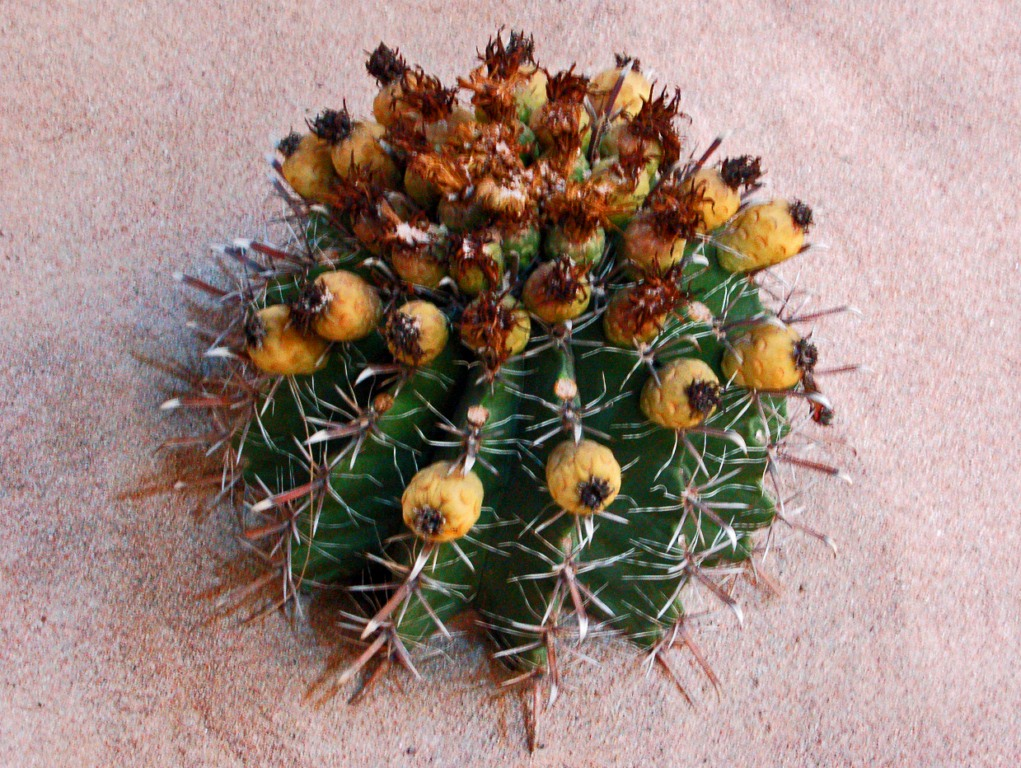

Conservation status
- Least Concern (IUCN 3.1)

Scientific classification
- Kingdom: Plantae
- Clade: Tracheophytes
- Clade: Angiosperms
- Clade: Eudicots
- Order: Caryophyllales
- Family: Cactaceae
- Subfamily: Cactoideae
- Genus: Ferocactus
- Species: F. peninsulae

Binomial name
- Ferocactus peninsulae (F.A.C.Weber) Britton & Rose, 1922

Synonyms
- Echinocactus peninsulae F.A.C.Weber 1895; Echinocactus peninsulae Engelm. ex J.M.Coult. 1895; Ferocactus horridus Britton & Rose 1922

= Ferocactus peninsulae =

Species of cactus

Ferocactus peninsulae is a barrel cactus in the genus Ferocactus of the family Cactaceae.

== Description ==
Ferocactus peninsulae reaches a height of about 70 centimetres (28 in), rarely 2.5 meters, with a diameter of 40 centimetres (16 in). This plant is oval to club-shaped and has 12 to 20 showy, deep ribs. The thorns are grayish-red and have a yellowish or whitish tip. The central spines are banded and 4 to 15 centimeters long with the lowest central spine is flattened and curved in a hook shape and the 6 to 13 different, radial spines are slender occasionally twisted and bristle-like. The funnel-shaped flowers are red to yellow and reach a length of 5–6 centimetres (2.0–2.4 in). The fruits are spherical, yellow, up to 4.5 centimetres (1.8 in) long.

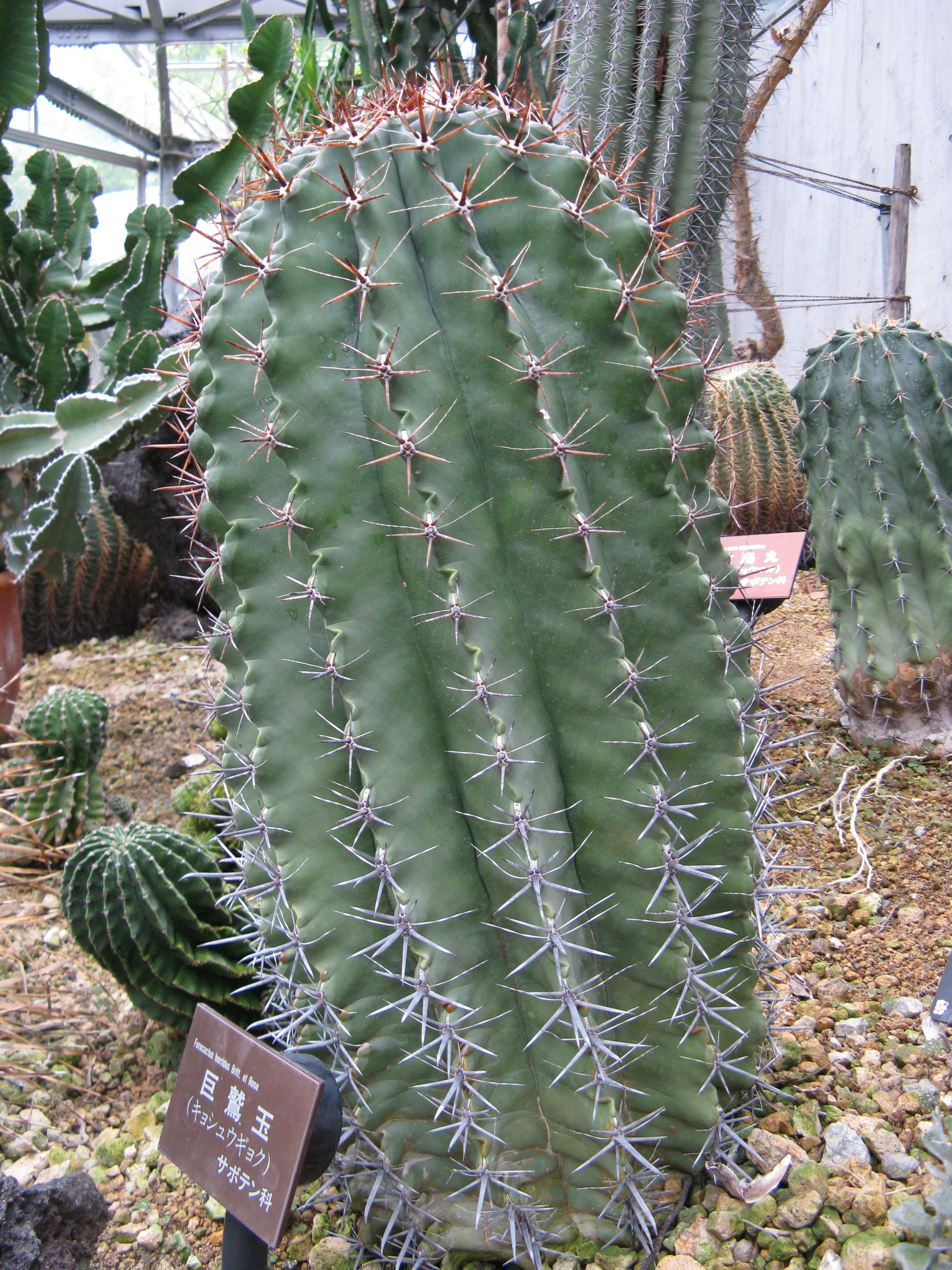
Plants of Ferocactus peninsulae

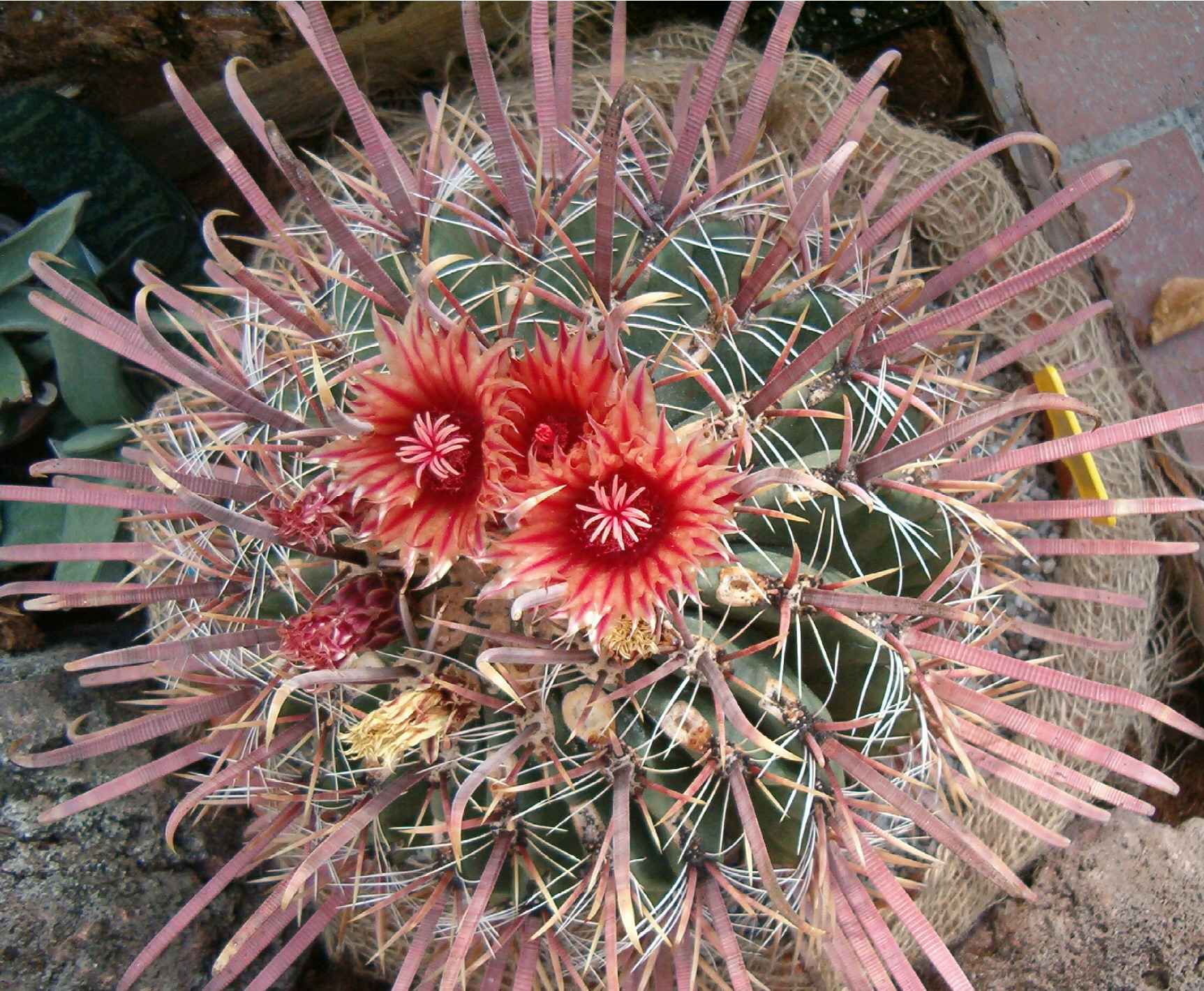
Flowers of 'Ferocactus peninsulae

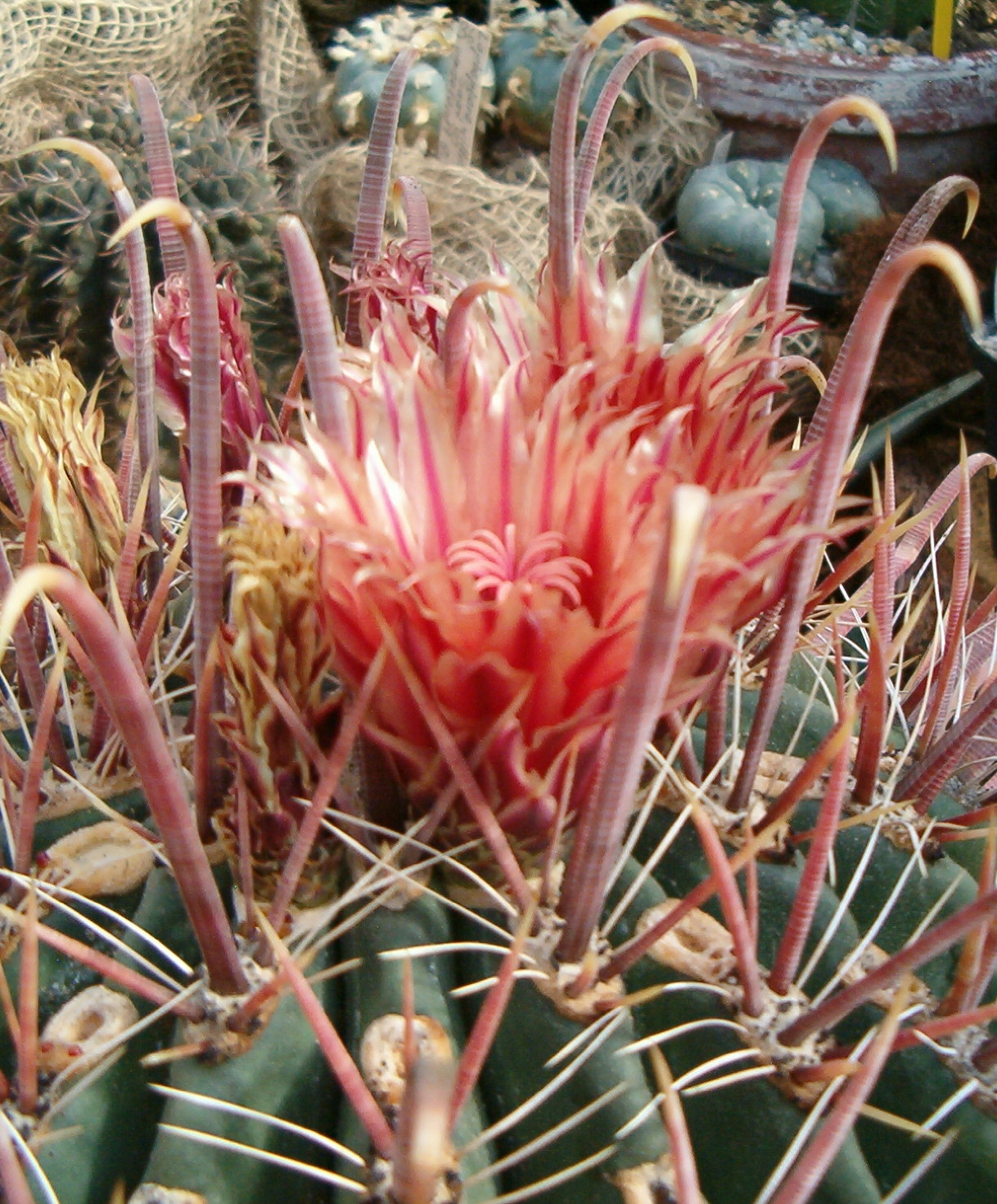
Flower of Ferocactus peninsulae

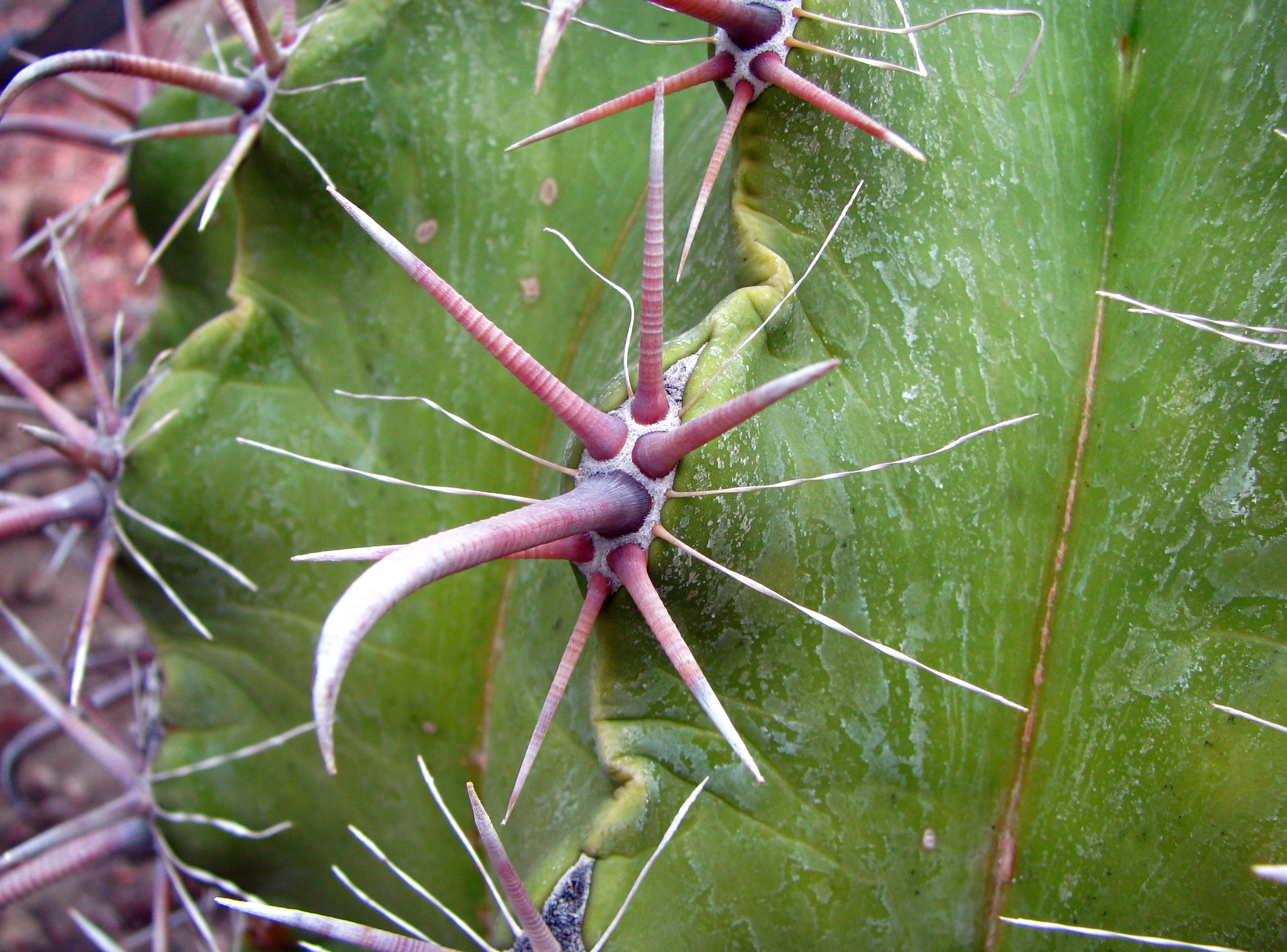
Thorns of Ferocactus peninsulae

== Distribution ==
Ferocactus peninsulae is found in the Mexican state of Baja California Sur growing on sandy hillsides at an elevation of 0 to 450 meters. Plants grow in association with Mammillaria dioica, Cochemiea setispina, Echinocereus ferreirianus and Lophocereus schottii

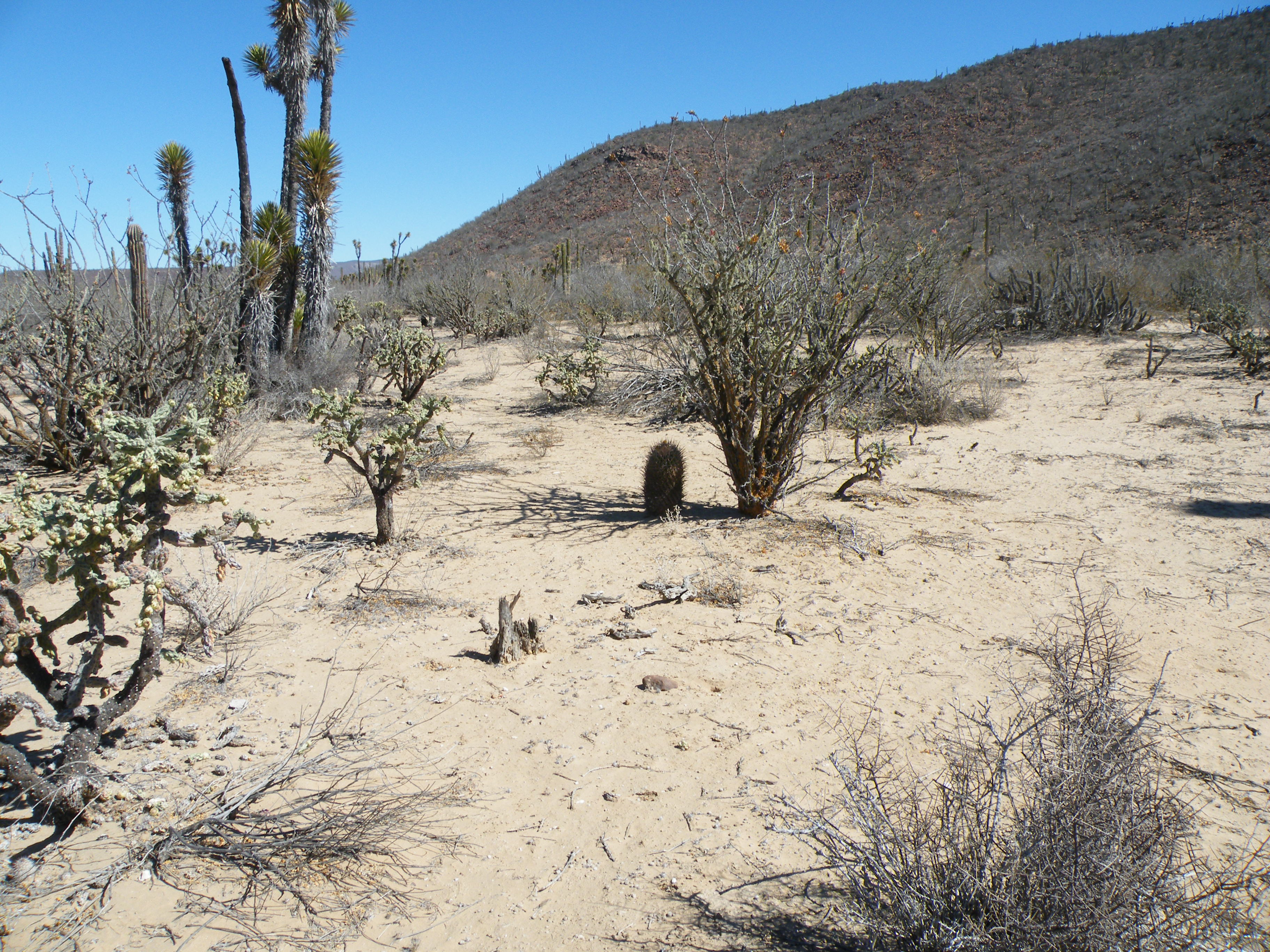
Habitat in Viscaino, Baja California Sur

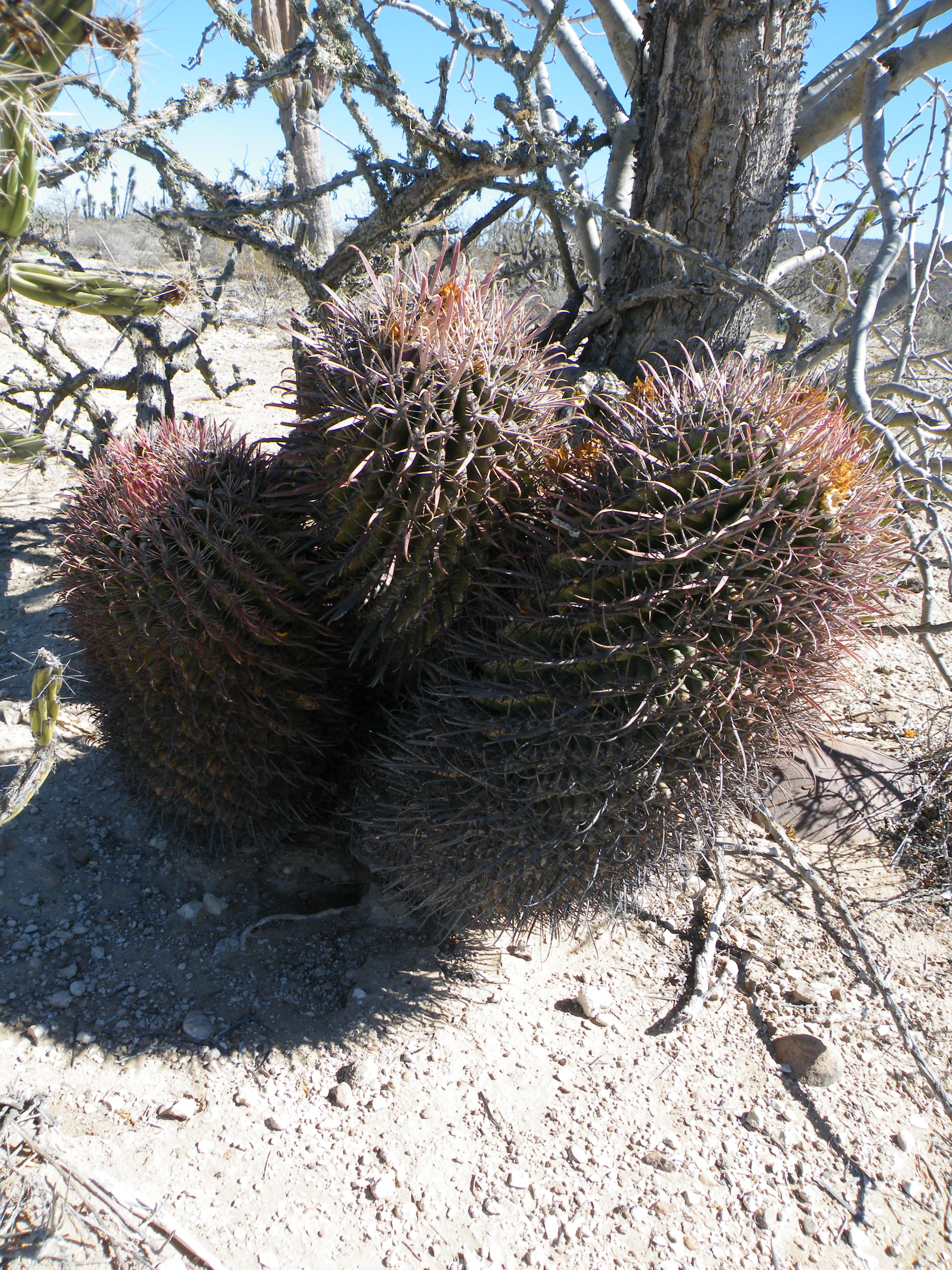

== Taxonomy ==
In 1896, Frédéric Albert Constantin Weber first described this species as Echinocactus peninsulae. The name "peninsulae" originates from Latin, meaning "peninsula," in reference to the species' presence on the Baja California peninsula. Nathaniel Lord Britton and Joseph Nelson Rose transferred the species to the genus Ferocactus in 1922.
