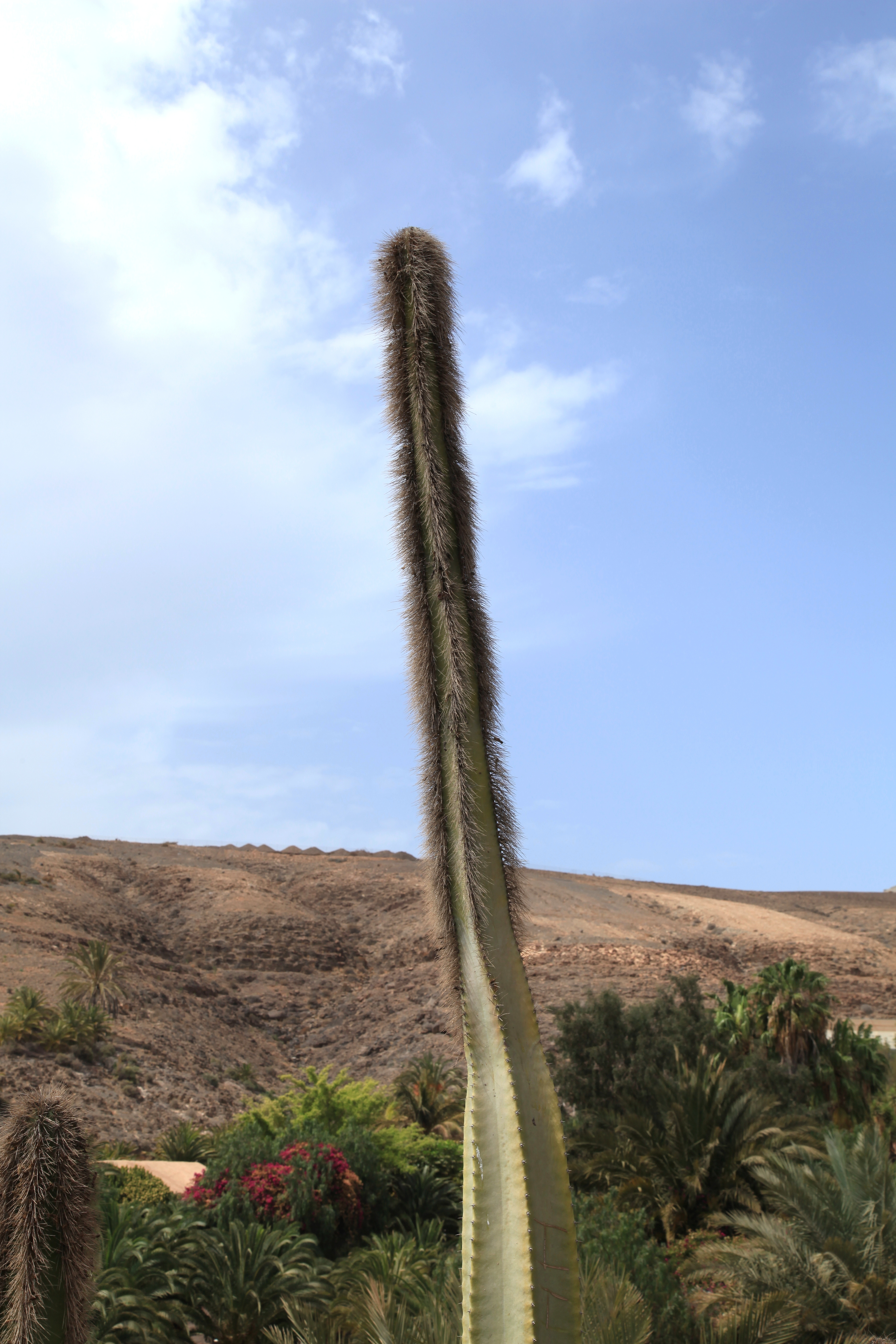
- Lophocereus schottii

Scientific classification
- Kingdom: Plantae
- Clade: Tracheophytes
- Clade: Angiosperms
- Clade: Eudicots
- Order: Caryophyllales
- Family: Cactaceae
- Subfamily: Cactoideae
- Tribe: Echinocereeae
- Genus: Lophocereus; Britton & Rose

Type species
- Lophocereus schottii

Species
- See text.

Synonyms
- Marginatocereus Backeb.; Cereus subg. Lophocereus A.Berger, 1905; Pachycereus sect. Lophocereus (A.Berger) P.V.Heath, 1992

= Lophocereus =

Genus of flowering plants

Lophocereus is a genus of cacti. It has often been merged into the genus Pachycereus, but was separated in a 2019 revision of Pachycereus, and is accepted by Plants of the World Online as of March 2021.

== Description ==
Lophocereus are bushy cacti, little or very branched from the base, with 4-15 pronounced ribs. They have variable spines depending on the species. In summer, on the sides of the stem, on the pseudocephalium in L. schotti, self-sterile tubular flowers of reddish, orange, or greenish color, sometimes yellow, emerge. It has scales on the outside. The flowers are pollinated by insects and bats. Its fruits are red globose and its seeds are black and shiny.

== Species ==
As of January 2026, Plants of the World Online accepts the following species:

Image	Scientific name	Distribution
	Lophocereus gatesii M.E.Jones	Mexico (Baja California Sur )
	Lophocereus schottii (Engelm.) Britton & Rose	United States (Arizona), Mexico (Baja California and Sonora)

== Uses ==
Its cultivation is very widespread in family gardens, to prevent erosion and for its fruits, and in gardens for its ornamental value.

The fruits are consumed fresh or dried and used to make sauces, ice cream and jams.

The stems serve as fodder. They are used as medicine for earaches, diarrhea, kidney and bladder problems, ulcers, tumors, even cirrhosis. It is also used to dye hair and prevent hair loss.

Its wood is used in construction and planted close together they serve as fences for corrals.
