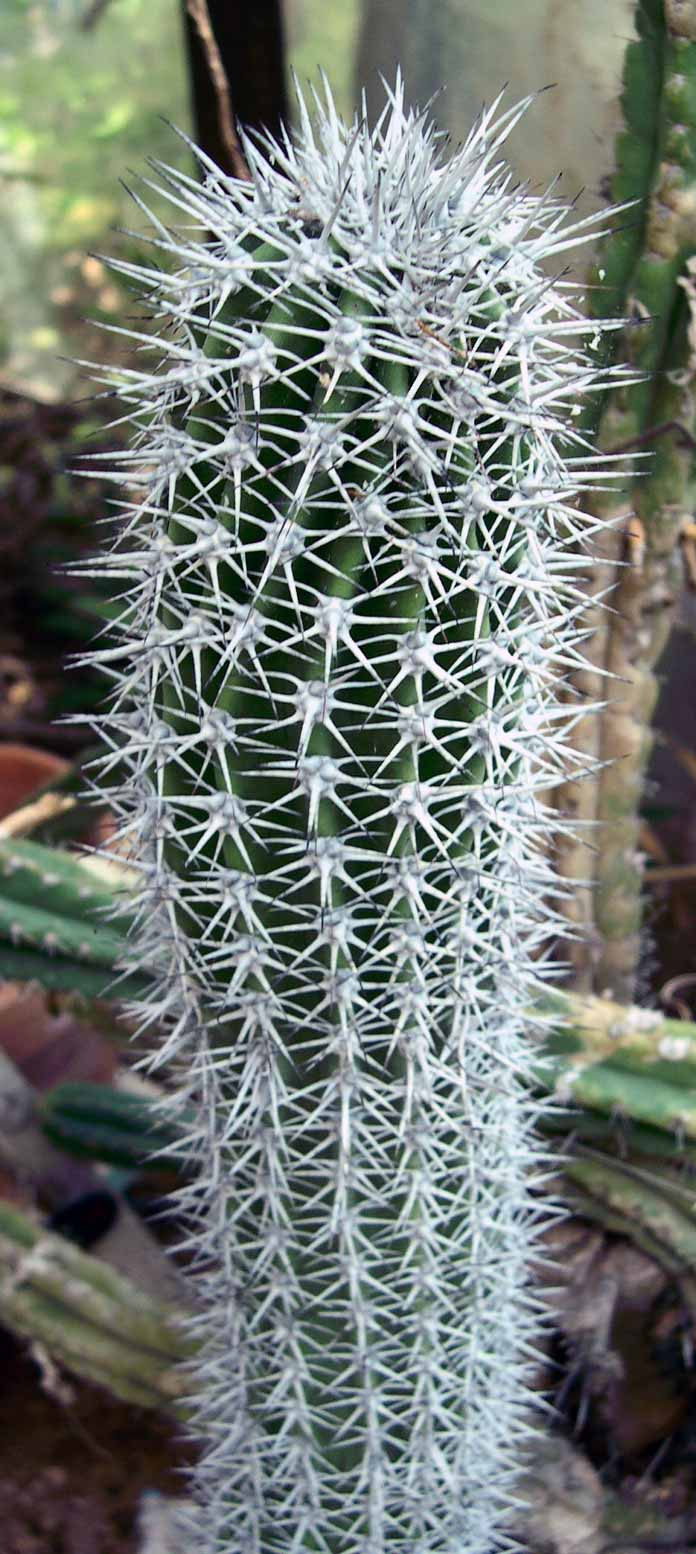

Conservation status
- Vulnerable (IUCN 3.1)

Scientific classification
- Kingdom: Plantae
- Clade: Tracheophytes
- Clade: Angiosperms
- Clade: Eudicots
- Order: Caryophyllales
- Family: Cactaceae
- Subfamily: Cactoideae
- Genus: Lophocereus
- Species: L. gatesii

Binomial name
- Lophocereus gatesii M.E.Jones

Synonyms
- Lophocereus schottii var. gatesii (M.E.Jones) Borg 1951; Pachycereus gatesii (M.E.Jones) D.R.Hunt 1991

= Lophocereus gatesii =

Species of cactus

Lophocereus gatesii is a species of plant in the family Cactaceae.

== Description ==
Lophocereus gatesii grows shrubby, is richly branched and often forms groups with heights of up to 2 meters and diameters of 3 meters. The shoots, which initially curve outwards and upwards and later become upright, are light olive green and have a diameter of 5 to 8 cm (2.0 to 3.1 in). There are ten to 15 sharp-edged ribs. The thorns cannot be differentiated into central and marginal thorns and are different in the lower and upper parts of the shoot. The eleven to 15 spines arising from the lower areoles are enlarged at their base and are 5 to 15 mm (0.20 to 0.59 in) long. From the upper areoles or pseudocephalium appear 15 to 20 thin, twisted, bristle-like spines up to 6 cm (2.4 in) long.

The funnel-shaped, coral-pink flowers are up to 3 cm (1.2 in) long and the same diameter. Its pericarpel and floral tube are scaled. The spherical, red fruits covered with broad, bare scales reach a diameter of 2.5 cm (0.98 in) and contain red pulp.

== Distribution ==
Lophocereus gatesii is widespread in the Mexican state of Baja California Sur between Todos Santos and Isla Santa Margarita at altitudes of 0 to 100 m.

== Taxonomy ==
The first description by Marcus Eugene Jones was published in 1934. Nomenclature synonyms are Lophocereus schottii var. gatesii (M.E.Jones) Borg (1951) and Pachycereus gatesii (M.E.Jones) D.R.Hunt (1991).
