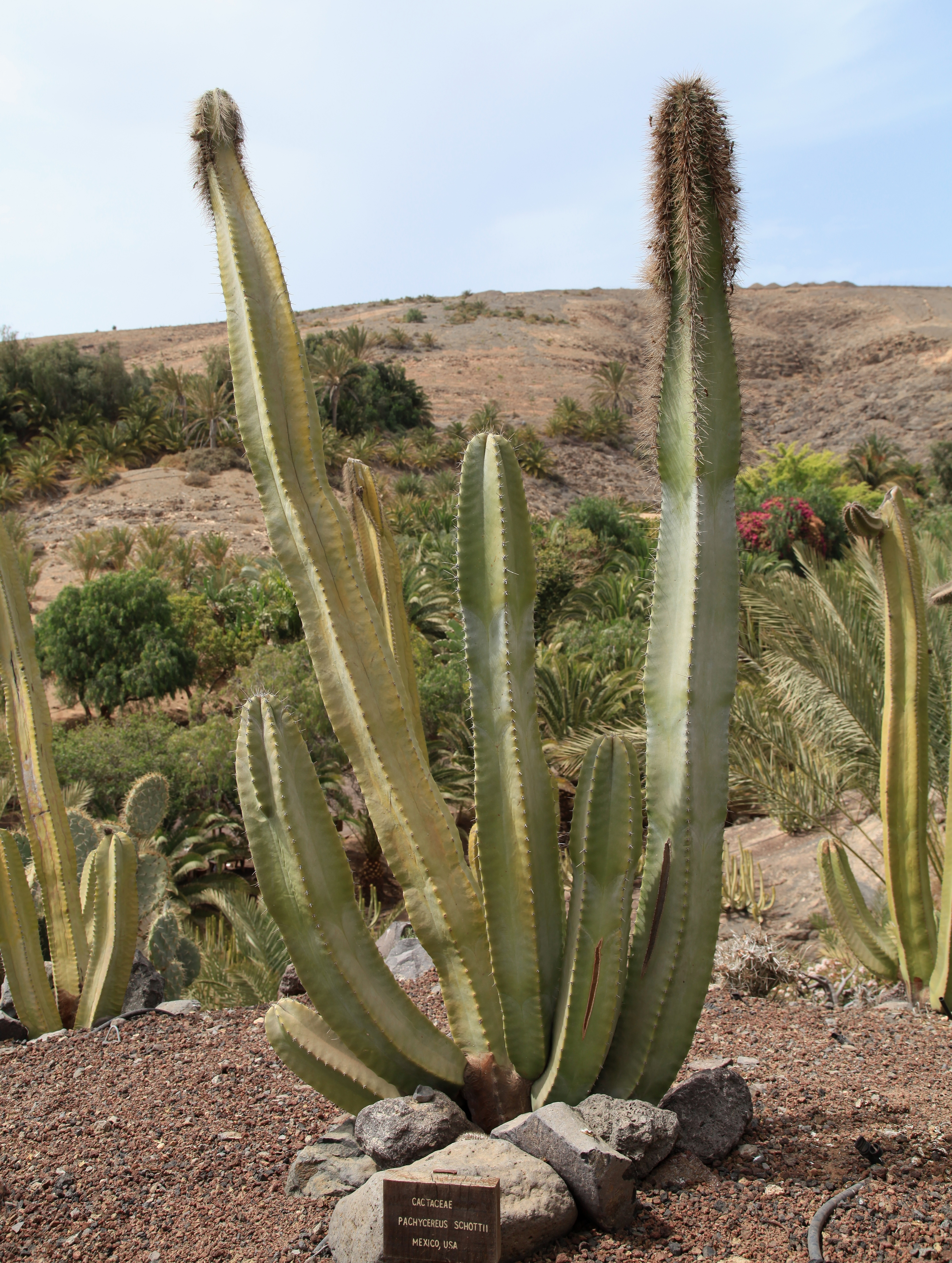

Conservation status
- Least Concern (IUCN 3.1)

Scientific classification
- Kingdom: Plantae
- Clade: Tracheophytes
- Clade: Angiosperms
- Clade: Eudicots
- Order: Caryophyllales
- Family: Cactaceae
- Subfamily: Cactoideae
- Genus: Lophocereus
- Species: L. schottii

Binomial name
- Lophocereus schottii (Engelm.) Britton & Rose

Synonyms
- Cereus mieckleyanus Weing.; Cereus palmeri F.A.C.Weber; Cereus sargentianus Orcutt; Cereus schottii Engelm.; Lemaireocereus mieckleyanus (Weing.) Borg; Lophocereus australis Britton & Rose; Lophocereus mieckleyanus (Weing.) Backeb.; Lophocereus sargentianus (Orcutt) Britton & Rose; Pachycereus schottii (Engelm.) D.R.Hunt; Pilocereus sargentianus Orcutt ex K.Schum.; Pilocereus schottii (Engelm.) Lem.

= Lophocereus schottii =

Species of cactus

Lophocereus schottii, the senita cactus, is a species of cactus from southern Arizona and north-western Mexico, particularly Baja California and Sonora.

== Description ==
Lophocereus schottii grows tree-shaped to shrub-like with yellow-green, more or less upright shoots, which often develop into thickets with more than 100 shoots. It reaches heights of 1 to 3 meters and shoot diameters of 5 to 10 cm (2.0 to 3.9 in). A tribe is rarely formed. There are 4 to 13 clearly defined ribs. The 1 to 3 strong, gray central spines are 1 to 3 cm (0.39 to 1.18 in) long. The 3 to 5 marginal spines are gray and 0.5 to 1.5 cm (0.20 to 0.59 in) long. The terminal pseudocephalium consists of bristly, flexible, gray spines. It occasionally grows to be more than 100 cm (39 in) long.

The funnel-shaped flowers appear laterally from the pseudocephalium and open at night. They are white to deep pink, up to 5 cm (2.0 in) long and reach a diameter of 3 cm (1.2 in). Its pericarpel and flower tube are covered with scales and hairs. The spherical, red fruits contain red pulp and reach a diameter of 1 to 3 cm (0.39 to 1.18 in). They are edible, but are rarely used as food.

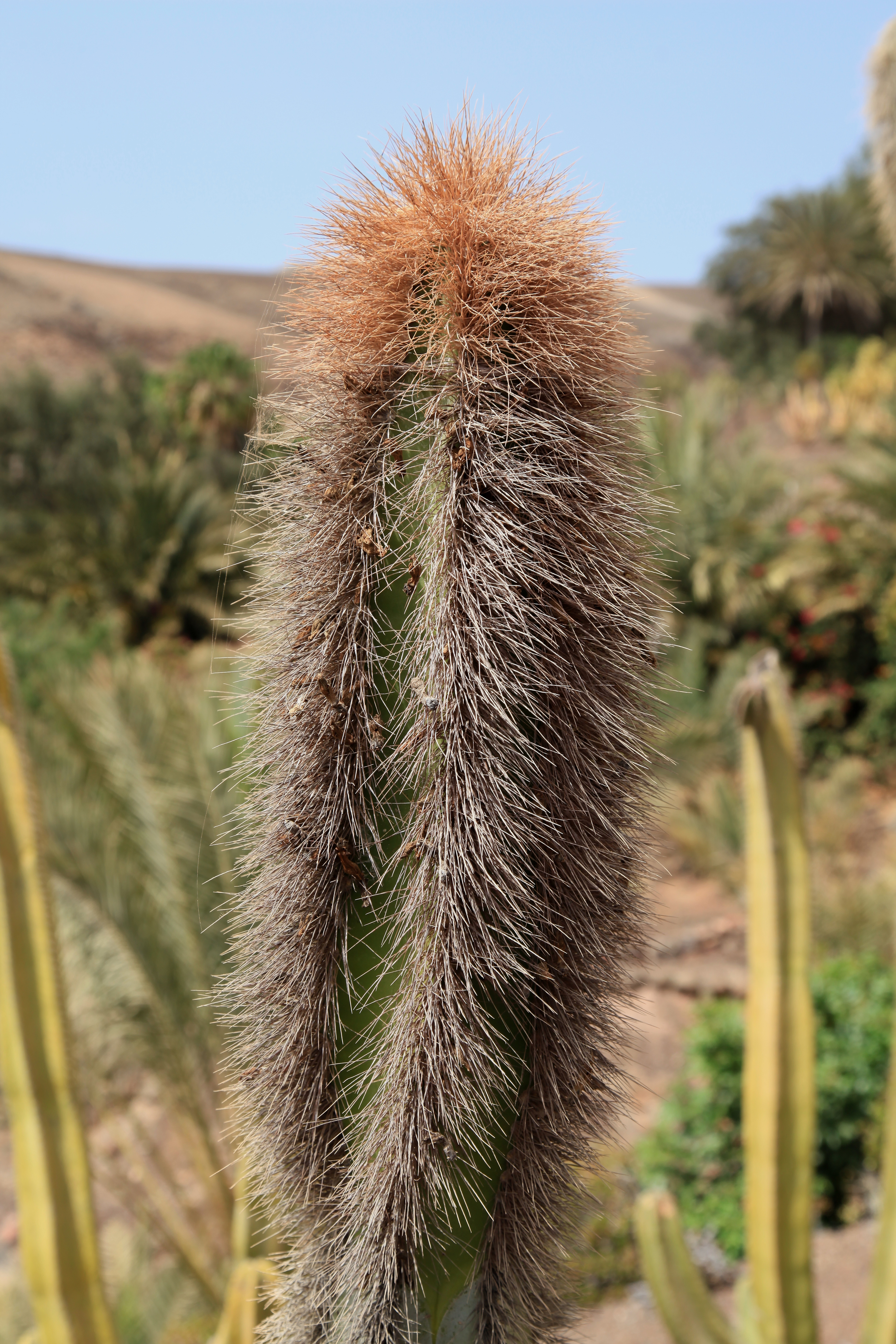
Top of branch

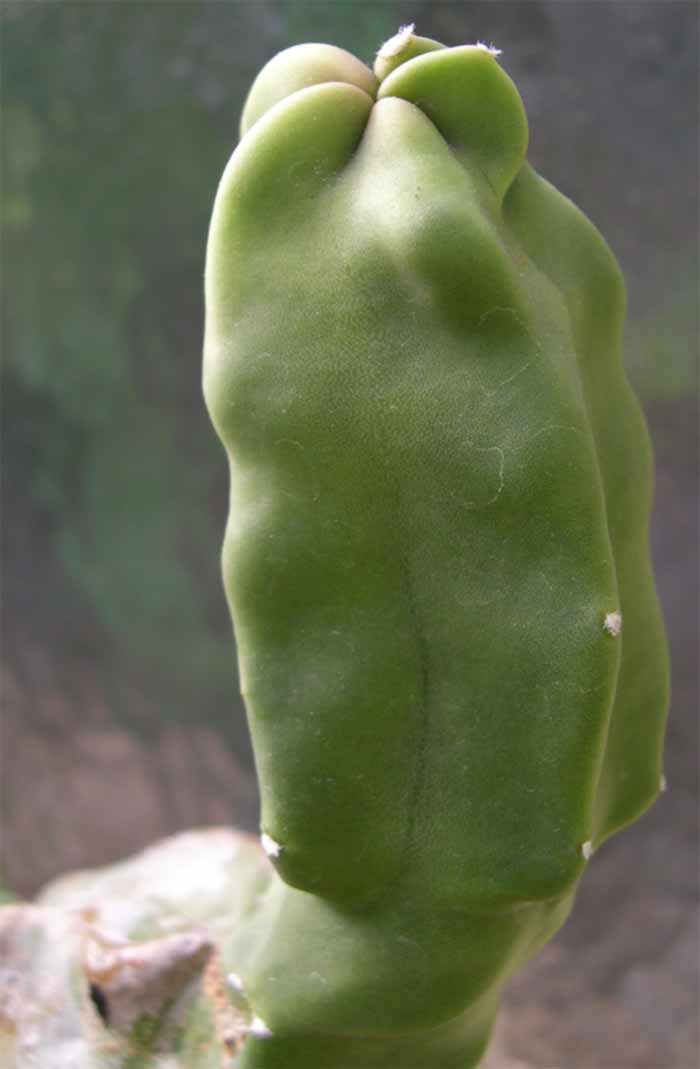
Lophocereus schotti monstrosus

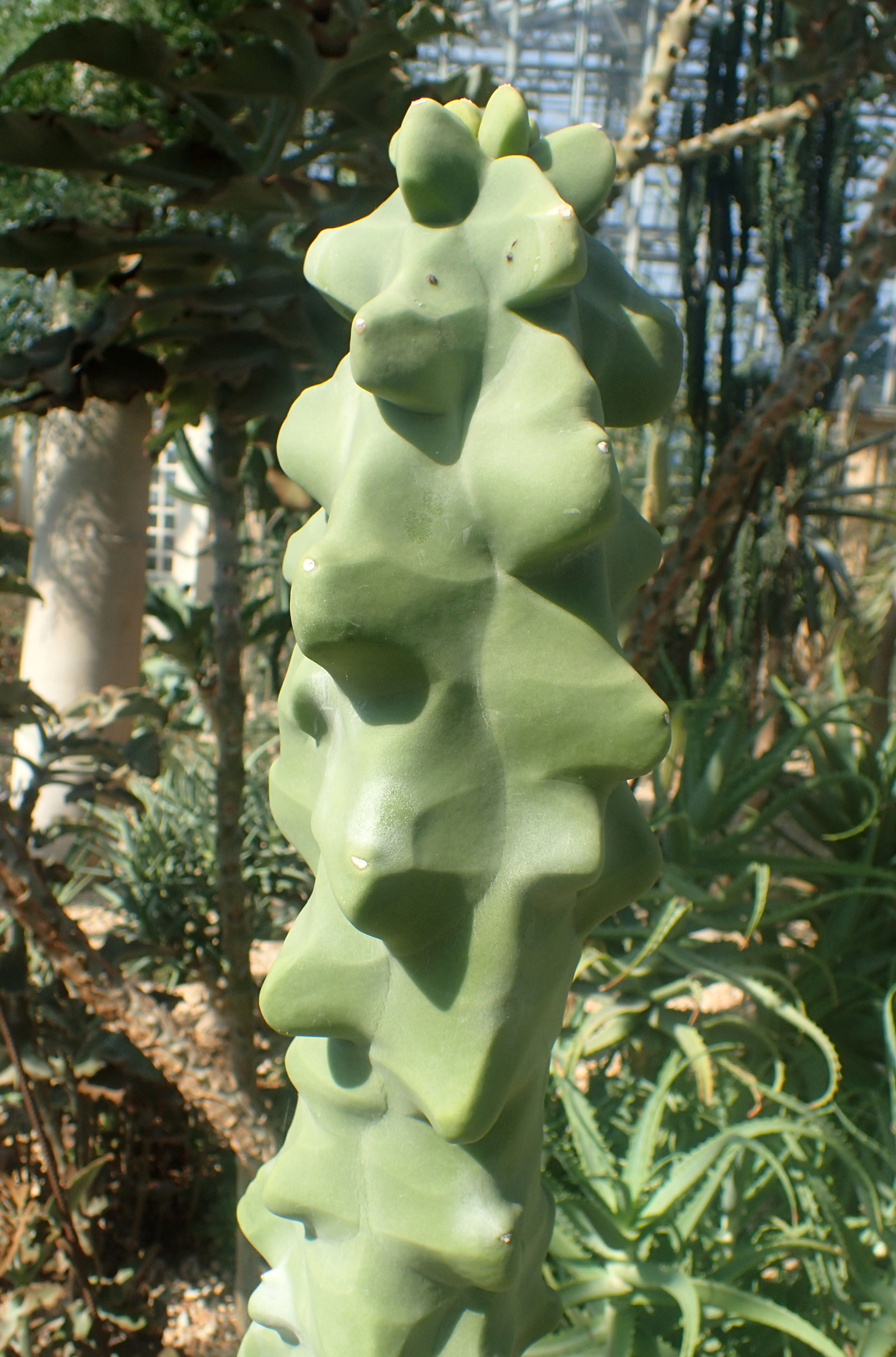
Lophocereus schottii f. monstrosa

== Distribution ==
The distribution area of Lophocereus schottii extends from the south of the US state of Arizona to the northwest of Mexico and includes the states of Baja California and Sonora. The species grows at altitudes from 0 to 800 meters.

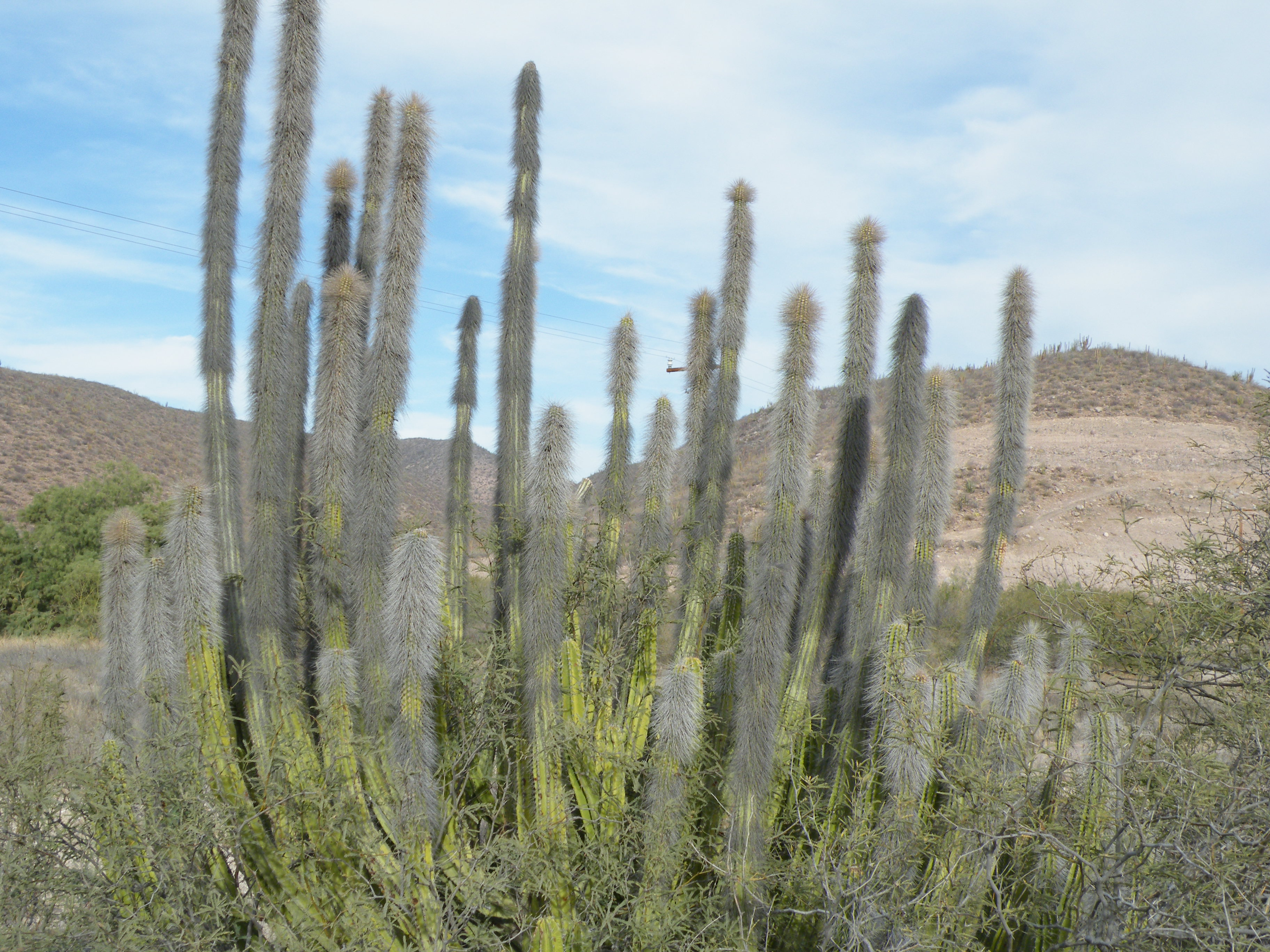
Plants growing in La Paz, Baja California Sur

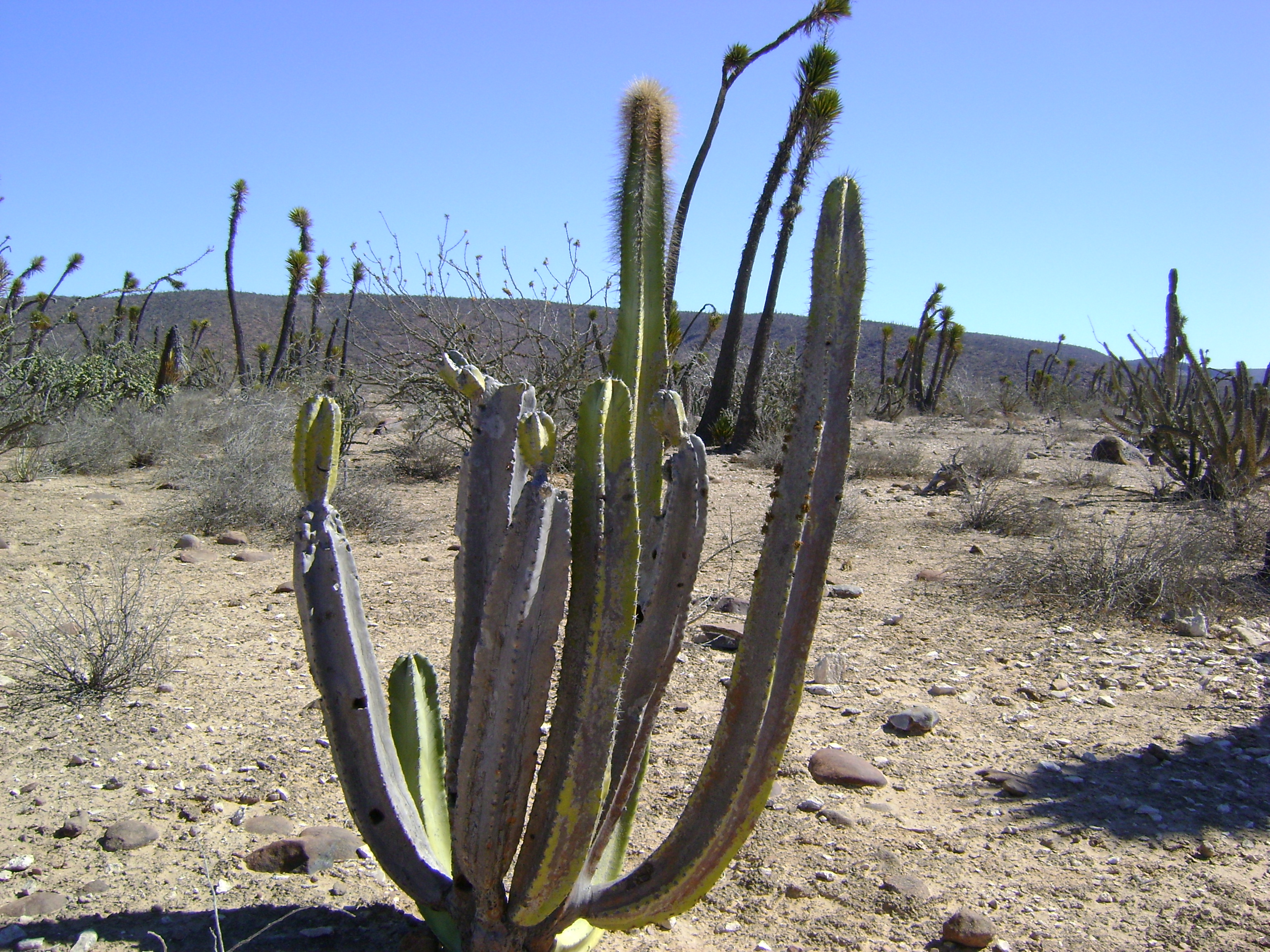
Plant growing in Viscaino, Baja California Sur

== Ecology ==
The senita cactus exhibits mutualism with the senita moth. The senita moth is the only nocturnal pollinator of the cactus, and the moth relies on the cactus as a host for reproduction.

== Phytochemistry ==
Tetrahydroisoquinoline alkaloids were identified; one of them, lophocerine, is a substituted salsolinol, as well as a trimer of lophocerine—pilocereine. Among other compounds, phytosterols such as lophenol, schottenol, lathosterol, spinasterol, locereol, and other compounds. Salsolidine, peyonine, peyophorine and anhalotine were also isolated; among the flavonoids, myricetin, epicatechin, quercetin derivatives, and kaempferol were isolated.

== Taxonomy ==
The first description as Cereus schottii was made in 1856 by George Engelmann. The specific epithet schottii honors the German naturalist and plant collector Arthur Schott, who was involved in surveying the border between the United States and Mexico. Nathaniel Lord Britton and Joseph Nelson Rose placed the species in the genus Lemaireocereus in 1909. Further nomenclature synonyms are Pilocereus schottii (Engelm.) Lem. (1862) and Lophocereus schottii (Engelm.) D.R.Hunt (1987).
