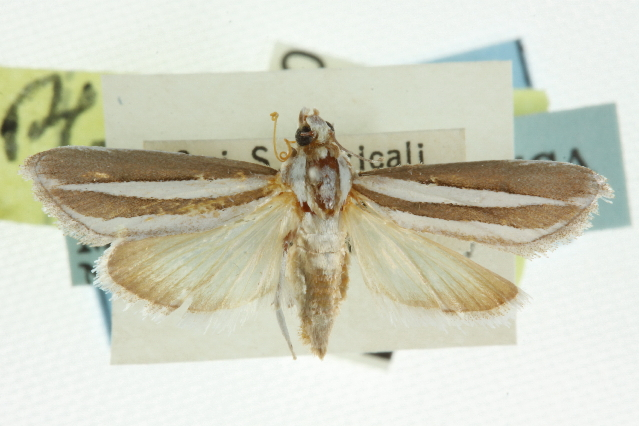

Scientific classification
- Kingdom: Animalia
- Phylum: Arthropoda
- Class: Insecta
- Order: Lepidoptera
- Family: Crambidae
- Subfamily: Glaphyriinae
- Genus: Upiga; Capps, 1964
- Species: U. virescens

Binomial name
- Upiga virescens (Hulst, 1900)

Synonyms
- Eromene virescens Hulst, 1900

= Upiga =

Senita moth

Genus of moths

Upiga is a monotypic moth genus described by Hahn William Capps in 1964. The genus is placed in the family Crambidae, but has also been placed in Pyralidae. It contains only one species, Upiga virescens, the senita moth, described by George Duryea Hulst in 1900 and found in the Sonoran Desert of North America.

The moth is best known for its obligate mutualism with Pachycereus schottii, the senita cactus. The senita moth is one of the few pollinators of the senita cactus, and the moth relies on the cactus as a host for reproduction. Larvae bore into flowers and consume the developing fruit and seeds inside. This obligate mutualism is similar to that of yuccas and yucca moths.

== Description ==
The senita moth is light brown with wide white stripes traversing the body from head to wing tip. It is relatively small, with forewings 7 to 10 mm in length. The abdomen of the female is covered with scales, called the posterior brush, which are used to collect pollen from senita cactus flowers.

== Distribution ==
The senita moth is native to the Sonoran Desert in the US state of Arizona and the Mexican states of Sonora and Baja California.

== Life cycle ==
The life cycle of the senita moth is completely reliant on the moth's host plant, the senita cactus. The senita cactus has an extended flowering season during which several moth generations are completed.

=== Egg ===
Eggs are laid singly on open senita cactus flowers, either on the petals, anthers, or the corolla tube.

=== Larva ===
Larvae can hatch within hours of egg laying, but may take up to three days. First-instar larvae bore into the flowers of the senita cactus towards the developing fruit. This occurs within five to six days, as the corolla becomes impenetrable after this point, blocking larvae access to the fruit. The second instar begins once larvae start eating the developing fruit. Larvae develop into the third instar after they reach eight days of age. They then bore an exit hole through the fruit and, at twelve to seventeen days of age, either pupate or enter diapause, a state of developmental dormancy, to overwinter in the stem of the senita and then emerge in a later flowering season.

Unlike other lepidopterans, whose larvae undergo at least four instars, senita moth larvae have only three instars. This could be due to size limitations, where larvae that continue to grow past the third instar are too large to emerge from exit holes previously created by the larvae, the time constraint of larval growth needing to be completed before fruit matures completely, or possibly to keep the life cycle short so that multiple generations can be completed in a single flowering season.

=== Pupa ===
Pupation takes place in the cactus stem and adults emerge from exit holes created during the previous larval stage.

=== Adult ===
Adult females are the main visitors to flowers. They collect pollen using the posterior brush and actively deposit pollen on stigmas. Additionally, moths may enter the flower for nectar collection. Adults rest on cactus spines during the day. Adults mate on mature cactus spines.

== Larval host plant ==
The senita moth is a host specific, obligate mutualist with the senita cactus, meaning both species rely on each other for survival. Females lay eggs on host plant flowers, and larvae feed off of the developing fruit inside.

=== Oviposition ===
Oviposition takes place on senita cactus flowers, which open after sunset for six to twelve hours, from late March to September. Eggs are laid evenly among flowers, with only one egg laid per flower. Flowers are open for only one night each. Singular oviposition is thought to reduce competition for food resources among larvae as well as reduce the overall risk of larval death from fruit abortion by spreading eggs among several flowers.

By number alone, females oviposit most frequently on petals. However, when accounting for variation in surface area, oviposition occurs more frequently on the anthers and corolla tube. These eggs have a 40% greater survival rate than eggs laid on petals, perhaps due to the shortened distance to the fruit from anthers and the corolla tube or due to the added difficulty of entering the fruit from sticky, wilting petals.

== Survivorship ==
Less than 20% of larvae survive to six days of age. Larval survivorship is reduced by a low egg hatching percentage, corolla-induced mortality, resource-limited fruit abortion, and wasp parasitism. Corolla-induced mortality occurs when larvae are unable to bore through corollas within six days of hatching, after which the corollas become hardened and impenetrable by larvae.

This rate of survivorship is important in maintaining the moth's mutualist relationship with the senita cactus; since the larvae cause fruit abscission and seed destruction, low larval survivorship is necessary for the senita moth's presence to be beneficial to the cactus. Because of the relatively low larval survival rate and the great benefit of the senita moth to pollination and fruit set, the benefits to the senita cactus of interaction with the senita moth are three to four times the cost of seed destruction.

=== Parasitism ===
A significant proportion, 12 to 17%, of moths that survive to pupation are killed by endoparasitic wasps. Endoparasitic wasps oviposit on the body of the host, the larvae killing the host upon hatching.

== Mutualism ==
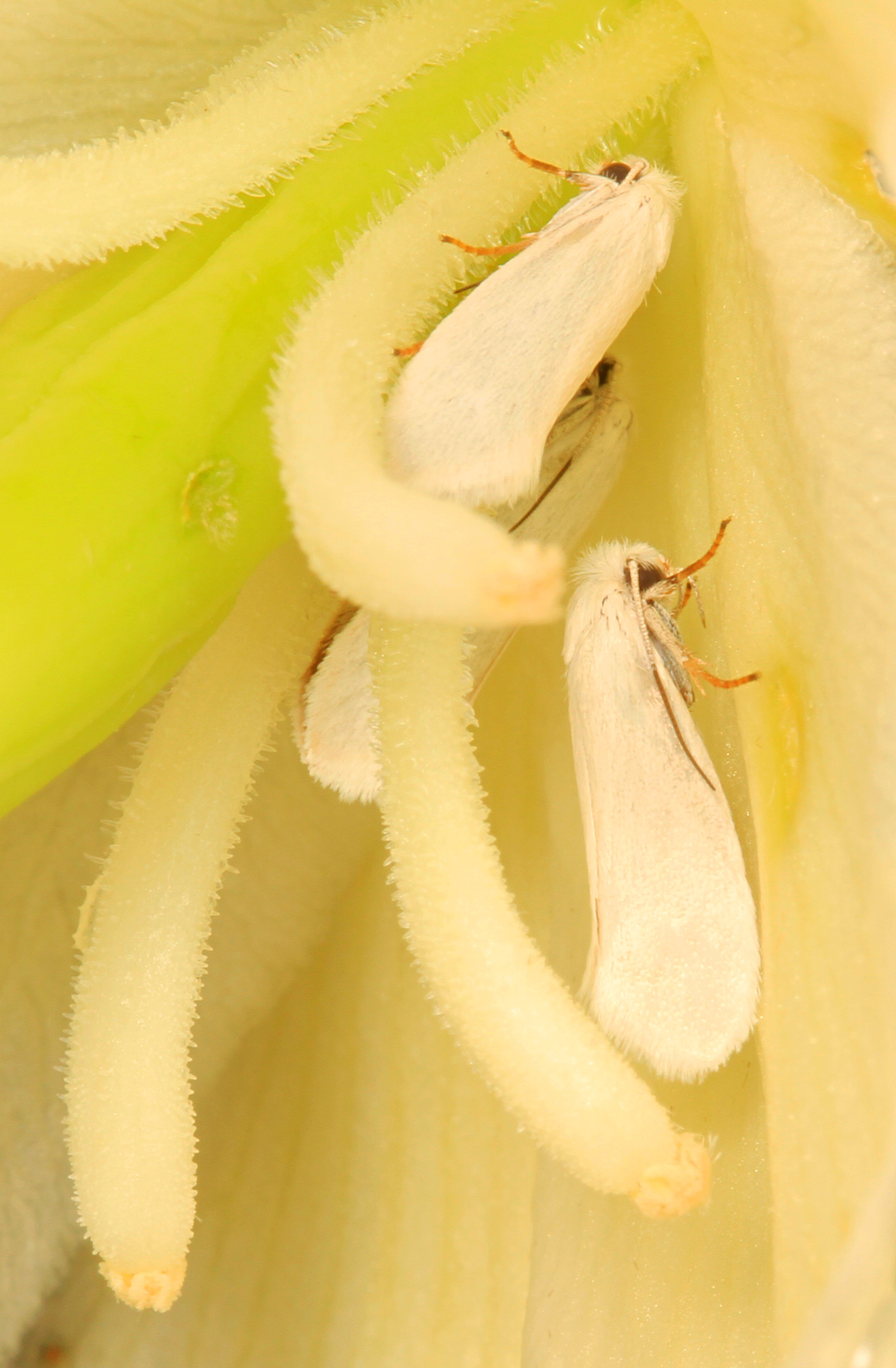
Yucca moths, which exhibit obligate mutualism with the yucca plant similar to the mutualism of the senita moth and senita cactus

The senita moth is an obligate mutualist with the senita cactus. Pollination of the senita cactus is dependent on the senita moth, with 75 to 95% of cactus fruit set resulting from nocturnal pollination by the senita moth. The remaining fruit set is resultant from daytime pollination by co-pollinators. The senita moth is, in turn, reliant on the senita cactus for oviposition and larval food sources.

This mutualistic relationship is present throughout the senita moth's range, which suggests there is strong selective pressure on traits that maintain mutualism.

=== Coevolution ===
Several traits of the senita cactus allowed for the coevolution of mutualism with the senita moth. The first is nocturnal flower opening, which favors interactions with the cactus's only nocturnal pollinator, the senita moth. The second trait is self-incompatibility of the host plant, which leads to a reliance on pollinators for reproduction. The third trait is resource-limited fruit production with a reduction in nectar production. Reduced nectar production suggests a lessened need to attract pollinators, as would be the case in obligate mutualism where pollinators rely on the host plant for reproduction.

=== Comparison to other obligate pollinators ===
The senita moth is the sixth known example of pollination with seed consumption, and the third known example of obligate pollination with seed consumption. Senita cactus and senita moth mutualism is similar to the mutualism seen with figs and fig wasps and yuccas and yucca moths. The senita moth's mutualism is unique in that it is not the sole pollinator of its host plant; the senita cactus is pollinated by a few species of bees in addition to the senita moth. This is atypical of specialized, obligate mutualism, and could suggest that the senita cactus is in an evolutionary transition state from a general mutualism with co-pollinators to a complete reliance on the senita moth for pollination.
