= Peyonine =

Names
- Systematic IUPAC name 1-[2-(3,4,5-Trimethoxyphenyl)ethyl]-1H-pyrrole-2-carboxylic acid

Identifiers
CAS Number	19717-25-0
3D model (JSmol)	Interactive image
ChemSpider	523536
PubChem CID	602258
UNII	KWD7M7UMPY
CompTox Dashboard (EPA)	DTXSID60345161
- InChI: InChI=1S/C16H19NO5/c1-20-13-9-11(10-14(21-2)15(13)22-3)6-8-17-7-4-5-12(17)16(18)19/h4-5,7,9-10H,6,8H2,1-3H3,(H,18,19) Key: DDYNENGLSGKEPO-UHFFFAOYSA-N; InChI=1/C16H19NO5/c1-20-13-9-11(10-14(21-2)15(13)22-3)6-8-17-7-4-5-12(17)16(18)19/h4-5,7,9-10H,6,8H2,1-3H3,(H,18,19) Key: DDYNENGLSGKEPO-UHFFFAOYAP
- SMILES: COc1cc(cc(c1OC)OC)CCn2cccc2C(=O)O

Properties
Chemical formula	C_{16}H_{19}NO_{5}
Molar mass	305.326
- Except where otherwise noted, data are given for materials in their standard state (at 25 °C [77 °F], 100 kPa). Infobox references

Peyonine is a β-phenethylpyrrole made by Lophophora.
