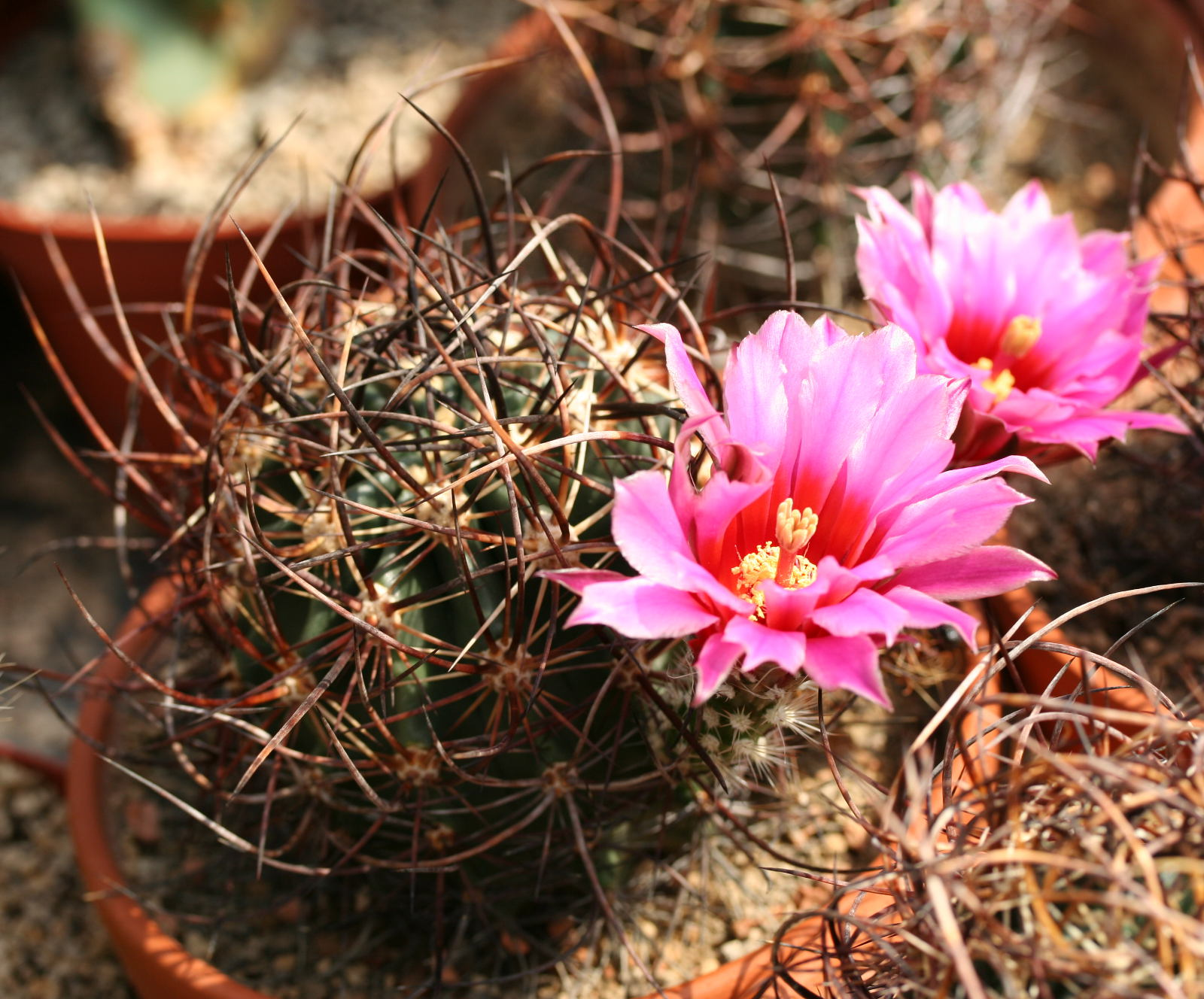

Conservation status
- Least Concern (IUCN 3.1)

Scientific classification
- Kingdom: Plantae
- Clade: Tracheophytes
- Clade: Angiosperms
- Clade: Eudicots
- Order: Caryophyllales
- Family: Cactaceae
- Subfamily: Cactoideae
- Genus: Echinocereus
- Species: E. ferreirianus

Binomial name
- Echinocereus ferreirianus H.E.Gates

= Echinocereus ferreirianus =

Species of flowering plant

Echinocereus ferreirianus is a species of cactus native to Mexico.

== Description ==
Echinocereus ferreirianus can grow solitary or branched, forming small groups. Its green to gray-green spherical to cylindrical shoots reach up to 40 cm (16 in) in height and 4 to 10 cm (1.6 to 3.9 in) in diameter, almost entirely covered by thorns. The four to seven round, often curved central spines start red and turn dark or gray, measuring 1.5 to 10 cm (0.59 to 3.94 in) long. The eight to 14 whitish radial spines are 0.8 to 4.5 cm (0.31 to 1.77 in) long.

The funnel-shaped flowers, light to deep purple-pink with a dark orange to red throat, appear near the tips of the shoots. They are 6 to 10 cm (2.4 to 3.9 in) long and 4 to 9.5 cm (1.6 to 3.7 in) in diameter.

== Subspecies ==
There are two recognized subspecies:

Image	Scientific name	Distribution
	Echinocereus ferreirianus subsp. ferreirianus	Mexico (C. Baja California)
	Echinocereus ferreirianus subsp. lindsayorum (J.Meyrán) N.P.Taylor	Mexico (C. Baja California)

== Distribution ==
Echinocereus ferreirianus is found in Mexico on the Baja California peninsula growing on loam and pumice slopes.

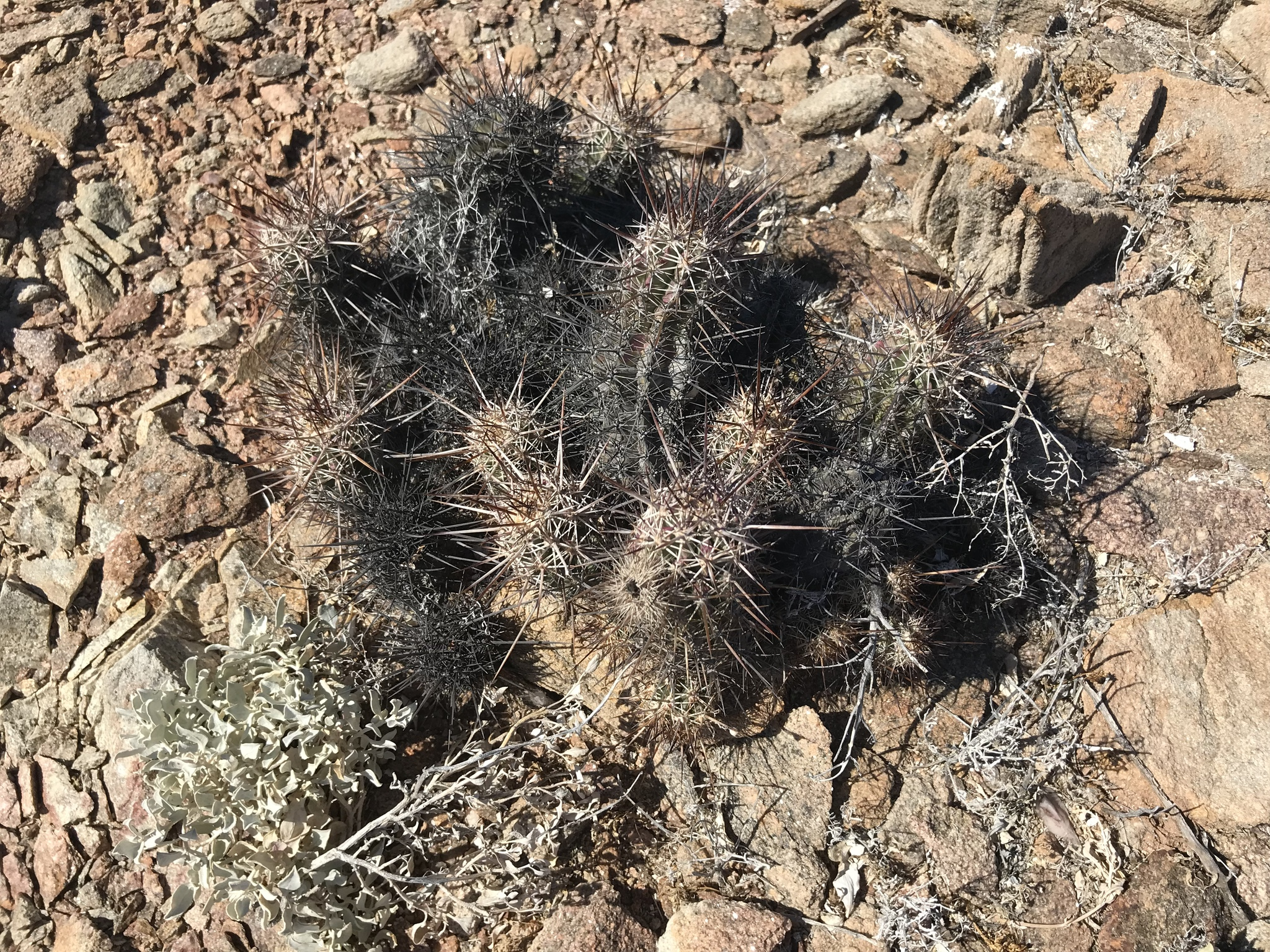
Plant growing in Ensenada, Baja California

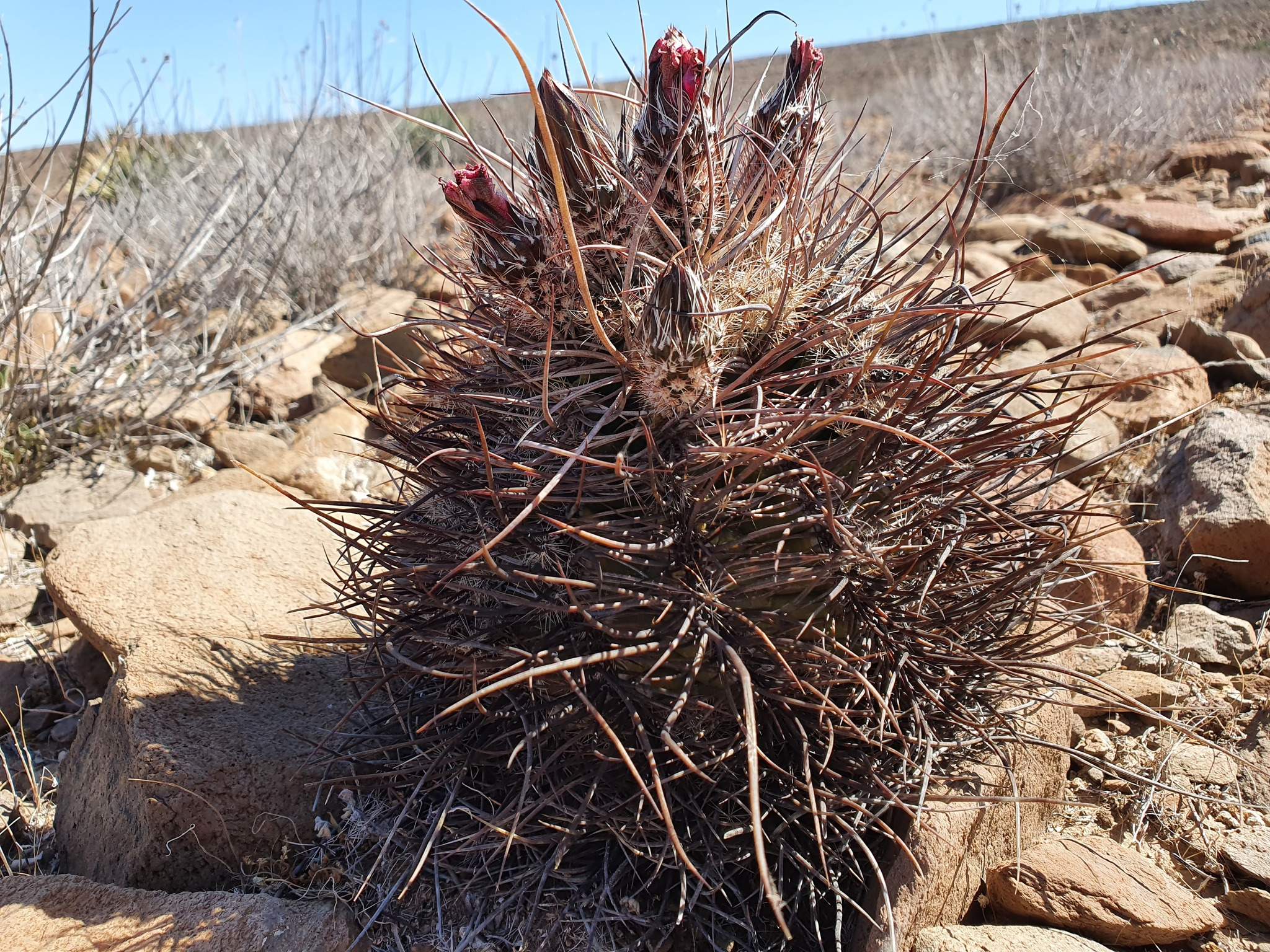
Plant blooming in Ensenada, Baja California

== Taxonomy ==
First described in 1953 by Howard Elliott Gates, the species epithet ferreirianus honors Enrique Ferreira, the Mexican consul from San Diego, California.
