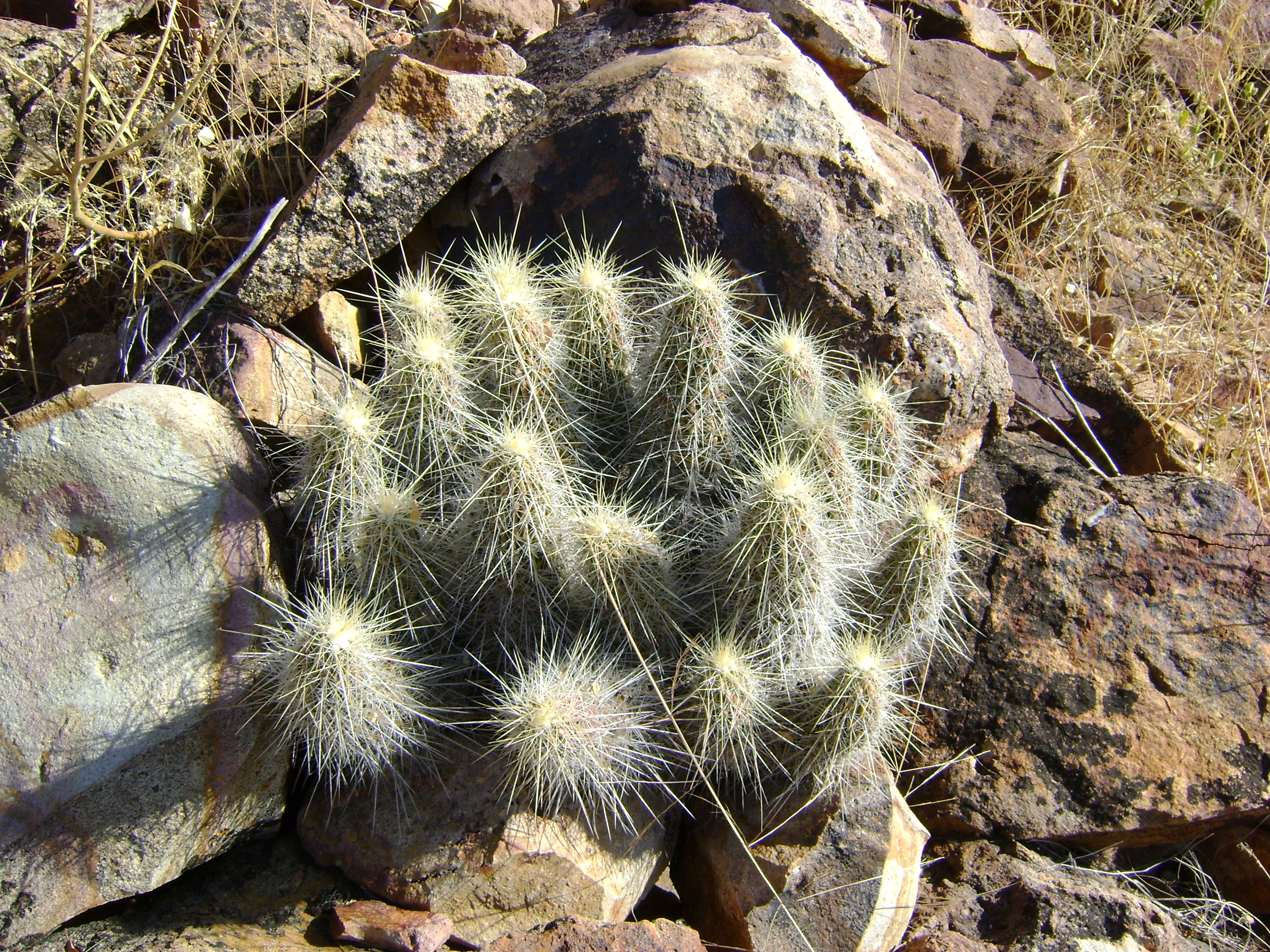

Conservation status
- Data Deficient (IUCN 3.1)

Scientific classification
- Kingdom: Plantae
- Clade: Tracheophytes
- Clade: Angiosperms
- Clade: Eudicots
- Order: Caryophyllales
- Family: Cactaceae
- Subfamily: Cactoideae
- Genus: Echinocereus
- Species: E. schereri

Binomial name
- Echinocereus schereri G.Frank 1990

= Echinocereus schereri =

Species of cactus

Echinocereus schereri is a species of cactus native to Mexico.

== Description ==
Echinocereus schereri typically grows solitary with gray-green cylindrical shoots up to 22 cm (8.7 in) long and 10 cm (3.9 in) in diameter. It has 12 to 18 tuberous ribs and no central spines. There are 21 to 24 comb-like radial spines, slightly pink to brownish with darker tips, measuring 0.6 to 1.2 cm (0.24 to 0.47 in) long. The flowers are funnel-shaped and reddish-purple, appearing near the shoot tips. They are 8 to 9 cm (3.1 to 3.5 in) long and 8 to 11 cm (3.1 to 4.3 in) in diameter. The fruits are spherical to egg-shaped, starting green and turning brown.

== Distribution ==
Echinocereus schereri is found growing in the rocky slopes and shrub-land in Sonora ( Sierra de Alamos, San Antonio, Arroyo Gochico, Rio Cuchujaqui, upper Rio Cuchujaqui, E of Maicoba), Chihuahua ( Sierra Charuco), and Durango, México, at elevations between 350 and 1800 meters. Plants are found along with Cochemiea grahamii, Mammillaria standleyi, Mammillaria marksiana, Mammillaria mercadensis, Mammillaria standleyi, and Echinocereus subinermis.

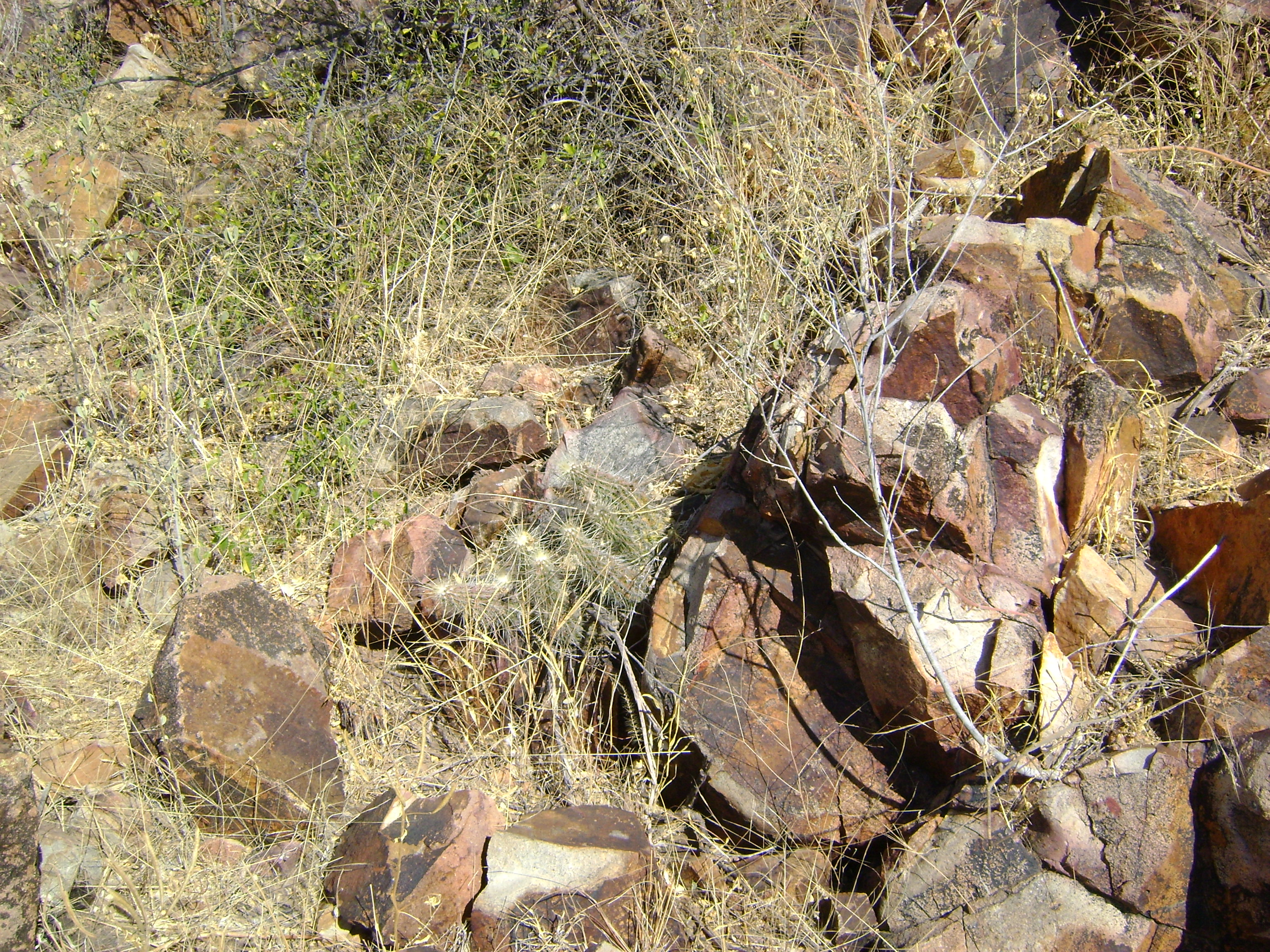
Plants growing in Rio Nazas, Durango

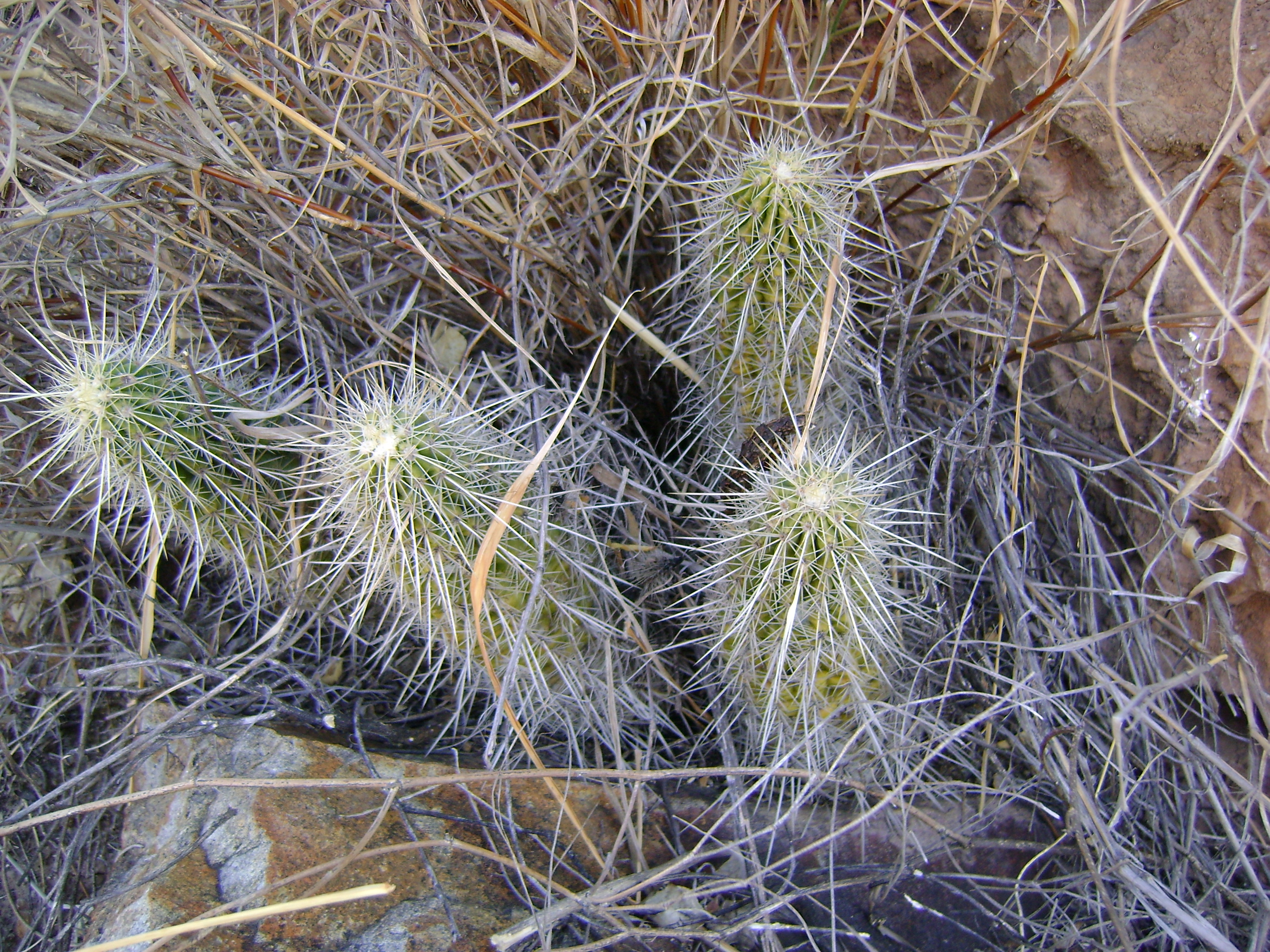

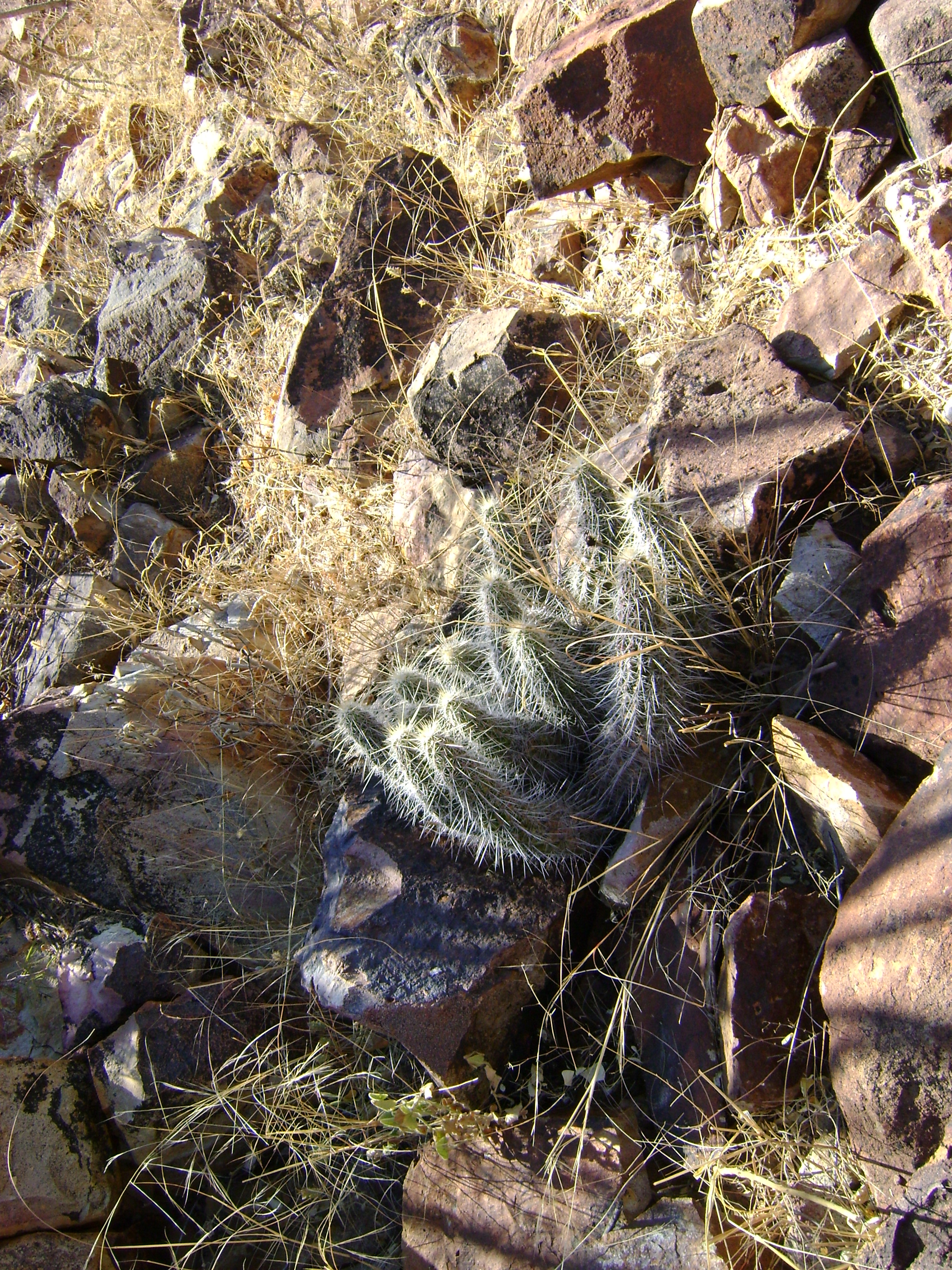

== Taxonomy ==
It was first described by Gerhard R. W. Frank in 1990. The species is named in honor of German cactus collector Egon Scherer.
