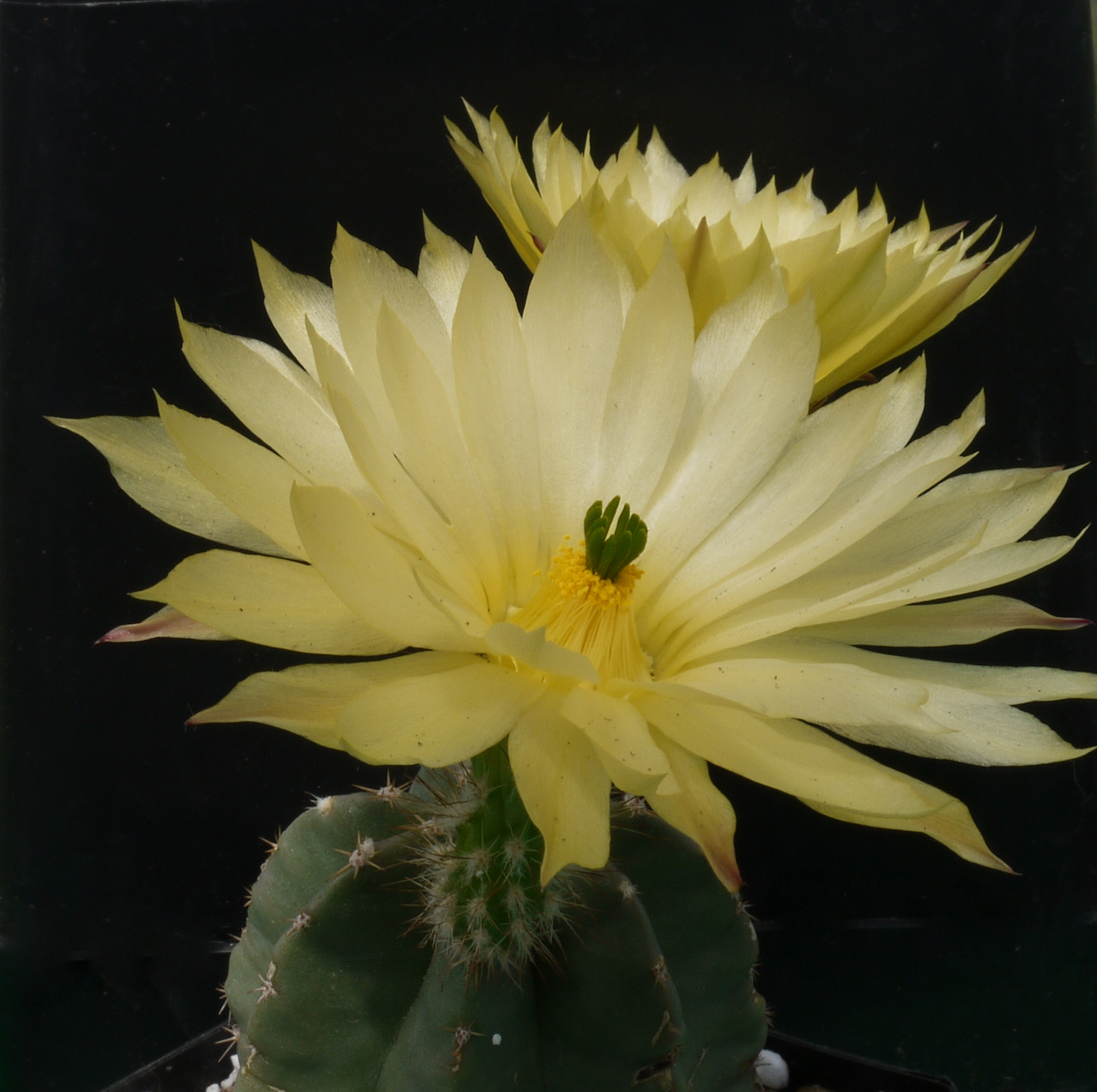

Scientific classification
- Kingdom: Plantae
- Clade: Tracheophytes
- Clade: Angiosperms
- Clade: Eudicots
- Order: Caryophyllales
- Family: Cactaceae
- Subfamily: Cactoideae
- Genus: Echinocereus
- Species: E. subinermis

Binomial name
- Echinocereus subinermis Salm-Dyck ex Scheer

= Echinocereus subinermis =

Species of cactus

Echinocereus subinermis is a species of flowering plant in the cactus family Cactaceae, native to north, northwestern, and central Mexico.

== Description ==
Echinocereus subinermis grows either solitary or branching, often forming groups of up to 10 shoots. The stem is a ball with gray-green to reddish, 5 to 11 prominent ribs, growing to a cylinder or cone 4–33 cm (2–13 in) 4 to 15 tall and wide, and producing yellow flowers 8 cm (3 in) long in early summer. There are up to four central spines, which may be light or dark and are 0.1 to 2 centimeters long, although they can also be absent. The plant may also have up to ten slender, light yellow to gray marginal spines that are 0.1 to 3 centimeters long, but these too can be absent. The flowers are funnel-shaped, fragrant, and bright yellow, appearing near the shoot tips. They are 7 to 10 centimeters long and 5 to 13 centimeters in diameter. The gray-green, obovate fruits are thorny, contain white pulp, and split lengthwise when ripe.

=== Subspecies ===
Accepted subspecies:

Image	Scientific name	Distribution
	Echinocereus subinermis subsp. subinermis	Mexico (Sonora, Sinaloa, SW. Chihuahua, Durango)
	Echinocereus subinermis subsp. ochoterenae (J.G.Ortega) N.P.Taylor	Mexico (S. Sinaloa)

== Distribution ==
Echinocereus subinermis is found growing on rocky slopes in the deciduous oak forest of the Mexican states of Sonora, Sinaloa, Chihuahua, and Durango, in the western Sierra Madre Occidental at elevations between 200 and 1300 meters. Plants are found growing along with Mammillaria standleyi, Cochemiea grahamii, Mammillaria marksiana, Echinocereus scheeri, Ferocactus schwarzii, Ferocactus alamosanus, Opuntia decumbens, Pachycereus pecten-aboriginum, Bursera laxiflora, Sabal mexicana, Agave vilmoriniana, Agave bovicornuta and Agave guadalajarana.

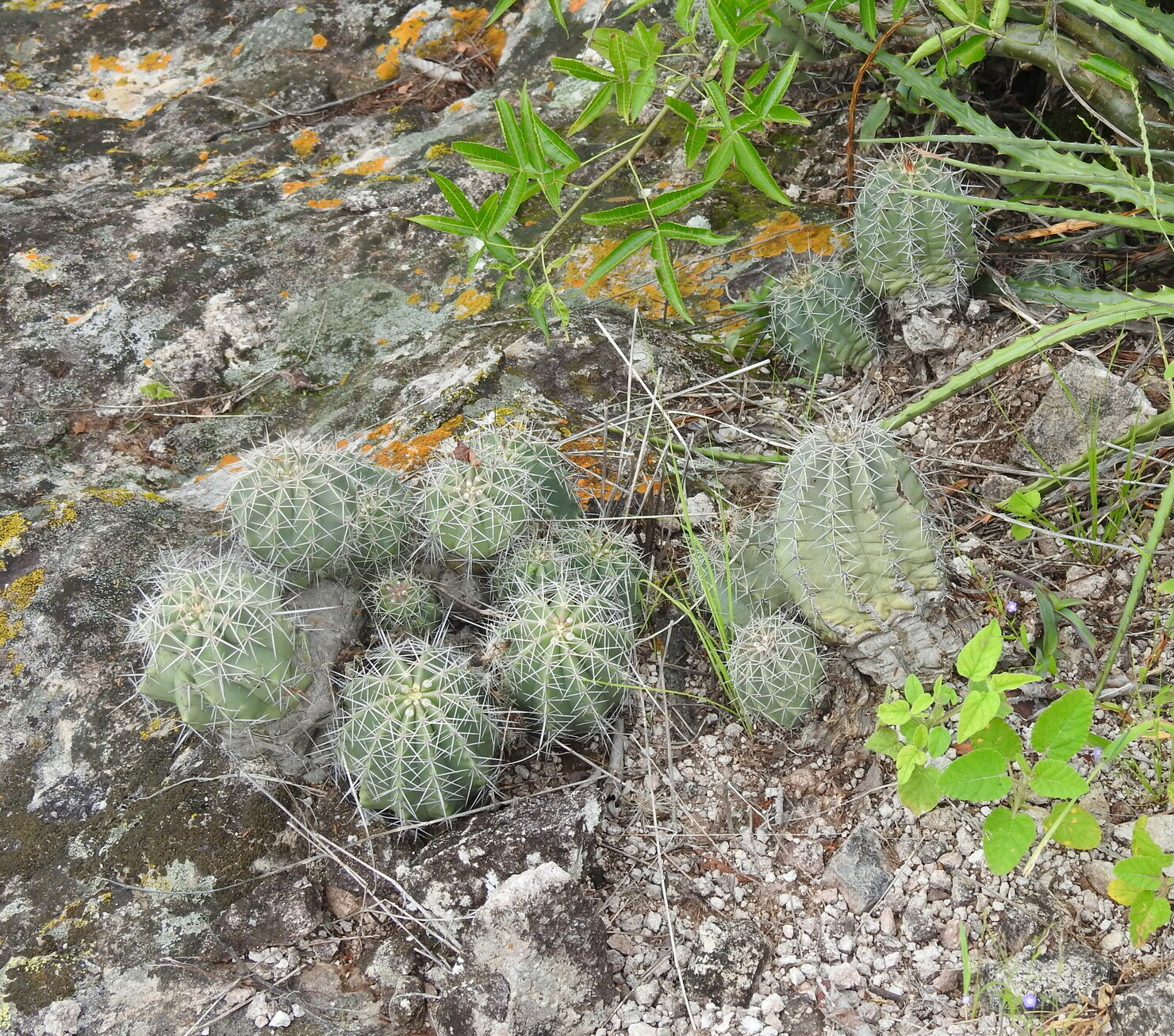
Echinocereus subinermis ochoterenae growing in Campanilla, Sinaloa, Mexico

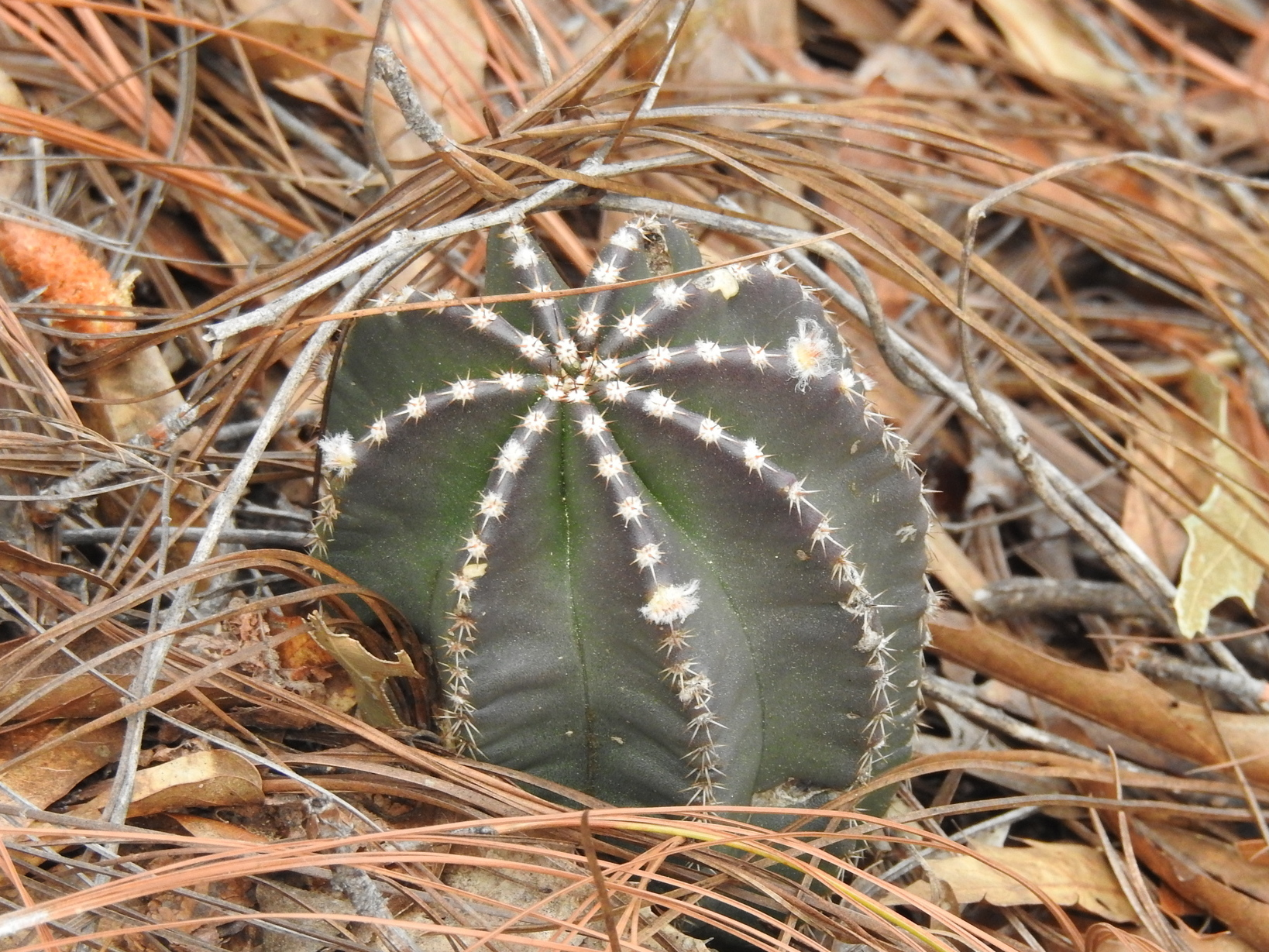
Echinocereus subinermis subinermis habitat in Bacacoragua, Sinaloa, Mexico

== Taxonomy ==
First described by Frederick Scheer in 1856, the specific epithet "subinermis" comes from the Latin words "sub-" meaning 'almost' or 'more or less,' and "inermis," meaning 'unarmored,' referring to the species' short thorns.

== Cultivation ==
In cultivation in temperate regions it requires the protection of glass with heat. It has gained the Royal Horticultural Society's Award of Garden Merit.
