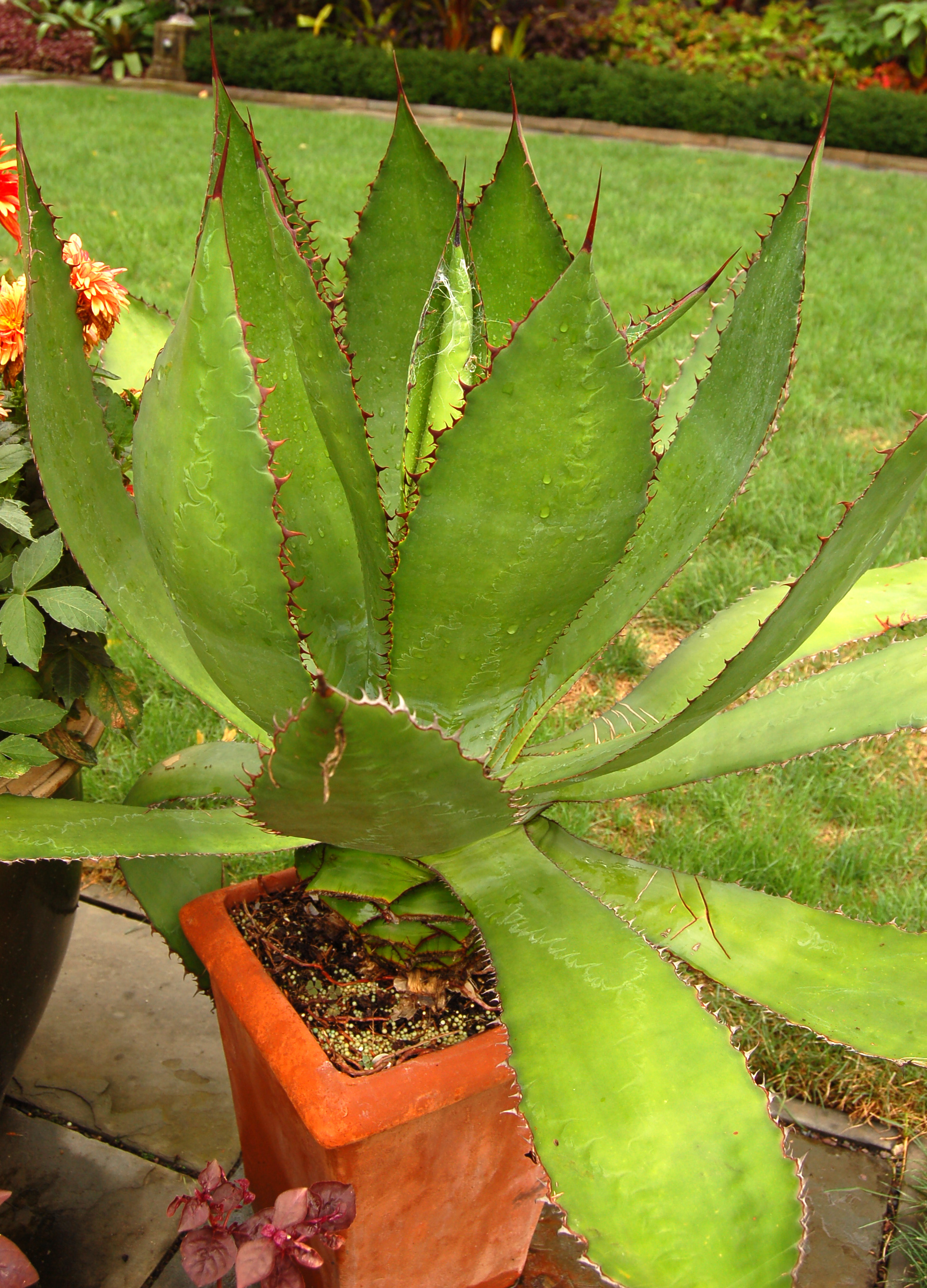

Conservation status
- Vulnerable (IUCN 3.1)

Scientific classification
- Kingdom: Plantae
- Clade: Tracheophytes
- Clade: Angiosperms
- Clade: Monocots
- Order: Asparagales
- Family: Asparagaceae
- Subfamily: Agavoideae
- Genus: Agave
- Species: A. bovicornuta

Binomial name
- Agave bovicornuta H. S. Gentry

= Agave bovicornuta =

Cowhorn Agave

Species of flowering plant

Agave bovicornuta Gentry, is a plant in the genus Agave, native to mountainous regions in the Mexican states of Chihuahua, Sonora and Sinaloa. The common name Cowhorn Agave and the specific epithet refer to the prominent red spines along the edges of the leaves. Other common names include "lechguilla verde"

The plant forms a solitary rosette with no suckers. Yellowish-green flowers are borne on a stalk up to 150 cm tall. The Tarahumara peoples who live in the region where the plant is found sometimes eat the leaves although they consider it inferior to other species.

It is listed as Vulnerable by the IUCN. Although it encompasses a wide range, its populations are small and isolated, and vulnerable to overcollection and consumption as food.

== Gallery ==
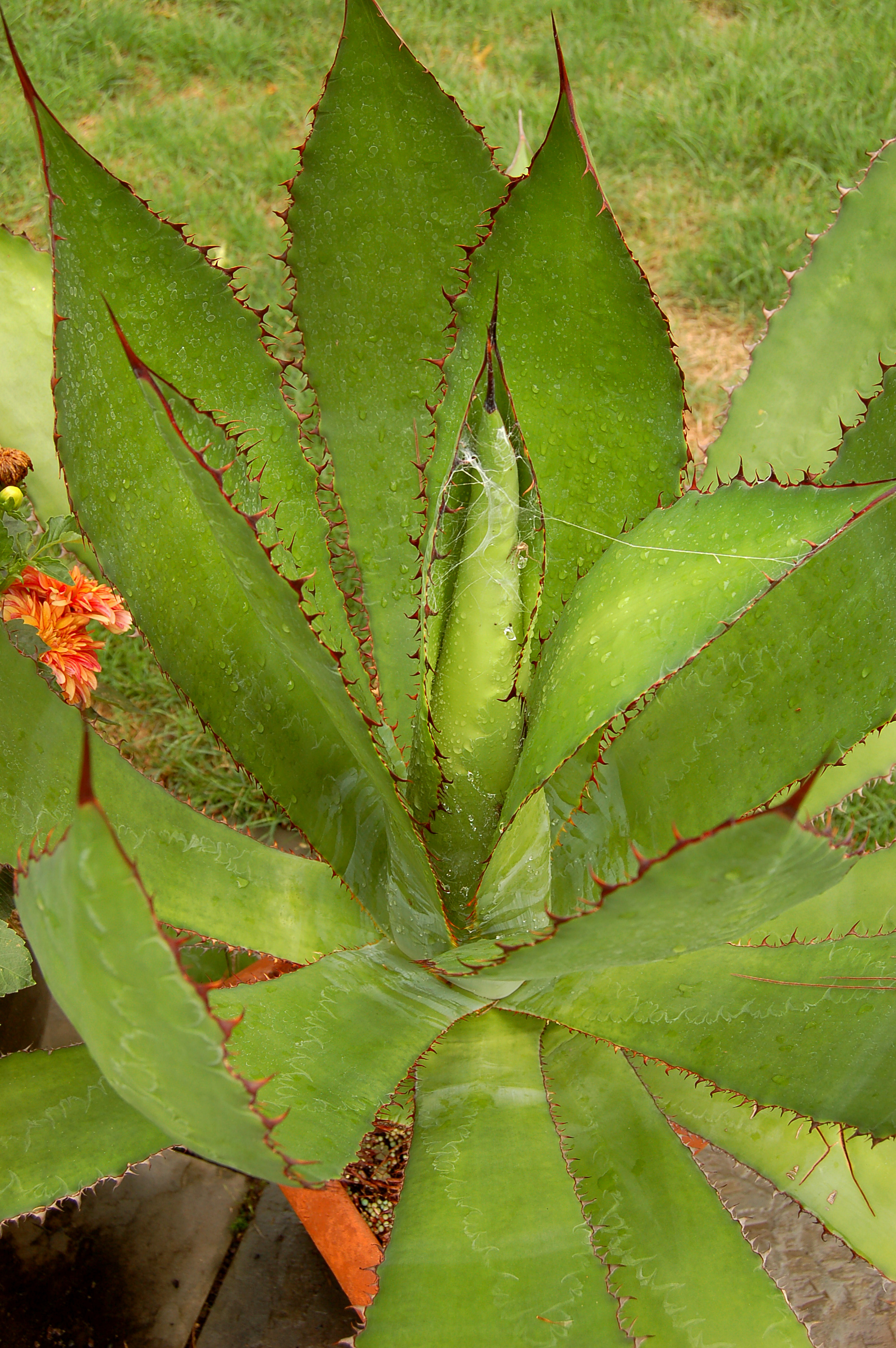
Cowhorn Agave plant in a pot

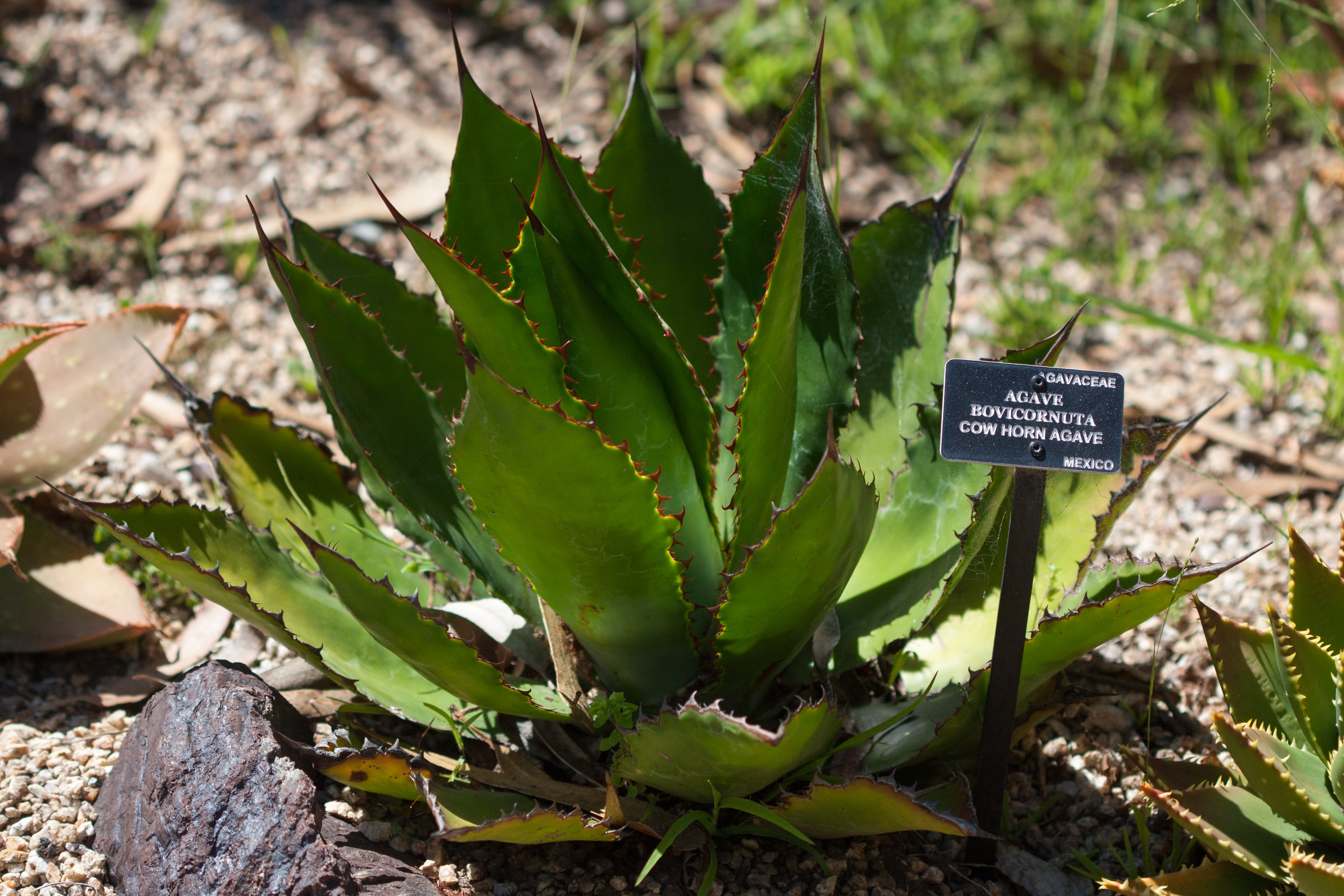
Agave bovicornuta in the San Francisco Botanical Garden
