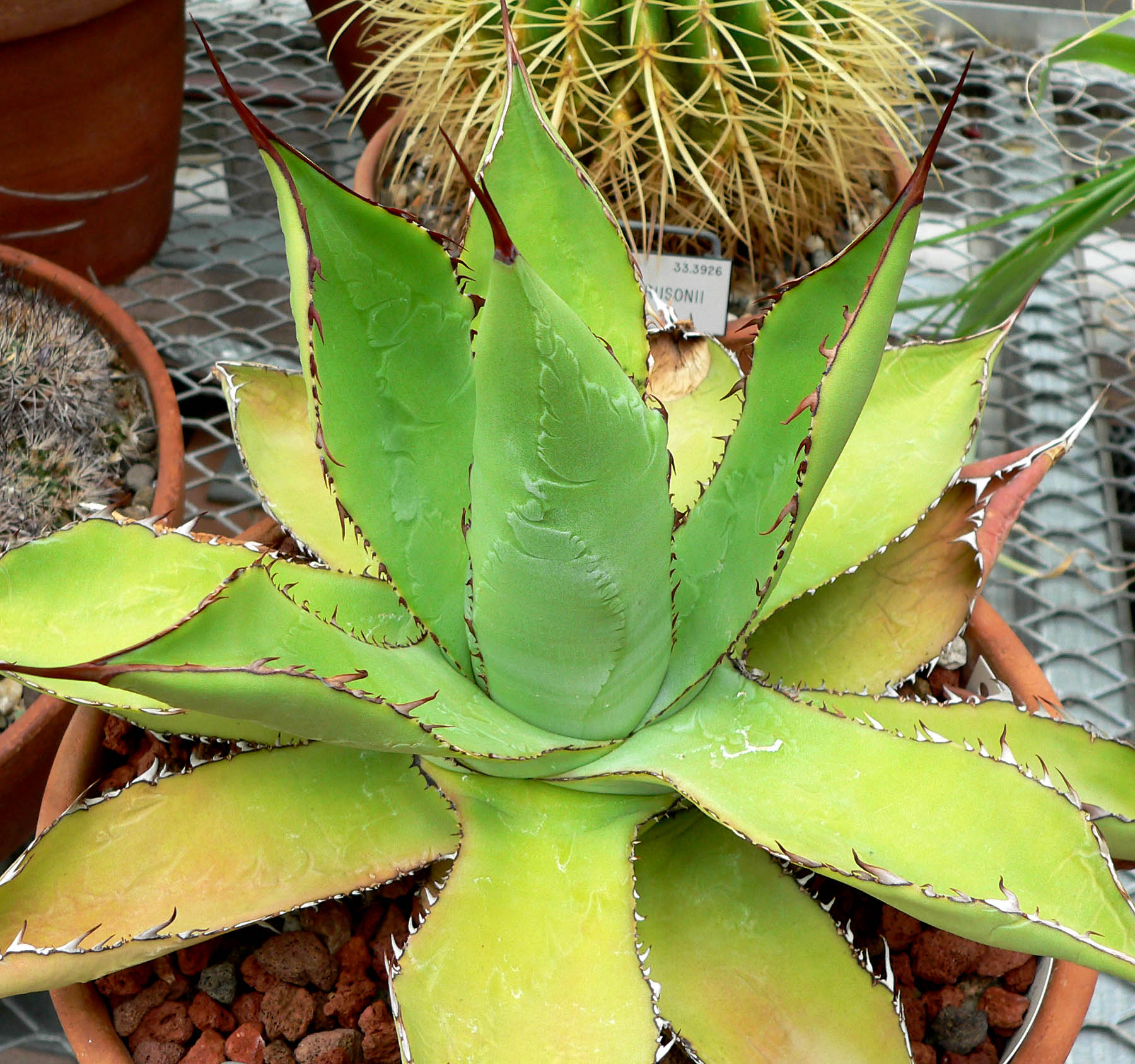

Conservation status
- Endangered (IUCN 3.1)

Scientific classification
- Kingdom: Plantae
- Clade: Tracheophytes
- Clade: Angiosperms
- Clade: Monocots
- Order: Asparagales
- Family: Asparagaceae
- Subfamily: Agavoideae
- Genus: Agave
- Species: A. guadalajarana

Binomial name
- Agave guadalajarana Trel.

= Agave guadalajarana =

Species of flowering plant

Agave guadalajarana is a smallish Agave species endemic to Mexico. It is native to the Guadalajara region of Jalisco state, and the Ceboruco volcano area of Nayarit state.

== Description ==
About 1–2 feet (0.3–0.6 m) in diameter, A. guadalajarana grows as a basal rosette of grey-green leaves with distinctive overlapment marks. The edges of the leaves have big spines and they end each in a thick brown spine.

The flower spike is up to 13 ft (4.0 m) tall.

The species is often confused with a similar species, Agave inaequidens.

== Cultivation ==
Agave guadalajarana is cultivated as an ornamental plant. Easy to grow, it is best propagated by seed directly into the intended soil for the adult plant.

Multiple fertilizations is good during vegetation and the plant is best grown in a decently sized container.
