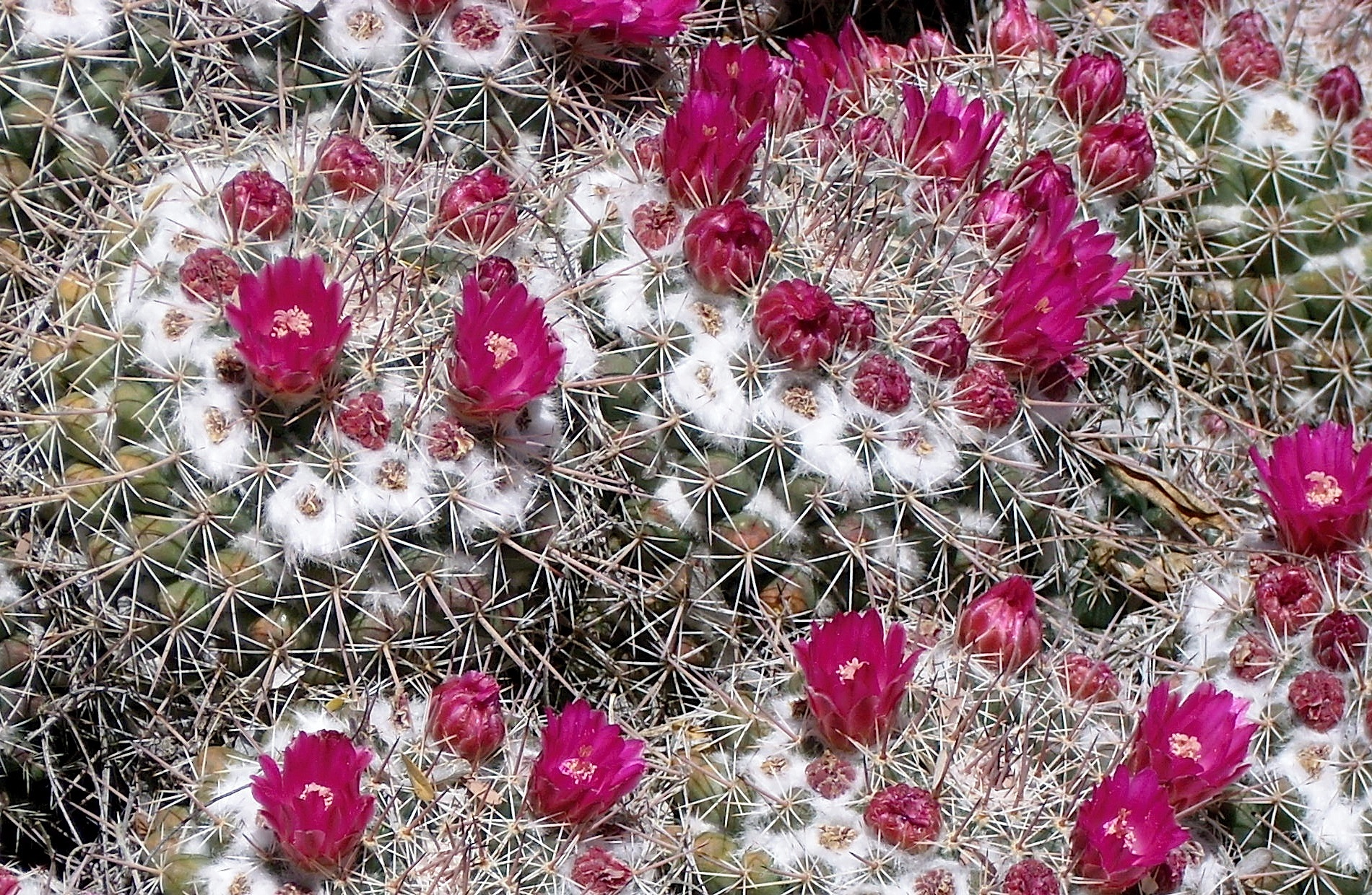

Scientific classification
- Kingdom: Plantae
- Clade: Tracheophytes
- Clade: Angiosperms
- Clade: Eudicots
- Order: Caryophyllales
- Family: Cactaceae
- Subfamily: Cactoideae
- Genus: Mammillaria
- Species: M. standleyi

Binomial name
- Mammillaria standleyi (Britt. & Rose) Orcutt

Synonyms
- Mammillaria auricantha R.T. Craig; Mammillaria canelensis R.T. Craig; Mammillaria craigii G.E. Linds.; Mammillaria sonorensis R.T. Craig; Mammillaria tesopacensis Craig; Neomammillaria standleyi Britton & Rose; Neomammillaria xanthina Britton & Rose

= Mammillaria standleyi =

Species of cactus

Mammillaria standleyi is a species of the family Cactaceae native to the Sierra Madre Occidental of Sinaloa, Chihuahua and Sonora. It has red-purple flowers surrounded by cottony pubescence. Fruits are red and edible, tasting like apples, although too small to be of much food value to humans.

== Synonyms ==
- Mammillaria standleyi (Britt. & Rose) Orcutt, Cactography 8. 1926
  - Neomammillaria standleyi Britt. & Rose, Cact. 4: 97. 1923.
  - Mammillaria auricantha R.T. Craig, Mammill. Handbook 301, fig. 272. 1945.
  - Mammillaria auritricha R.T. Craig, Mammill. Handbook 302, fig. 273. 1945
  - Mammillaria laneusumma R.T. Craig, Mammill. Handbook 310, fig. 282. 1945
  - Mammillaria mayensis R.T. Craig, Mammill. Handbook 116, fig. 97. 1945
  - Mammillaria montensis R.T. Craig, Mammill. Handbook 311, fig. 284. 1945.
  - Mammillaria craigii G.E. Linds., Cact. Succ. J. (Los Angeles) 303. 1942.
  - Mammillaria sonorensis Craig, Cact. Succ. J. (US) 12(10): 155. 1940.
  - Mammillaria sonorensis var brevispina Craig, Cact. Succ. J. (Los Angeles) 12: 156, fig 1940
  - Mammillaria sonorensis var gentryi Craig, Cact. Succ. J. (Los Angeles) 12: 156, fig 1940
  - Mammillaria sonorensis var hiltonii Craig, Cact. Succ. J. (Los Angeles) 12: 156, fig 1940
  - Mammillaria sonorensis var longispina Craig, Cact. Succ. J. (Los Angeles) 12: 156, fig 1940
  - Mammillaria sonorensis var maccartyi Craig, Cact. Succ. J. (Los Angeles) 12: 156, fig 1940
  - Mammillaria tesopacensis Craig, Mammill. Handbook 104, fig. 86. 1945
  - Mammillaria xanthina (Britton & Rose) Boed., Mammillarien-Vergleichs-Schluessel 47. 1933.
  - Neomammillaria xanthina Britton & Rose, Cactaceae (Britton & Rose) 4: 164. 1923
  - Chilita xanthina (Britton & Rose) Orcutt, Cactography 2. 1926.
  - Mammillaria bellisiana Craig, Mammill. Handb. 304 (1945)
  - Mammillaria movensis Craig, Mammill. Handb. 312, fig. 285 1945
  - Mammillaria tinuvieliae Laferr., J. Mammillaria Soc. 38(2): 21, fig. 1998
  - Mammillaria floresii Fritz Schwarz, Blätt. Sukkulentenk. 1: 5. 1949.
