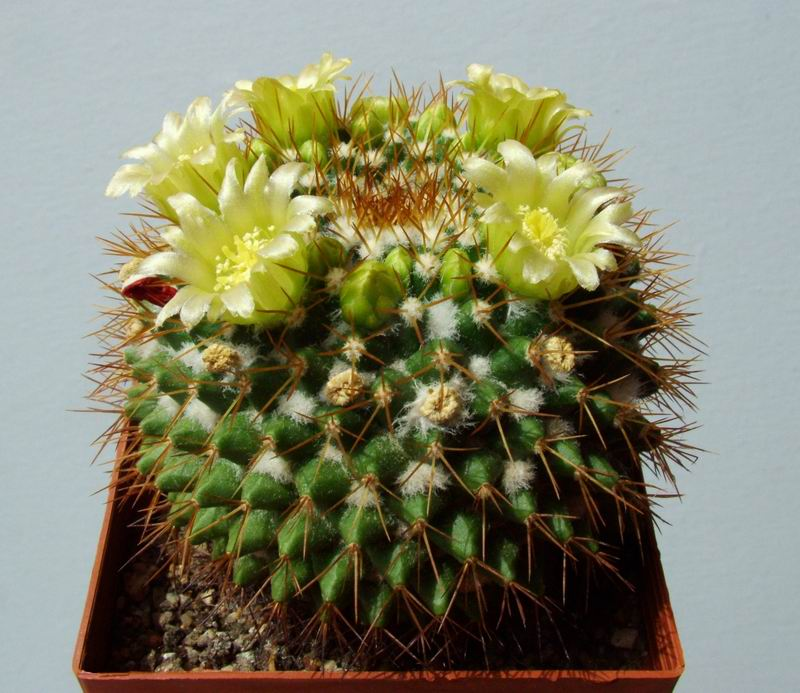
- Mammiliaria marksiana (flowering plant)

Conservation status
- Least Concern (IUCN 3.1)

Scientific classification
- Kingdom: Plantae
- Clade: Embryophytes
- Clade: Tracheophytes
- Clade: Spermatophytes
- Clade: Angiosperms
- Clade: Eudicots
- Order: Caryophyllales
- Family: Cactaceae
- Subfamily: Cactoideae
- Genus: Mammillaria
- Species: M. marksiana

Binomial name
- Mammillaria marksiana Krainz

Synonyms
- Mammillaria sonorensis var. marksiana (Krainz) E.Kuhn (1980)

= Mammillaria marksiana =

Species of cactus

Mammillaria marksiana is a cactus in the genus Mammillaria of the family Cactaceae.

== Description ==
Mammillaria marksiana is a small, green, globose cactus. It can reach a diameter of 5–12 centimetres (2.0–4.7 in) and a height of 6–15 centimetres (2.4–5.9 in). With age it becomes slightly columnar and may begin to produce offsets. The tubercles are roughly pyramid shaped. Radial and central spines are variable in number from 4 to 21. They are thin, needle-shaped, golden-yellow to brown, 5–8 millimetres (0.20–0.31 in) in length. The blooming area is usually covered by snow-white wool. The funnel-shaped flowers are green or lemon-yellow and reach a size of about 1.5 cm. The fruits are reddish-purple, club-shaped, usually under 2 cm long and contain small brown seeds.

== Distribution ==
This species is endemic to western Mexico (states of Durango, Chihuahua, Sonora and Sinaloa).

== Habitat ==
The natural habitat of Mammillaria marksiana is arid deserts in the mountain range east of the Sierra Madre, at an altitude of 400–2,000 metres (1,300–6,600 ft) above sea level. This cactus has spread throughout the world as an ornamental plant.

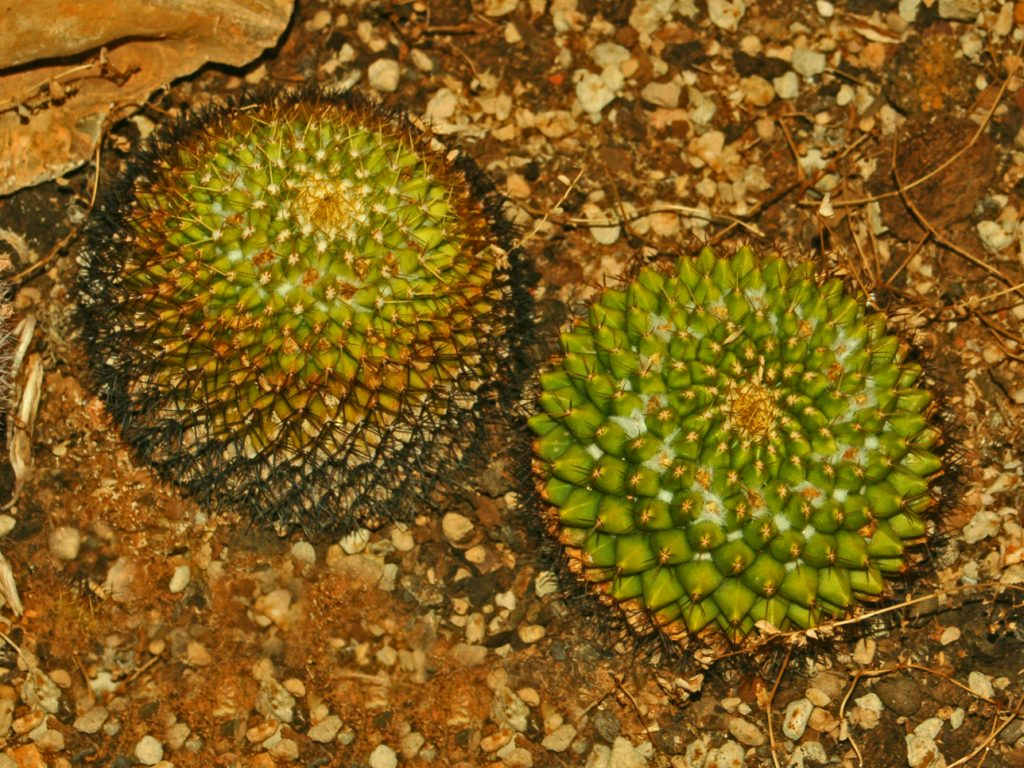
Mammiliaria marksiana at the botanical garden of Villa Durazzo-Pallavicini, Genova Pegli

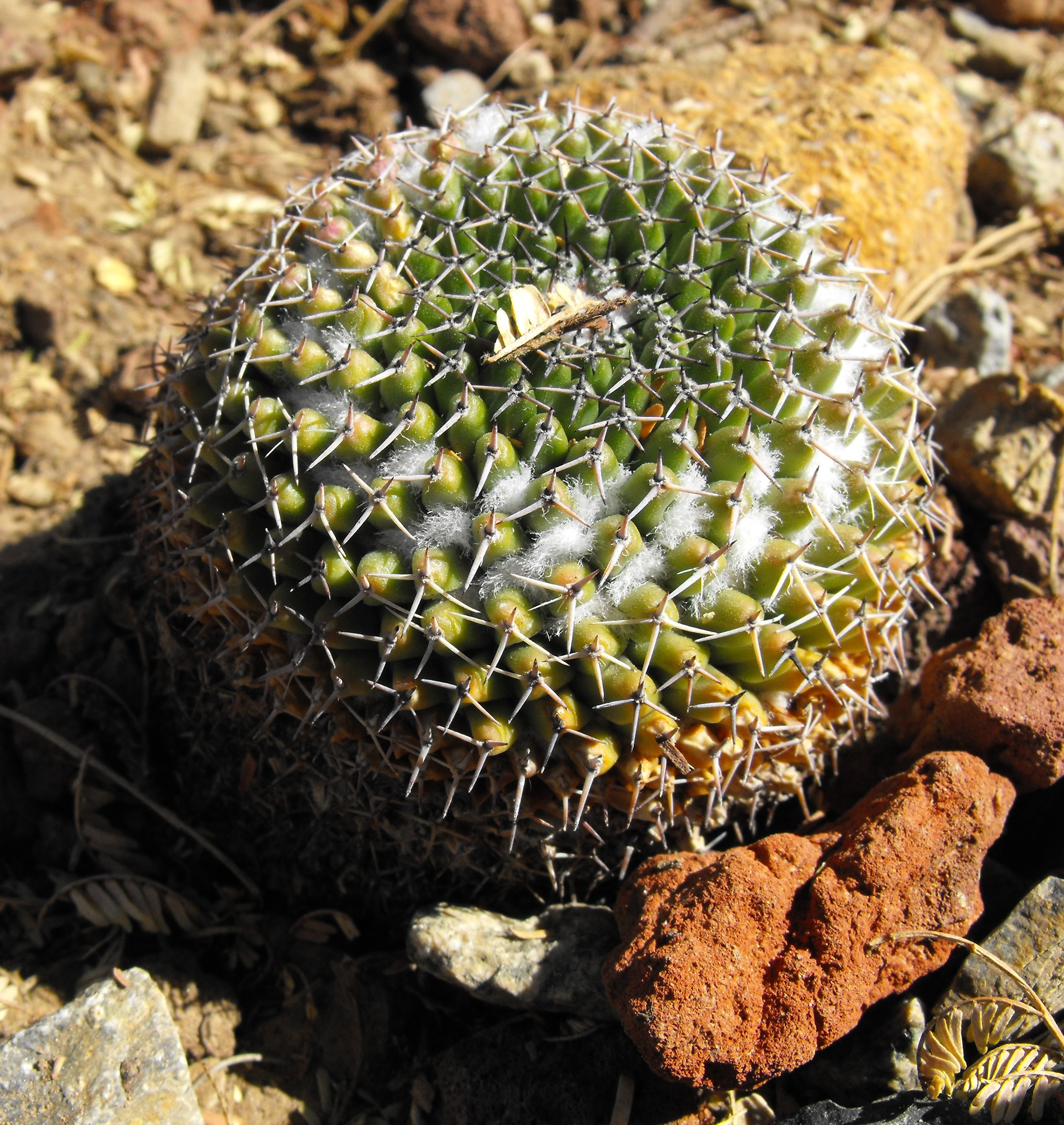
Mammiliaria marksiana at the Palomar College Arboretum, San Marcos, California, USA. Identified by sign.

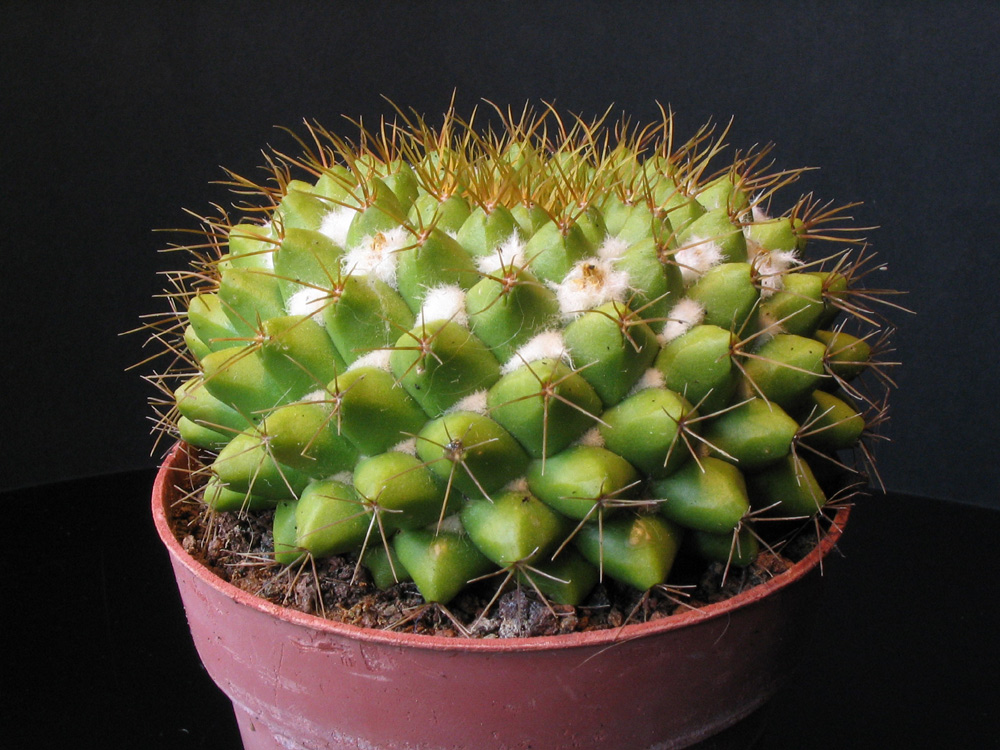
Mammiliaria marksiana (plant habit)
