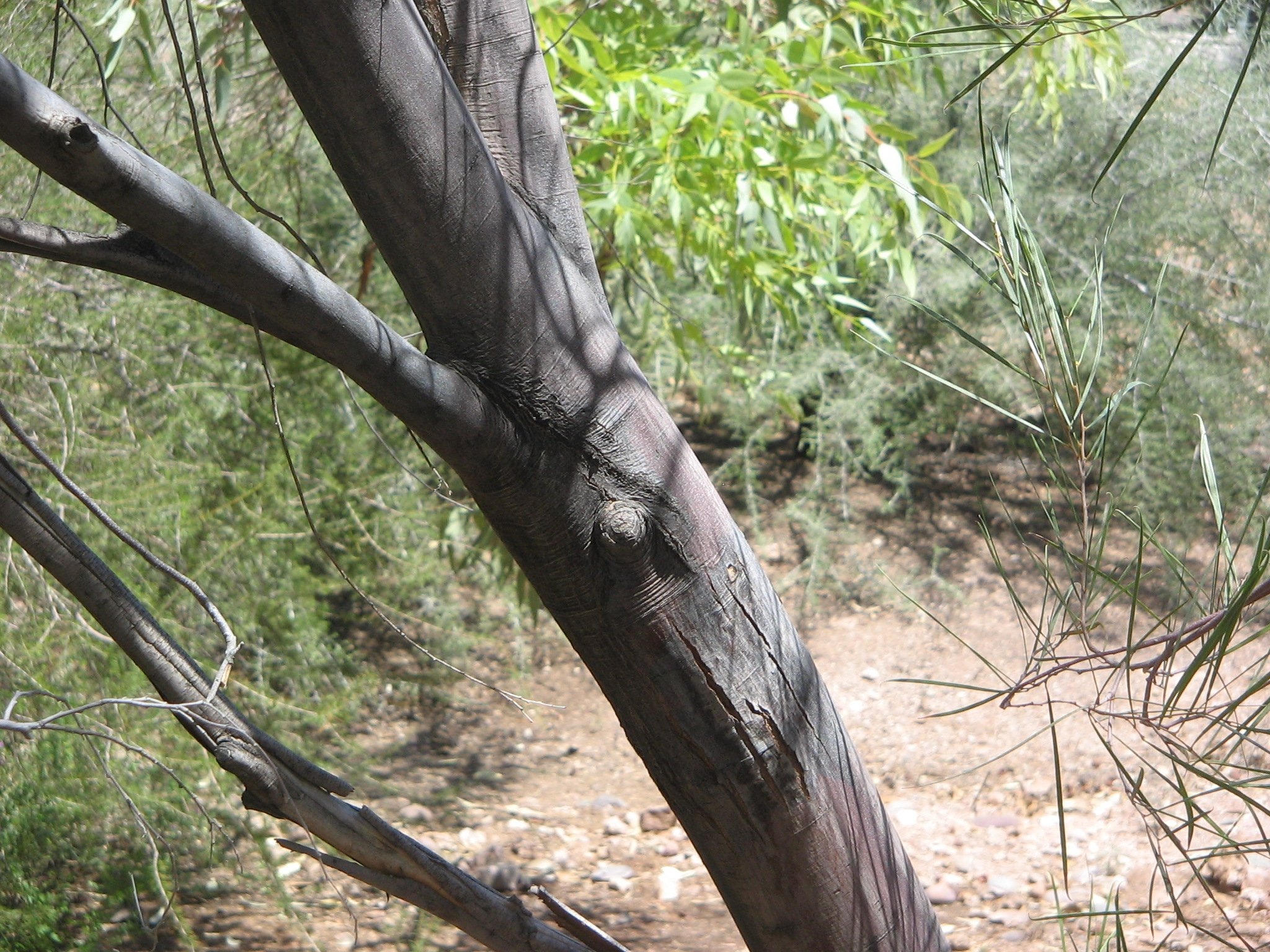
- Stem in the Desert Botanical Garden, Phoenix

Conservation status
- Priority One — Poorly Known Taxa (DEC)

Scientific classification
- Kingdom: Plantae
- Clade: Tracheophytes
- Clade: Angiosperms
- Clade: Eudicots
- Clade: Rosids
- Order: Fabales
- Family: Fabaceae
- Subfamily: Caesalpinioideae
- Clade: Mimosoid clade
- Genus: Acacia
- Species: A. microneura

Binomial name
- Acacia microneura Meisn.

Synonyms
- Acacia subangularis Maiden & Blakely; Racosperma microneurum (Meisn.) Pedley; Acacia lineolata auct. non Benth.: Diels, F.L.E. & Pritzel, E.G. (6 December 1904)

= Acacia microneura =

Species of legume

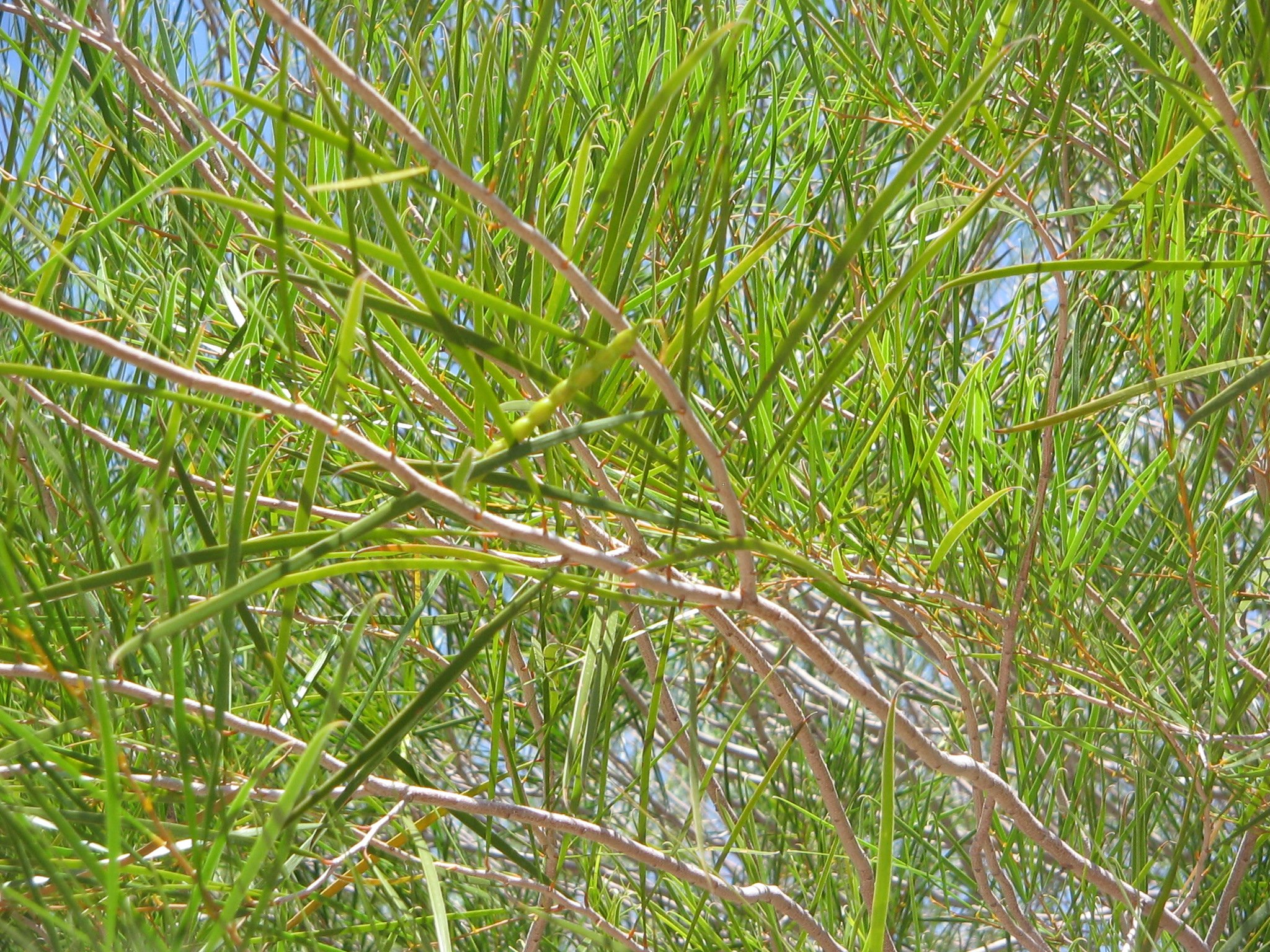
Foliage and a seed pod

Acacia microneura is a species of flowering plant in the family Fabaceae, and is endemic to Cranbrook in the south of Western Australia. It is a shrub with ascending, linear, curved or s-shaped, needle-like phyllodes, spherical to broadly elliptic or oblong heads of golden yellow flowers. The pods and seeds have not been recorded.

== Description ==
Acacia microneura is a shrub that typically grows to a height of up to 1.5 m (4 ft 11 in) and has resinous, angled young branchlets and small white hairs between the angles. Its phyllodes are linear, curved or s-shaped and needle-like, or flat to slightly compressed, 40–110 mm (1.6–4.3 in) long, 1–2 mm (0.039–0.079 in) wide with a central vein and about three closely parallel veins. The flowers are borne in one or two spherical to broadly elliptic or oblong head in axils on peduncles up to 1 mm (0.039 in) long, the heads 5.5–6 mm (0.22–0.24 in) long and 5.5 mm (0.22 in) in diameter with about 20 golden yellow flowers. The pods and seeds have not been observed.

== Taxonomy ==
Acacia microneura was first formally described in 1844 by Carl Meissner in Lehmann's Plantae Preissianae. The specific epithet (microneura) means 'small nerved'.

== Distribution and habitat ==
This species of wattle grows in sand to loam over granite in heath and on disturbed road verges and is only known from near Cranbrook in the Avon Wheatbelt and Esperance Plains bioregion.

== Conservation status ==
Acacia microneura is listed as 'Priority One' by the Government of Western Australia Department of Biodiversity, Conservation and Attractions, meaning that it is known from only one or a few locations where it is potentially at risk.

== See also ==
- List of Acacia species
