= Margaret Bell Douglas =

Canadian botanist and horticulturalist

- Born: Edith Margaret Bell; February 7, 1880; Montreal, Quebec, Canada
- Died: October 10, 1963 (aged 83); Phoenix, Arizona, U.S.
- Occupation(s): botanist and horticulturalist
- Awards: Arizona Women's Hall of Fame (1991)

Edith Margaret Bell Douglas (February 7, 1880 – October 10, 1963) was a Canadian botanist and horticulturist known for her work in the Southwestern United States and Mexico. She helped establish the Desert Botanical Garden and donated 1,500 of her own specimens to its herbarium. She is a member of the Arizona Women's Hall of Fame and the namesake of the Garden Club of America's Margaret Douglas Medal.

== Biography ==
Edith Margaret Bell was born on February 7, 1880, in Montreal. Her father, geologist Robert Bell, took her with him on surveys and mapping expeditions when she was a child. Bell was educated in Europe and presented to Queen Victoria at the Court of St. James.

She married Walter Douglas, a mining engineer and railroad manager, in September 1902. The couple moved into an adobe house in Bisbee, Arizona. In 1908, they moved to a large house in Warren and donated their previous home to the YWCA. They had five children and frequently spent their summers in Santa Barbara, California, where they lived in a bungalow built by Francis Townsend Underhill in what is now Montecito Park.

Douglas became interested in gardening and landscaping and began to work on projects related to her husband's Phelps Dodge operations. She supervised the landscaping at Copper Queen Hotel, built for visiting investors and dignitaries. She also hired landscape architect Carmillo Fenzi to create a garden for a new El Paso and Southwestern Railroad depot in Tucson, Arizona, and she organized a "garden contest to improve the isolated railroad settlements along the line from Tucson to Douglas and El Paso. She provided flower and vegetable seeds and succeeded in transforming dreary barrenness with luster and beauty."

In 1921, Douglas became a member-at-large of the Garden Club of America. After relocating to Mexico in 1931 for her husband's new position as president of the Sud Pacifico de Mexico rail line, Douglas began working with the railroad company and the Mexican government to create experimental agricultural stations along the western coast of the country, in the hopes of improving native varieties crops such as corn and flax. Douglas also hosted the Garden Club of America's 1937 trip to Mexico.

She was a member of several cultural institutions, including the New York Horticultural Society, the advisory Council of the New York Botanical Gardens, the board of New York City Memorial Hospital, the Phoenix Garden Club, and a trustee of the Heard Museum of Anthropology and Primitive Art. With Gertrude Webster, she helped establish the Desert Botanical Garden and donated 1,500 specimens for its herbarium. Douglas also campaigned to prevent the development of Camelback Mountain and to save the California redwoods.

In 1952, the Garden Club of America created the Margaret Douglas Medal, "awarded for notable service to the cause of conservation education."

Douglas died in Phoenix on October 10, 1963.

She was inducted into the Arizona Women's Hall of Fame in 1991.
