= Barrel cactus =

Type of cactus

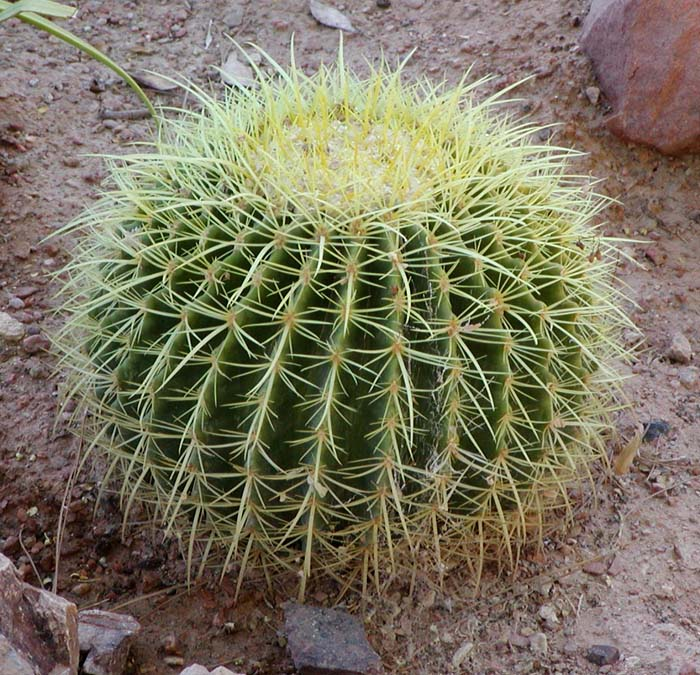
Echinocactus grusonii — golden barrel cactus, endemic to Mexico

Barrel cacti are various members of the two genera Echinocactus and Ferocactus, endemic to the deserts of Southwestern North America southward to north central Mexico. Some of the largest specimens are found in the Sonoran Desert.

== Description ==
Some species of barrel cactus, such as the desert barrel cactus (Ferocactus cylindraceus), reach over 1 metre (3.3 ft) in height at maturity and have been known to reach 3 metres (9.8 ft) in exceptional cases. The ribs are numerous and pronounced, and the spines are long and can range in color from yellow to tan to red, depending on the age of the plant and the species. Flowers appear at the top of the plant only after many years. The barrel cactus can live to be over 100 years old.

Barrel cactus buds typically start to bloom in April with a bright yellow or orange flower. Pink and red varieties also exist but occur less frequently. The flowers only appear on the very top of the plant. As the flowers begin to wilt in early May, they may change color. A late summer North American Monsoon desert rainstorm can produce a late bloom, as shown in the photograph below of the orange-flowered variety (it bloomed two days after a hurricane in mid-August and continued to bloom through the end of September).

=== Fruit ===
As the flowers wilt away, small pineapple-shaped greenish fruit may form. Left untouched, the fruit has been known to last a full calendar year. The fruit can be easily removed but is not usually consumed because it is fairly dry and bitter.

== Facts ==
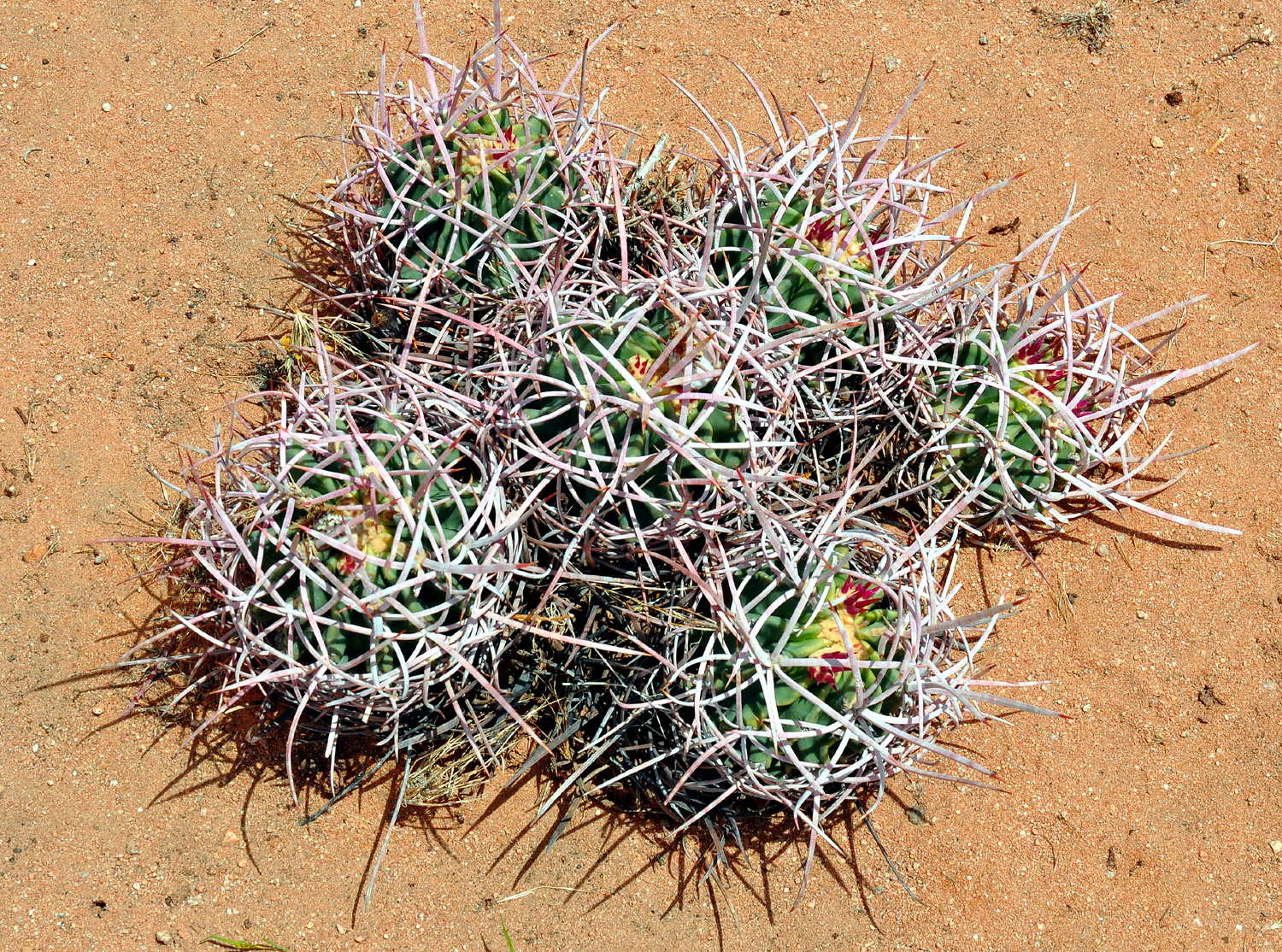
Six young barrel cactus in a cluster in the Mojave Desert

Native Americans collected the fruit as emergency food during extreme drought conditions.

The Seri people distinguished three species of barrel cactus:

- Saguaro barrel cactus — Ferocactus cylindraceus
- Siml caacöl (big barrel cactus), siml cöquicöt (killer barrel cactus) — Ferocactus emoryi
- Siml áa (true barrel cactus) — Ferocactus wislizeni

In Mexico the flesh of the barrel cactus is candied and eaten as a treat.

== Cultivation ==
Barrel cacti are cultivated by plant nurseries as an ornamental plant. They are considered easy to grow and relatively fast growing. They may produce round offshoots.

Barrel cacti can fall over because they grow based on sun orientation. They usually grow towards the south to prevent surface tissue sunburn, giving the name "compass cactus."

== Gallery ==
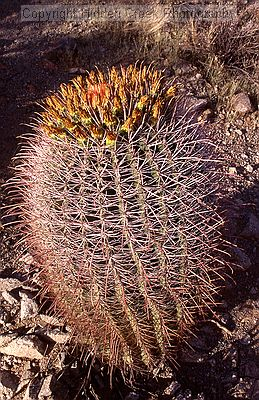
Fishhook barrel cactus with fruit

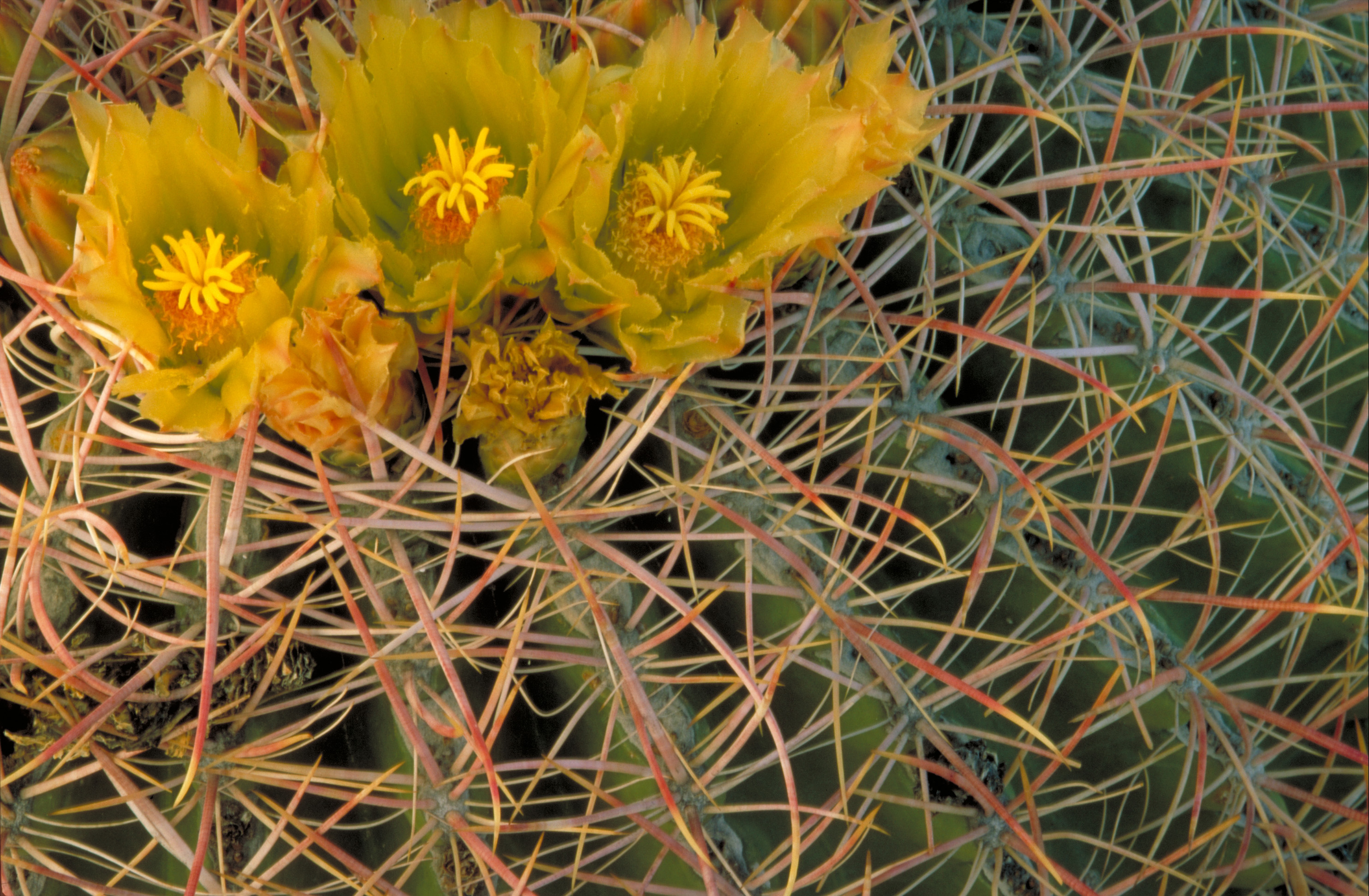
Barrel cactus flowers

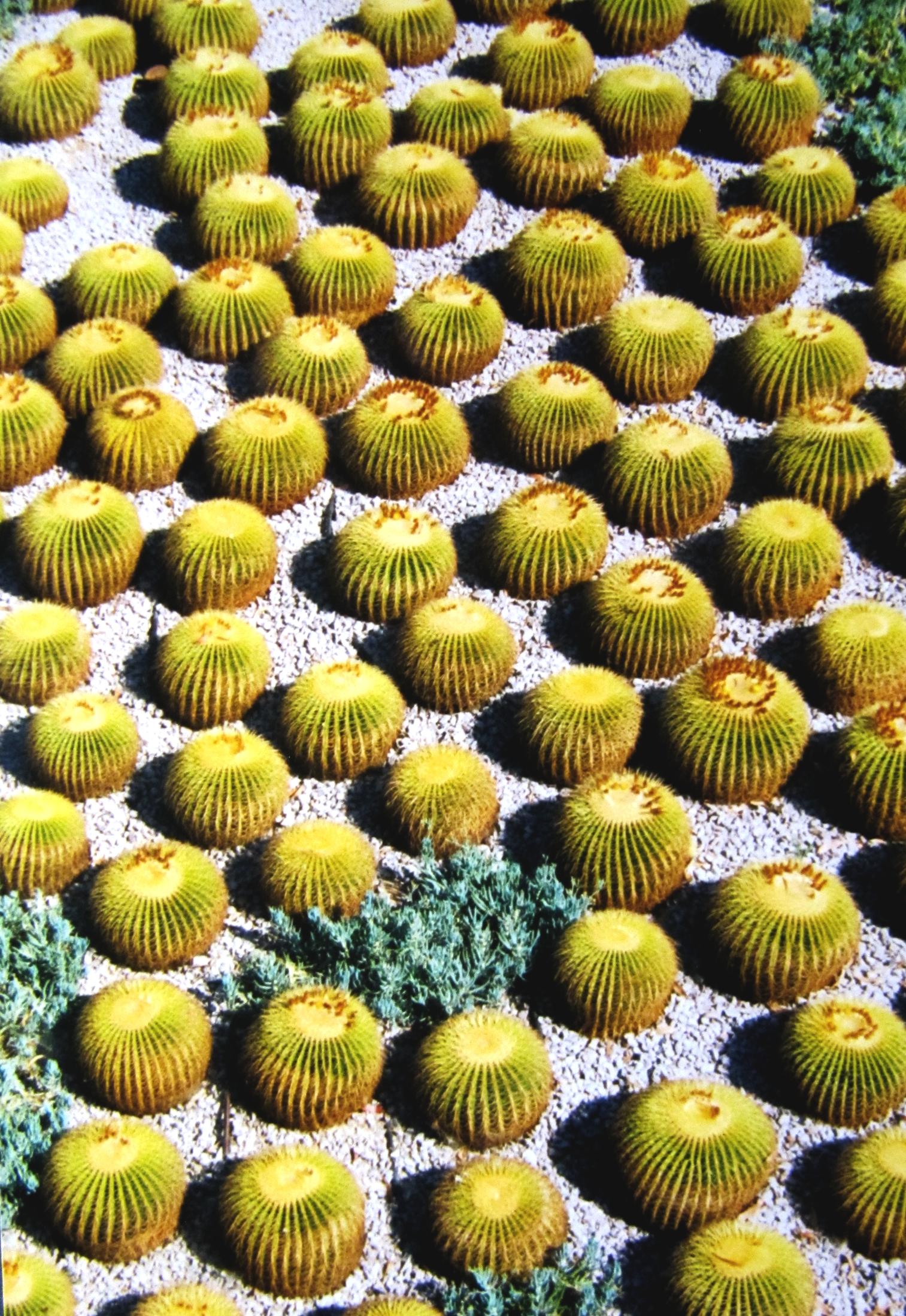
Field of barrel cacti, created with human intervention, in a gravel garden somewhere in California, US

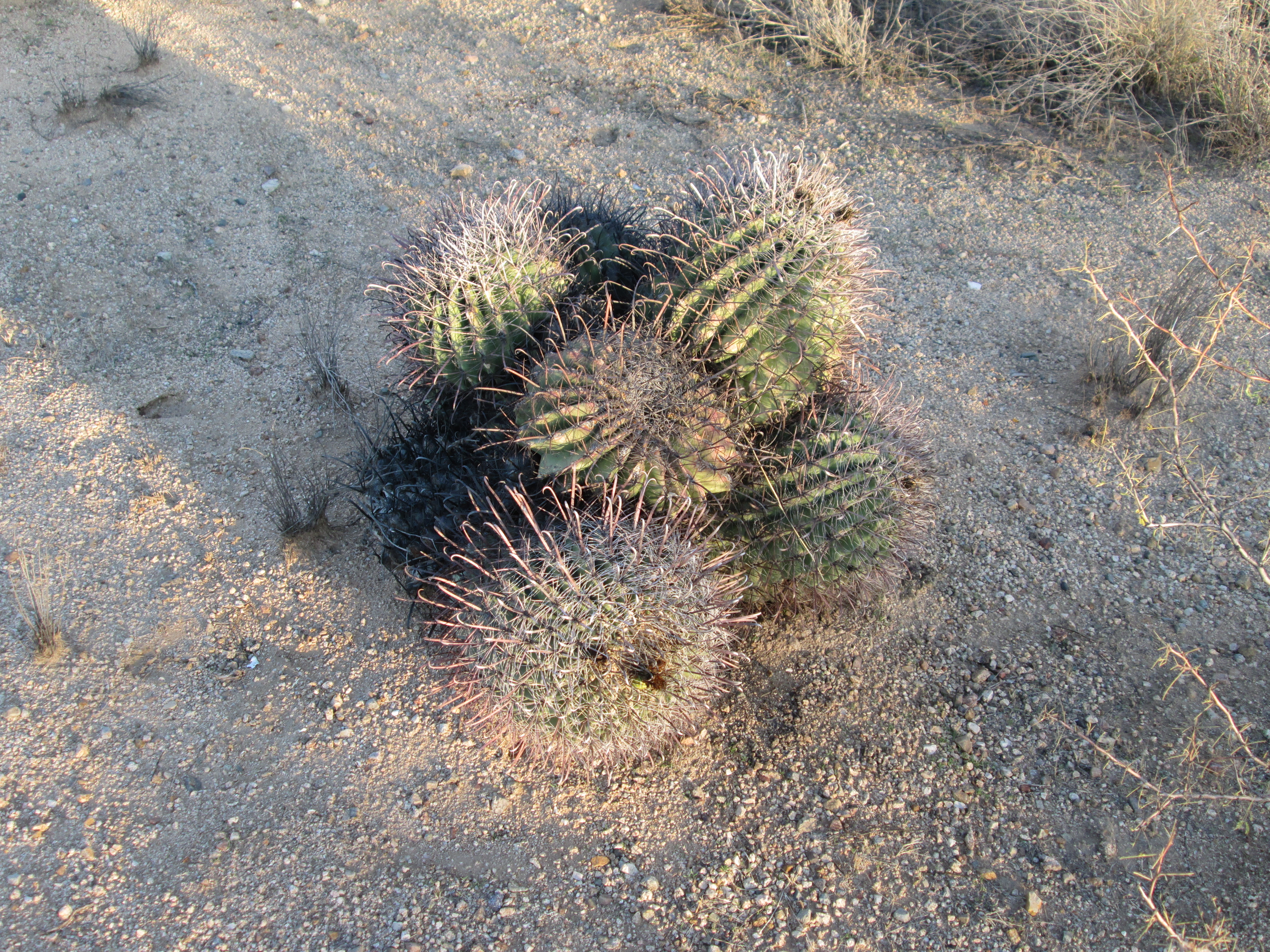
Barrel cactus cluster in Sahuarita, Arizona

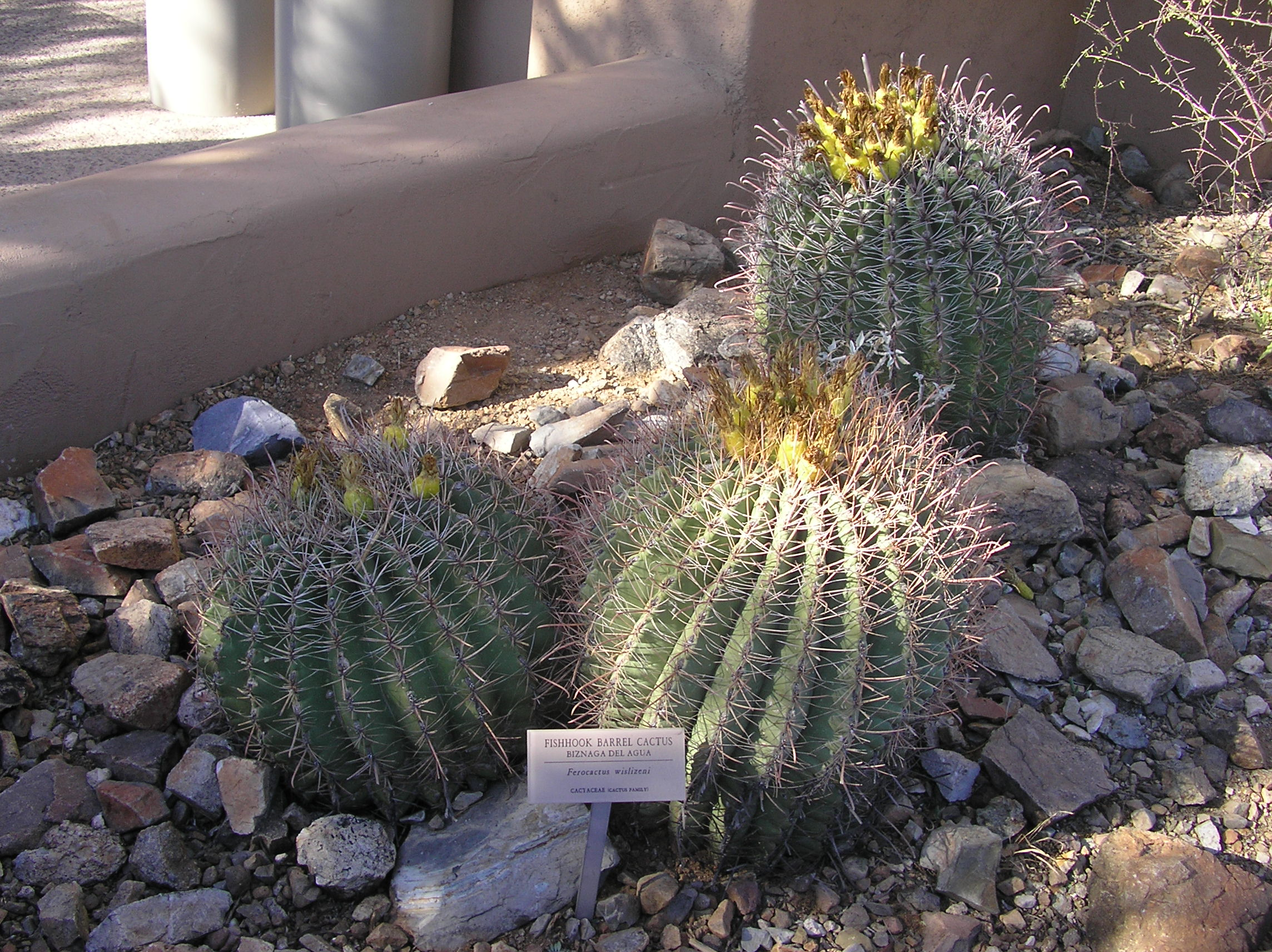
Barrel cactus at the Arizona-Sonora Desert Museum botanical garden

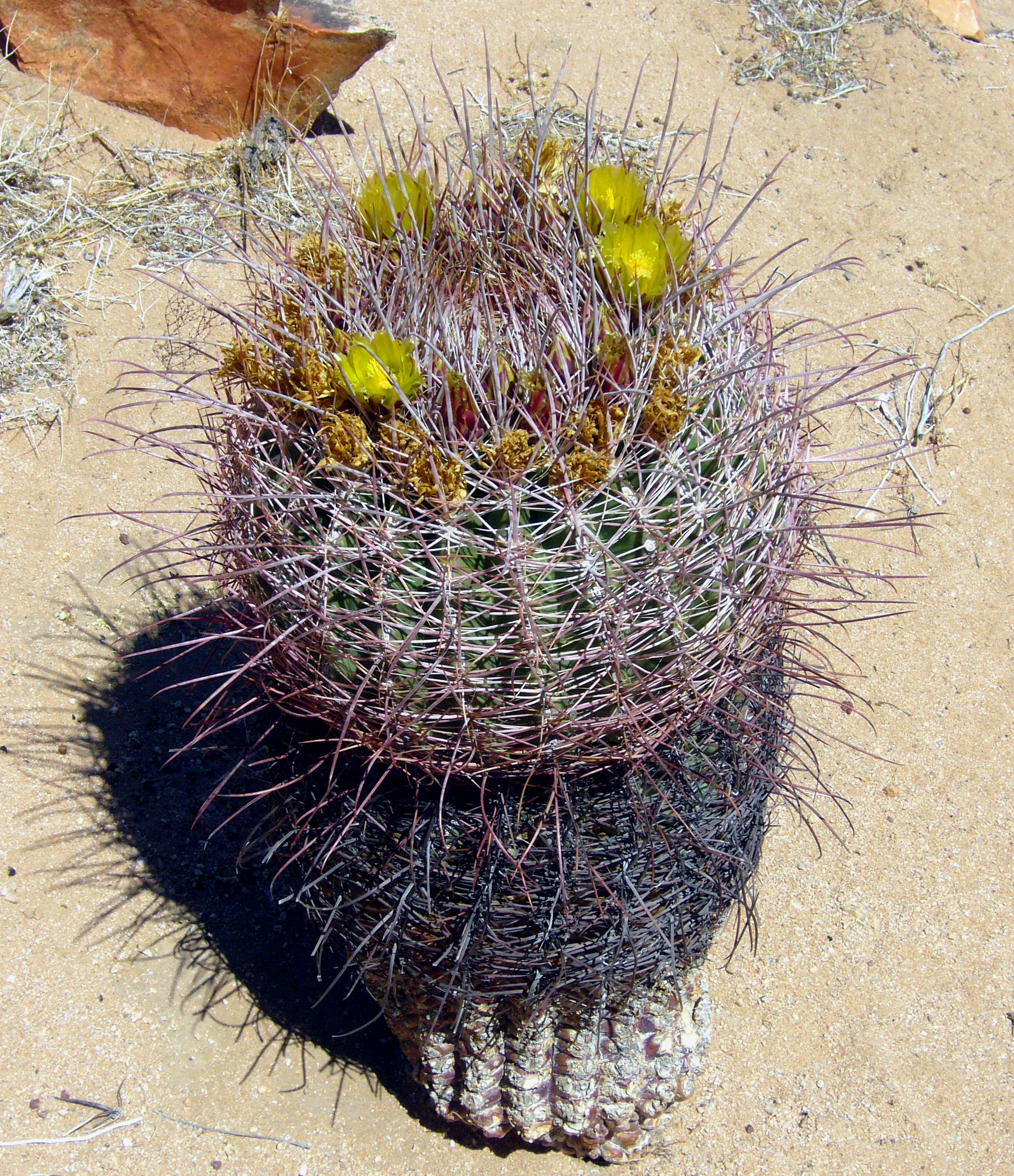
Blooming barrel cactus in the Mojave Desert, California

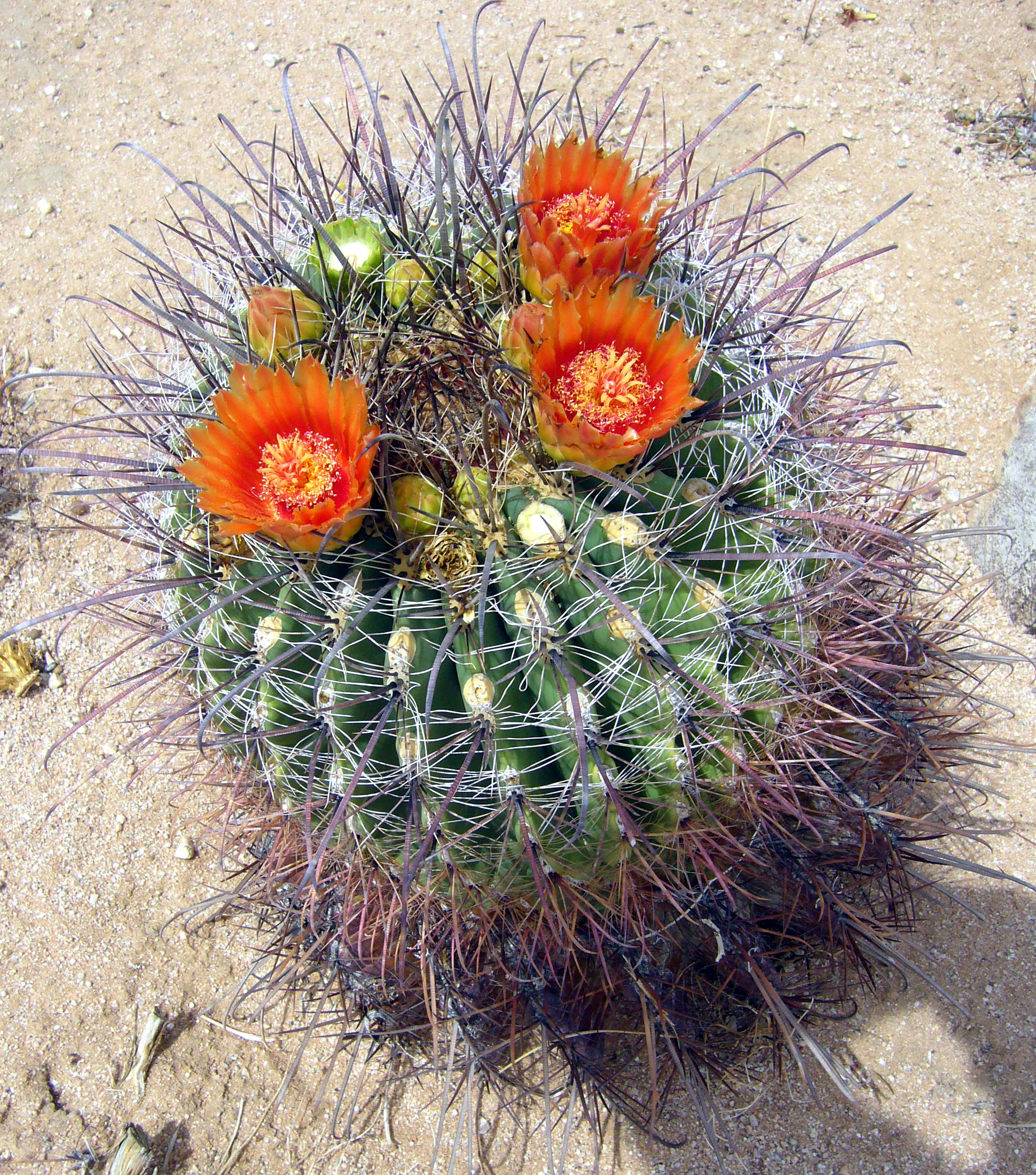
Late-blooming barrel cactus in Landers, California

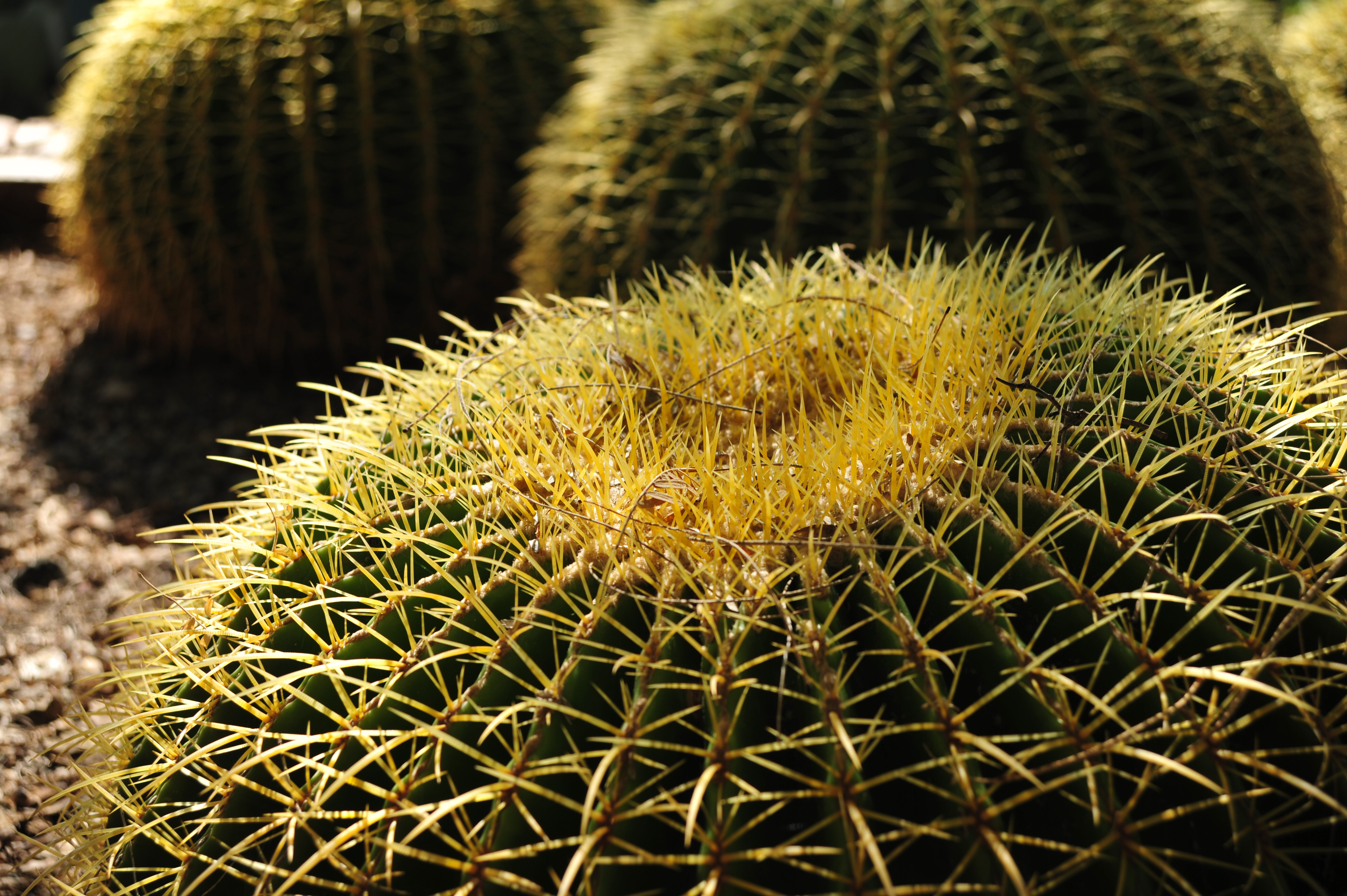
Barrel cactus in Desert Botanical Garden, Phoenix, Arizona
