= Southern Vermont Arts Center =

Historic house in Vermont, United States

- Yester House
- U.S. National Register of Historic Places
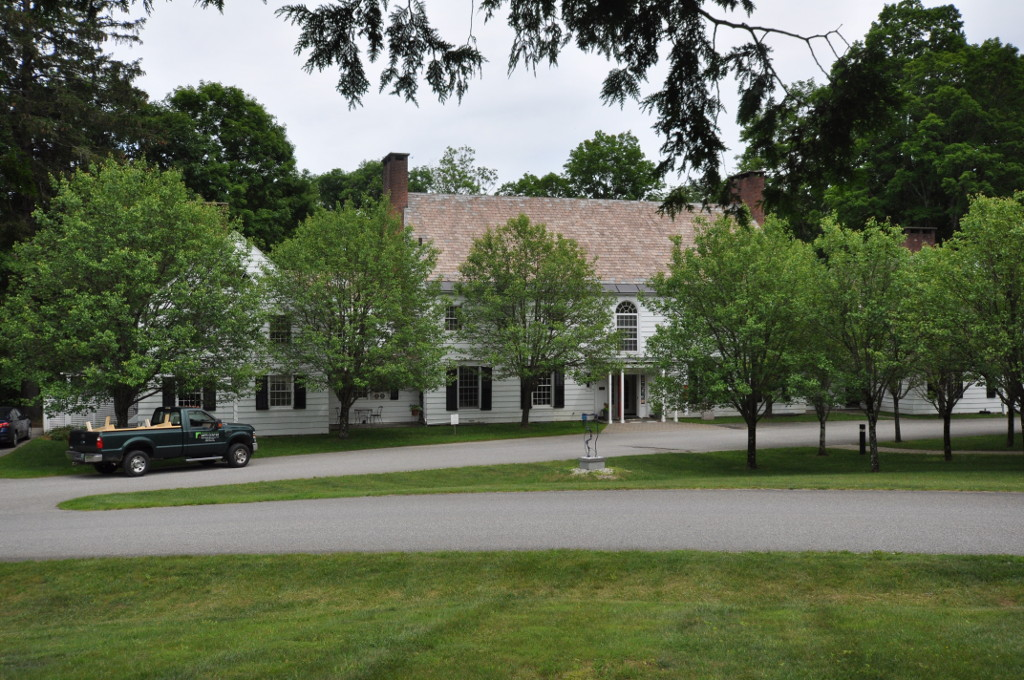

- Location within Vermont Location within the United States
- Location: 860 Southern Vermont Arts Center Dr., Manchester, Vermont
- Area: 118 acres (48 ha)
- Built: 1917
- Architect: Murphy & Dana
- Architectural style: Colonial Revival
- NRHP reference No.: 88002051
- Added to NRHP: November 10, 1988

Southern Vermont Arts Center is a multi-disciplinary arts organization in Manchester, Vermont. It is located on the west side of West Road, at the former Yester House country estate. The center includes art galleries with permanent and rotating exhibits, the area's largest sculpture park, a performance space, and educational facilities. Its grounds are open to the public for recreational pursuits, with trails for hiking and cross-country skiing. The center's campus is listed on the National Register of Historic Places.

== Programs and Collection ==
The Southern Vermont Arts Center has a permanent collection and rotating special exhibitions every season. The permanent collection emphasizes the founding members of the Southern Vermont Artists, Inc., "a collaborative of regional artists, businessmen and women who supported the arts and culture in Southern Vermont in the early 20th century." Many noteworthy artists from the previous century are represented in the collection including Ogden Pleissner, Jay Hall Conaway, Reginald Marsh, Guy Pene du Bois, Lorenzo Hatch, Luigi Lucioni, Arthur Gibbs Burton, and Robert Strong Woodward.

== Campus history ==
The center's campus, first used as a farm and woodlot by members of the Orvis family, was established as a summer country estate by William and Gertrude Divine Ritter, then of Columbus, Ohio, in 1916. The Ritters hired the New York City architectural firm Murphy and Dana to design the main buildings of the estate, include the large 28-room Colonial Revival main house, now known as the Yester House Gallery. The Ritters apparently separated during the development of the estate's plans, and were soon divorced. Gertrude Divine Ritter retained ownership of the estate, soon afterward remarrying, to Hugh Webster. Mrs. Webster used the estate for entertainment, and to display collected artworks, including more than 6,000 pieces of hand-blown glass. Although she wanted the house to become a museum for her collections, they were auctioned off after her death in 1947, and the property was put up for sale. Southern Vermont Artists, Inc. purchased it in 1950, and began development of the arts center with summer exhibits.

The campus has since then grown to include a modern gallery, open-air performance pavilion, and an education center.

== See also ==
- National Register of Historic Places listings in Bennington County, Vermont
