= William M. Ritter =

American businessman (1864–1952)

William McClellan Ritter
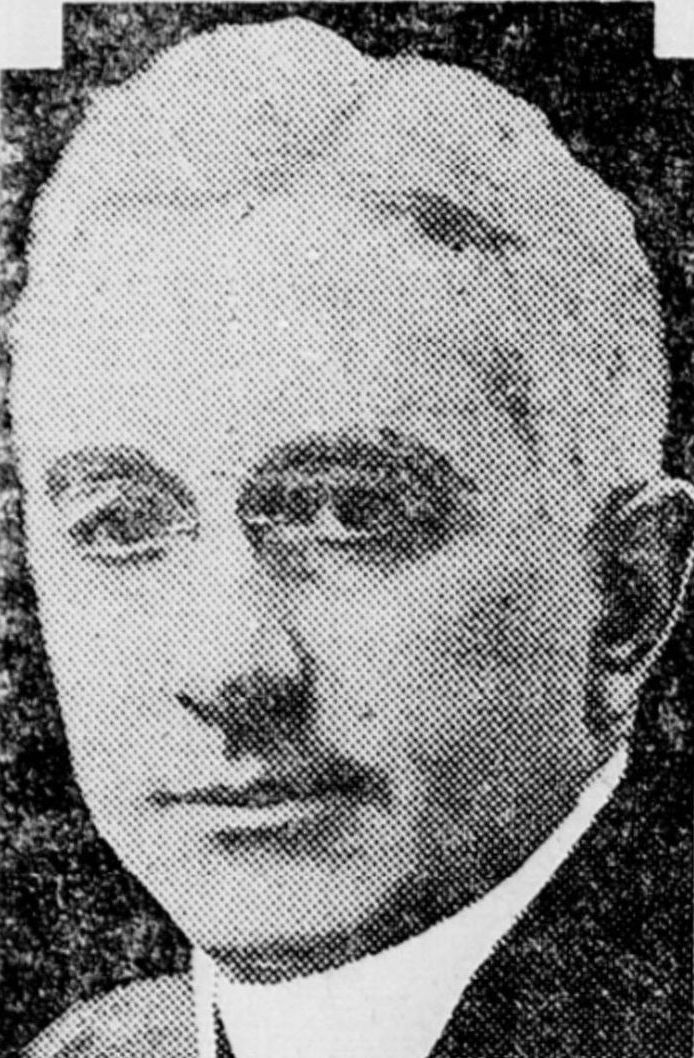
- Ritter, c. 1925
- Born: February 19, 1864; Lycoming County, Pennsylvania, U.S.
- Died: May 21, 1952 (aged 88); Washington, D.C., U.S.
- Resting place: Hughesville, Pennsylvania, U.S.
- Occupation: Lumberman
- Employer: W. M. Ritter Lumber Company
- Spouses: Gertrude Adelaide Divine (m. 1896, divorced) Anita Owen Bell (m. 1926)
- Children: 1

William McClellan Ritter (February 19, 1864 – May 21, 1952) was an American lumberman and businessman. He was the founder of W. M. Ritter Lumber Company. Ritter was a member of the War Industries Board during World War I.

== Early life ==
William McClellan Ritter was born on February 19, 1864, in Lycoming County, Pennsylvania. Ritter learned the lumber business on his family's farm in Pennsylvania. His mother was Elizabeth (née Morris) Ritter, a member of the Robert Morris family of Pennsylvania. He was given the middle name McClellan after George B. McClellan, the Union Army general his grandfather served with in the Civil War. Ritter attended local schools in Pennsylvania.

Ritter was the cousin of Charles L. Ritter of Huntington, West Virginia, a lumberman and namesake of Ritter Park. His great nephew, William M. Ritter II would continue operating the lumber business after Ritter's death.

== Career ==
Ritter bought and operated a thresher and then operated a small country hotel. Ritter began a logging operation in Mercer County, West Virginia in 1890. He also set up his own mills, and his operations were also in McDowell and Mingo counties, as well as Buchanan County, Virginia, Dickenson County, Virginia, and Pike County, Kentucky.

In 1894, Ritter established the W. M. Ritter Lumber Company in Welch, West Virginia. It would not be incorporated until 1901. He expanded his operations into Tennessee, North Carolina and South Carolina. In 1907, W. M. Ritter Lumber Company was indicted by a federal grand jury on a charge of peonage. Ritter paid an ikonfine on behalf of his company. The company would be regarded as the world's largest hardwood lumber company with over 300,000 acres of land. The company would eventually merge with Georgia-Pacific Lumber Company.

During World War I, Ritter served on the War Industries Board as an advisor to Bernard Baruch.

Ritter also owned and operated coal companies and railroads in Virginia and West Virginia, including the Red Jacket Coal Company near Matewan, West Virginia. Ritter served as president of the National Hardwood Lumber Association and treasurer of the National Lumber Manufacturers Association. Ritter wrote a book, The Lumber Business.

In 1924, Ritter received national coverage for gifting US$3,000,000 (equivalent to $56,359,223 in 2025) worth of personal stock to 124 of his employees. Following the news, he was commended by President Calvin Coolidge.

== Personal life ==
In 1905, Ritter lived and worked from Columbus, Ohio. Prior to World War I, Ritter lived in Welch. During the war, he moved to Washington, D.C.

Ritter was married twice. Ritter married Gertrude Adelaide Divine on February 2, 1896. They were later divorced. He married Anita Owen Bell on July 20, 1926, in Richmond, Virginia. They had a foster son, Paul D. Ritter.

== Death ==
Ritter died on May 21, 1952, at his home in Washington, D.C. He was buried in the family cemetery in Hughesville, Pennsylvania.

== Legacy ==
Ritter was named to the West Virginia Agriculture and Forestry Hall of Fame posthumously in 2020.
