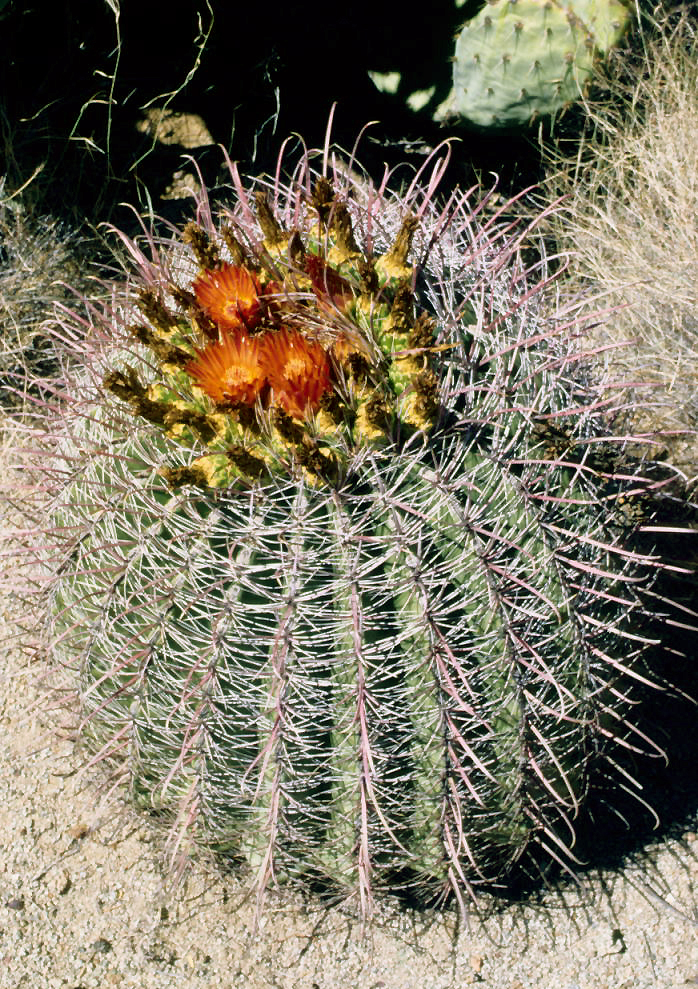
- Ferocactus emoryi in Saguaro National Park

Conservation status
- Least Concern (IUCN 3.1)

Scientific classification
- Kingdom: Plantae
- Clade: Tracheophytes
- Clade: Angiosperms
- Clade: Eudicots
- Order: Caryophyllales
- Family: Cactaceae
- Subfamily: Cactoideae
- Genus: Ferocactus
- Species: F. emoryi

Binomial name
- Ferocactus emoryi (Engelm.) Orcutt

Synonyms
- Echinocactus emoryi Engelm. 1856; Ferocactus rectispinus; Echinocactus covillei (Britton & Rose) A. Berger 1929; Ferocactus covillei Britton & Rose 1922

= Ferocactus emoryi =

Species of cactus

Ferocactus emoryi, known commonly as Emory's barrel cactus, Coville's barrel cactus and traveler's friend, is a barrel cactus in the genus Ferocactus.

== Description ==
Ferocactus emoryi is spherical or cylindrical solitary barrel cactus, light green to glaucous, reaching a diameter of 60–100 centimetres (24–39 in) and a height of 2–2.5 metres (6 ft 7 in – 8 ft 2 in). It has 15 to 30 ribs with tubercles, especially in the juvenile stage. The spines are white to reddish. The central spine is very strong, 4–10 cm long, while the seven to twelve radial spines reach lengths of up to 6 cm. The large and funnel-shaped flowers are usually red or yellow, reach lengths of up to 7.5 centimeters and have a diameter of 5 to 7 centimeters. The fruit is ovoidal, about 5 cm long. The subspecies F. e. subsp. rectispinus has been found with center spines as much as 25 cm (9.8 in) long, to even 32 cm (13 in). These are the longest spines of any cactus.

== Subspecies ==
Three subspecies are accepted:

Image	Scientific name	Distribution
	Ferocactus emoryi subsp. emoryi	Arizona to Mexico (Sonora)
	Ferocactus emoryi subsp. rectispinus (Engelm.) N.P.Taylor	NE. Mexico (to Chihuahua)
	Ferocactus emoryi subsp. covillei (Britton & Rose) D.R.Hunt & Dimmitt	Arizona to Mexico (N. Sonora)

== Distribution ==
This species is found in nature in Mexico in the states of Sonora, Sinaloa and Baja California Sur and in the United States in Arizona in Yuma, Pima and Maricopa counties. Ferocactus emoryi grows in the desert scrubs, hillsides, rocky slopes and gravely rocky or sandy soils, at an elevation from 0–1,200 metres (0–3,937 ft).

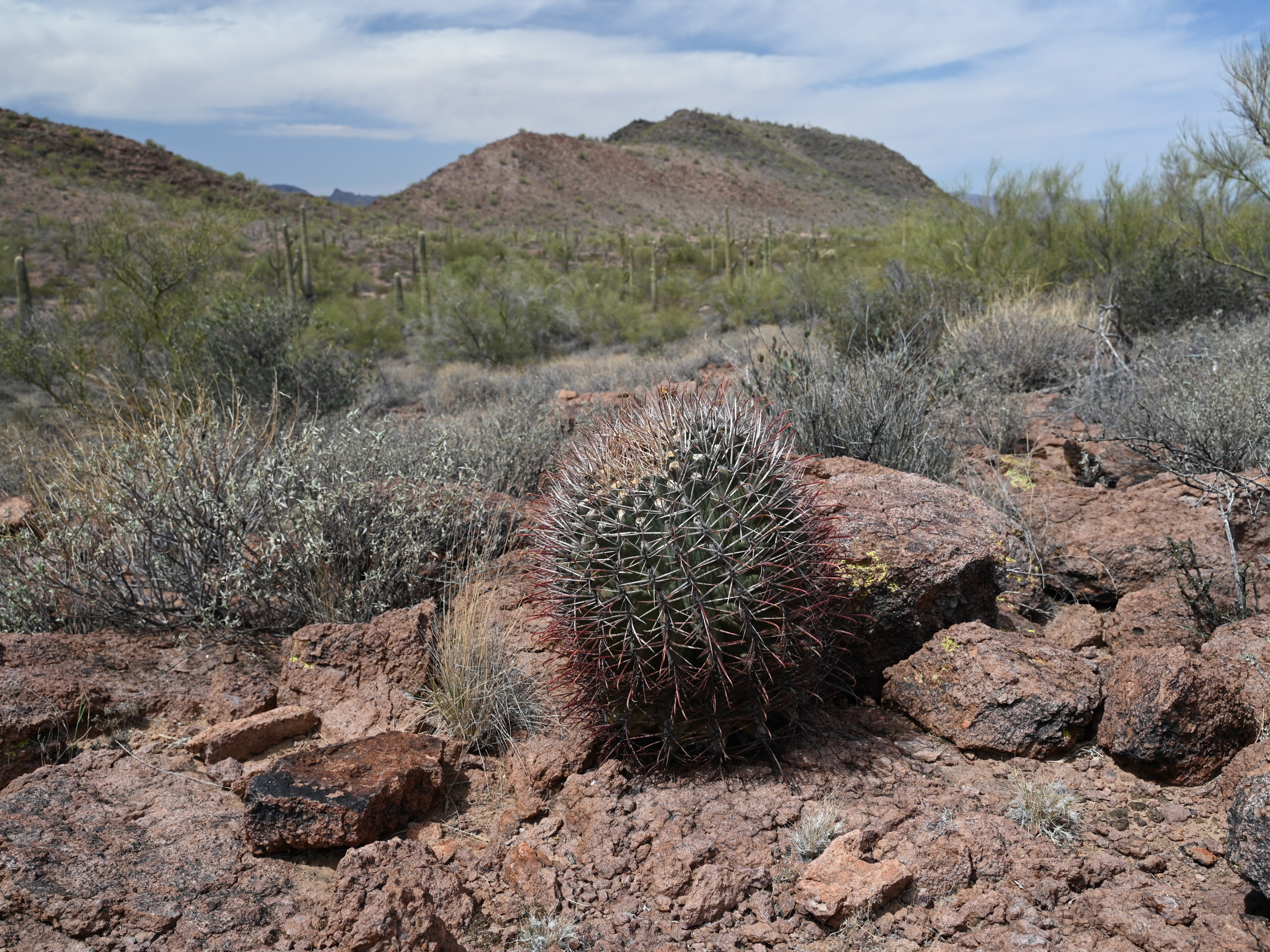
Ferocactus emoryi in Tillotson Peak Wayside in Organ Pipe Cactus Wilderness, Arizona

== Taxonomy ==
The species was first described as Echinocactus emoryi in 1848 by George Engelmann who named the plant after American Major William Hemsley Emory, who was responsible for the surveying work on the Mexican border from 1850 to 1854. Charles Russell Orcutt placed the species in the genus Ferocactus in 1926.
