= Gertrude Webster =

Philanthropist

- Born: Gertrude Adelaide Divine; June 4, 1872; Sycamore, Illinois, US
- Died: March 31, 1947 (aged 74); Phoenix, Arizona, US
- Other names: Gertrude Divine Ritter; Gertrude Divine Webster
- Spouses: William McClellan Ritter (m. 1898; div. 1922) Hugh Webster (m. 1924; div. 1928)

Gertrude Divine Webster (born Gertrude Adelaide Divine; June 4, 1872) was an American philanthropist known for co-founding the Desert Botanical Garden in Phoenix, Arizona, and establishing Yester House, her summer estate which is on the National Register of Historic Places and houses the Southern Vermont Arts Center. During her marriage to William McClellan Ritter (1898 to 1922) she was known as Gertrude Divine Ritter. She subsequently married Hugh Webster (1924 until 1928), and was known as Gertrude Divine Webster until her death on March 31, 1947.

== Early life and education ==
Webster was born in 1872 in Sycamore, Illinois. Her parents were Richard L. Divine and Susan S. Smith Divine. She attended Ann Arbor High School. She earned a Bachelor of Letters from the University of Michigan in 1896.

After college, she lived in Columbus, Ohio, where she founded the Big Sister movement in Columbus. On February 2, 1898, she married a lumber tycoon from West Virginia, William McClellan Ritter, at St. Thomas' Church in New York. While in Columbus, Webster was the president of the Columbus Arts Association from 1911 to 1921. In 1909, Webster commissioned the painter Cecilia Beaux to paint her mother while Beaux was in Columbus, Ohio. The resulting painting "Mrs. Richard Low Devine, born Susan Sofia Smith", was displayed in the Columbus Museum of Art multiple times.

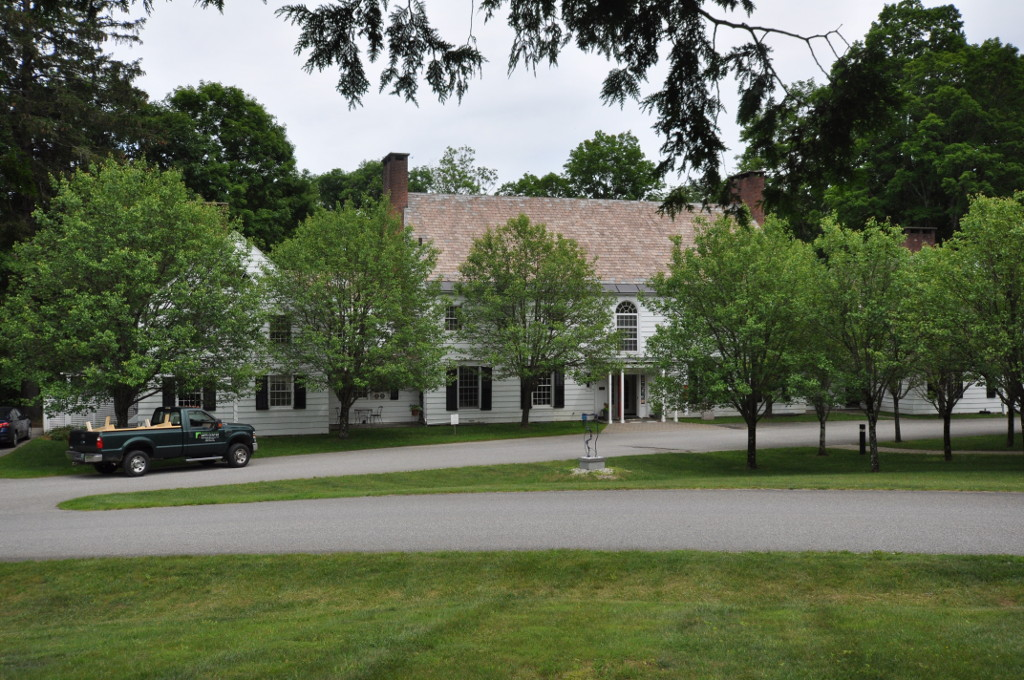
Yester House, now the location of the Southern Vermont Arts Center, formerly served as Webster's winter home.

Webster's summer home, Yester House, was in Manchester, Vermont. The house was built for Webster, her then-husband William Ritter, and their two adopted children in 1917. The house was designed by Henry Murphy and Richard Henry Dana, with the landscape design done by Charles N. Lowrie. While she lived there, the house held 6,000 pieces of Swiss glass, and Webster wrote about the Vermont Glass Factory in a 1923 article in Country Life. She also worked with the League of Women Voters in Vermont. From 1919 until 1921, Webster was one of the highest tax payers in Manchester, and at the time Yester House was showcased in Country Life magazine. In 1950, Yester House was purchased by the Southern Vermont Arts Center. In 1988, a successful application was filed for Yester house to join the National Register of Historic Places.

Webster divorced Ritter in 1922, and they agreed she was to receive $70,000 per year, the Vermont house, and a house in Washington, DC. When Ritter stopped paying alimony in 1932, she sued him. The resulting 1934 trial was covered by the New York Times during which Webster noted that Ritter "beat the horses and the dogs" and further objected when she brought ailing children from a Washington, DC, hospital to their summer home in Vermont. Webster initially declined a settlement offer of $30,000 per year, but accepted the offer the following day.

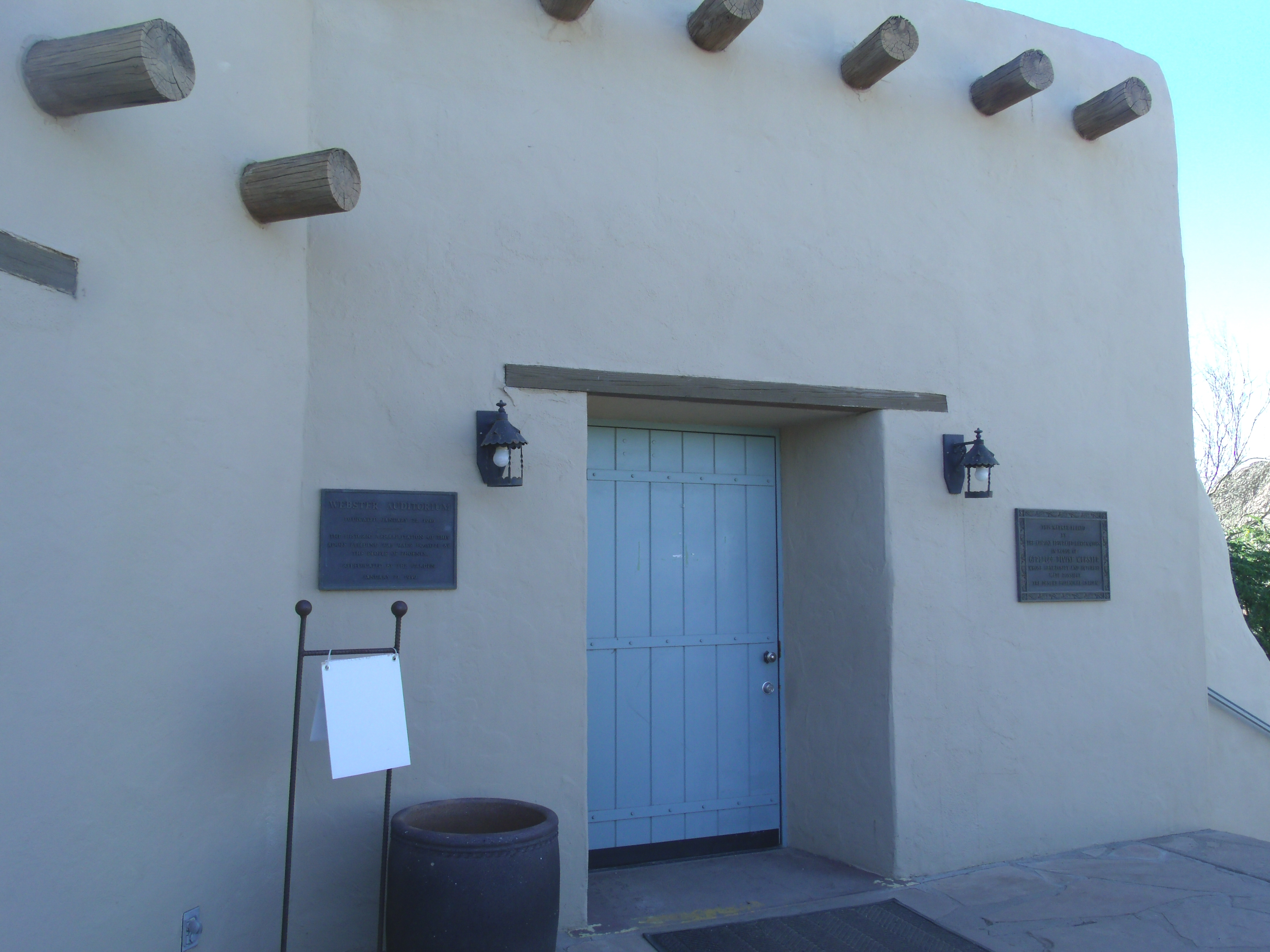
Webster Auditorium at the Desert Botanical Garden in Phoenix, Arizona.

Webster was also a collector of early Americana who donated multiple pieces to the Smithsonian Museum of American History. In 1924 she donated a room to the Smithsonian Institution. The donation was the paneled walls of the parlor of the Reuben Bliss house from Springfield, Massachusetts, which was presented in a 1957 report.

Webster married Hugh Webster in Manchester, Vermont, on November 22, 1924, and they split their time between Vermont and Phoenix. She divorced him in 1928, but retained the last name Webster.

A few years later, after a trip to Switzerland, Webster returned to Phoenix with an unusual cactus and met Gustaf Starck, an engineer who organized the Arizona Cactus and Native Flora Society in 1934. In 1936, Webster, now president of the Arizona Cactus and Native Flora Society, asked the state of Arizona for land and $2500 to run the garden. When the state declined, Webster raised the $40,000 needed to establish the garden, including a $10,000 donation of her own. In 1938 they got permission from the state of Arizona to use the land, in what had been the Papago Saguaro National Monument, as a botanical garden. The landscape architect Charles Gibbs Adams helped design the plans for the botanical garden, and Webster helped design the layout while she was living at her house in Vermont. The Desert Botanical Garden opened to the public in 1939, and included plants donated by Starck, Webster, and others. The Webster Auditorium, named after Gertrude Webster, is on the property of the Desert Botanical Garden and was dedicated on January 21, 1940, with over 1500 people attending the ceremony. During World War II, the garden was tended by a few volunteers, but was not faring well.

Webster died on March 31, 1947 in Phoenix and was buried in the Elmwood Cemetery in DeKalb County, Illinois. She directed the income from her Arizona properties to the Arizona Cactus and Native Flora Society to be used in the administration of the Desert Botanical Garden. The one stipulation was that the society had to retain at least two hundred members in good standing, which Lou Ella Archer made happen in the period following Webster's death. Upon her death, items from her estate were auctioned off in New York City, ultimately resulting in a donation for over $114,000 that was given to the Children's Hospital in Columbus, Ohio.

== Honors ==
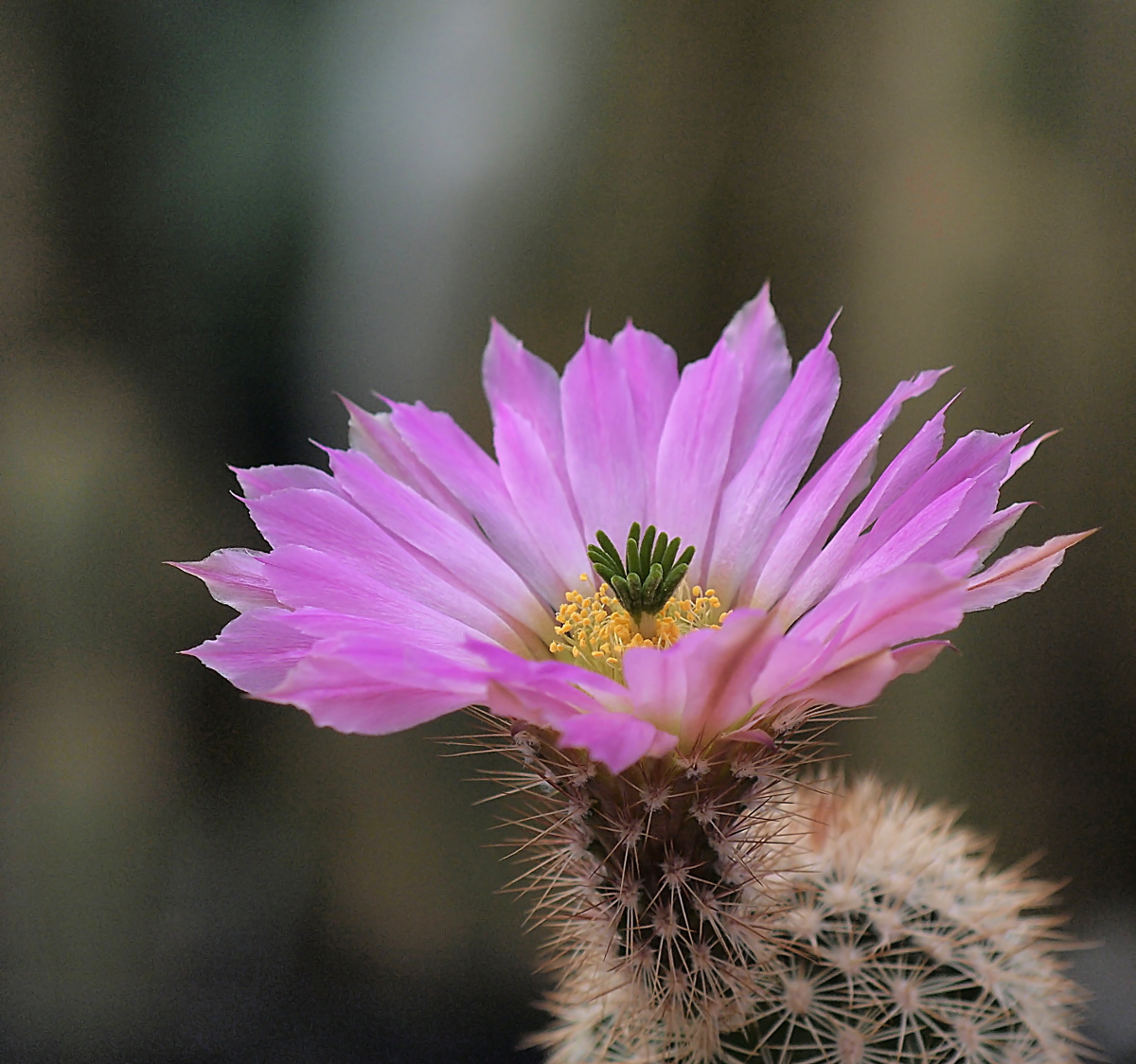
Echinocereus websterianus, named after Webster in 1947 by George Edmund Lindsay

George Edmund Lindsay, who served as the executive director of the Desert Botanical Garden, named a succulent after Webster. The plant, Echinocereus websterianus is described in the Cactus and Succulent Journal of America in a 1947 publication.
