= Desert Botanical Garden =

Botanical garden in Phoenix, Arizona, US

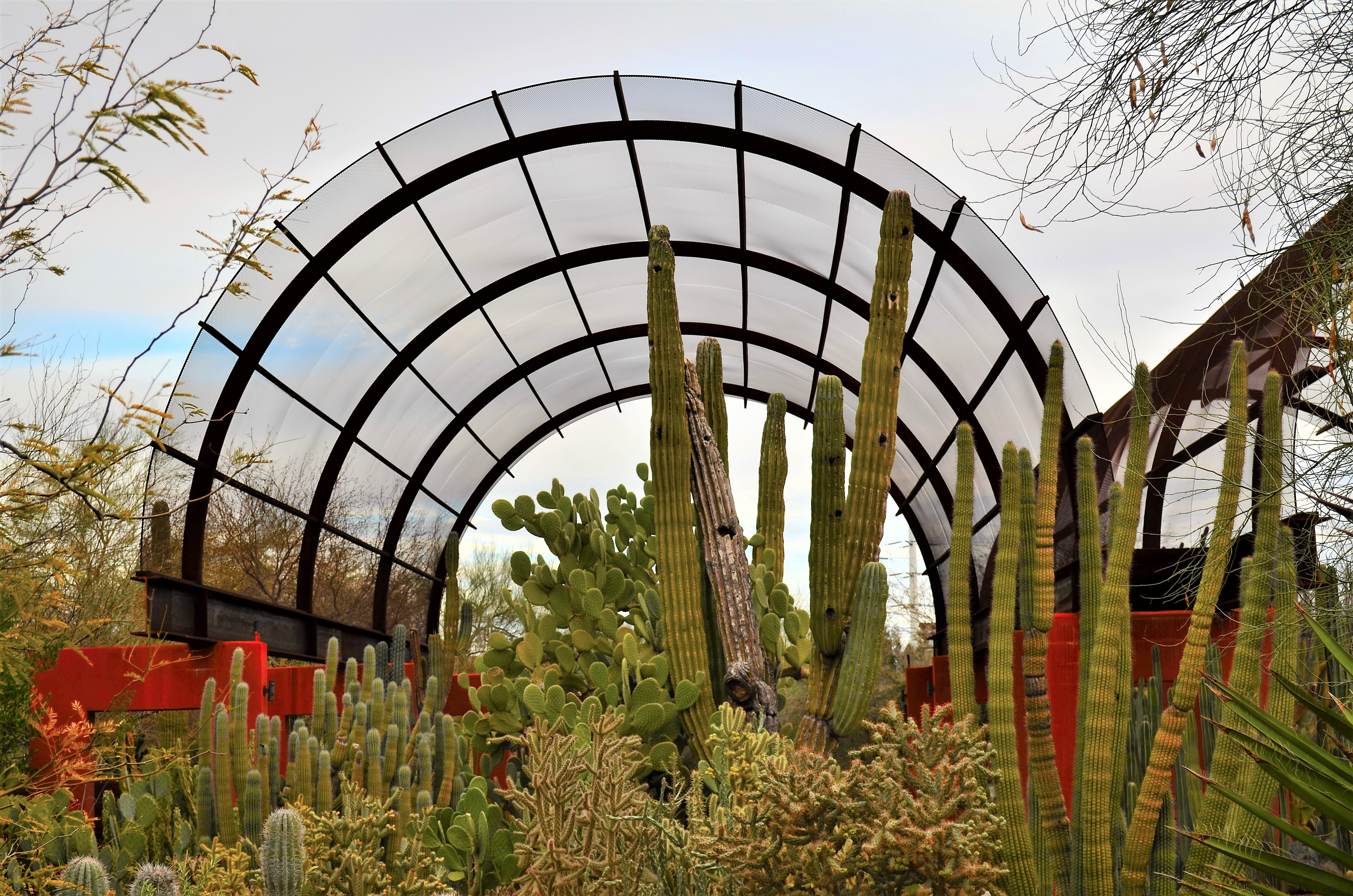
- Desert Botanical Garden

- Location within Arizona Location within the United States
- Location: Phoenix, Arizona, US
- Coordinates: 33°27′43″N 111°56′41″W
- Area: 140 acres (57 ha)
- Established: 1939
- Founder: Arizona Cactus and Native Flora Society
- Habitats: Bosque; semidesert grassland; chaparral
- Plants: 50,000
- Species: 4,379
- Collections: Australian; Baja California; South American
- Website: dbg.org

Desert Botanical Garden is a 140-acre (57 ha) botanical garden located in Papago Park, at 1201 N. Galvin Parkway in Phoenix, central Arizona.

Founded by the Arizona Cactus and Native Flora Society in 1937 and established at this site in 1939, the garden now has more than 50,000 plants in more than 4,000 taxa, one-third of which are native to the area, including 379 species which are rare, threatened or endangered.

Of special note are the rich collections of agave (4,026 plants in 248 taxa) and cacti (13,973 plants in 1,320 taxa), especially the Opuntia sub-family. Plants from less extreme climate conditions are protected under shadehouses. It focuses on plants adapted to desert conditions, including an Australian collection, a Baja California collection and a South American collection. Several ecosystems are represented: a mesquite bosque, semi-desert grassland, and upland chaparral.

Desert Botanical Garden has been designated as a Phoenix Point of Pride.

== History ==
In the 1930s, a small group of local citizens became interested in conserving the fragile desert environment. One was Swedish botanist Gustaf Starck, who found like-minded residents by posting a sign, "Save the desert", with an arrow pointing to his home. In April 1934 they formed the Arizona Cactus and Native Flora Society (ACNFS) to sponsor a botanical garden to encourage an understanding, appreciation and promotion of the uniqueness of the world's deserts, particularly the local Sonoran Desert.

Eventually Gertrude Webster, whose home encompassed all of what is today the neighborhood of Arcadia, joined the Society. She offered her encouragement, connections and financial support to establish the botanical garden in Papago Park. Margaret Bell Douglas provided support as well, donating 1,500 specimens to the herbarium.

Webster served as president of the Society's first Board of Directors and Gustaf Starck, W. E. Walker, Rell Hasket, L. L. Kreigbaum, and Samuel Wilson were the five vice president. The latter also served as Treasurer. Paul G. Olsen was Secretary. In 1938, after much work by the ACNFS, the board hired the Garden's first executive director, George Lindsay, who oversaw the first planting on the grounds. The Desert Botanical Garden opened in 1939 as a non-profit museum dedicated to research, education, conservation and display of desert plants.

== Education and art ==
The Garden offers specialized tours, workshops and lectures on desert landscaping and horticulture, nature art and photography, health and wellness.

The Garden presents Spring and Fall open-air acoustic concert series, art exhibitions, and Las Noches de las Luminarias since 1978. The Luminarias Festival became a Southwestern Holiday tradition featuring live music by the flickering lights of 8000 hand-lit luminaria.

The Garden commissioned "Desert Pulse", a multimedia art exhibition by London-based artists ScanLAB Projects that premiered on October 11, 2025. The exhibition featured five large-scale video installations created using thousands of high resolution images, photography, motion, and sound. Developed over three years, the project used three-dimensional light detection and ranging (LiDAR) scanning at locations across the Sonoran Desert. The technology captured changes in the desert over the course of a year, including cactus blooms, sediment flows and seasonal changes.

== Gallery ==
Desert Botanical Garden
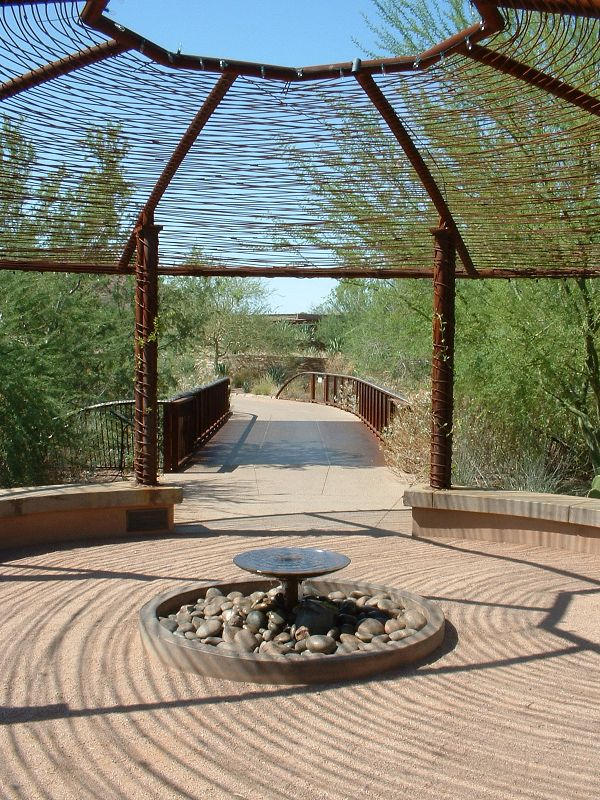
Desert Botanical Garden

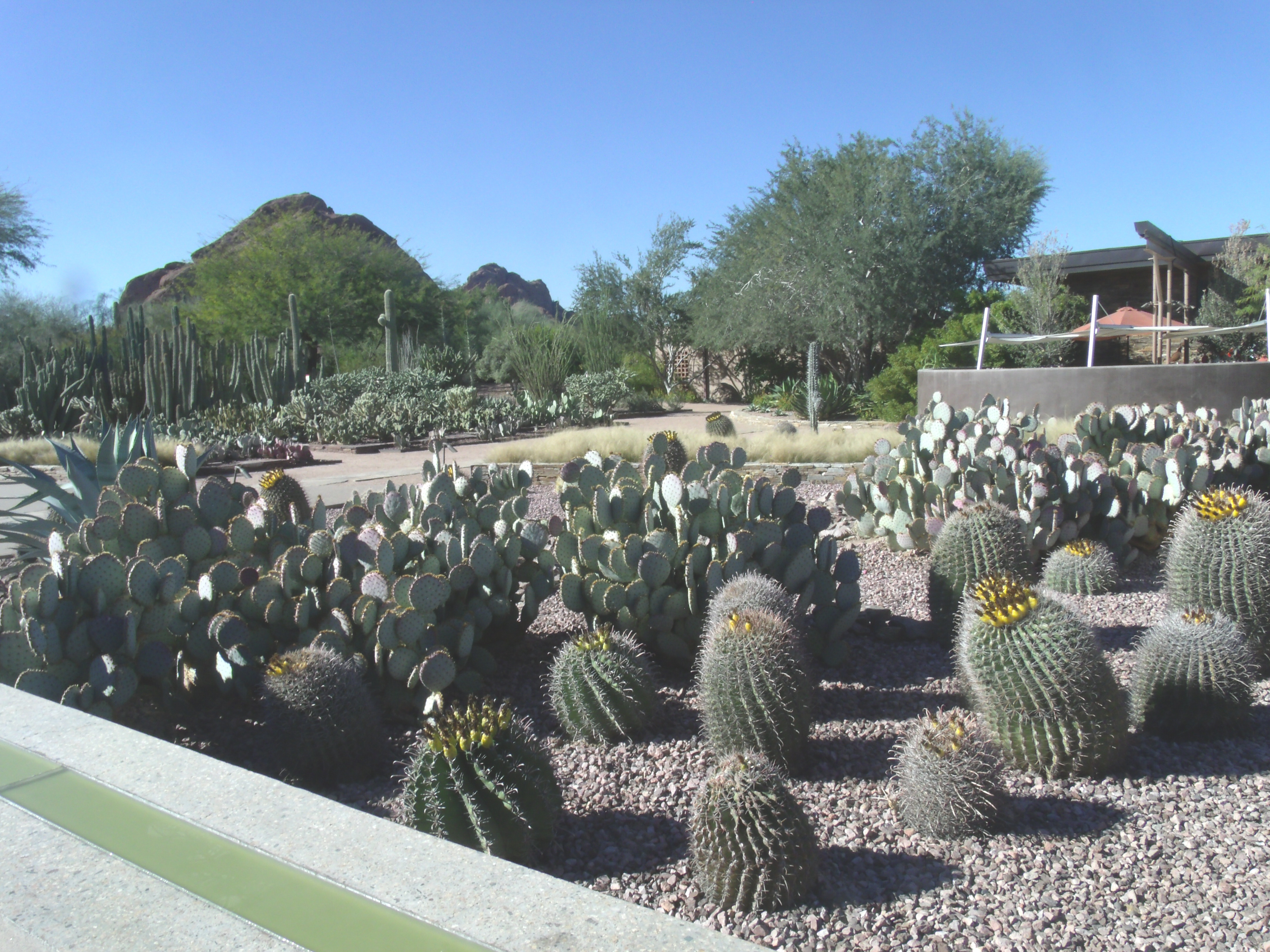
Different species of cacti on display in the Desert Botanical Garden of Phoenix

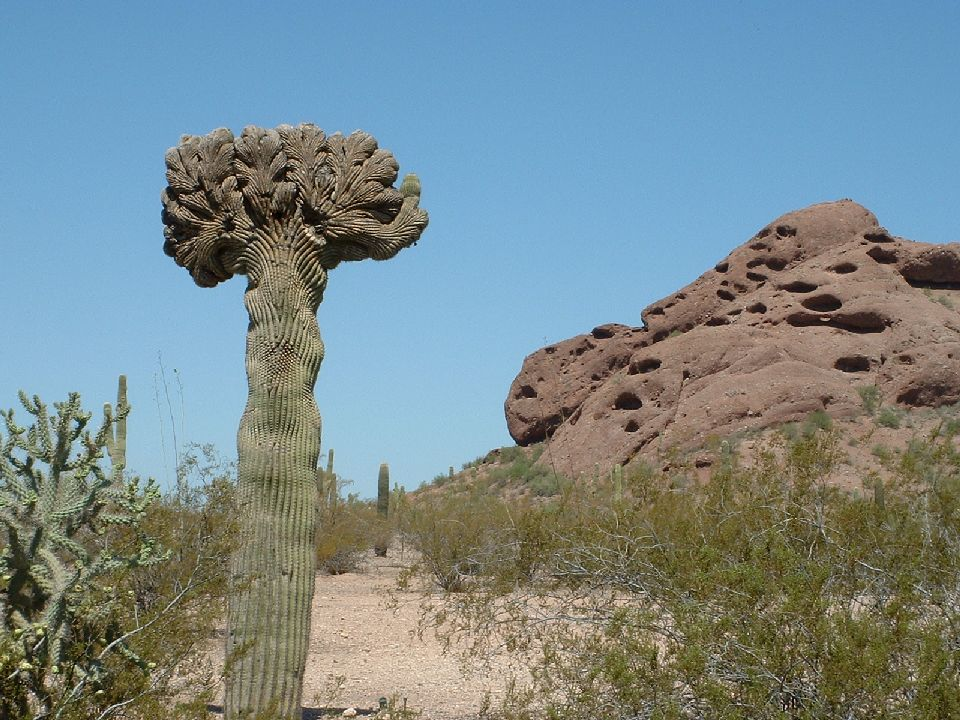
A rare cristate Saguaro cactus

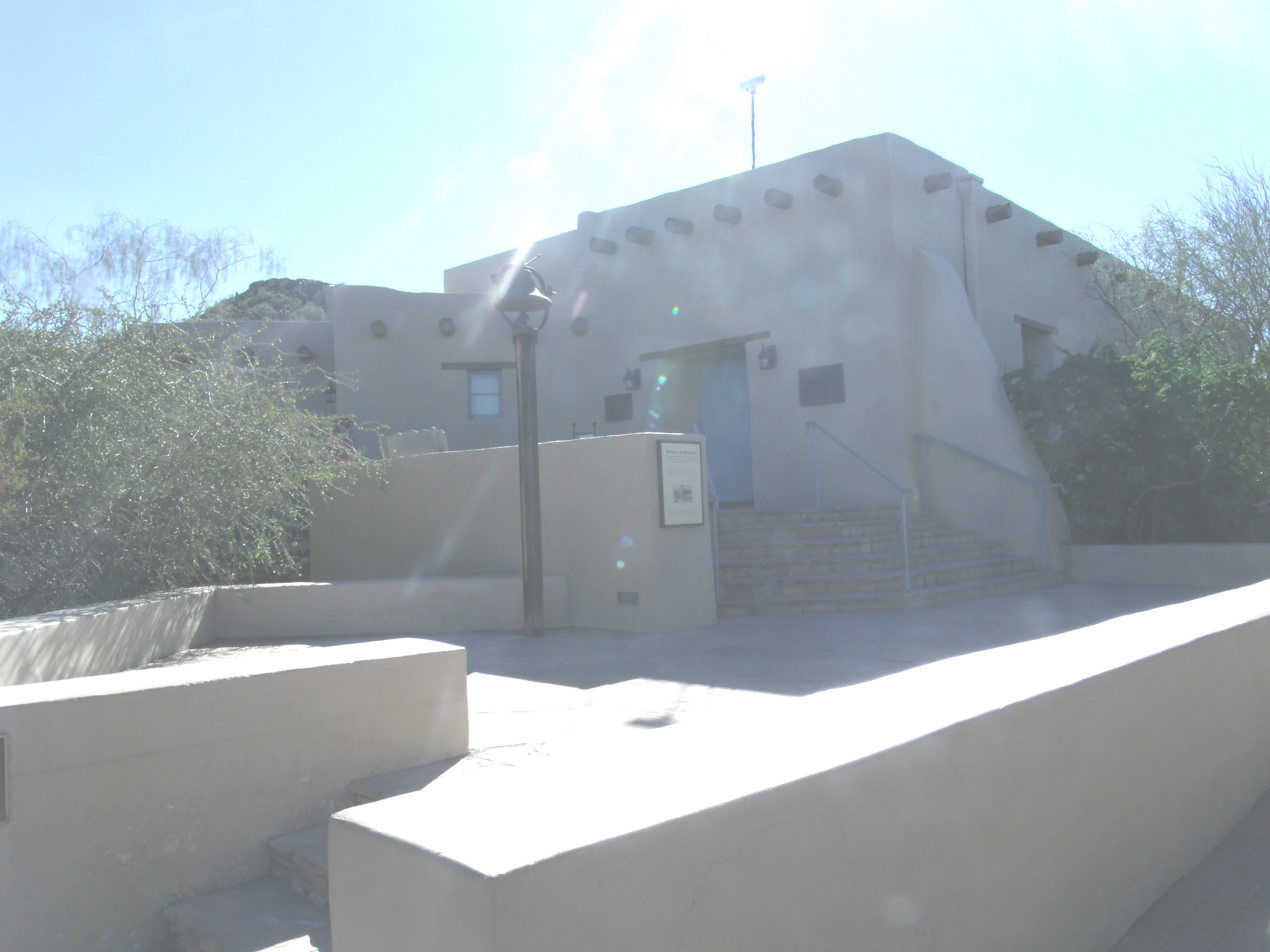
Webster Auditorium

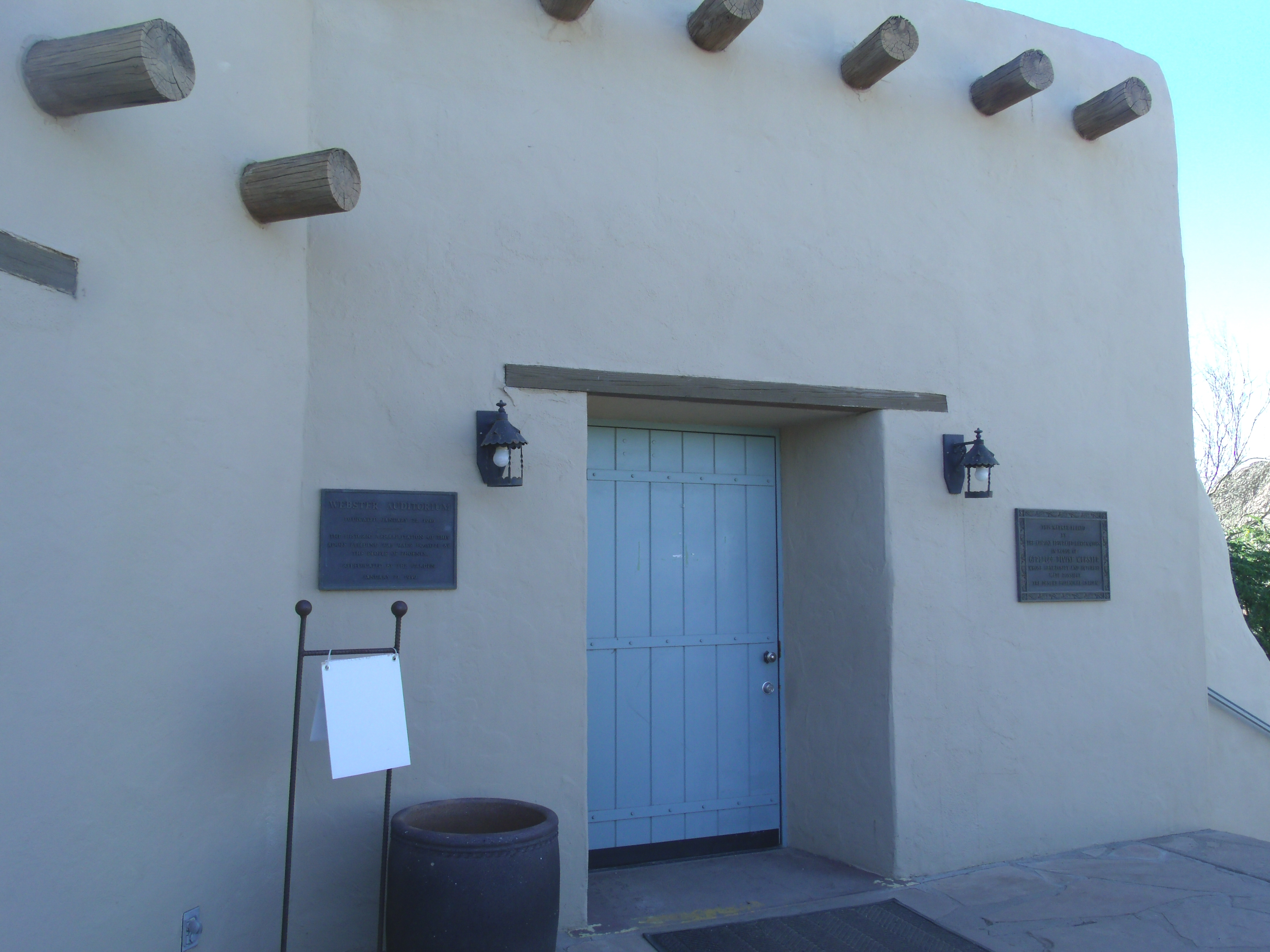
The Webster Auditorium building was constructed in 1939 and is located inside the compounds of the Desert Botanical Garden. In 1937, Gertrude Webster joined newly established Arizona Cactus and Native Flora Society. The auditorium is named after her. In 1990, the National Park Service certified Webster Auditorium as a national historic site and assigned it the reference number 9000823.

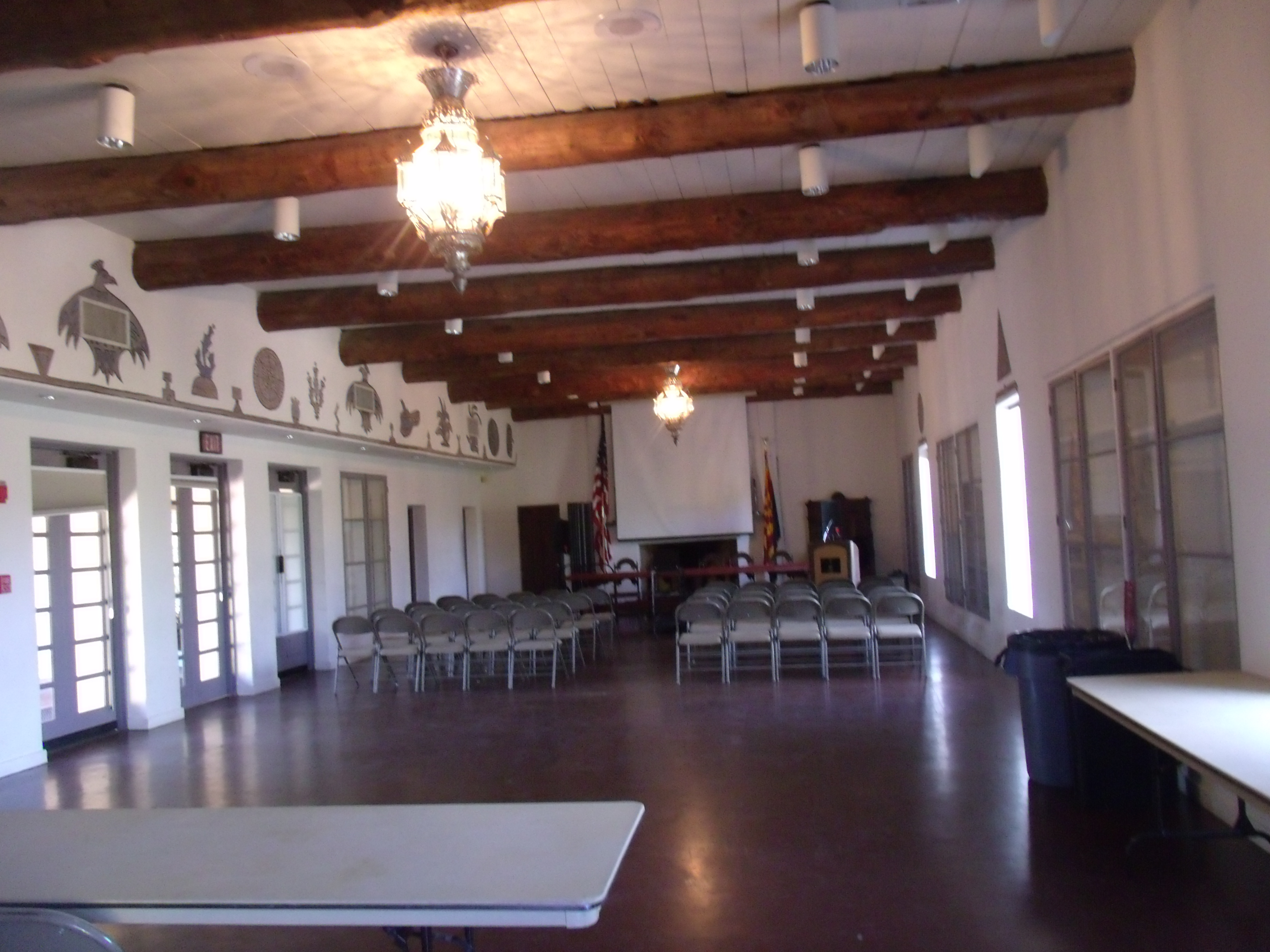
Inside the historic Webster Auditorium. The auditorium was listed in the National Register of Historic Places on May 1, 1990, ref: 9000823.

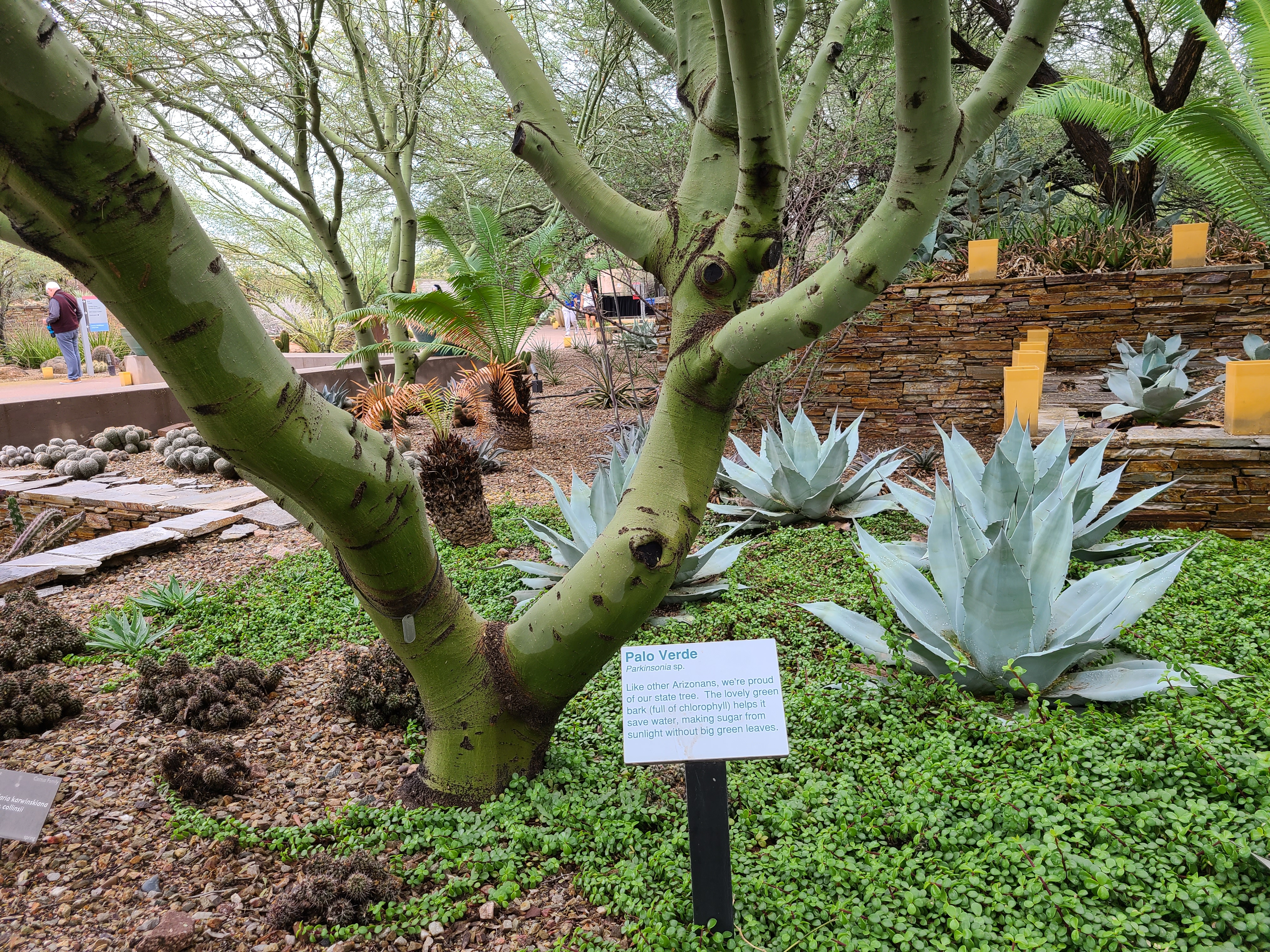
Parkinsonia microphylla at the Desert Botanical Garden

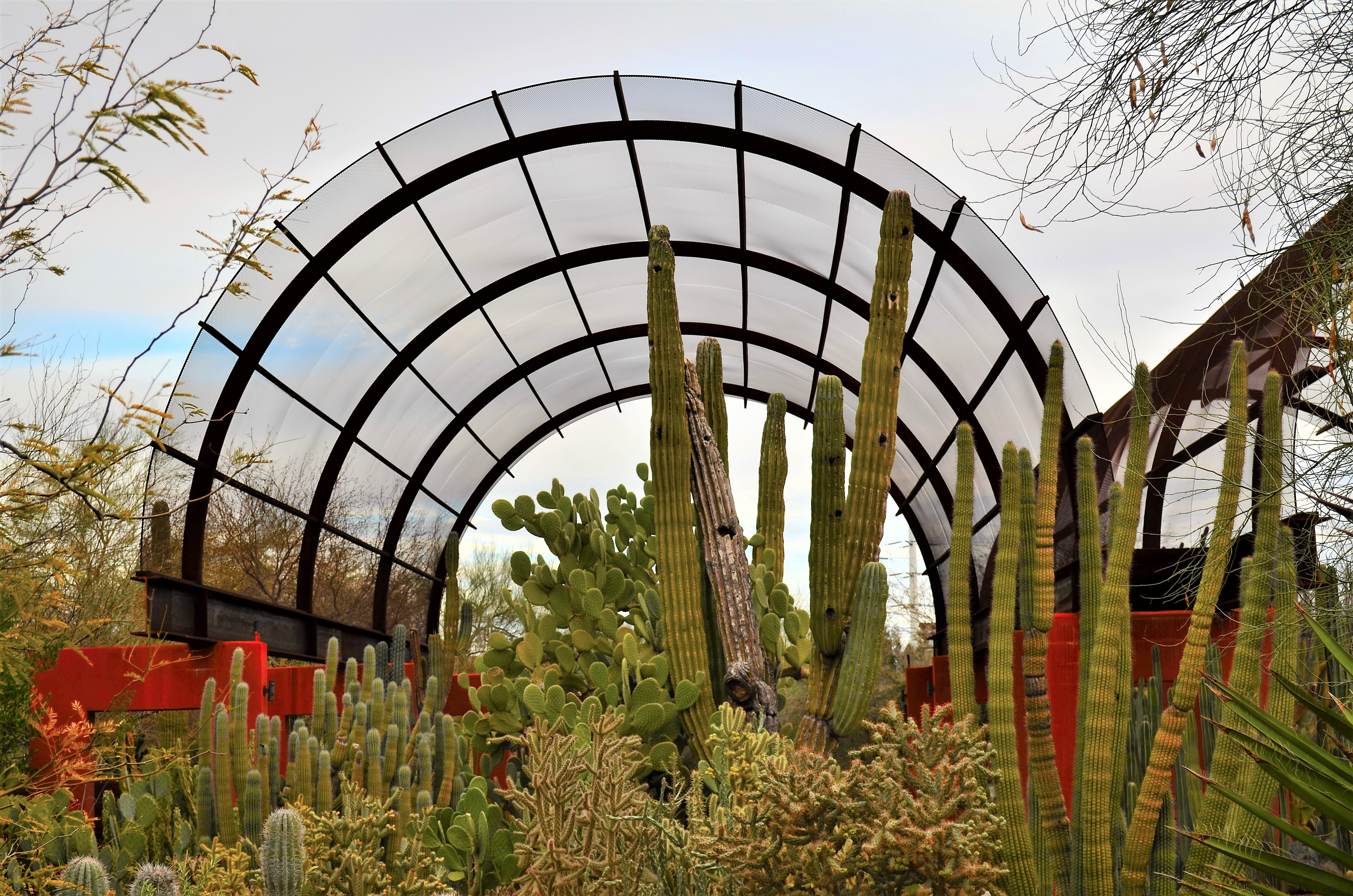
Cactus display

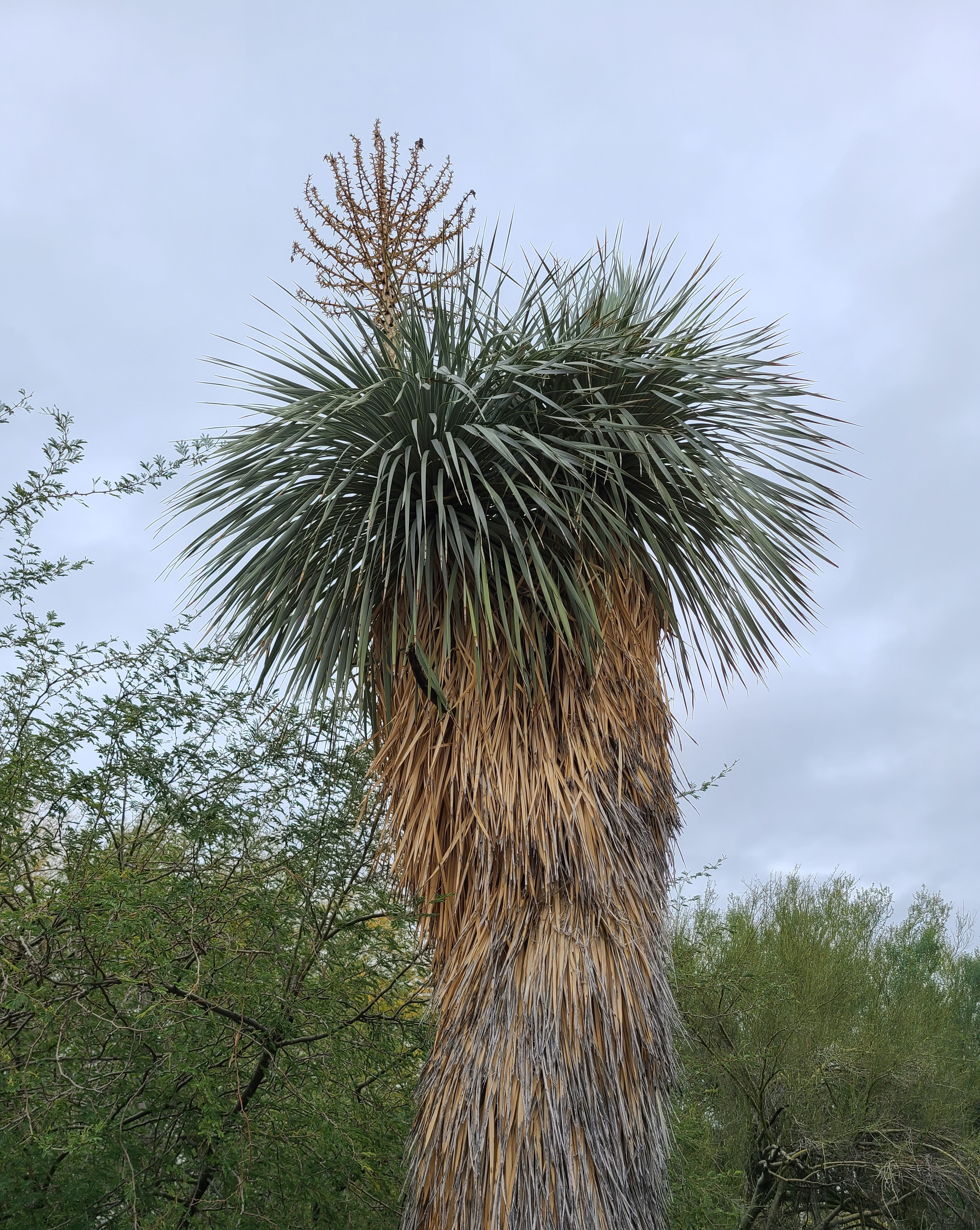
Yucca rostrata (beaked yucca)

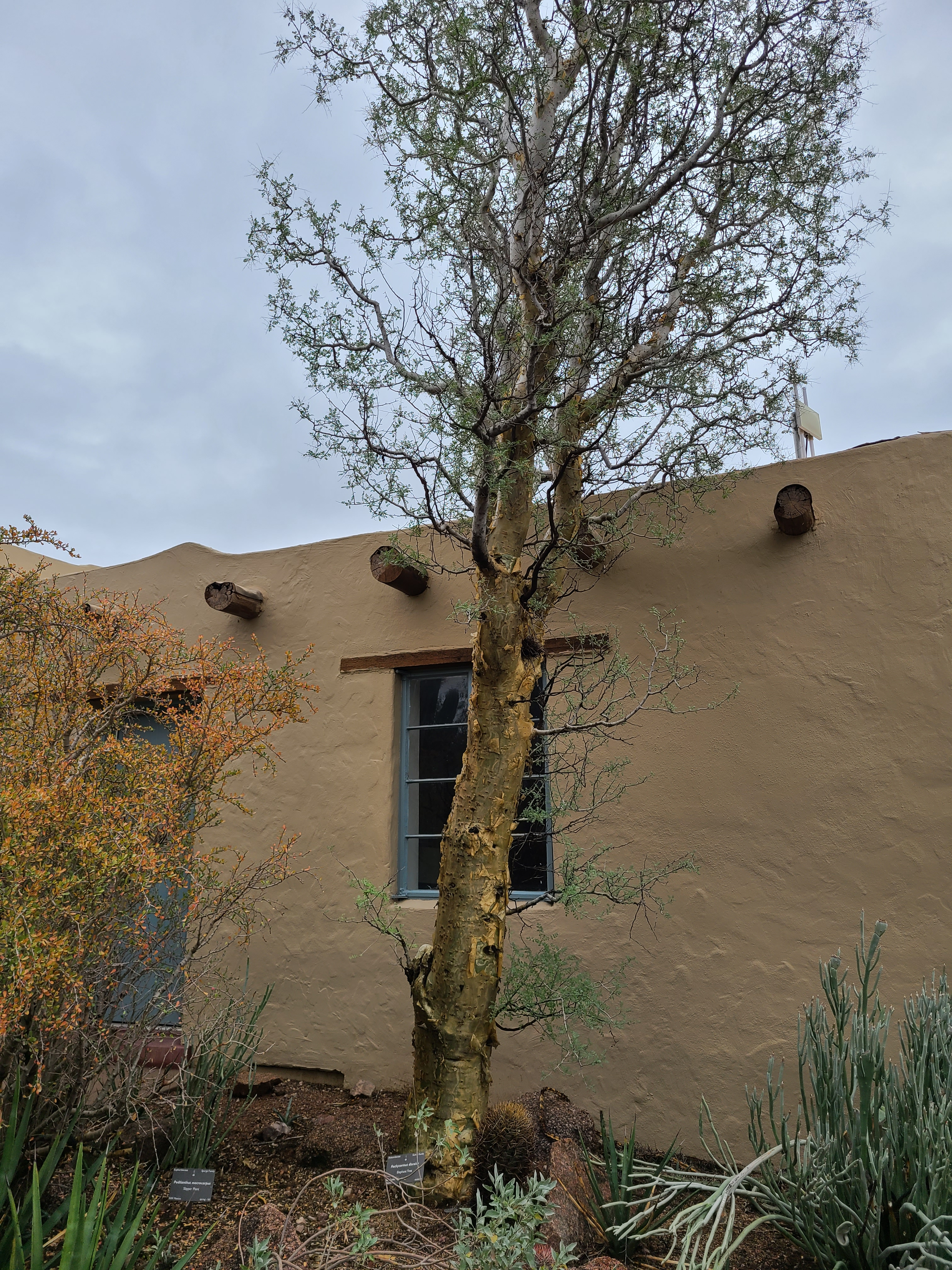
Pachycormus discolor (elephant tree)

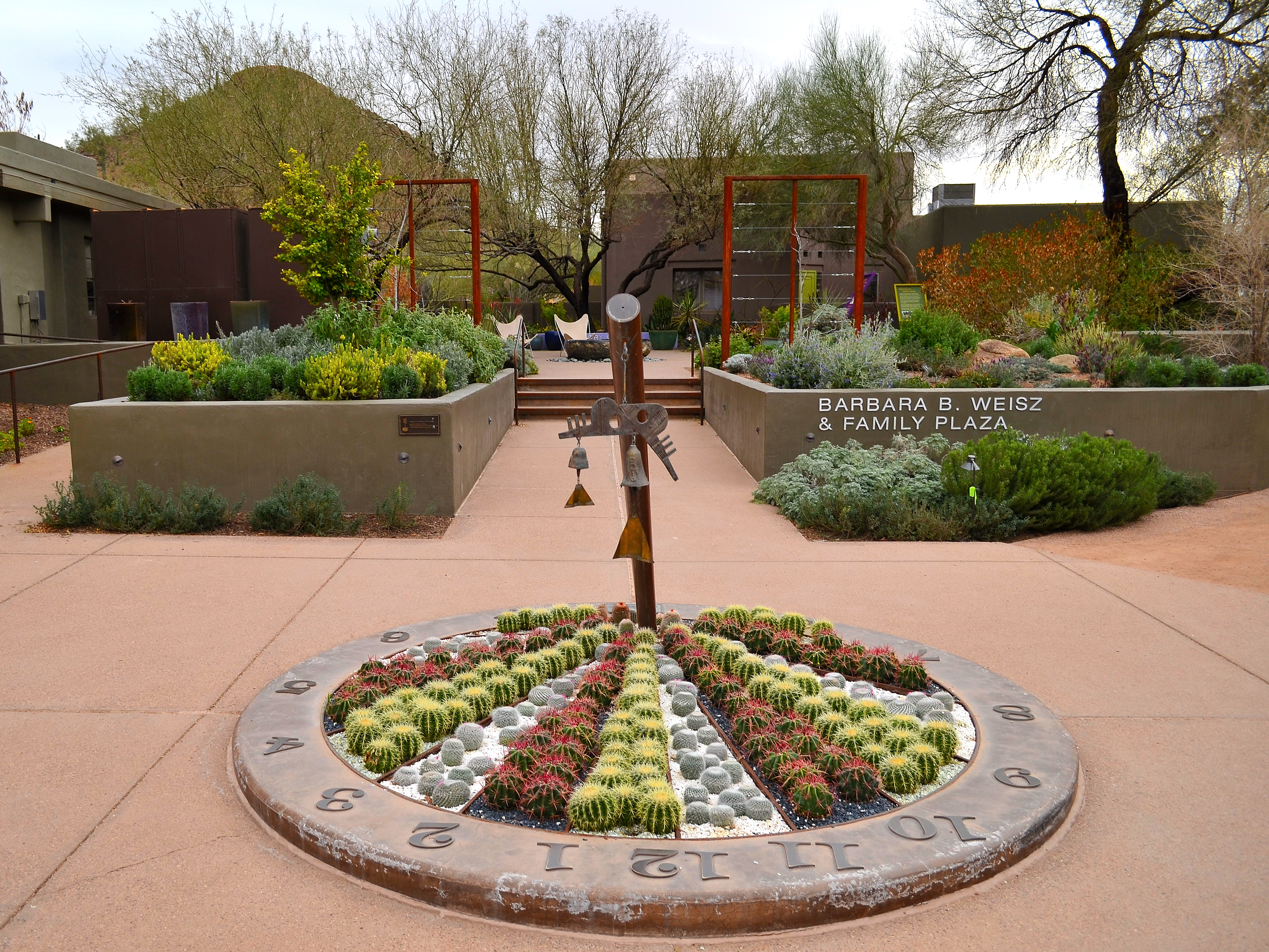
The Weisz Family Plaza

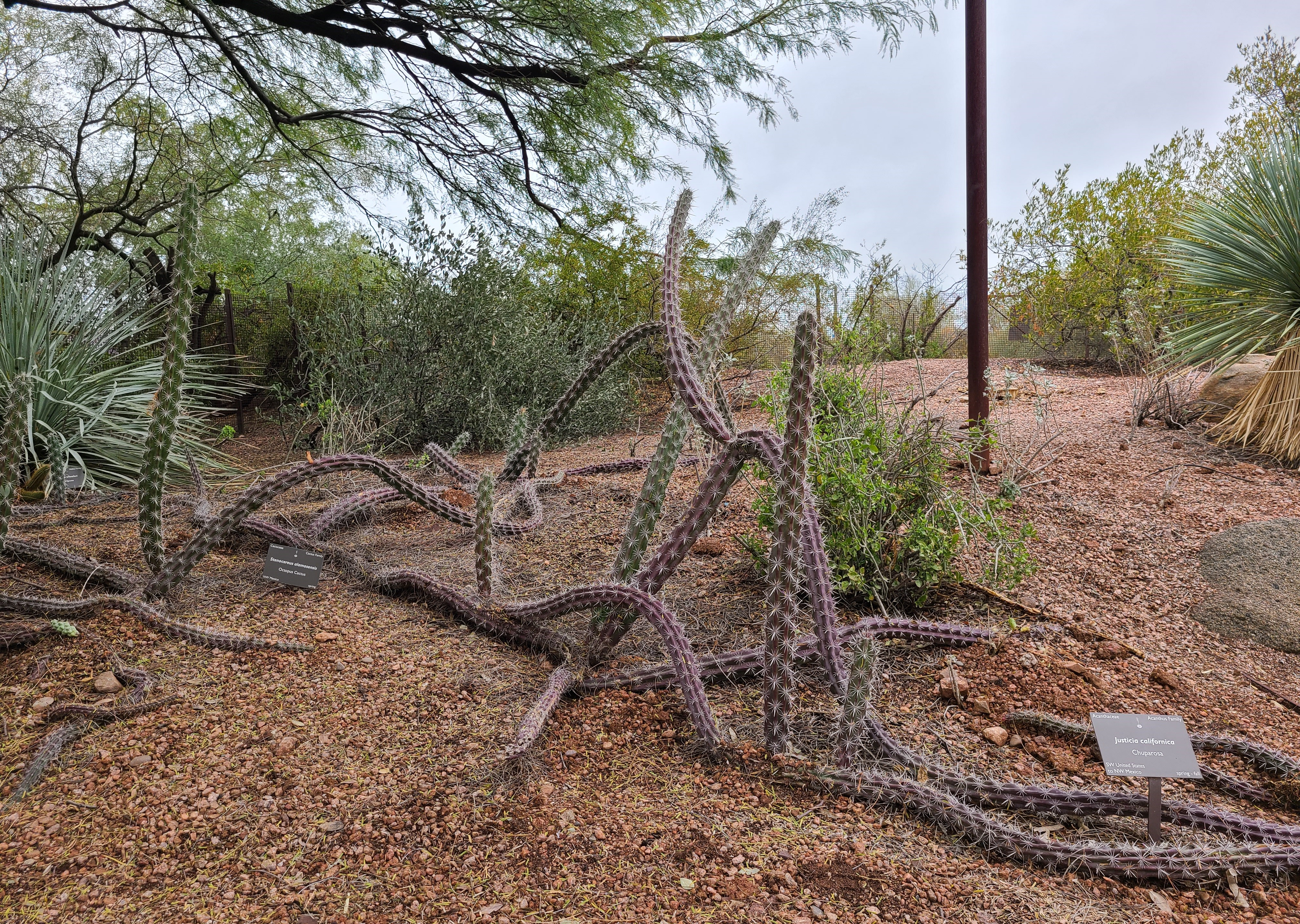
Justicia californica

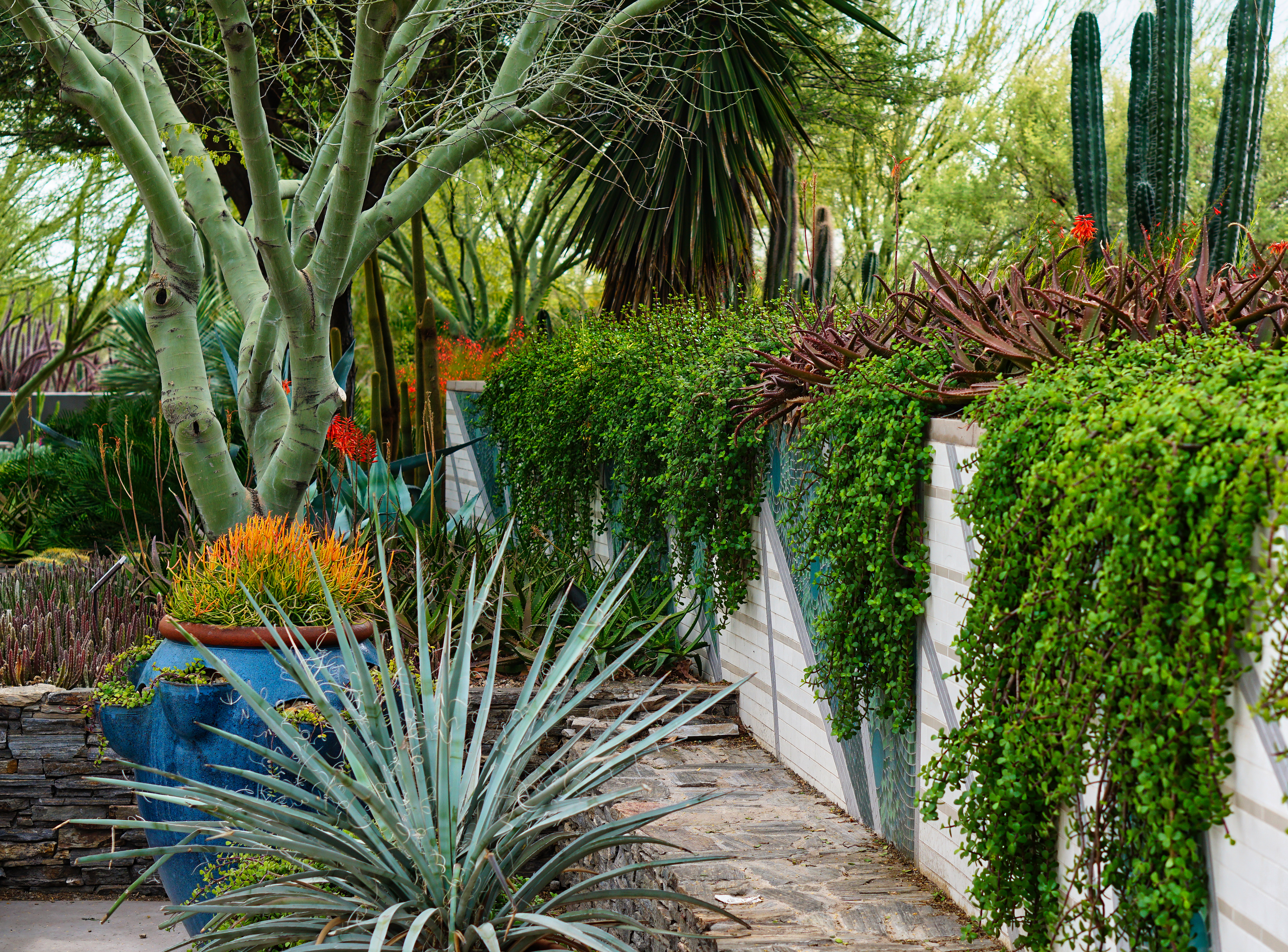
Cacti and succulents display

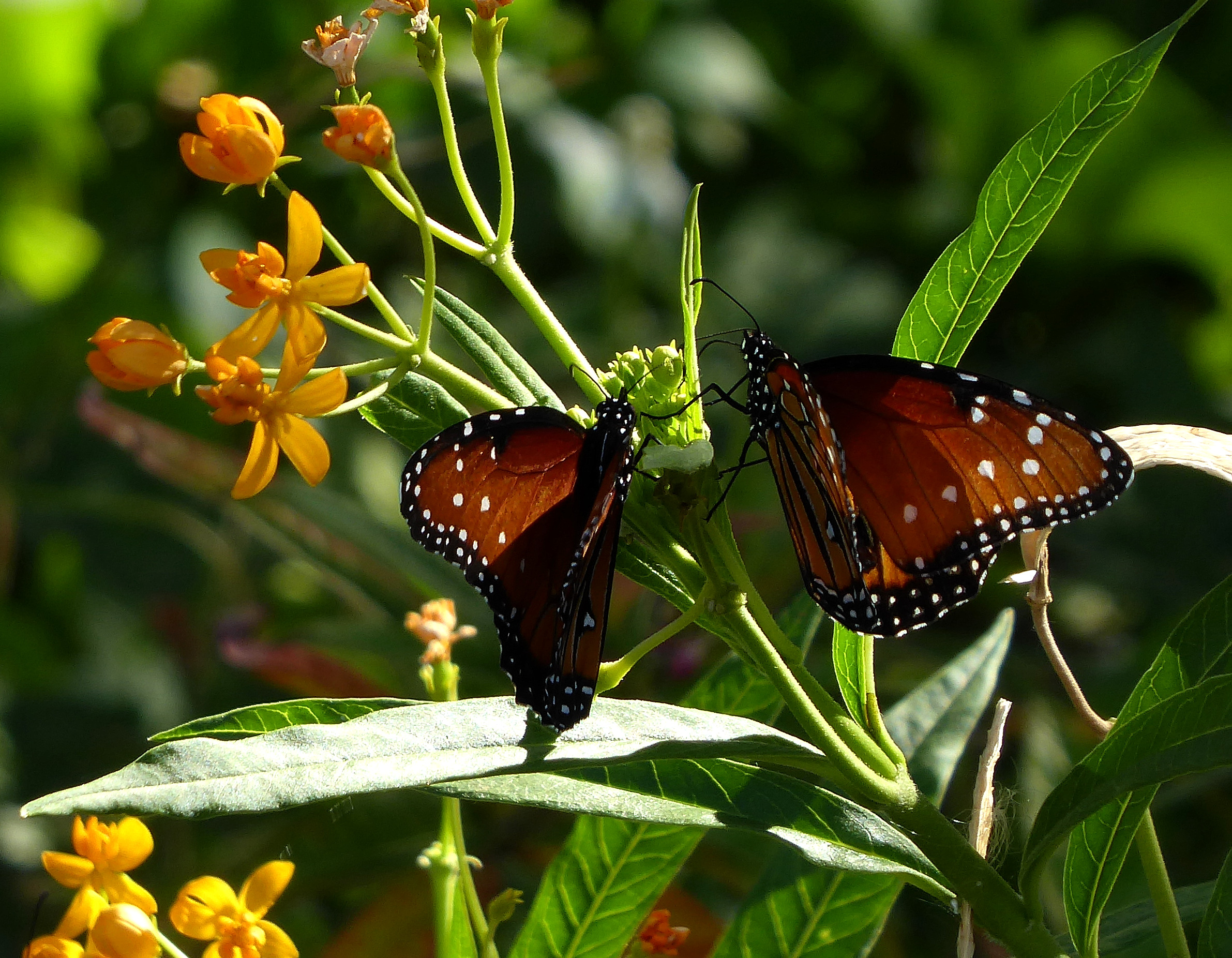
Butterfly pavilion

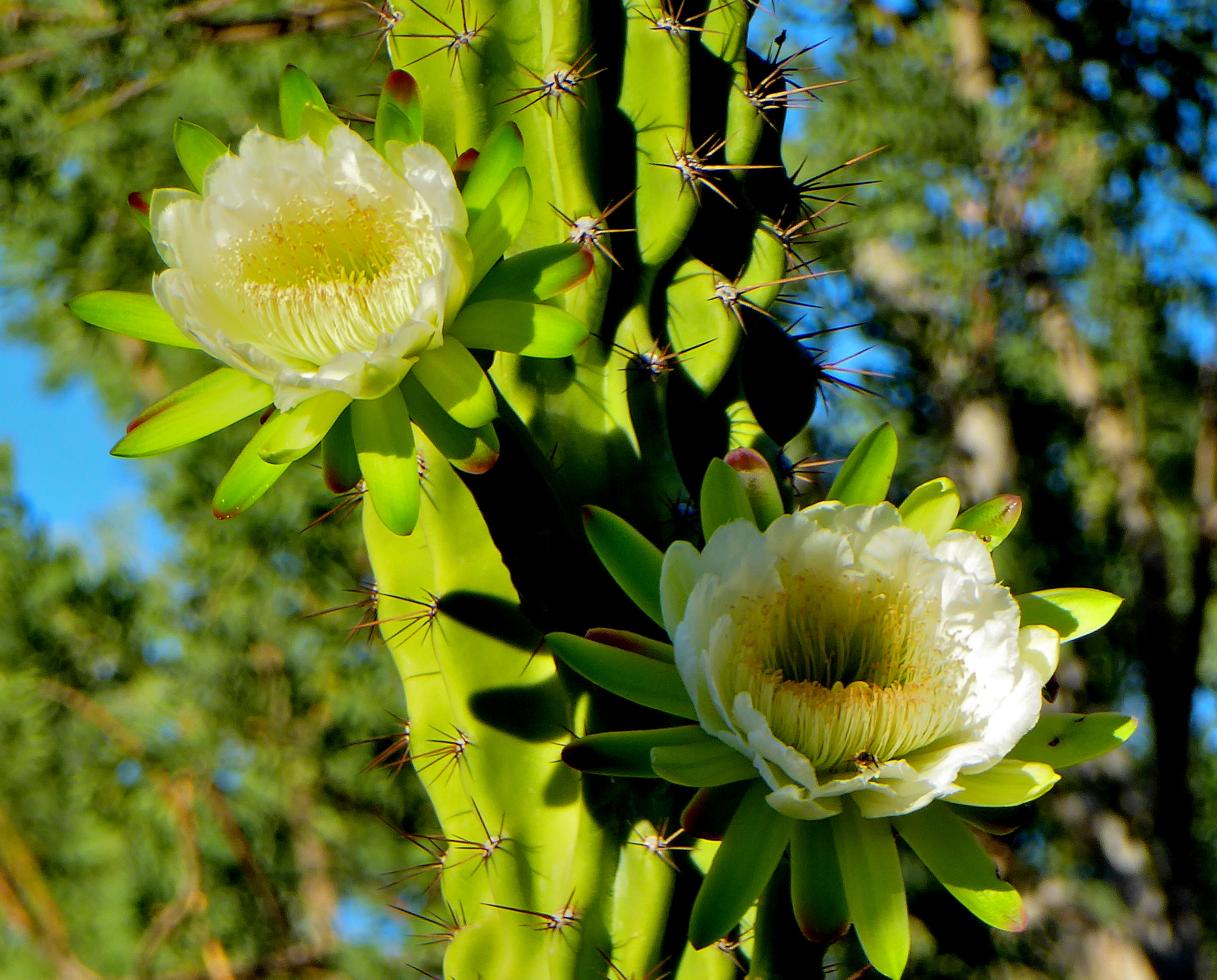
Cactus flowers

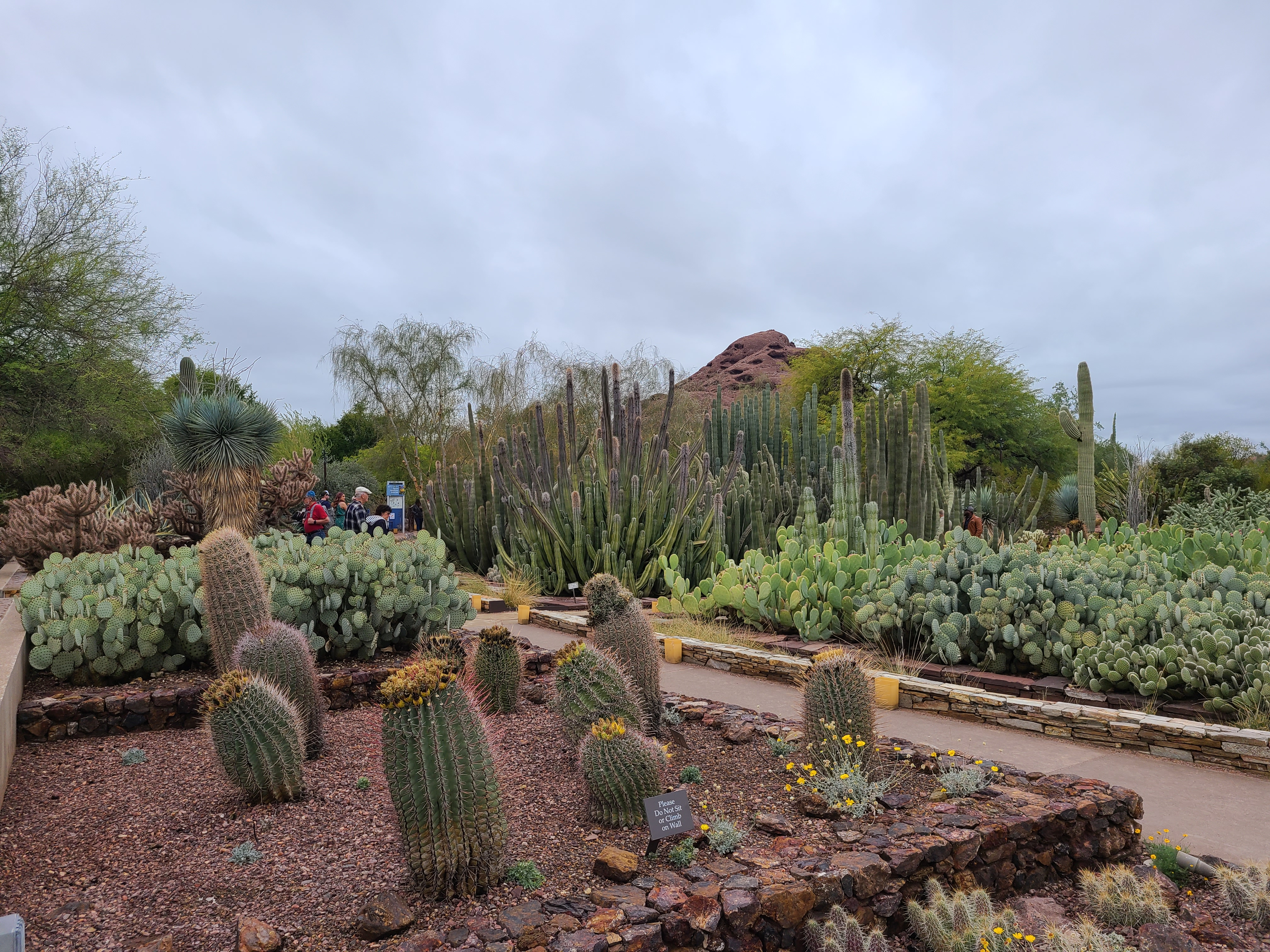
There is a great variety of cacti at the Desert Botanical Garden.

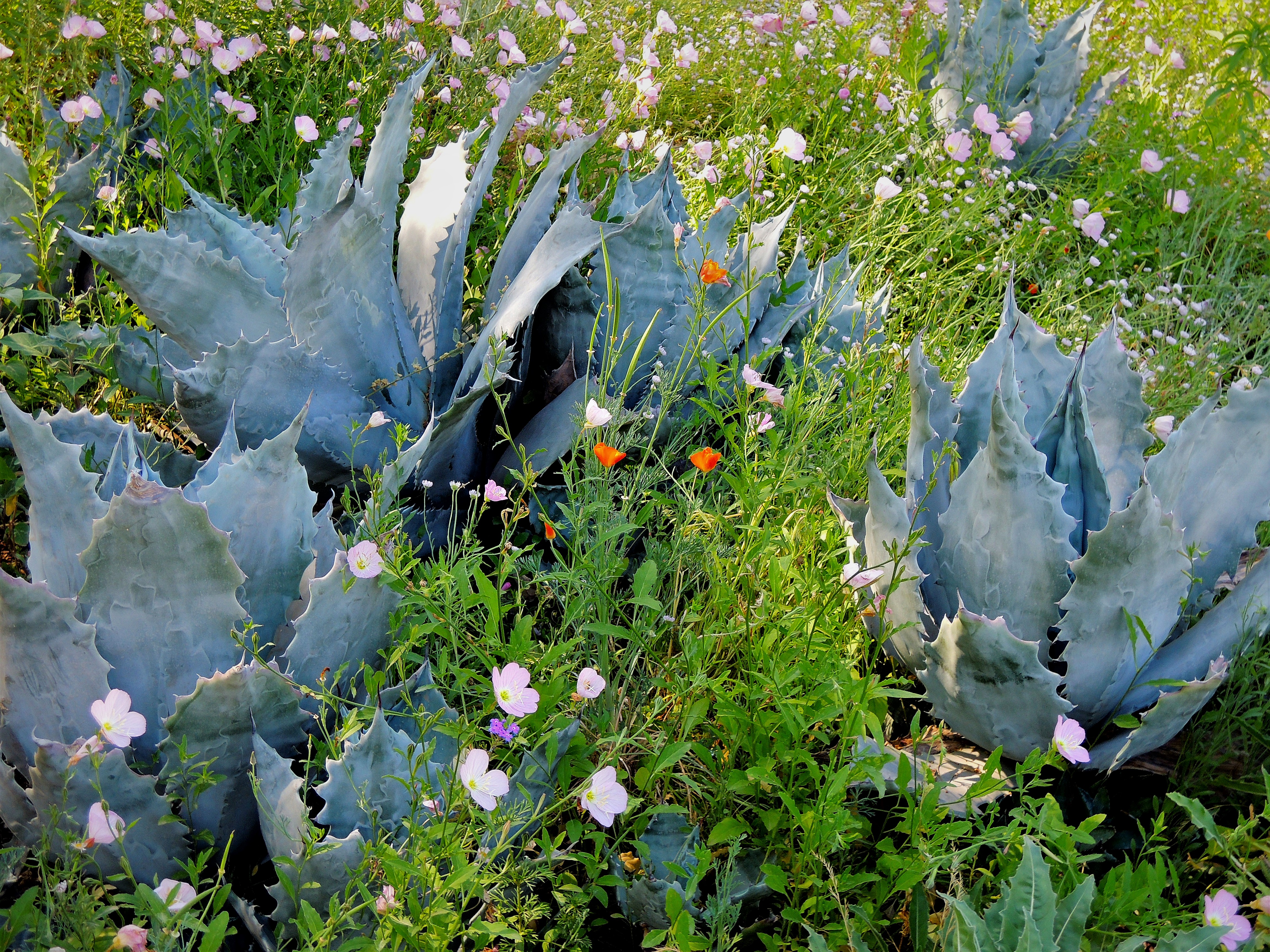
Wildflower garden

== See also ==
- List of botanical gardens and arboretums in Arizona
- List of historic properties in Phoenix, Arizona
- List of botanical gardens in the United States
