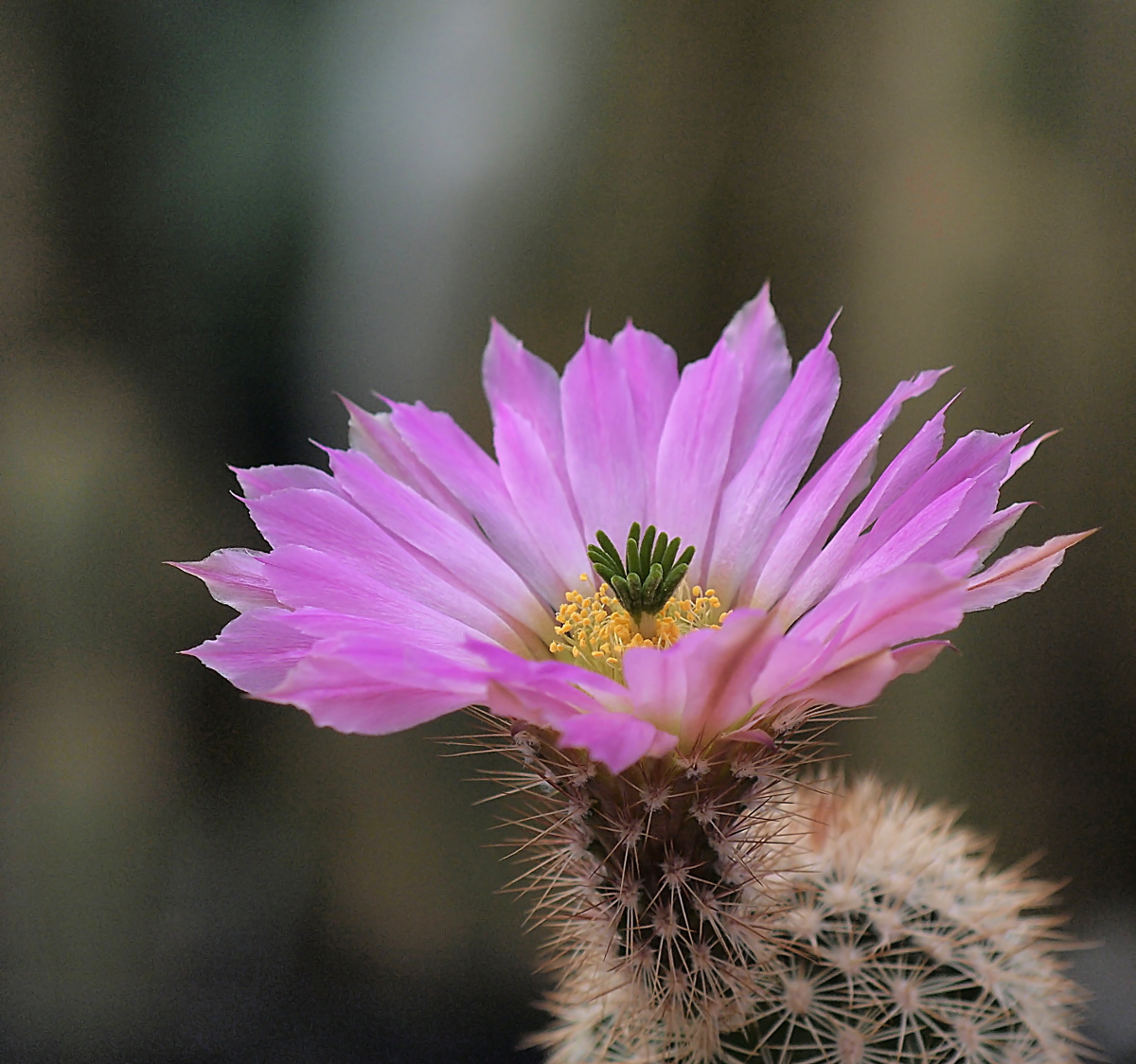
- In bloom

Conservation status
- Near Threatened (IUCN 3.1)

Scientific classification
- Kingdom: Plantae
- Clade: Tracheophytes
- Clade: Angiosperms
- Clade: Eudicots
- Order: Caryophyllales
- Family: Cactaceae
- Subfamily: Cactoideae
- Genus: Echinocereus
- Species: E. websterianus

Binomial name
- Echinocereus websterianus G.E. Linds

= Echinocereus websterianus =

Species of cactus in Mexico

Echinocereus websterianus, commonly known as the San Pedro Nolasco hedgehog cactus or Webster's hedgehog cactus, is a species of cactus. It is named after American philanthropist Gertrude Webster, who cofounded the Desert Botanical Garden in Phoenix, Arizona.

== Description ==
Webster's hedgehog is a short barrel cactus growing up to 60 cm (24 in) tall (though usually specimens are shorter) and 6–8 cm (2.4–3.1 in) in diameter. It may grow in a clumping fashion, with up to 50 other basal branches forming the clump. Golden yellow, brown, or white spines grow about 1 cm (0.39 in) long from closely spaced areoles. The pink, violet, or white flower blooms during the day. Flowers are small for the genus, only about 3–4 cm (1.2–1.6 in) in diameter and 6 cm (2.4 in) long from where it branches off the cactus. Flowers do not readily detach once pollinated, which can lead to stem rot. Blooming occurs in the hot months of June and July, once the plant reaches maturity at between 7 and 10 years old. Blooms stay open for 2 or 3 days.

== Taxonomy ==
This species was first described by George Edmund Lindsay was published in 1947.

== Distribution ==
It is likely native to San Pedro Nolasco Island in the Gulf of California, though it may have some distribution in mainland Baja. It occurs on other islands in the Gulf of California, including Isla San Lorenzo Sur and Isla Las Ánimas growing on rocky slopes at elevations of up to 350 m. The plant is found growing along Agave chrysoglossa, Mammillaria multidigitata, and Opuntia bravoana.

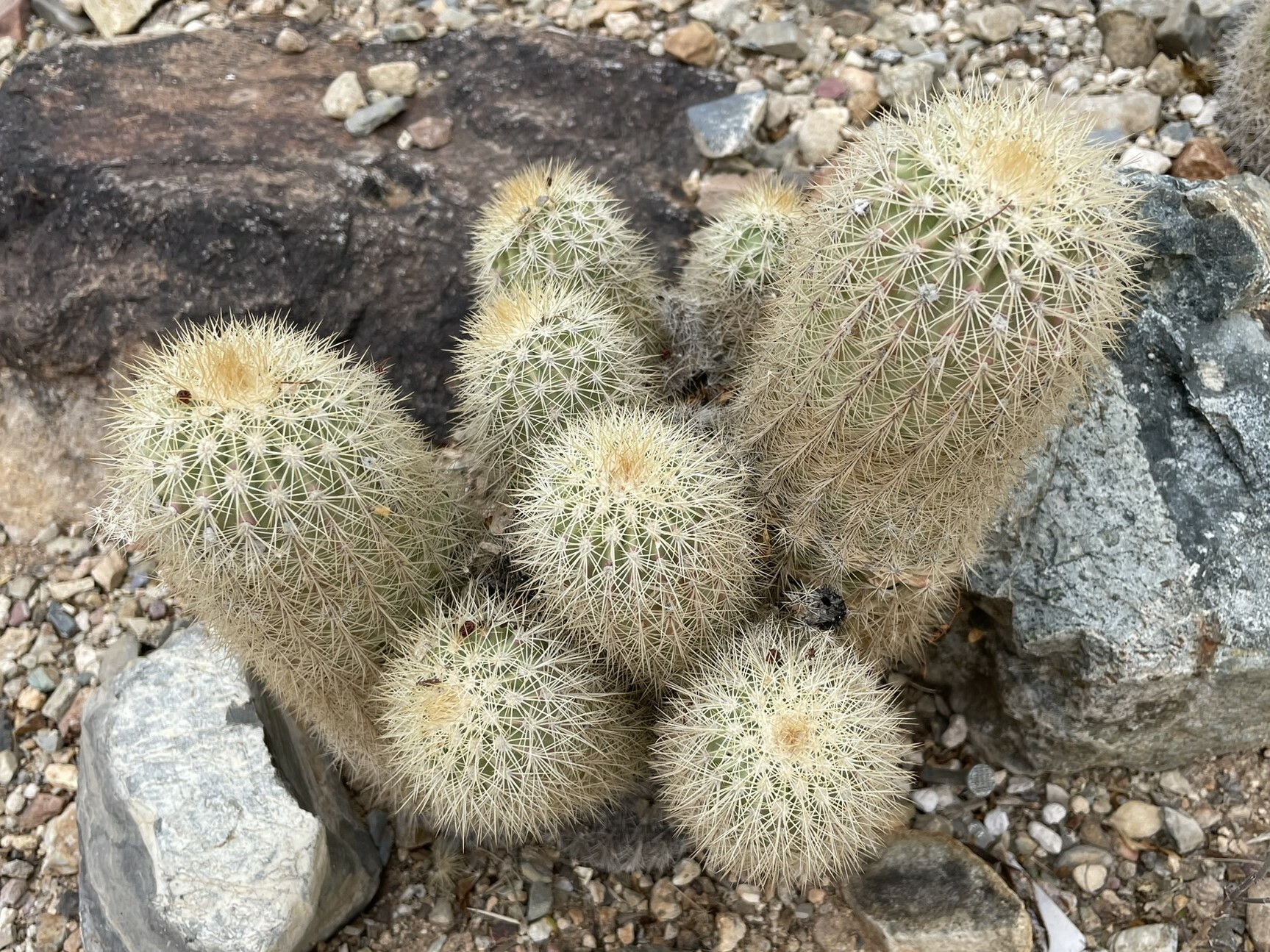
Echinocereus websterianus habitat in Pima County, Arizona

== Cultivation ==
This cactus is easily propagated, but its slow maturation complicates cultivation. It fetches a high price due to its showy flowers. In cultivation, it should be watered regularly between March and October, and given a deep pot to ensure adequate drainage. Strong sunlight overwinter is necessary to ensure flowering. It requires a greenhouse in cold climates, as it can only survive to −5 °C (23 °F) for short periods of time. It is very difficult to repot and shows handling marks with even a ginger touch. Instead it is preferable to simply cut off pups or the top of the plant and propagate those.
