= Guaymas =

Heroica Guaymas
- City
- Heroica Guaymas de Zaragoza
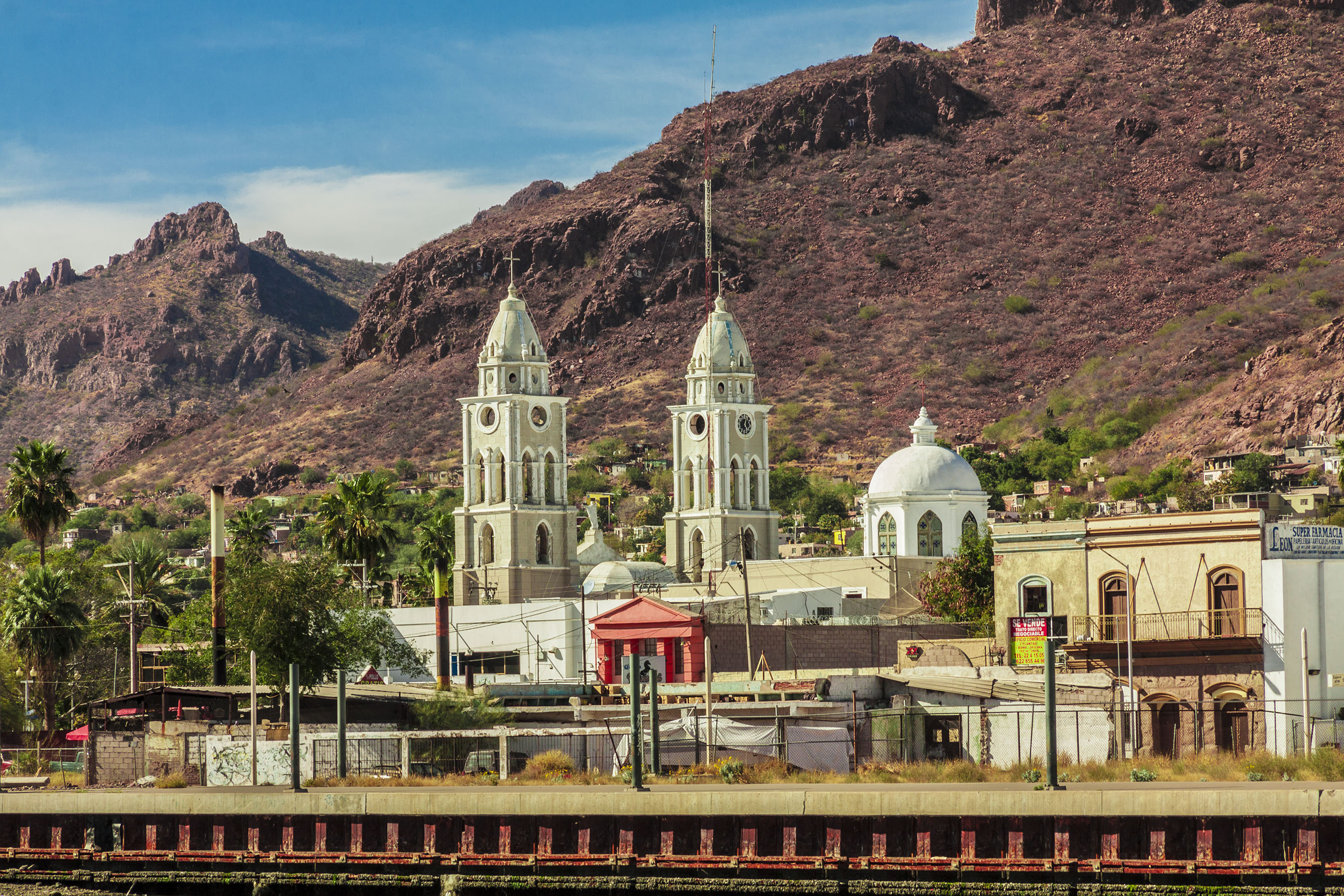
- Parish church of San Fernando

- Coat of arms

- Location within Sonora Location within Mexico
- Coordinates: 27°55′06″N 110°53′56″W
- Country: Mexico
- State: Sonora
- Municipality: Guaymas
- Founded: 1769
- Municipal Status: 1825

Government
  - Municipal president: Karla Córdova González (2021-); Morena
  - Federal electoral district: Sonora's 4th

Area
  - Total: 12,206.18 km^{2} (4,712.83 sq mi)
- Elevation (of seat): 10 m (33 ft)

Population (2020 census)
  - Total: 156,863
  - Seat: 117,253
- Time zone: UTC–07:00 (Zona Pacífico)
- Postal code (of seat): 85400
- Area code: +52 622
- Website: (in Spanish) guaymas.gob.mx

Guaymas (Spanish pronunciation: [ˈgwaj.mas]) is a city in Guaymas Municipality, in the southwest part of the state of Sonora, in northwestern Mexico. The city is 134 kilometres (83 mi) south of the state capital of Hermosillo, and 389 kilometres (242 mi) from the U.S. border. The municipality's formal name is Guaymas de Zaragoza and the city's formal name is the Heroica Ciudad de Guaymas.

The city proper is mostly an industrial port and is the principal port for the state of Sonora. The city has a well-attended annual carnival, which has been held since 1888. Nearby, San Carlos and its beaches are major tourist attractions.

== History ==
Before the arrival of the Europeans, the bay of Guaymas was dominated by the Guaymas, Seri and Yaqui tribes. In 1539, two Spanish ships, the Santa Águeda and the Trinidad, arrived in Guaymas Bay. They were commanded by Francisco de Ulloa, who called the area "the port of ports."

Some small Jesuit missions were founded in the 1610s and 1620s, when Jesuits founded eight mission villages with the Yaqui. The Seri strongly opposed the European settlements and resisted fiercely until 1769.

Juan María de Salvatierra and Eusebio Kino asked for permission to evangelize the area, which was received in 1697. In 1701, Salvatierra established the Loreto mission somewhat inland of Guaymas Bay. To receive supplies by ship and evangelize the Guaymas Indians, the Jesuits founded another small mission on the bay, called San José de Guaymas. It was headed by Manuel Diaz. The Seri repeatedly attacked the San José mission, forcing it to be rebuilt several times. This mission was abandoned permanently in 1759.

In 1767, Viceroy Marqués de Croix ordered a major military offensive, the Sonora Expedition, to subdue the Seri and Pima tribes. After doing so, the Spanish colonials built an adobe fort with four towers in Guaymas under the command of Captain Lorenzo Cancio. No traces of the fort remain today, but the San José mission is marked by a church located on the road leading to Empalme. Around the same time, the colonists mapped Guaymas Bay. Guaymas was declared a city in 1769 by José Gálvez from Real de Álamos on behalf of the viceregal government. Despite the decree, no colonists settled there until the early 19th century.

In the late 18th and early 19th century, there was reportedly a single inhabitant of Guaymas, "Tio Pepe" (Uncle Pepe), said to be a drunk and a thief. At the beginning of the 19th century, the village was settled by farmers and ranchers holding large properties but having no market for their products. Farming was on a subsistence level. In 1811, commercial maritime traffic was authorized. Guaymas received the name San Fernando de Guaymas in 1820 and customs was established in 1823. Ships visited the bay intermittently, and there was one customs house. During this era, it was safer to travel by sea than by land. Guaymas became an important way point for those heading north or south. The first commercial imports came through in 1827. With the population of the area by European-Mexicans, the Guaymas natives moved to the town of Belén. They eventually disappeared as a distinct group.

The port became a municipality in 1825. During the Mexican–American War, American warships such as the Portsmouth, the Congress, the Dale and the Argos anchored near Isla Pájaros and Isla Almagre Grande. The ships fired on and captured the town, keeping it in U.S. hands from 1847 to 1848.

In the mid-19th century, Guaymas was the target of several filibusters, or unauthorized military expeditions from foreign nations, designed to foment rebellion. One was by the crew of the English sailing vessel Challenge and the French ship La Belle, commanded by Count Gastón Raousett-Boulbón, who intended to control all of Sonora. The French attacked the city on 13 July 1854, but the port was successfully defended by José María Yáñez. A firing squad executed the count soon afterwards. The national government elevated the town to city status as a reward for this action in 1859. In 1935 Guaymas received the title of "heroic city" for the same action. The municipality's formal name of Guaymas de Zaragoza was authorized in 1862. In 1865, French ships arrived to attack Republican forces, which were forced to retreat. The French occupied the city until 1866.

By 1890, the city had 10,000 residents and was somewhat prosperous. The carnival tradition it established then continues to this day.

On October 4–5, 1911, Guaymas was struck by a major hurricane and accompanying storm surge which killed some 500 people in the city and environs.

During the Mexican Revolution, the first aerial bombardment of a naval target occurred just off the coast of Guaymas. In 1913, five military ships belonging to Federal forces appeared in the bay, and General Álvaro Obregón of the rebel army ordered the bombing of these ships using the aircraft Sonora.

Modern port facilities were built in 1925 for the Mexican navy. In 1942 a commercial pier and warehouse were built at La Ardilla. Guaymas's importance as a port grew in the 1950s, and in 1961, a pier for the national oil company PEMEX was built. A naval ship repair station, called the Varadero Nacional, and silos for the export of grain, called the Almacenes Nacional de Depósito, were built in 1964.

Ferry connection with the city of Santa Rosalía, Baja California Sur was established in 1972. In the 1980s, private construction projects further enlarged the port, including facilities built by the Compañía Mexicana de Cobre, Cementos Tolteca and Compañía Mexicana de Ácido Sulfúrico. Due to changes in Mexican maritime law, a private company under contract to the government, Administración Portuaria Integral de Guaymas, took over port operations in 1995.

== Geography ==
The municipality is located on the Gulf of California and the western edge of the Sonoran Desert and has a hot, dry climate and 117 kilometres (73 mi) of beaches.

=== Climate ===
Guaymas has a desert climate (Köppen climate classification BWh), with hot summers and warm winters. Precipitation peaks during the monsoon months of July to September.

Climate data for Guaymas (Francisco / FFCC), Sonora (normals 1973–2026, extremes 1973–2026, sun/humidity 1951–1980)
Month	Jan	Feb	Mar	Apr	May	Jun	Jul	Aug	Sep	Oct	Nov	Dec	Year
Record high °C (°F)	36.0 (96.8)	41.0 (105.8)	42.0 (107.6)	42.0 (107.6)	45.0 (113.0)	50.0 (122.0)	46.0 (114.8)	46.0 (114.8)	46.0 (114.8)	44.0 (111.2)	40.0 (104.0)	35.0 (95.0)	50.0 (122.0)
Mean daily maximum °C (°F)	25.9 (78.6)	27.5 (81.5)	29.7 (85.5)	32.8 (91.0)	35.8 (96.4)	38.2 (100.8)	38.3 (100.9)	38.1 (100.6)	36.9 (98.4)	34.6 (94.3)	30.6 (87.1)	26.0 (78.8)	32.8 (91.0)
Daily mean °C (°F)	16.8 (62.2)	17.9 (64.2)	19.6 (67.3)	22.2 (72.0)	25.2 (77.4)	29.4 (84.9)	31.2 (88.2)	30.8 (87.4)	29.5 (85.1)	25.8 (78.4)	21.1 (70.0)	17.0 (62.6)	23.8 (74.8)
Mean daily minimum °C (°F)	7.7 (45.9)	8.4 (47.1)	9.5 (49.1)	11.6 (52.9)	14.5 (58.1)	20.6 (69.1)	24.0 (75.2)	23.6 (74.5)	22.2 (72.0)	16.8 (62.2)	11.6 (52.9)	7.9 (46.2)	14.8 (58.6)
Record low °C (°F)	−1.0 (30.2)	−1.0 (30.2)	0.0 (32.0)	3.0 (37.4)	5.0 (41.0)	7.0 (44.6)	16.0 (60.8)	7.0 (44.6)	13.0 (55.4)	8.0 (46.4)	2.0 (35.6)	0.0 (32.0)	−1.0 (30.2)
Average precipitation mm (inches)	9.0 (0.35)	4.6 (0.18)	5.9 (0.23)	1.3 (0.05)	0.2 (0.01)	3.6 (0.14)	53.6 (2.11)	62.1 (2.44)	63.9 (2.52)	7.0 (0.28)	7.2 (0.28)	7.1 (0.28)	201.6 (7.94)
Average precipitation days (≥ 0.1 mm)	2.0	1.2	0.9	0.2	0.3	0.5	6.0	7.3	3.2	2.1	1.3	2.0	27.0
Average relative humidity (%)	51	47	46	43	46	55	64	66	62	53	53	51	53
Mean monthly sunshine hours	207.2	216.1	230.2	251.8	291.6	302.4	246.5	241.2	237.7	253.7	219.5	200.4	2,898.3
Source 1: Servicio Meteorológico Nacional
Source 2: Colegio de Postgraduados (sun and humidity 1951–1980)

== The city ==
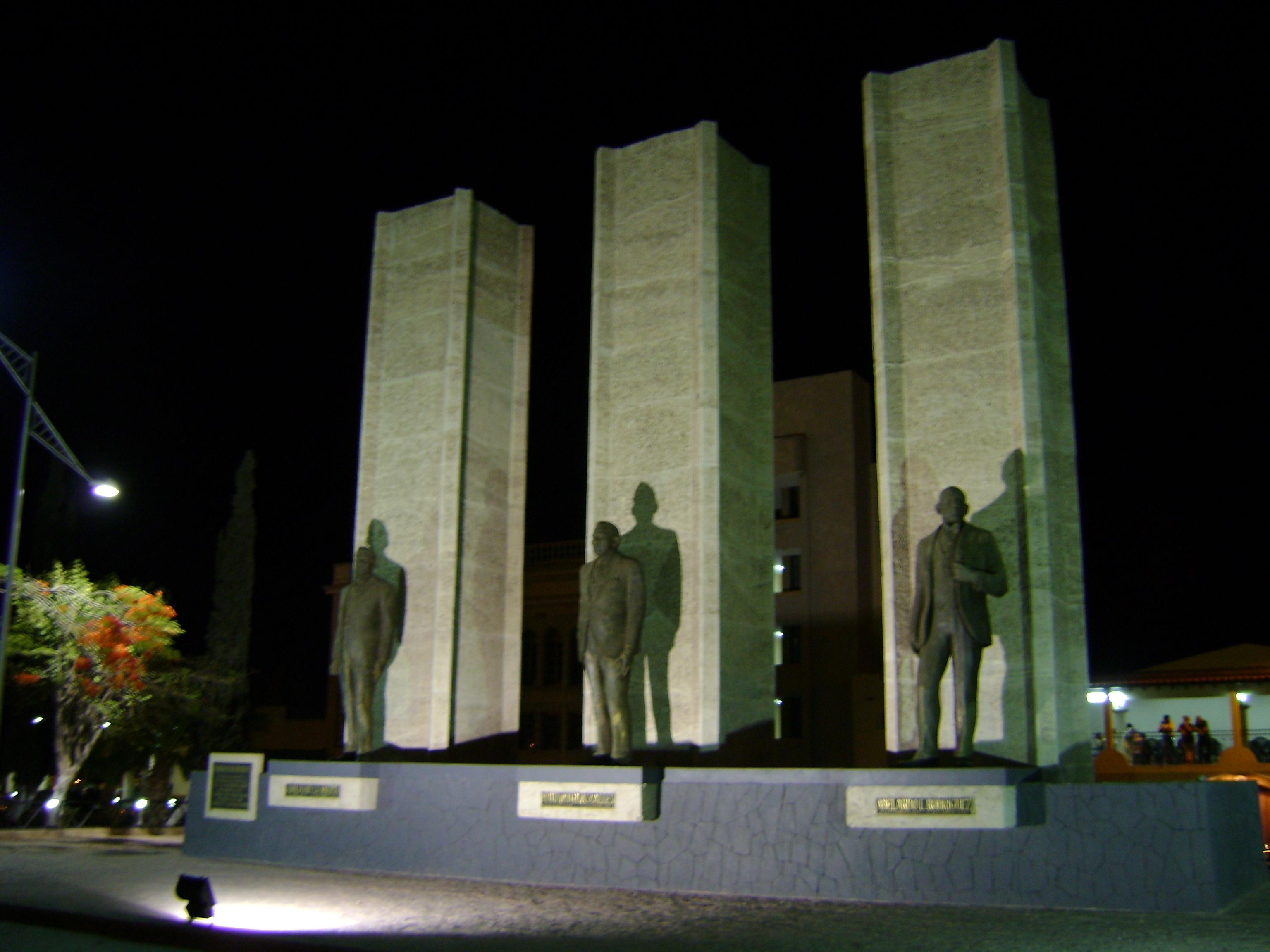
Statues of the three presidents at the Tres Presidentes Plaza

Guaymas is an industrial and shrimp-fishing port which has conserved a number of historical attractions. Buildings in the historic center have a mix of Neoclassical and Moorish facades, however many are in disrepair. The city has two main plazas, one called 13 de Julio, which is nicknamed the "plaza de los flojos" (lazy men's plaza) for the large number of people who relax there. In the 13 de Julio Plaza there is a monument commemorating the defense of Guaymas by General José María Yáñez against a French incursion in 1854. The Moorish style kiosk in the center has deteriorated due to the humidity. The town's main church, San Fernando, built in the 19th century, faces this plaza.

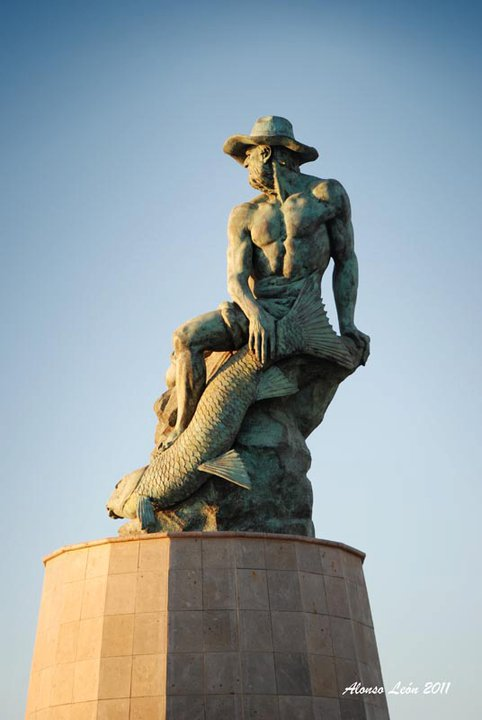
Statue of the Fisherman by Julián Martínez Soto.

The other major plaza is the Plaza de los Tres Presidentes with statues of Plutarco Elías Calles, Adolfo de la Huerta and Abelardo L. Rodríguez, all of whom are from near Guaymas. Facing this plaza is the Municipal Palace and a small concrete pier with the Statue of the Fisherman, on which is the lyrics of the song "La Barca de Guaymas". This statue is considered to be emblematic to the city.

Other landmarks include the old Bank of Sonora building with its Neoclassical facade, the old jailhouse built in 1900, the Casa de las Conchas (House of Shells), which has a large collection on display and for sale, and the Casa de Cultura (Cultural Center), which offers classes and workshops in various arts.

Institutes of higher education in the city include the Instituto Tecnológico de Guaymas, the Instituto Tecnológico de Sonora, Guaymas and the Universidad TecMilenio Guaymas

Baseball is a popular sport in this city. The local professional team is called the Ostioneros. The city once had ferry service to/from Santa Rosalía, Baja California Sur, although it was suspended during the COVID-19 pandemic and as of 2022 there are no plans to resume service. There is an international airport. As it is between the sea and ranching country, the city's cuisine includes both seafood and beef specialties such as fish tacos and carne asada.

== Carnival of Guaymas ==
Guaymas holds one of Mexico's major Carnival celebrations, and is one of the oldest in the country. The annual event begins on the Thursday before Ash Wednesday and ends at the stroke of midnight of the beginning of Lent. Events are held in several locations with a number of events, such as the yearly parade, extending over multiple days. It begins with the Quema del malhumor or Hoguera, when an effigy of something or someone who has displeased the public is burned. Each year, the effigy represents something different. In past years, the effigy has represented the figures of Carlos Salinas de Gortari, Vicente Fox, George H. W. Bush, Mexico's value added tax and lack of water. In 2009, the effigy was of singer Julio Preciado for his poor interpretation of Mexico's national anthem at the recent Serie del Caribe baseball tournament. Other major events include concerts by regionally and nationally known artists, a multi-day parade with floats and the election of the King and Queen of the Carnival.

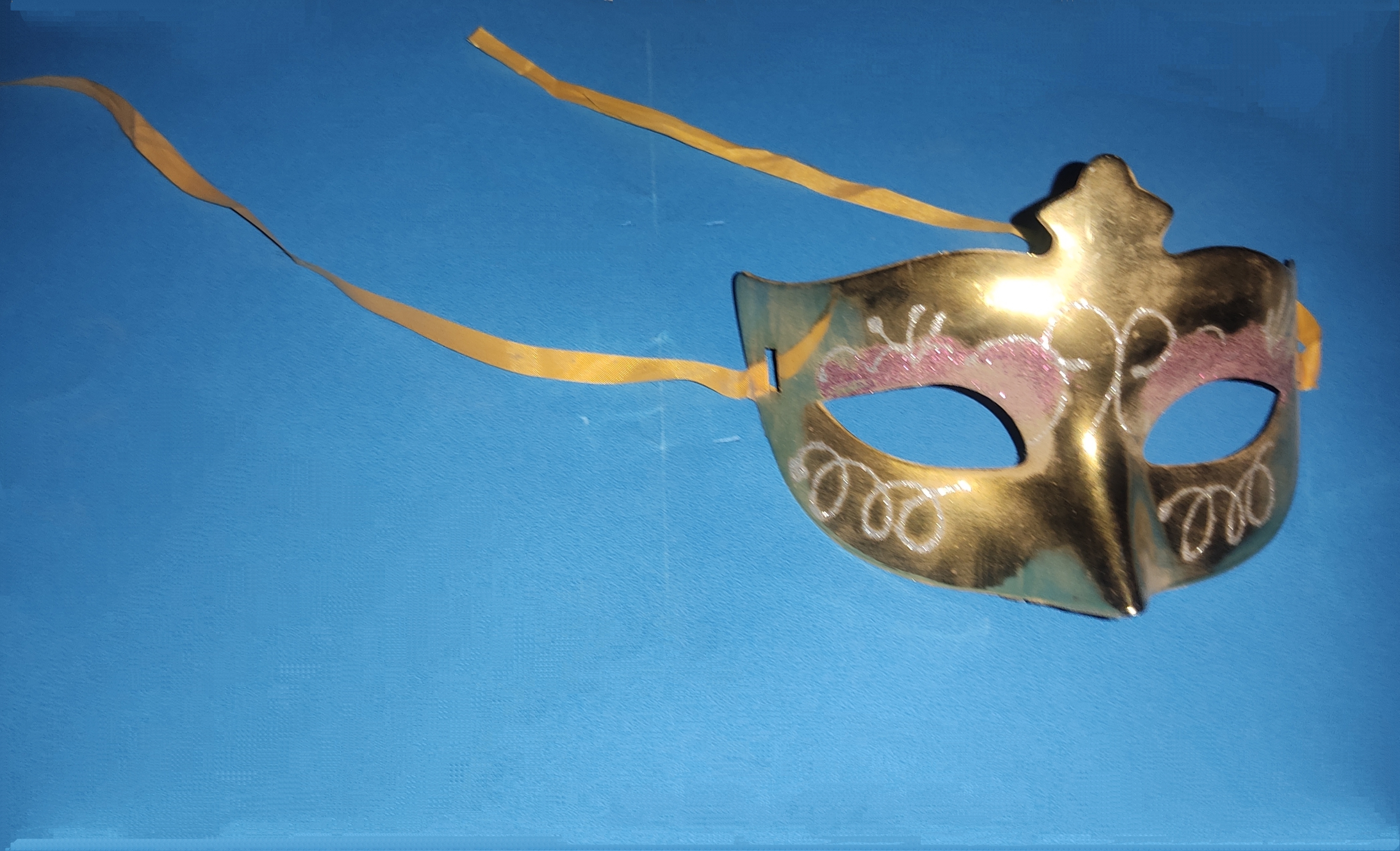
Carnival mask

The history of Carnival in Guaymas begins after the Reform War and French Intervention in Mexico, when Guaymas and the rest of the country experienced a period of peace and economic development. The success of Guaymas's port attracted a number of European immigrants and visitors. They brought the idea of organizing a Carnival similar to those celebrated in Europe. Guaymas's first carnival is recorded in book called El Viejo Guaymas (Old Guaymas) written by Alfonso Iberri. It was one of the first to take place in Mexico. In 1888, the first Carnival Queen was María Zuber and the first King was Alfredo Díaz Velasco. The King and Queen were paraded on the streets of Guaymas in a coach, followed by coaches carrying their entourage. The event ended with a grand ball that night.

Initially, the Carnival event was restricted to the upper classes. The lower classes watched the annual parade, but the most important events were the balls given at various mansions. This tradition continued until the Mexican Revolution. In 1913, Álvaro Obregón took control of the port, and the war devastated the area economically. Many of the businesspeople had sided with Porfirio Díaz and had to leave. The city wanted to keep the annual Carnival tradition. Various social clubs vied for control over the event, especially the naming of the Carnival Queen. The queen was determined by which group provided the most money for Carnival events, which led to widespread cheating and scandals, especially in the year 1927, when the military had to get involved to keep order.

The goal of the fundraising was to decorate the 13 de Julio Plaza, as the event had become public. People came to the plaza dressed in costumes, and the event drew people from neighboring cities. The event still had the yearly parades, now with floats, and both private and public balls. Masks hiding identity were permitted, allow for the playing of practical jokes, and homosexuals were among those who took advantage of the anonymity.

By the 1960s and 1970s, the Carnival had evolved into an entirely popular event with mass participation, bringing in many visitors to the city. Sister cities such as El Segundo, California and Mesa, Arizona were invited to participate. After the inauguration of the Plaza de los Tres Presidentes, the event was moved to this larger plaza, which allowed for carnival rides and concerts by regionally and nationally known artists. The use of masks was banned due to violence. The traditional queen is now popularly elected, and the King is named the Rey Feo (Ugly King). Over time, the new plaza was no longer large enough to hold the event, and an admission charge was instituted. Security was instituted as well as checkpoints for weapons. The coronation of a Gay King was begun, and the number of floats participating in the parade grew.

== The municipality ==
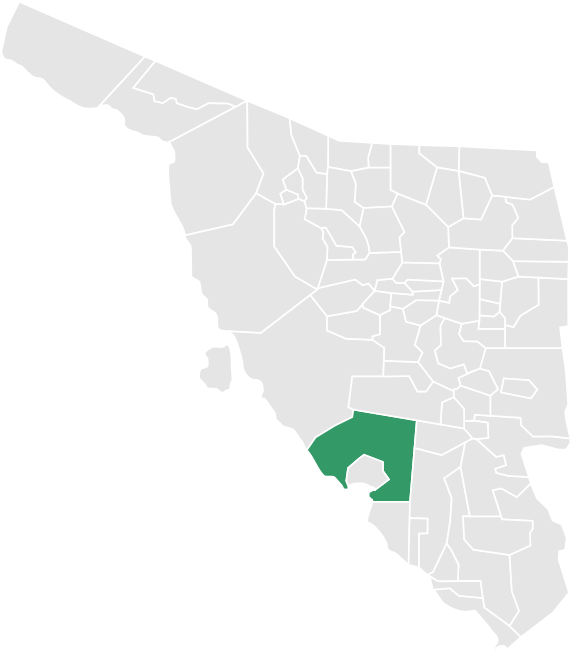
Map of the municipality in Sonora

As municipal seat, the city of Guaymas is the governing authority for more than 1,500 other communities, the most populous of which are Bahía San Carlos, Pueblo Vícam, San Ignacio Río Muerto, Pótam, Bahía de los Lobos and Ortíz. The municipality has a territory of 12,206.18 km^{2} (4,712.83 sq mi). and a total population of 134,153, of which 101,502 or about 75% of whom live in the city proper. The municipality borders the municipalities of La Colorada, Suaqui Grande, Cajeme, Bácum and Hermosillo, with the Gulf of California to the west. Most of the municipality is flat and borders the Gulf of California with 175 km of coastline. Along its coast, there are important bays such as Guaymas, Lobos, San Carlos and La Herradura with 83% of Sonora's piers in this municipality. Major elevations include the Serranías del Bacarete, Santa Úrsula, San José, San Pedro, Luis Bland and the Cerros del Vigía. There are two main rivers called the Mátape and the Bácum which empty into estuaries on the Gulf. The municipality has a hot, dry climate with maximum temperatures averaging 31C and minimum temperatures averaging 18C. Maximum temperatures can reach 50C during the summers and from June to October ocean temperatures are in the 80sF. Most of the territory is covered with mesquite trees and cactus. It is also the home of the endangered California Fan Palm, and Washingtonia filifera is found in coastal groves. Other species such as Perityle have been long noted at Guaymas. Desert animals such as the desert tortoise, chameleon, puma, rattlesnakes and others are the main wildlife.

Almost all agriculture here is irrigated, and depends on wells and the Ignacio Alatorre Dam located in the Guaymas Valley. Fields here yield wheat, soybeans, safflower, corn, cotton with some fruit trees. The most important livestock here is cattle, with goats coming second. However, cattle production has decreased somewhat, with pig and domestic fowl increasing. The most important industry is related to processing fish products, such as canning and freezing, all located in the city proper. A relatively large number of manufacturing operations controlled by foreign companies maquiladoras have opened here employing over 11,000 people, producing precision machined components for aerospace engines, electrical and mechanical components for automobiles, medical devices, and plastic injection molding for a variety of industries. Construction related to the port is also a major employer. Some mining occurs here, mostly graphite, with some small quantities of gold, silver and lead. The most important economic activity in the municipality is fishing. Most fish the waters of the Gulf but some are involved in aquaculture. Species sold include sardines, shrimp, and squid. In rural parts of Guaymas's coast, fishing employs over 80% of the population.

The municipality, especially San Carlos, is popular with visitors from Arizona and Sonora, but much of the coastal area, where the stark desert landscape meets the calm waters of the Gulf of California, is still undeveloped. San Carlos is an important destination for sportfishing with modern piers and 800 species that can be caught including sailfish, marlin, yellowtail and others. This bay holds a fishing tournament each year in July called the Torneo de Pesca de San Carlos. San Carlos also has an aquarium dedicated to dolphins and sea lions, which perform shows. The most notable peak in San Carlos is called the Tetacawi or Teta de Cabra, which appears to have two horns. Teta de Cabra means "goat's udder" which it is supposed to resemble. Other sports that can be practiced here include kayaking, sailing, jetskiing, snorkeling, scuba diving, mountain biking and hiking. San Pedro Island off the coast is popular for snorkeling, scubadiving and visiting the sea lions that live there. The Bacochibambo or Miramar Bay also attracts some tourism. In this bay there is a pearl growing facility, the only one of its kind in the Americas. Pearls from here come in a range of colors such as grey, gold, bronze, olive green, black and pink.

On land, there is the Sahuaral Desert, about twenty minutes from the city of Guaymas. It contains a very tall cactus that is approximately 500 years old. Here, the Barajitas Canyon is also a natural reserve, with three ecosystems and considered a sacred place by the Seri Indians. The canyon is accessible only by boat.

== Tracking station ==
The Guaymas-Empalme station for space observations was about 10 km (6 mi) east of Empalme, Sonora, adjacent to Federal Highway No. 15. As a major link in the NASA's worldwide Manned Space Flight Network, the Guaymas Tracking Station, built in 1961, played a key role in tracking American manned space flights in the Mercury, Gemini, and Apollo programs through Apollo 13. The U.S. discontinued its use on November 30, 1970, due to changes in the Apollo mission profile which no longer required the Guaymas station. Equipment designed especially for support of the Apollo program was removed, but other equipment was left for support of Mexican space activities and future programs of mutual interest to Mexican scientists and NASA but According to local sources the station was abandoned shortly after the conclusion of the Apollo program and has been used recently as a greenhouse complex for agricultural use.

=== Communications and transport ===
The municipality of Guaymas has a transport infrastructure consisting of a road network of 986.8 kilometers, being the Federal Highway 15 main line of communication, of which 118.2 correspond to the main network, 184.6 to the network 684 kilometres are rural or neighborhood roads.

It also has a branch of railway lines of 4.5 kilometers, an international airport, 8 runways and a port with a total docking length of 17,234 meters distributed between the port of height and the docking extension for fishing activity.

For public freight transport, the Port of Guaymas has a central freight services and has solved the problem of lack of bus lines to expand the ticket offer.

As far as communications are concerned, Guaymas has all the public services offered by the sector, including those for maritime navigation. Particularly the mail and telegraph services that have 5 offices, especially to cater to those towns with greater than 500 inhabitants.

Guaymas International Airport serves the city with flights on two commercial passenger airlines.

== Sociodemographic profile ==
=== Ethnic groups ===
The indigenous presence in the municipality is of great importance, since it has 11,394 inhabitants who speak an indigenous language, which represent 8% of the total population of the municipality. The most common indigenous language is Yaqui Language, which accounts for 10,779 (94.6%) of the total.

=== Demographic evolution ===
According to the Population and Housing Count of 2010, the city of Guaymas had a population of 113,082 inhabitants.

The total municipal population has 149,299 inhabitants in its approximately 42 localities and approximately 310 ejidos and rancherías.

As a municipality stand out: 113,082 of its municipal headoffice (Guaymas), Vícam with 9,364, Pótam with 6,417, and San Carlos with 2,264.

== Economy ==
Main producer and exporter of honey in Mexico.

=== Fishing ===
It has 175 kilometers of coastline including bays such as Guaymas, Lobos, San Carlos (Mexico) and the Herradura. The municipality has more than 83% of the docks operating in the State. 80 percent of fishermen in coastal communities originate from the same region where they fish; 15 percent come from other localities of the state, and about 5 percent from other states, particularly Sinaloa and Nayarit.

Fishing has historically been the most important activity and main source of income in this city; with large installed capacity for capture, processing, and commercialization. Today, although it generates big employment and provides good income to the majority of the Guaymense population it has stopped being considered as the most important activity. The arrival of maquiladora (manufacturing) plants which compete with the fishing industry have been a challenging factor, as well as the unfortunately growing lack of interest in both its government and population.

There was a time when the Guaymense fishing employed 11,800 people in the catch, and another 325 in aquaculture. It contributed to 70% of the total Sonora state fisheries production, with the main species caught being sardine, shrimp and squid. The fleet consisted of 359 shrimp vessels, 32 sardineras, 3 for scales fishing and 910 smaller vessels, for a total of 1,304. 55% of catches were sold in the State, and the remaining 45% to other parts of Mexico and the foreign market. Foreign exports have always been mostly shrimp, which has a high price in the international market, and makes Guaymense fishing very dependent on the conditions of this market.

In 1962, when the Instituto de Investigaciones Biológico Pesqueras, today known as Instituto Mexicano de Investigación en Pesca y Acuacultura Sustentables (National Fisheries Institute), was created, the federal government started the construction of four fisheries biology stations, being Guaymas the location of one of the first four.

For the facilities, it requested the import of prefabricated houses that were located on 20th Street in Colonia La Cantera, where it still remains and which would later be renamed Centro Regional de Investigación Pesquera (CRIP), whose first director was biologist Fernando J. Rosales.

In Guaymas was where in 1969, shrimp farming was first carried out in Latin America, by M. en C. Maria Concepcion Rodriguez de la Cruz. Although not for commercial purposes, but as part of the work being carried out at the National Fisheries Institute. Although the technical work continued at the Scientific and Technical Research Center of the University of Sonora (CICTUS), and in Puerto Peñasco, Sonora, many years passed before this technique could be implemented commercially, which happened in 1985.

The states of Sinaloa and Sonora were the pioneers in this activity, where cultivation was mostly carried out with wild white shrimp postlarvae, although there are currently some laboratories dedicated to the controlled production of these stages, the cost of production makes cultivation with wild organisms more profitable.

=== Agriculture ===
The irrigation infrastructure for agriculture in addition to 186 wells, also includes the Ignacio Alatorre Dam that is located in the Guaymas Valley with a total capacity of 27.7 million cubic meters; and the heat water repressive in Vícam with extraction capacity of 15.3 million cubic meters of water and 345 kilometers of coated conduction channels.

Agriculture in the municipality takes place on a total area of 42,291 hectares, of which 22,000 hectares are located in the Yaquis communities and the Guaymas valley. 17,296 hectares are irrigated, and 2,995 hectares of moisture or temporary.

The main crops are: wheat, soybeans, safflower, corn, cotton and some vegetables and fruit such as pumpkin and papaya

The cultivated area had a decrease of 2.3 per cent on an annual average over the past 5 years, from 51,850 hectares to 42,291 in the 1993-1994 cycle, a behaviour that was mainly influenced by the decline in sesame crops and sesame in that order of importance.

Even though the cultivated agricultural area declined in the last 5 years, the volume of production grew at an average annual rate of 2.5 per cent from 233,980 tonnes in the 1989-1990 cycle to 258,525 tonnes in the 1993-1994 cycle, growth that was founded on better crop yields, such as soybeans and maize among others.

=== Livestock ===
In livestock activity, cattle ranching with 72,875 head is the most important, followed by goats with 20,088 bellies, and lastly birds and other minor species.

The production of beef, milk and eggs decreased between 1990 and 1995, with the former decreasing from 81,830 to 72,875 head of cattle, while the production of pork and poultry grew. There are underutilized resources that with adequate support could generate significant income through agricultural integration by growing fodder crops in agricultural areas for harvest by grazing beef and milk cattle. Investments in the mechanization of meat and milk production, with support for the rehabilitation and modernization of pasteurizers, would also improve production.

Development of goat culture is also a promising possibility in locations that by their topography and vegetation are unfavorable to cattle.

=== Industry ===
The manufacturing industry producing food of fishery origin, both for human and animal consumption, stands out as the main branch of activity.

The industrial fishing plant consists of 5 canneries, 8 flours and 12 frozen food plants, all located in the Port of Guaymas.

Over the past 3 years, the local fishing industry workforce has declined from 4,153 jobs to 2,153, a declining rate of 28 per cent on an annual average.

Likewise, the Port of Guaymas has had an important growth in the maquilading sector of the aerospace sector, placing Sonora as the nation's third largest supplier for this industry. Just as the aerospace industry has grown, so also has there been important growth in automotive and medical investment, because of its proximity to the Guaymas border has become a very attractive place for foreign investment in recent years. In the construction industry there are 32 companies that are engaged in the construction of homes and real estate in general, and another 10 to the construction and repair of boats; the former generate a total of 300 jobs and the second 559 jobs, between plant and eventual workforce.

=== Tourism ===
Guaymas offers many tourist attractions such as: Golf, snorkeling, sport fishing, horseback riding, ecotourism tours, cycling, diving and kayaking.

Thanks to the Only Sonora' program, unique in the country, vehicles can be brought from the United States without paying or carrying out formalities and permits, from Nogales to as far as Empalme.

The tourist area of the beach is located northwest of the port, being the region of the Bay of San Carlos (Mexico) and its surroundings and to a lesser extent the Bay of Bacochibampo or Miramar.

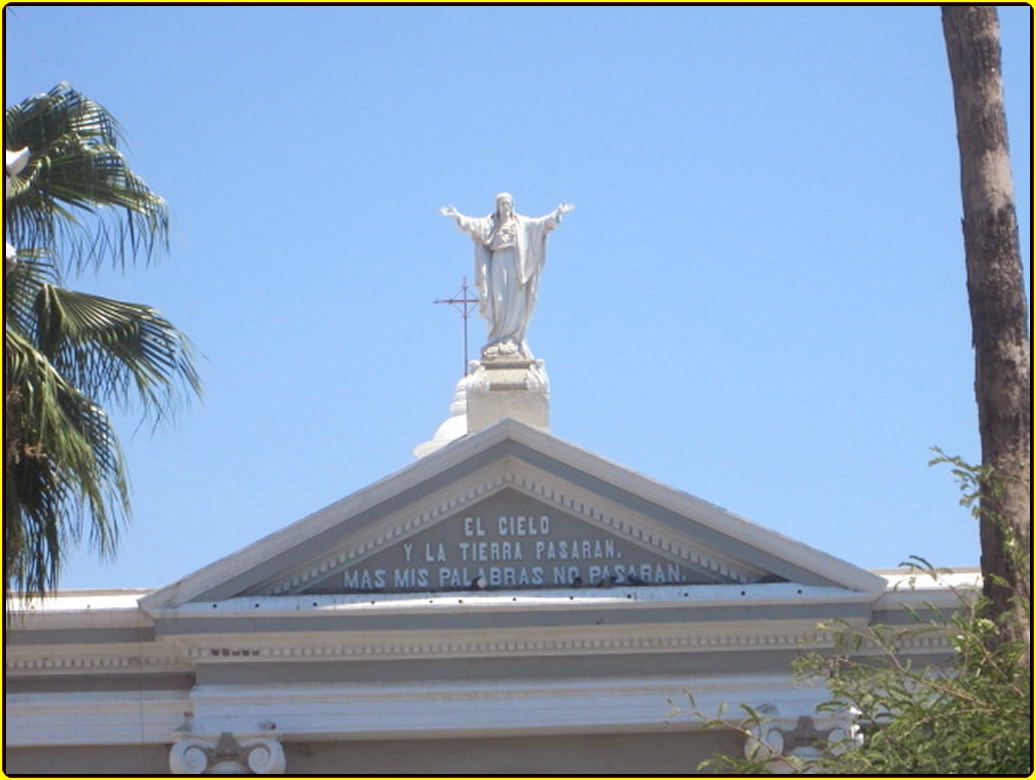
Pediment of the San Fernando Parochial Temple, with a caption that reads: "El cielo y la Tierra pasarán. Mas mis palabras no pasarán", i.e. "Heaven and Earth will pass away; my words will never pass away." (Matthew 24, 35.)

Guaymas also has some architectural attractions such as the Temple of the Sacred Heart, Church of San Fernando (nineteenth century), Plaza de los Tres Presidentes, Plaza de Armas, the old Bank of Sonora, the monument to the fisherman, monument to Benito Juárez, the Palace Municipal, among others.

Among the ecotourism attractions are the nature reserves Estero del Soldado ("Soldier's Estuary"), San Pedro Nolasco Island, Devil's Cajon and Nacapule's Canyon with endemic species.

The most famous festival of the port is the Carnival, which is celebrated in the month of February of each year from 1888 and the festivities of the Bermejo Sea that are held in July to commemorate the Battle of Guaymas.

Another of Guaymas's tourist attractions is the Sonora Dolphinarium, where dolphin-therapy services are offered. Tourism activity generates more than 8,000 jobs, of which 2,700 are direct. Guaymas's lodging facilities consist of 24 establishments, including hotels, motels and guesthouses; with a total of 1,801 rooms.

It also has 4 tourist condominiums, 2 marinas with spaces to accommodate 798 boats, and 5 fields for trailers with a total of 729 spaces.

Technical classes are offered in school to train citizens in community tourism jobs.

The local hotels in Guaymas-San Carlos have an average annual occupancy rate of 41.8%, reaching 100% during busy seasons, which keeps Guaymas as a focal point in Sonorense tourism.

== Sister cities ==
- (United States) El Segundo, California
- (United States) Mesa, Arizona
- (United States) Silver Spring, Maryland
- 27°58′N 110°58′W
