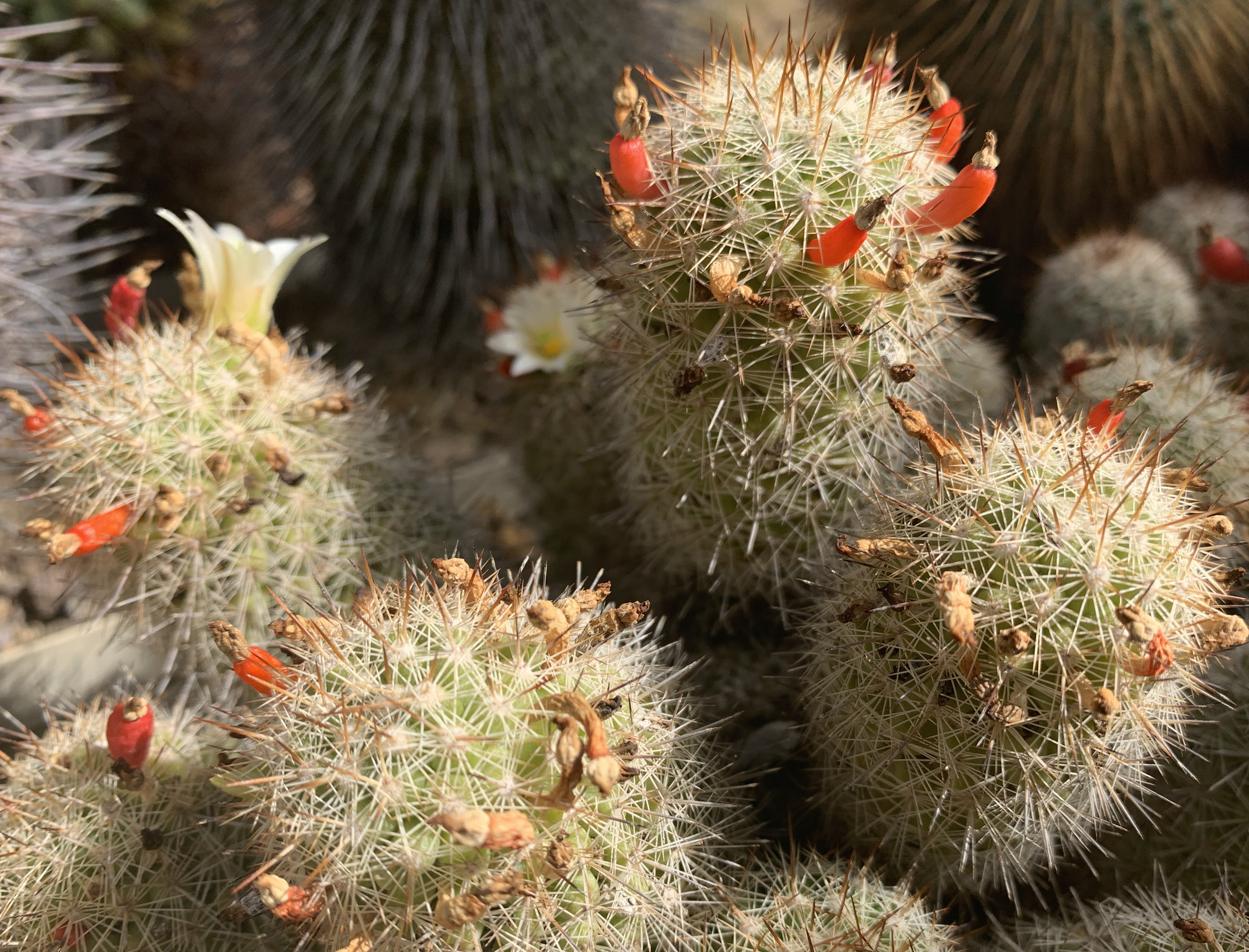

Conservation status
- Vulnerable (IUCN 3.1)

Scientific classification
- Kingdom: Plantae
- Clade: Tracheophytes
- Clade: Angiosperms
- Clade: Eudicots
- Order: Caryophyllales
- Family: Cactaceae
- Subfamily: Cactoideae
- Genus: Cochemiea
- Species: C. multidigitata

Binomial name
- Cochemiea multidigitata (Radley & G.E.Linds.) P.B.Breslin

Synonyms
- Bartschella multidigitata (Radley ex G.E.Linds.) Doweld; Mammillaria dioica var. multidigitata (Radley ex G.E.Linds.) Neutel.; Mammillaria multidigitata Radley ex G.E.Linds.; Neomammillaria multidigitata (Radley ex G.E.Linds.) Y.Itô

= Cochemiea multidigitata =

Species of cactus

Cochemiea multidigitata is a species of flowering plant in the family Cactaceae that is endemic to San Pedro Nolasco Island in Mexico, growing on steep slopes. Cochemiea multidigitata sprouts a white to cream-colored flower from spring to early summer.

== Description ==
Cochemiea multidigitata grows abundantly and forms large groups of over a hundred individual bodies. The cylindrical, green shoots grow to a height of 5 to 20 cm (2.0 to 7.9 in) and a diameter of 2 to 5 cm (0.79 to 1.97 in). The blunt warts do not produce milky juice. The axillae are covered with some wool. The 4 central spines are straight, or sometimes one hooked, needle-like, white with a brown tip and up to 8 millimeters long. The 15 to 25 spreading marginal spines are white and 6 to 8 mm (0.24 to 0.31 in) long.

The flowers are white to cream colored and up to 1.5 cm (0.59 in) long. The club-shaped fruits are red. They are up to 1.5 cm (0.59 in) long and contain brown seeds.

== Distribution ==
Cochemiea multidigitata is native to the Mexican state of Sonora, on the island of San Pedro Nolasco in the Gulf of California.

== Taxonomy ==
It was first described as Mammillaria multidigitata in 1947 by George Edmund Lindsay. The specific epithet multidigitata is derived from the Latin words multi- for 'many' and digitatus for 'finger' and refers to the growth habit of the species. Peter B. Breslin and Lucas C. Majure placed the species in the genus Cochemiea in 2021

== Gallery ==
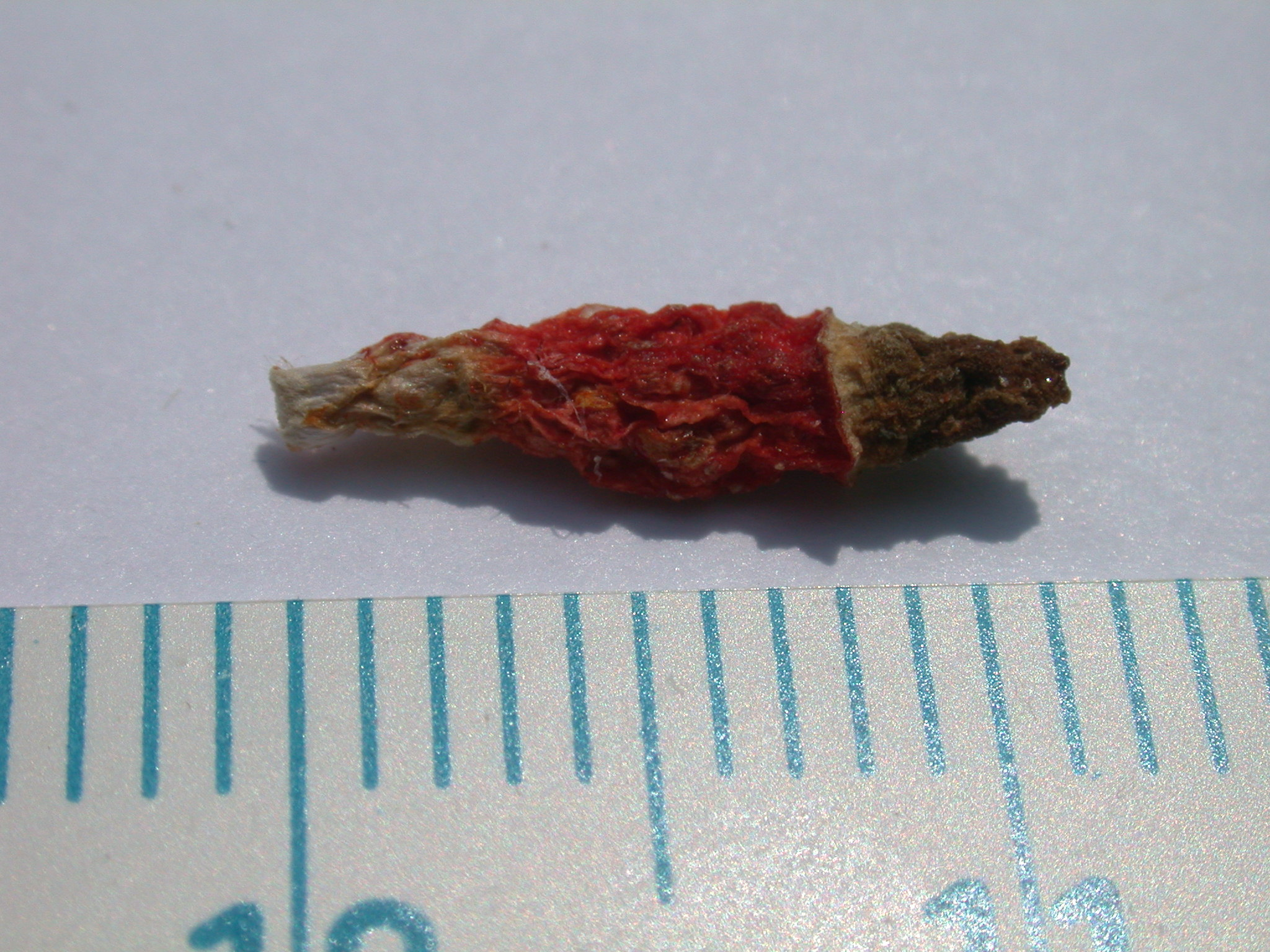
Cochemiea multidigitata fruit
