= Ctenosaura nolascensis =

Conservation status
- Vulnerable (IUCN 3.1)
- CITES Appendix II (CITES)

Scientific classification
- Kingdom: Animalia
- Phylum: Chordata
- Class: Reptilia
- Order: Squamata
- Suborder: Iguania
- Family: Iguanidae
- Genus: Ctenosaura
- Species: C. nolascensis

Binomial name
- Ctenosaura nolascensis Smith, 1972

Species of iguana

Ctenosaura nolascensis, the Nolasco spiny-tailed iguana or San Pedro Nolasco spinytail iguana, is a species of iguana native to Mexico. It is endemic to one island, the Isla San Pedro Nolasco.
