= San Carlos, Sonora =

Beachfront area and town in Sonora, Mexico

- Locality
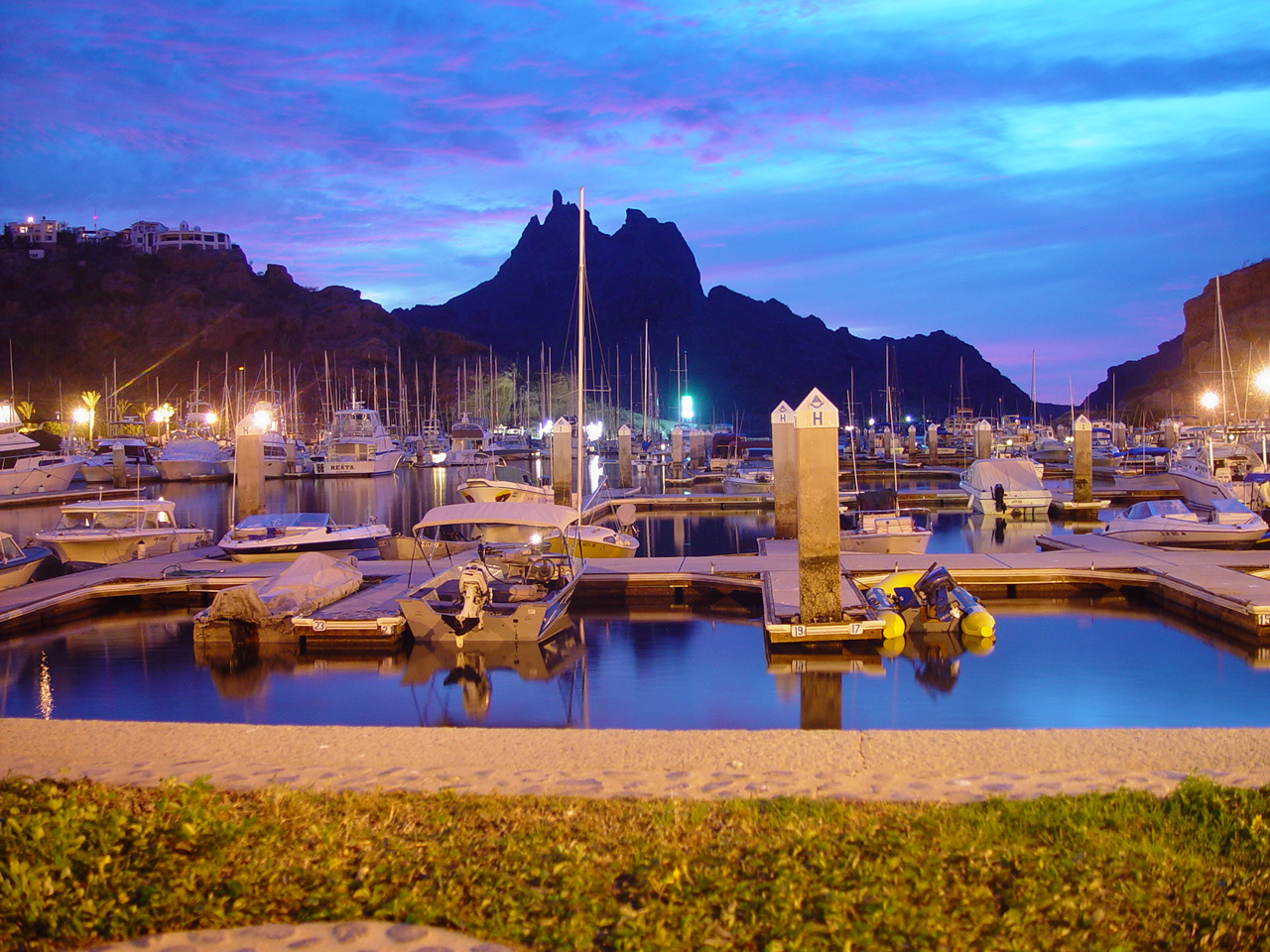
- Boats in San Carlos

- Location within Sonora Location within Mexico
- Coordinates: 27.9686474°N 111.0322902°W
- Country: Mexico
- State: Sonora
- Municipality: Guaymas

Population (2020)
  - Total: 2,508

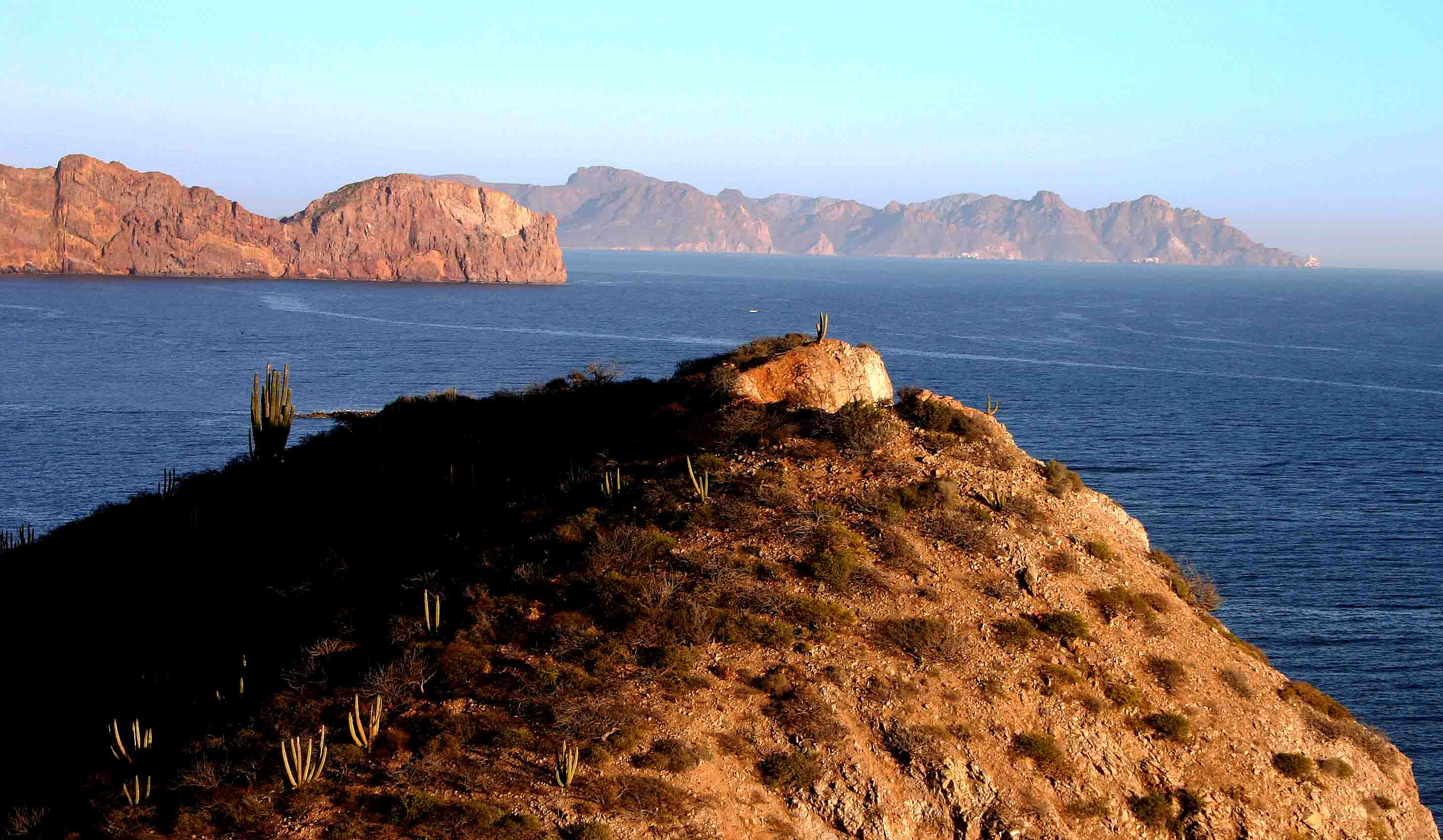
View of San Carlos Bay, Sonora

San Carlos is a beachfront subdivision within the port city of Guaymas, but is considered its own town in the northern state of Sonora in Mexico. It is known for the clarity and warmth of the ocean water in its shallow bays. It lies on the Sea of Cortez. Given the size of the city, with nearly 7,000 inhabitants, there is a large number of RV Parks, resorts and stores available. There is also an active diving community. Many Americans and Canadians live in San Carlos during the winter months. The summer months are very hot and humid. Fishing, Scuba diving, and beach activities can be pursued here. Another widespread sport in San Carlos is sailing but you can also decide to skydive over the Sea of Cortez.

San Carlos is about a six-hour drive from the United States along the Mexican interstate Highway 15.

In 2023, San Carlos was designated a Pueblo Mágico by the Mexican government, recognizing its cultural and historical importance.

== History and legal background ==
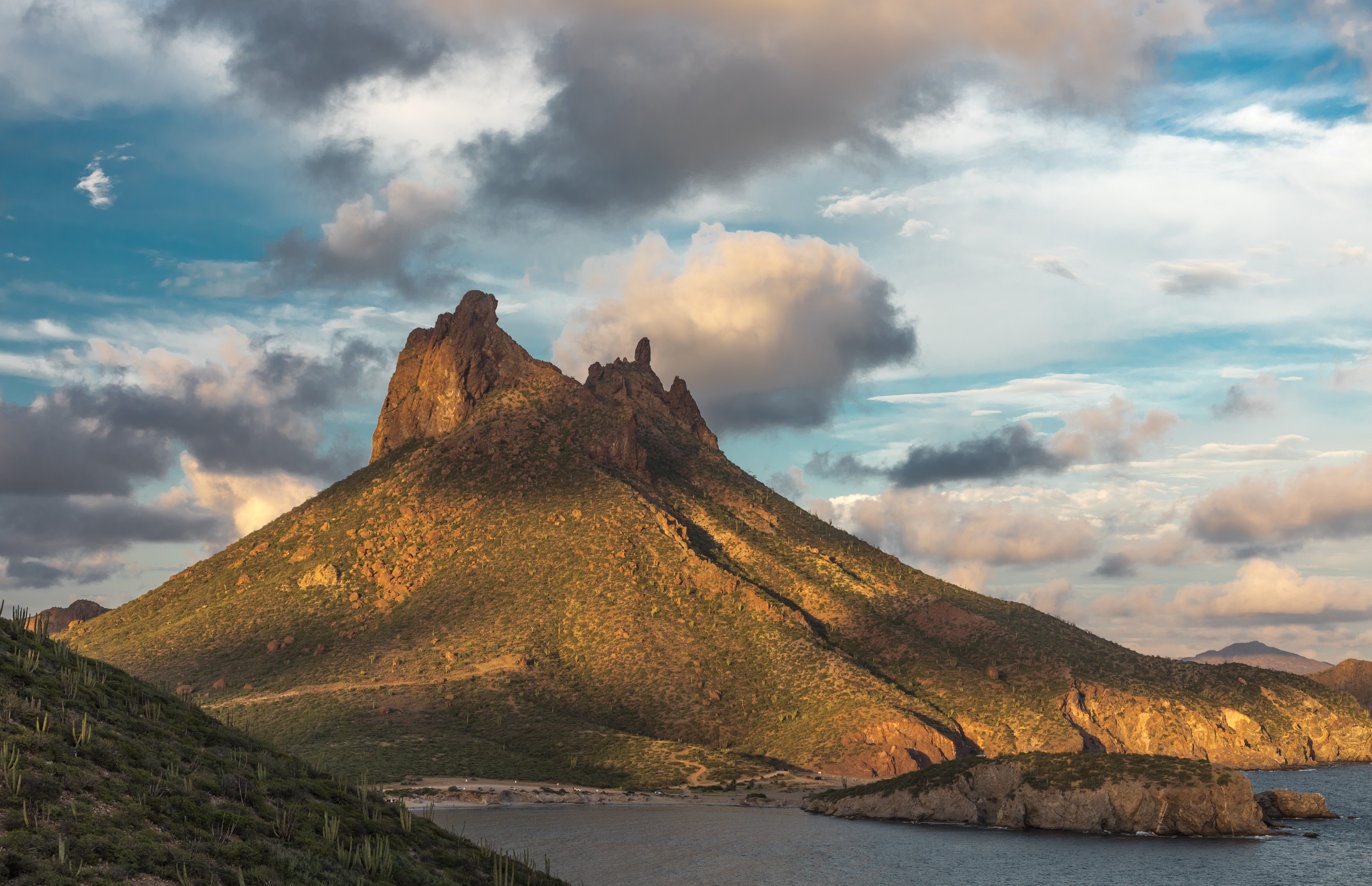
Tetakawi

The community of San Carlos was founded on land that previously was a large cattle ranch known as the Baviso de Navarro. This was later subdivided in four great estates known as Rancho Los Algodones, Rancho San Carlos, Rancho El Baviso and Rancho El Represo. In the mid-1950s, Mr. Rafael T. Caballero acquired the ranches Los Algodones, San Carlos and El Baviso, contracting the services of City planners who designed the first stages of a gradual and carefully planned tourist development that in time would become one of the first and most important tourist and recreational communities in the State.

When the private investors began the initial works for this development, in support of this vision, the State Congress of Sonora during the governorship of Luis Encinas Johnson issued a declaration establishing the official incorporation of the Township of San Carlos, Nuevo Guaymas, Municipality of Guaymas, Sonora, Mexico, through a Decree published on 28 September 1963, with an endowment of 27.746 square kilometres of privately owned lands located in the Southern portion of the estate Ranch El Baviso.

To complement the Township Land Endowment, the State Congress, during the office of Governor Faustino Felix Serna, increased the Legal Land Fund by adding the estates known as Ranch San Carlos and Ranch Los Algodones, both with a surface of 22.04 km^{2}, as published in the Official State Bulletin no. 23, on 21 March 1973. A total of 49.79 km^{2} of privately owned lands constitute the territorial reserves of this development.

On 1 July 1976, The Agrarian reform Secretariat, through the Director of Legal Affaires, declared by means of official notification no. 240–438155, Reference XV; that the mentioned privately owned lands located in the remaining lands of the estates El Baviso and San Carlos, have no agrarian legal claims upon them, and consequently the proprietors are free to lien, to encumber, to contribute to societies, to merge, to cede on trusteeship and to freely dispose of these lands. In that same official notice it is recognized that the proprietors of these four estates, voluntarily ceded to the Federal Government part of their lands for the creation of the new center of population and for the formation of the Ejido 13 July, affecting the Northern and the western portions of the estates San Carlos, El Baviso, Los Algodones and El Represo. The above in accordance to the Presidential Resolution of 15 July 1968, was published in the Official Gazette of the Federation on 27 August 1968.

In support of the objectives set forth by the private investors for the development of a new tourist destination, the Agrarian Reform Secretariat, the Secretary of Human Settlements and Public Works, and the Secretary of Tourism, altogether issued a Declaration of High-priority Tourist Zoning, for all the effects of law; in favor of the estates' El Baviso, San Carlos and Los Algodones, owned by Grupo Caballero. The cited declaration was published in the Official Gazette of the Federation No. 34 on 15 August 1980.

== Politics, motion pictures and tourism ==
Guaymas is the birthplace of three former Republic of Mexico presidents: Abelardo Rodriguez, Plutarco Elías Calles and Adolfo de la Huerta.

San Carlos has been used for many films, including:

- The classic film Catch-22, starring Alan Arkin, Orson Welles, Martin Sheen, Bob Newhart, Anthony Perkins.
- The Mask of Zorro - starring Antonio Banderas, Anthony Hopkins & Catherine Zeta-Jones
- Lucky Lady - starring Liza Minnelli
- Camaroneros - Mexican production starring Erick del Castillo
- Spanish language soap opera Por Tu Amor

The hotel/resorts of Club Med (now closed) and the San Carlos Plaza were built on beach frontage. A major alternative to the hotels in San Carlos are vacation rentals.

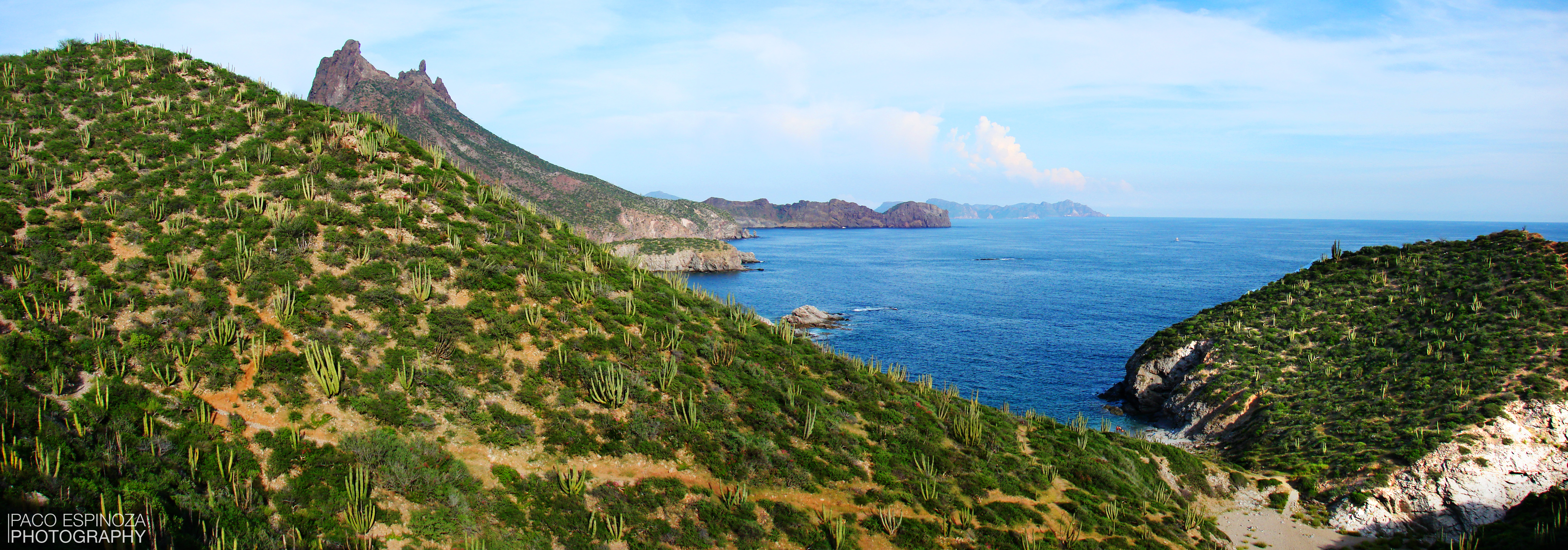
San Carlos Bay panorama, 2006

== Scuba diving in the area ==
The waters of the Gulf of California in the San Carlos area offer a multitude of diving opportunities at all skill levels year-round. Average surface temperatures are 85 °F (29.4 °C)-90 °F (32.2 °C) (often even warmer) June–August, 80 °F (26.6 °C)-89 °F (31.6 °C) September and October, 63 °F (17.2 °C)-71 °F (21.6 °C) in the winter months November–March, Then warms-up again 72 °F (22.2 °C)-77 °F (25 °C) in April and May.

Underwater visibility of over 100 ft. (30m) is very common. Sometimes visibility exceeds 200 ft. (61 m) as is often the case at San Pedro Nolasco Island. However, a consultation with a local shop dive shop or divemaster is recommended, and can provide accurate and detailed information on current conditions at specific dive sites.

=== Popular dive sites ===
- San Pedro Nolasco Island
- Martini Cove
- Catalina Island
- Double Point
- Eagle Rock
- The Three Marias
- Cautin
- Frenchie's Cove
- Lalo Cove
- Zorro Cove
- San Antonio Point
- Kevin's Rock
- Emerald Bay
- Painted Rocks
- San Luis Island
- Deer Island
- Window Rock
- Sea Mount
- San Nicolas Island
- Honeymoon Island
