= Port of Guaymas =

Guaymas
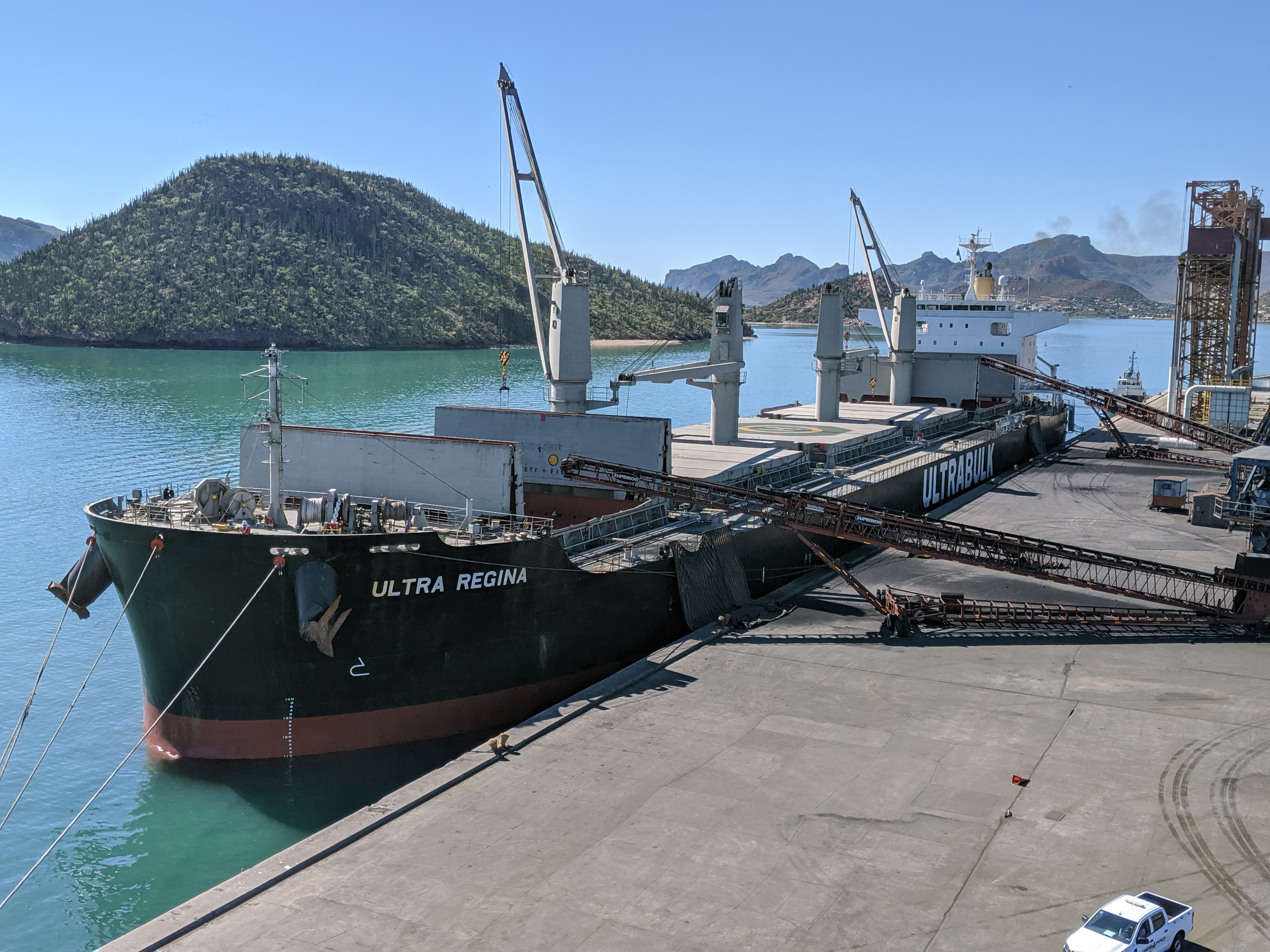
- Interactive map of Guaymas
- Location in Mexico

Location
- Country: Mexico
- Location: Guaymas, Sonora
- Coordinates: 27°54′N 110°52′W
- UN/LOCODE: MXGYM

Details
- No. of berths: 12
- Draft depth: 13.1 metres (43 ft)

Statistics
- Website puertodeguaymas.com.mx

The Port of Guaymas is a port located on the Gulf of California in the state of Sonora on Mexico's Pacific coast, 340 nautical miles NNW of Mazatlán.

Guaymas is an industrial port handling a wide range of dry bulk cargoes, as well as petroleum products, ammonia and LPG. Up to two cruise ships can be accommodated at a dedicated cruise terminal.
