= San Pedro Nolasco Island =

Mexican island in the Gulf of California

San Pedro Nolasco
Native name: Spanish: Isla San Pedro Nolasco
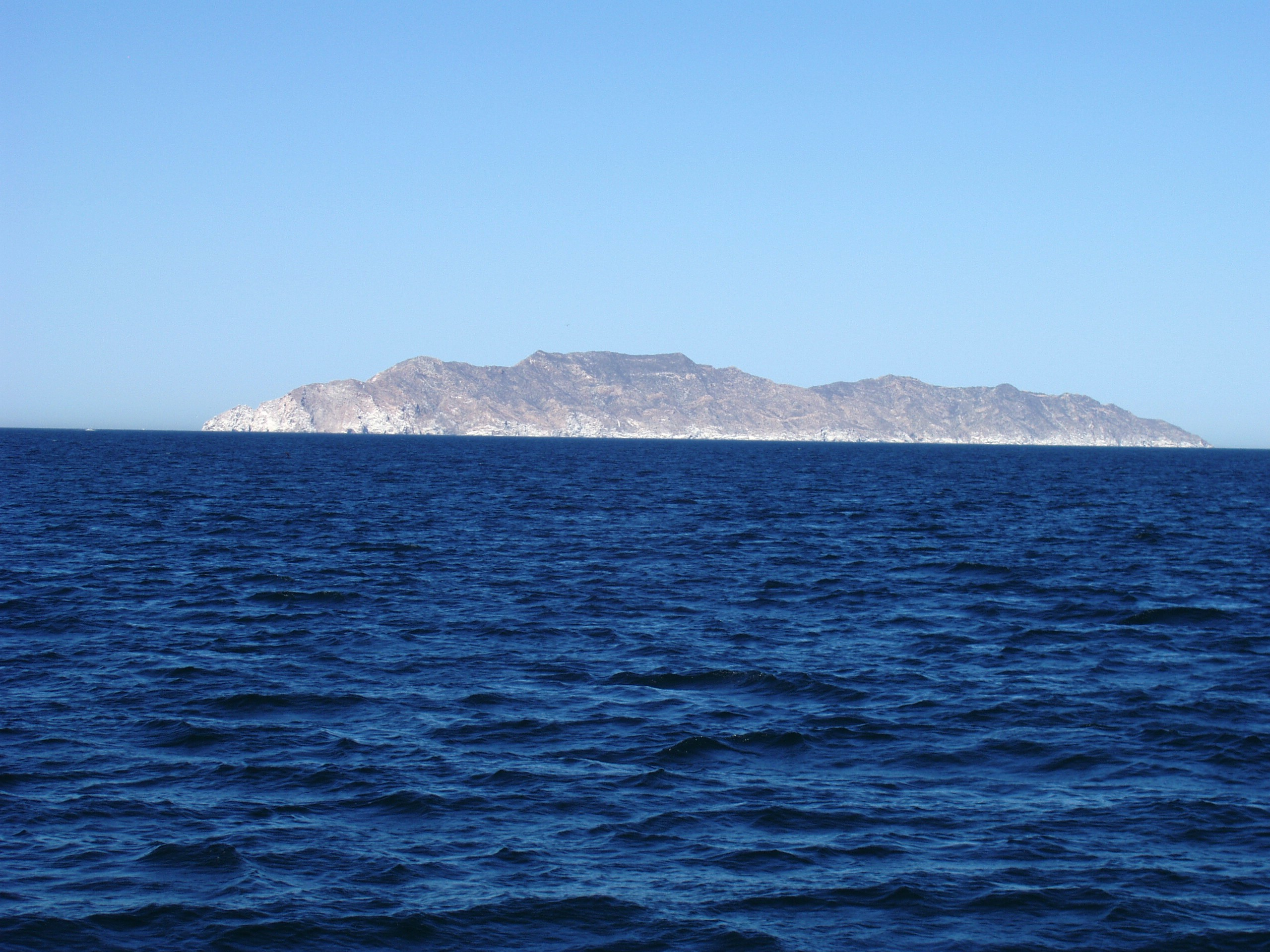

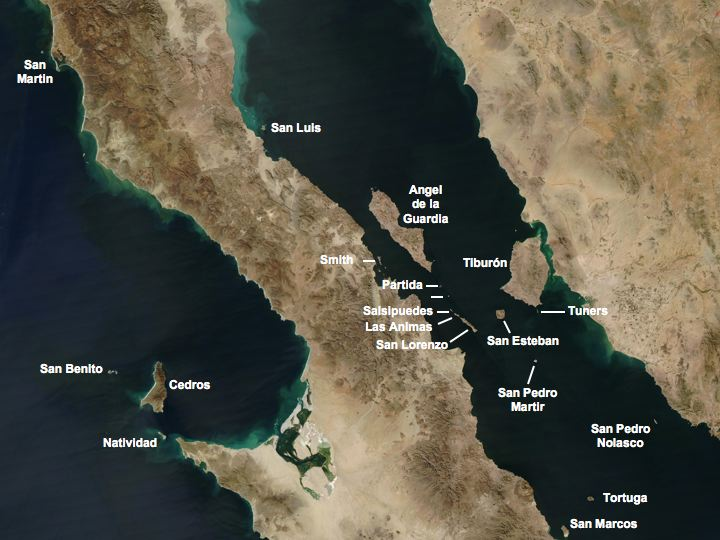
- Islands in the northern Gulf of California

Geography
- Location: Gulf of California
- Coordinates: 27°57′59″N 111°22′42″W
- Highest point: 1,075 feet (328 meters)

Administration
- Mexico
- State: Sonora

San Pedro Nolasco Island, sometimes called Seal Island, is a small and rugged Mexican island in the Gulf of California. It is 4.2 km long by 1 km wide, and lies 15 km from the nearest point of the Mexican coast and about 28 km west of the resort town of San Carlos on the coast of the Sonoran Desert. The island is protected as a nature reserve and its coastal waters are well known as a sport fishing and diving site.

== Flora and fauna ==
The island is home to the endemic cacti Echinocereus websterianus, Cochemiea multidigitata, and Mammillaria tayloriorum. Endemic fauna include the San Pedro Nolasco Island spinytail iguana (Ctenosaura nolascensis) and, formerly, Pemberton's deer mouse (Peromyscus pembertoni), a rodent which is now extinct. Large numbers of California sea lions frequent its surrounding waters and use the island as a haul-out.

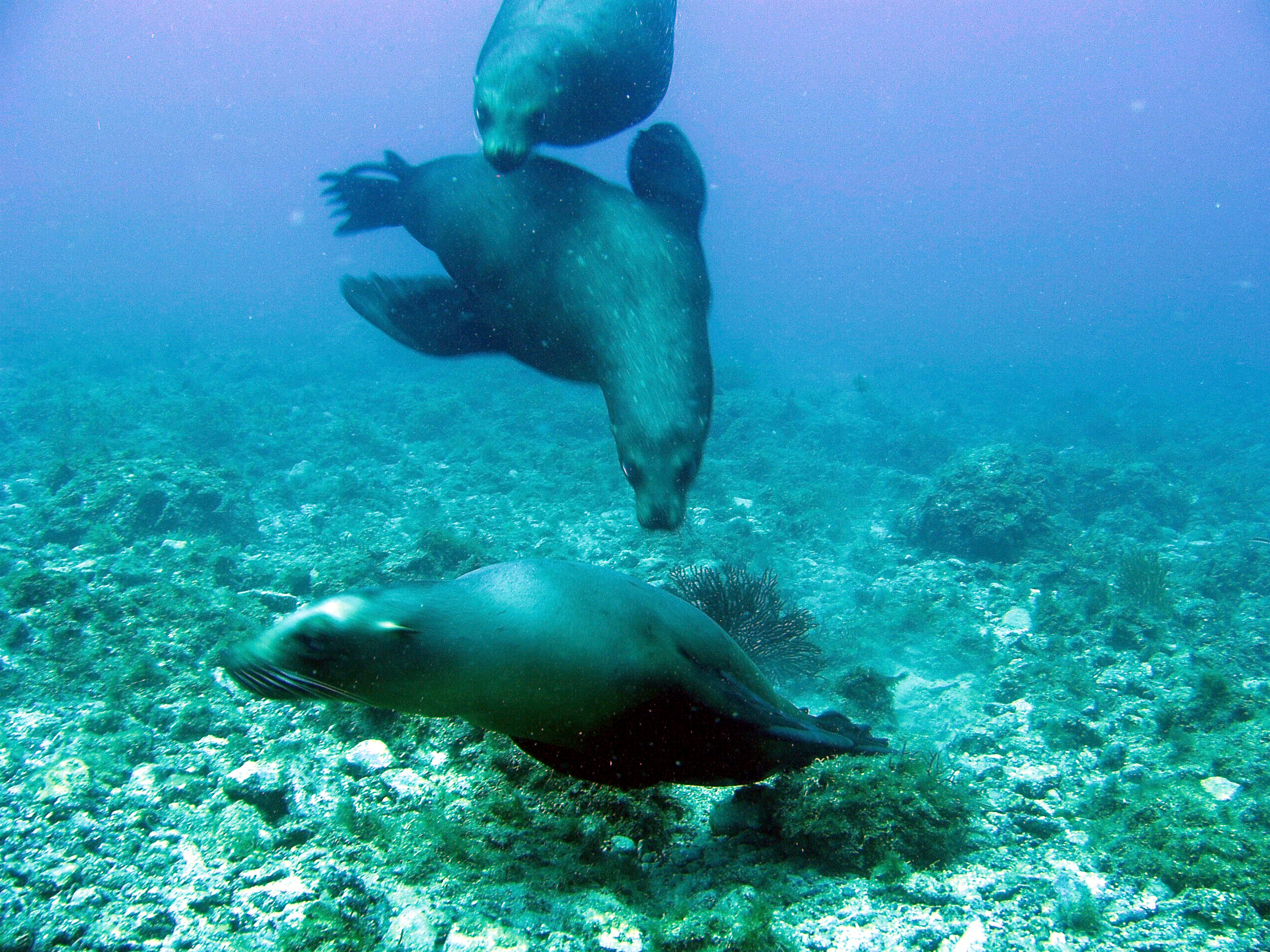
Sea lions playing at North Point dive site

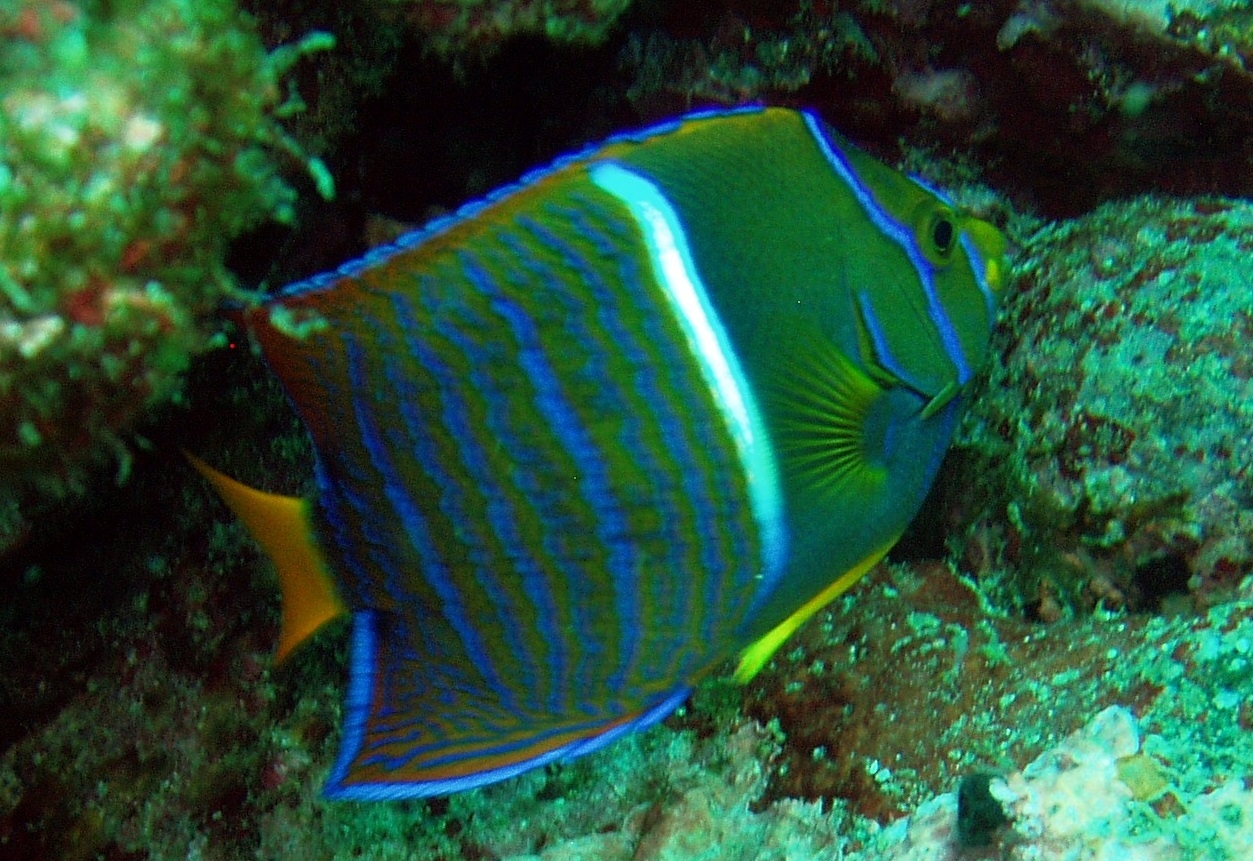
Passer angelfish (juvenile) in natural habitat. Lighthouse dive site

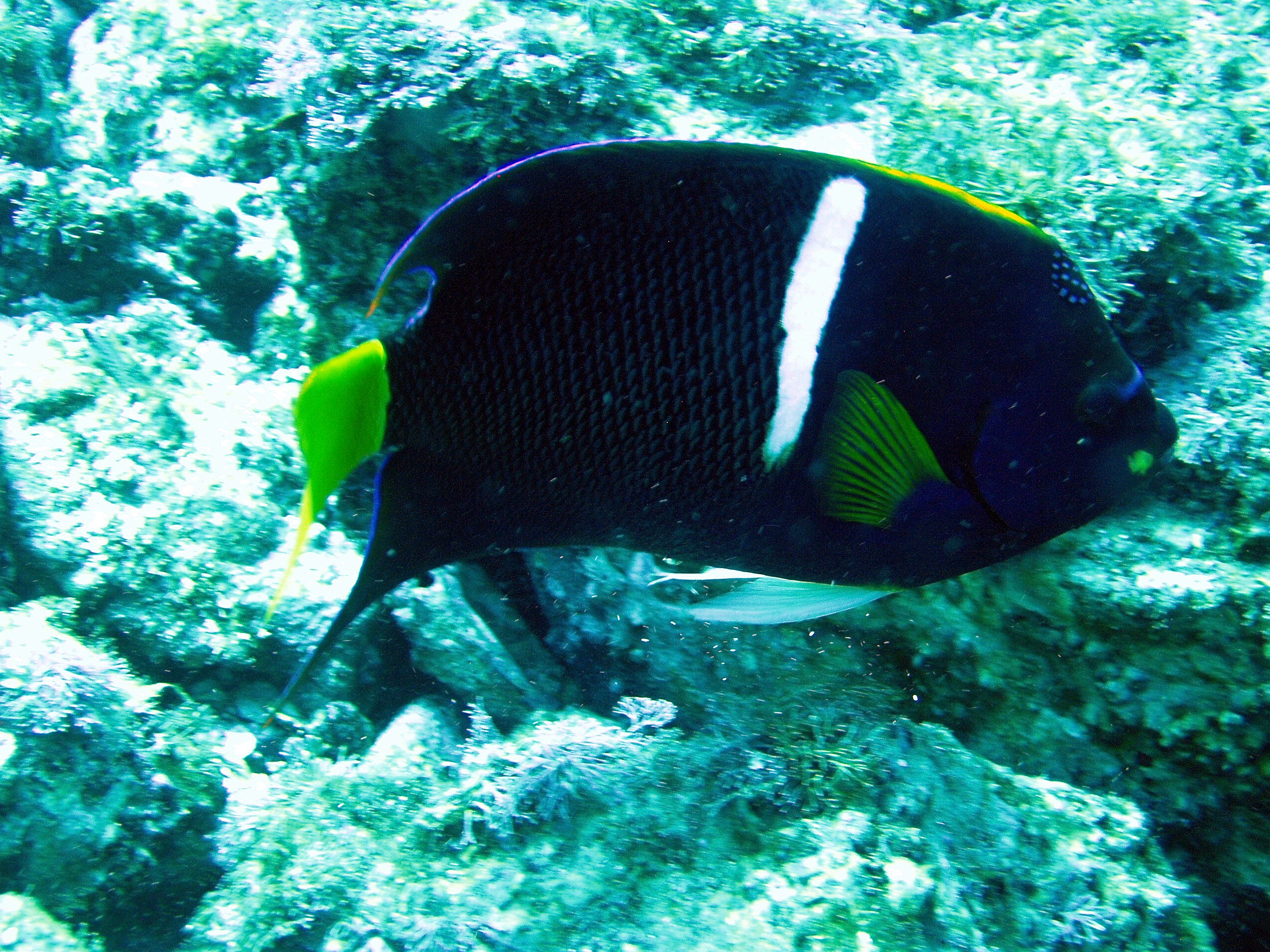
Passer angelfish (adult)

== Popular dive sites ==
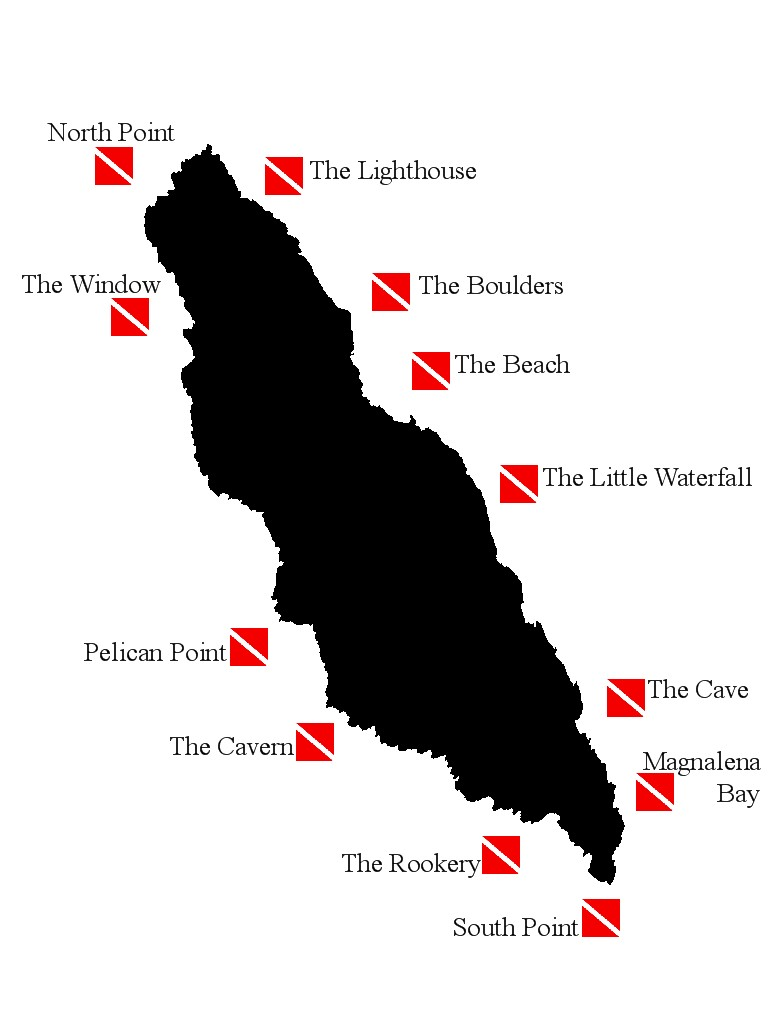
Divemaster map San Pedro Nolasco Island overview

Diver Samantha Scherrer finds an oyster shell at The Boulders site

- Magdalena Bay
- Lighthouse
- The Little Waterfall
- The Cave
- The Beach
- La Lobera
- North Point
- The Window
- Pelican Point
- The Cavern
- The Rookery
- South Point

=== Magdalena Bay ===
Magdalena Bay is a small protected cove on the southeast corner of the island. The water depths inside the bay are shallow, making it a site for novice divers and snorkelers. Consistent water clarity and bio-diversity offers even advanced divers a chance to see different wildlife. The gravel beach is used resting place for sea lions. Large numbers of sea lion pups, guarded by a dominant male can be observed during the summer months.

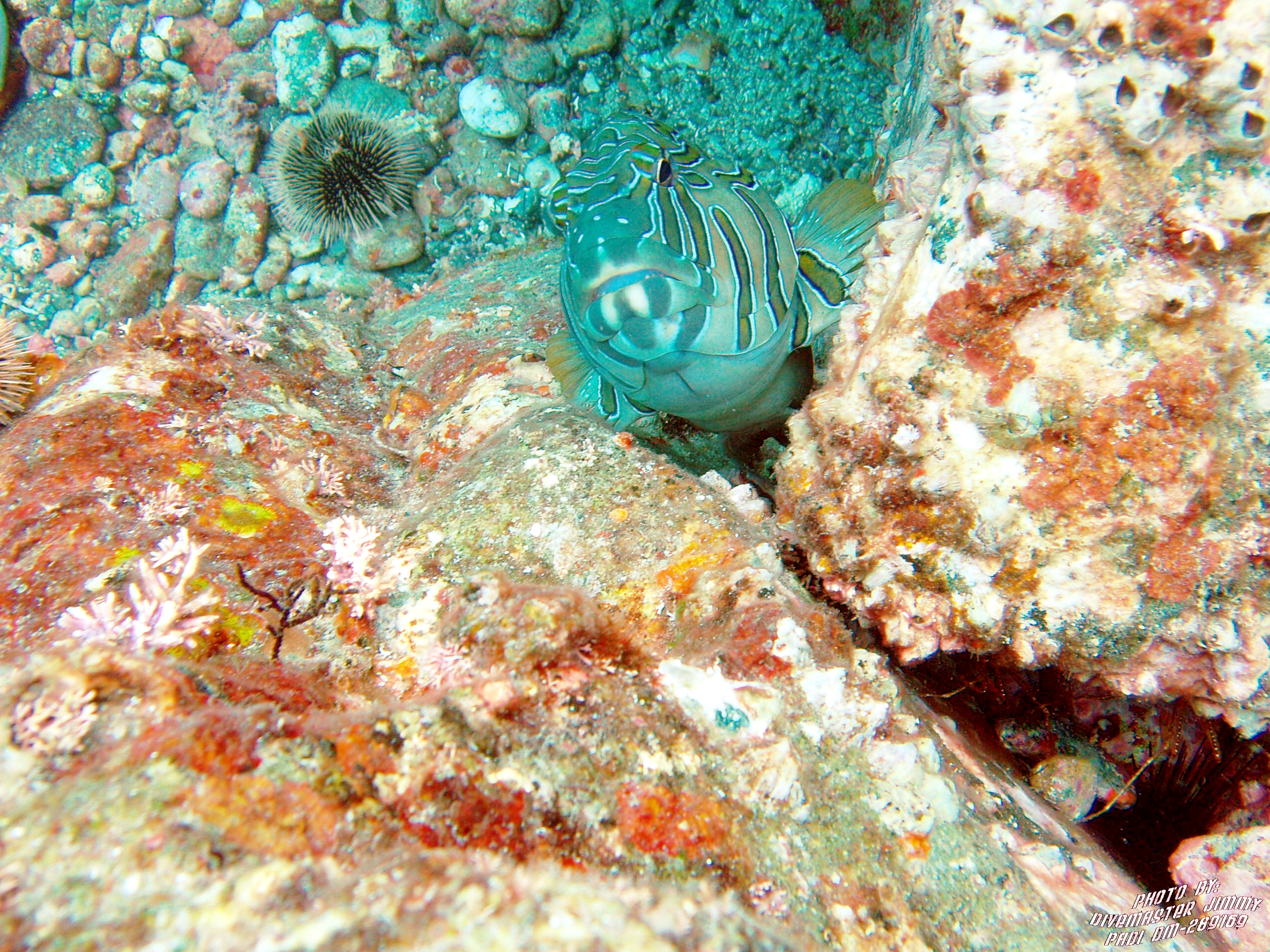
Giant hawkfish at Magdalena Bay

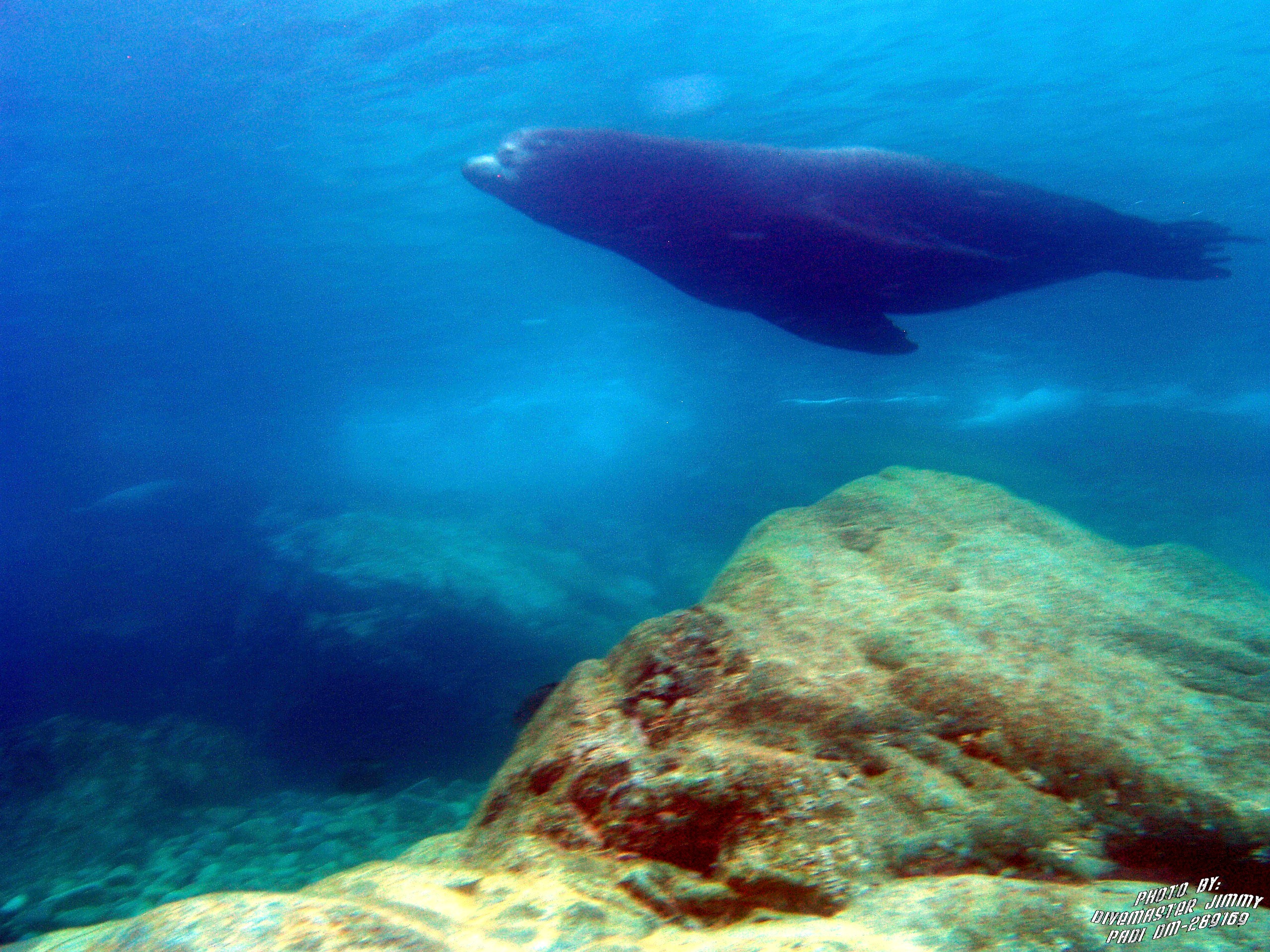
Sea lion bull at Magdalena Bay

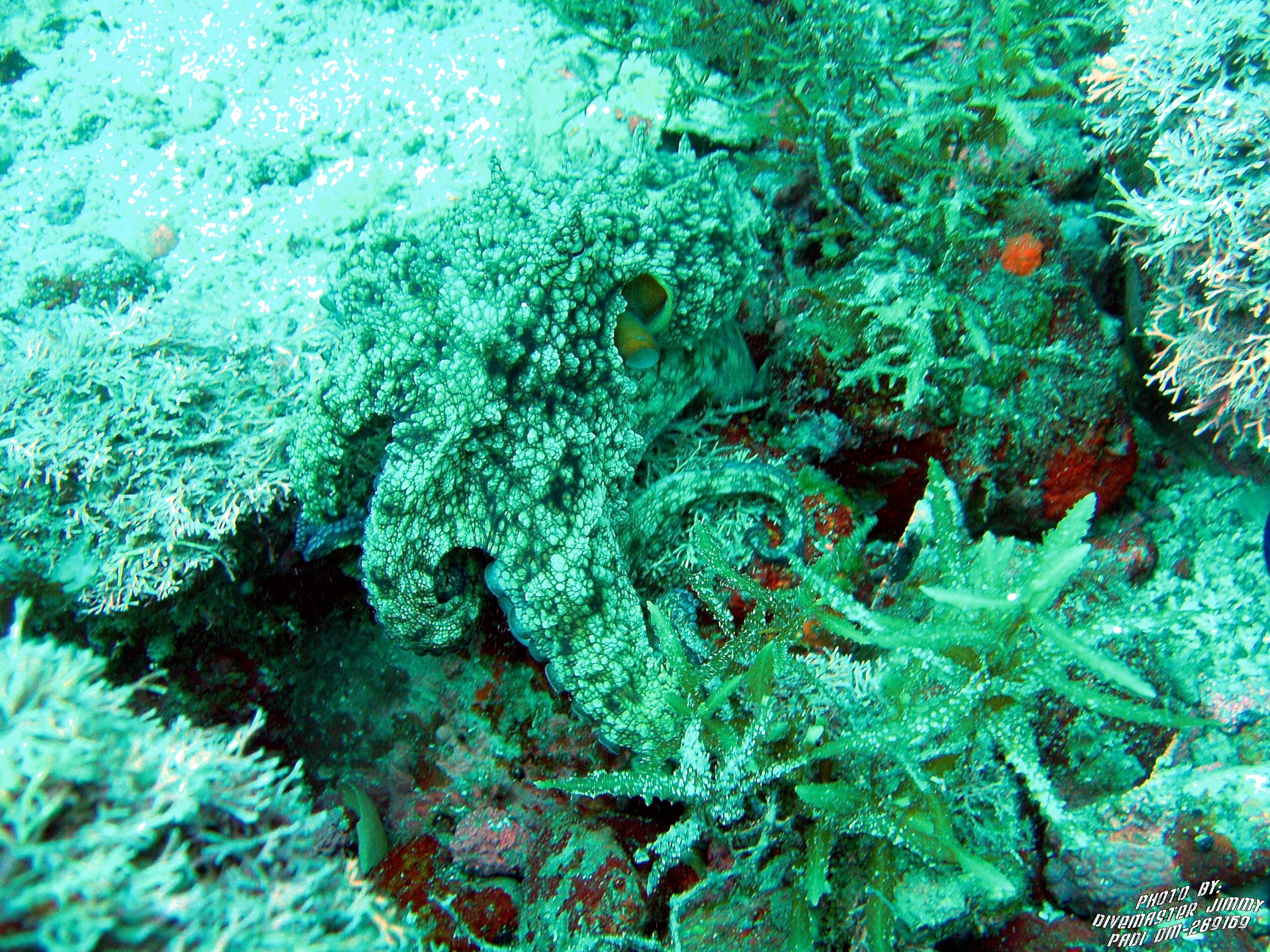
Octopus at Magdalena Bay

=== Lighthouse ===
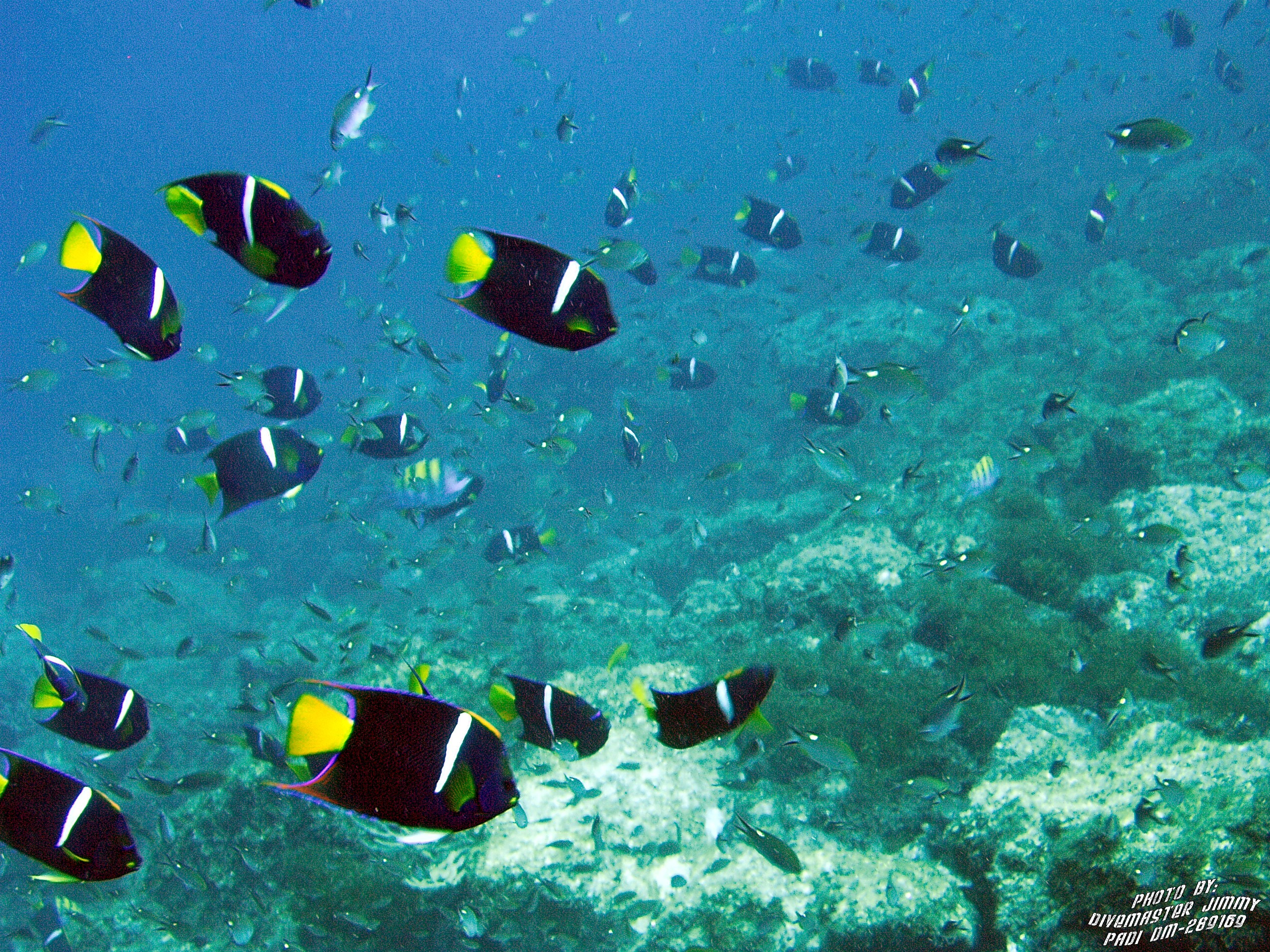
Reef fish at Lighthouse site

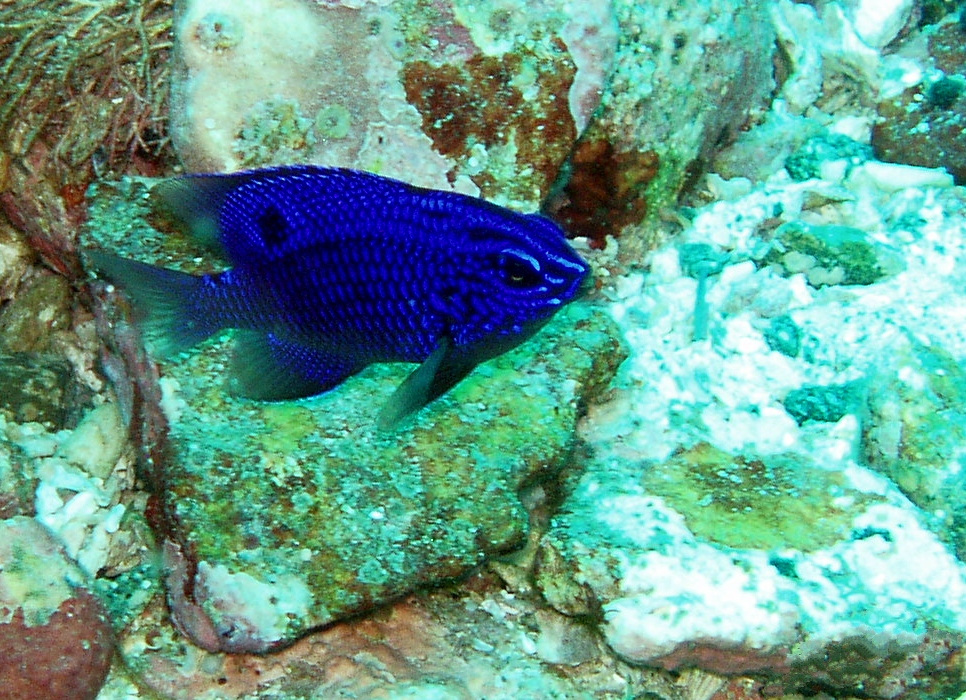
Cortez damselfish at Lighthouse site

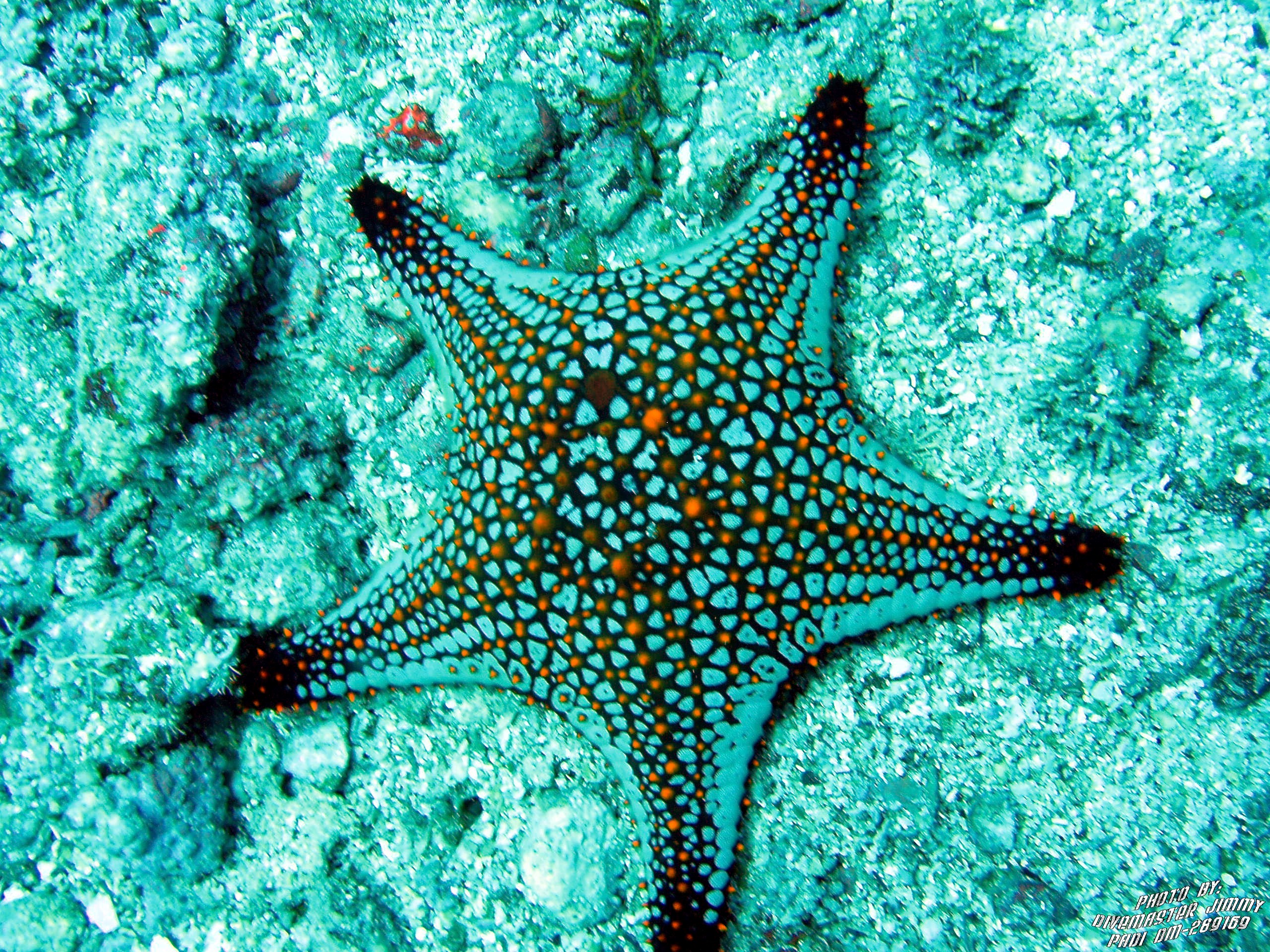
Starfish at Lighthouse site

=== North Point ===
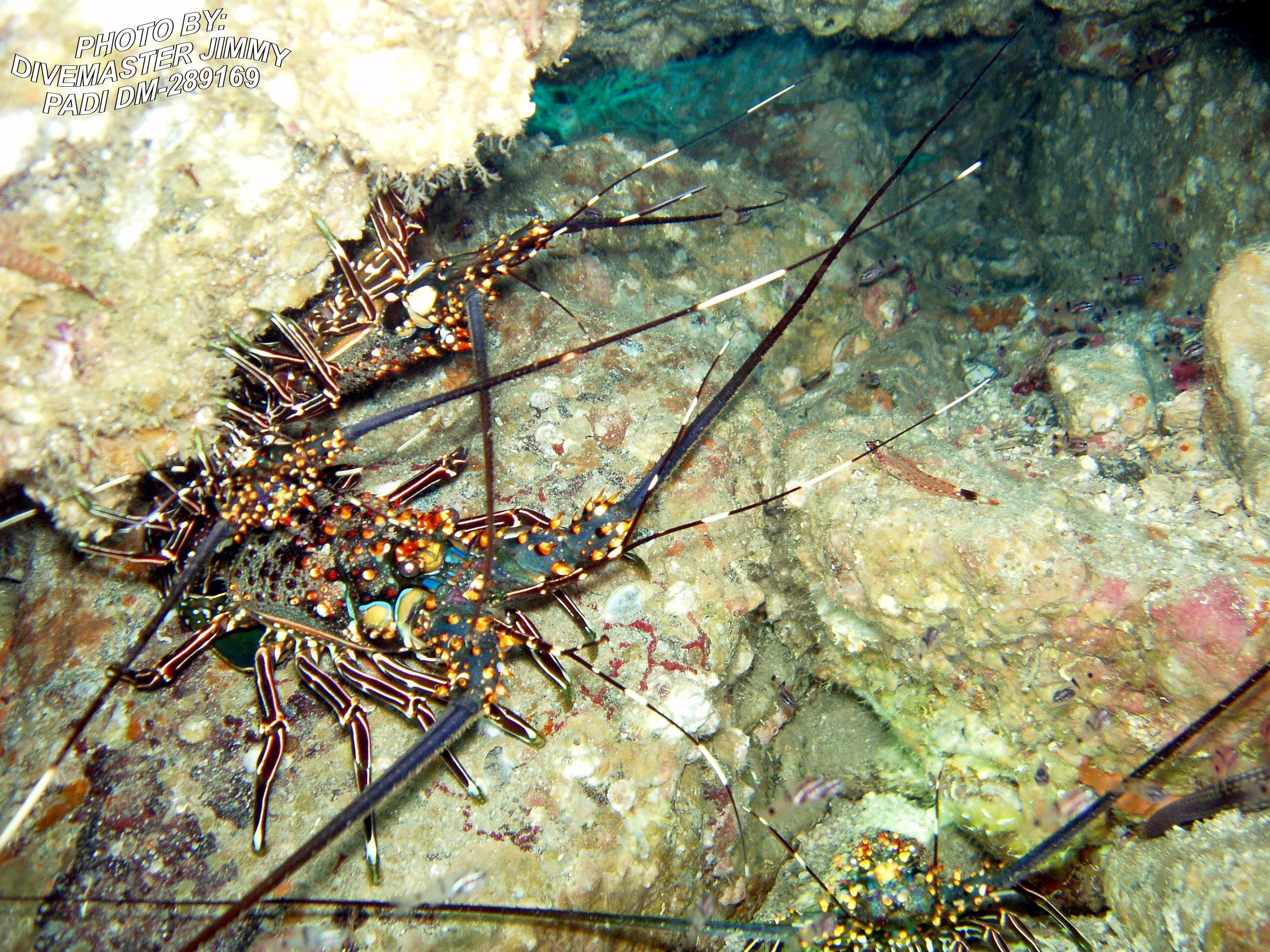
Spiney lobsters on the wall at North Point

== Transportation and island access ==
Arrangements for transportation to and from San Pedro Nolasco Island can be made through numerous charter boat operators and dive shops in nearby San Carlos. However, to go ashore at San Pedro Nolasco as well as most of the Islands in the Gulf of California (Sea of Cortez) a special permit must be purchased from the Mexican government. Such permits can be obtained at the local offices of the National Commission of Protected Natural Areas (Comision Nacional de Areas Naturales Protegidas).
