= George Edmund Lindsay =

American botanist (1916–2002)

George E. Lindsay
- Born: 17 August 1916; Pomona, California
- Died: July 16, 2002 (aged 85); Tiburon, California
- Scientific career
- Fields: Botany, Natural History
- Institutions: San Diego Natural History Museum; California Academy of Sciences
- Author abbrev. (botany): G.E.Linds.

George Edmund Lindsay (1916–2002) was an American botanist, naturalist, and museum director. From 1956 to 1963, he was director of the San Diego Natural History Museum and served as Director of the California Academy of Sciences from 1963 to 1982. At both institutions, Lindsay led research field expeditions to the islands in the Sea of Cortez (Vermilion Sea and Gulf of California) found between the Baja California Peninsula and mainland Sonora, Mexico. These expeditions relied on the Vermilion Sea Field Station at Bahia del Los Angeles as their base of operations, which he facilitated and organized. He was active in transnational conservation efforts to protect the islands as biodiversity sanctuaries in the Gulf of California.

== Biography ==
Lindsay was born in Los Angeles County, in Pomona, California, on August 17, 1916, to orchardists Alice H. Foster and Charles W. Lindsay. He attended Chaffey Junior College (in Ontario, California) and San Diego State College before finishing his undergraduate degree at Stanford University in 1950; he continued graduate studies at Stanford (studying with Ira L. Wiggins), completing his dissertation on the taxonomy and ecology of the cactus genus Ferocactus in 1955.

Lindsay specialized in desert plants, with field work in Mexico and the western United States. In 1940, he was executive director of the Desert Botanical Garden in Phoenix, Arizona. In 1956, Lindsay became director of the San Diego Natural History Museum, leading research expeditions throughout his tenure. He became director of the California Academy of Sciences in 1963.

== Selected publications ==
- Lindsay, George M. (1952). The Sefton Foundation - Stanford University Expedition to the Gulf of California, 1952. [Stanford, Calif.]: [Reprinted by Belvedere Scientific Fund].
- Lindsay, George E. (1955). Taxonomy and Ecology of the Genus Ferocactus [PhD dissertation]. Stanford University.
- Lindsay, George E. (1962). "The Belvedere Expedition to the Gulf of California". Transactions of the San Diego Society of Natural History. 13: 1–44. doi:10.5962/bhl.part.9595.
- Lindsay, George E. (1963). Cacti of San Diego County; a Non-Technical Guide. San Diego, CA: San Diego Society of Natural History.
- Lindsay, George E. (1964). The Sea of Cortez Expedition of the California Academy of Sciences, June 20-July 4, 1964. San Francisco.
- Lindsay, George E. (1966). "The Gulf Islands Expedition of 1966". Proceedings of the California Academy of Sciences. 4 (30): 309–355.
- Lindsay, George E.; Cota, J. Hugo (1966). Taxonomy and Ecology of the Genus Ferocactus: Explorations in the USA and Mexico. [California?]: Tireless Termites Press.
- Lindsay, George E. (1970). Some Natural Values of Baja California. San Francisco, Calif.: California Academy of Sciences.
- Lindsay, George E.; Flood, Merielle K. (1994). George Edmund Lindsay, Ph.D: Building a Natural History Museum (Oral History). San Francisco, CA: California Academy of Sciences.
