= Mamitu Gashe =

Fistula surgeon in Ethiopia

- Born: December 1946 (age 79); Cher Amba, Ethiopia
- Medical career
- Profession: Fistula surgeon
- Field: Obstetrics
- Institutions: Addis Ababa Fistula Hospital
- Sub-specialties: Obstetric fistula
- Awards: Gold Medal of the Royal College of Surgeons of England (1989)

Mamitu Gashe (born December 1946) is an Ethiopian fistula surgeon and surgical trainer at the Addis Ababa Fistula Hospital. After developing a severe obstetric fistula during prolonged labour as a teenager, she travelled to Addis Ababa and was treated by Australian obstetrician Catherine Hamlin and New Zealand obstetrician Reginald Hamlin. Gashe remained with the Hamlins after her treatment, progressing from hospital work to assisting in operations and eventually performing fistula repairs herself despite having had no formal medical education. She later became a trainer of doctors learning fistula surgery and was described in the World Journal of Surgery in 2015 as one of the world's most experienced obstetric fistula surgeons.

In 1989, Gashe and the Hamlins received the Gold Medal of the Royal College of Surgeons of England. In 2018, the BBC included her in its annual 100 Women list.

== Early life ==
Mamitu Gashe was born in December 1946 in the isolated farming village of Cher Amba in Ethiopia. Gashe was one of ten children in a subsistence-farming family. She did not attend school as a child. During her childhood she carried out domestic work, including fetching water and firewood and helping her mother prepare food. As a teenager, she entered an arranged marriage to a farmer.

Gashe became pregnant as a teenager. (Note: Published accounts differ on Gashe's precise age at the time: Kristof described her as 15, while Williams gives her age as 16.) Her labour continued for several days without assistance from anyone medically trained, and ended in the stillbirth of her son. The prolonged obstructed labour caused severe injuries, including an obstetric fistula, leaving her incontinent.

With Gashe's condition failing to improve after three weeks, the family decided to take her to Addis Ababa where her sister lived, hoping that they would be able to find help there. Gashe was carried across the mountainous terrain on a stretcher made from eucalyptus branches and goat skins until they reached Debre Sina, where they could catch a bus to Addis Ababa, 200 km away, to seek treatment.

== Surgical career ==
=== Recovery and early career ===
After reaching Addis Ababa, Gashe was first admitted to Empress Zewditu Memorial Hospital and received antibiotics and pain relief, but doctors told her that they could not repair her fistula there. She was subsequently taken to Princess Tsehai Memorial Hospital, where Catherine and Reginald Hamlin were treating women with obstetric fistulas. She was treated for several weeks until she was well enough to undergo surgery.

Gashe underwent ten operations over approximately two and a half years at Princess Tsehai Hospital. During her recovery, Gashe began helping around the hospital, including cleaning, fetching water and making beds for patients. She also organised work for other patients who were well enough to help. She remained at the hospital rather than returning to her village; she told her husband that she did not intend to come back, and told him that he could remarry.

Gashe gradually took on greater responsibilities at the hospital. When the principal nurse aide temporarily returned home, Gashe covered her duties. Her English improved as she worked with the Hamlins and other overseas medical staff, and she began interpreting between patients and doctors.

In mid-1974, Reginald Hamlin invited Gashe into the operating theatre during a fistula repair. She initially observed operations before being taught tasks including cutting sutures, swabbing the operative field and placing stitches. She continued her surgical training under the Hamlins, who prioritised the training of Ethiopian practitioners. Gashe later moved with the Hamlins to the Addis Ababa Fistula Hospital, which opened in 1974.

By 1987, Gashe had spent years assisting with fistula surgery and sometimes completing operations when the Hamlins were called away. That year, Catherine and Reginald Hamlin asked her to undertake a fistula repair independently, after which she began regularly performing operations herself.

=== Later career and international recognition ===
In 1989, a delegation from the Royal College of Surgeons of England visited the hospital. The College's president, colorectal surgeon Sir Ian Todd, asked to observe Gashe performing an operation after hearing about her work. Gashe, Catherine Hamlin and Reginald Hamlin subsequently received the college's Gold Medal that year in recognition of their work in fistula surgery.

Catherine Hamlin at the Hamlin Fistula Hospital in 2009

After 1991, when the military junta, the Derg, lost power in Ethiopia, increasing numbers of doctors travelled to Addis Ababa to study the treatment of obstructed labour and fistula surgery. Gashe became the principal instructor for visiting doctors learning fistula repair. Among the Ethiopian doctors she trained was Mekdes Daba, who later became Ethiopia's minister of health. In 2005, the journalist Nicholas Kristof reported that gynaecologists travelled from around the world to train at the hospital and were often taught by Gashe. British surgeon Brian Hancock, who trained in fistula repair in Addis Ababa, credited Gashe with guiding him during his early operations and stated that she had similarly advised many other visiting surgeons.

Gashe also travelled outside Ethiopia to operate on patients and teach fistula-repair techniques. She travelled to India in 2002 with Australian obstetrician and gynaecologist Andrew Browning to perform fistula operations and train doctors. Browning had begun working at the Addis Ababa Fistula Hospital in 2001 and had himself been trained in fistula surgery by Gashe. In 2003, Gashe and Browning worked aboard the Mercy Ships hospital ship MV Anastasis while it was stationed off Togo. They performed fistula operations aboard the ship and taught the surgery to other clinicians. Gashe has also delivered surgical training in Kenya, Tanzania and Uganda. She later undertook basic formal education herself; Kristof reported in 2005 that she had begun attending night school several years earlier and had reached approximately third grade level.

In 2014, Gashe was often training new postgraduate doctors. A 2015 review in the World Journal of Surgery described Gashe as "one of the world's most experienced obstetric fistula surgeons."

Gashe was named by the BBC in its 100 Women list of 2018. Gashe remained professionally and personally close to Catherine Hamlin after Reginald Hamlin's death in 1993, and cared for Catherine Hamlin during the period before Hamlin's death. In 2020, while Hamlin was seriously ill, the Ethiopian Society of Obstetricians and Gynecologists granted Gashe honorary membership and presented her with its Distinguished Service Award. Hamlin died on 18 March 2020, with Gashe at her bedside. Gashe's life, work and relationship with Catherine Hamlin are subjects of Sue Williams's 2020 book Healing Lives.

As of 2025, Gashe continued to spend time with surgeons and patients at the Addis Ababa Fistula Hospital. In June 2026, UNFPA Ethiopia featured her in the first episode of its Kibir Podcast.
