= TERREWODE =

Non-profit women's health organization

The Association for Rehabilitation and Re-Orientation of Women for Development, abbreviated as TERREWODE, is a leading Ugandan nonprofit organization. It pioneered best practices for the elimination of obstetric fistula in Uganda over 16 years. The organization focuses on maternal and reproductive health. Headquartered in Soroti, TERREWODE's efforts target the empowerment and education of young women in rural communities. TERREWODE's activism focuses on women's rights to maternal, reproductive and sexual health, as well as the treatment and social reintegration of victims of obstetric fistula.

== History ==
TERREWODE was founded in 1999 by Alice Emasu. Since then, it has evolved into one of the country's leading non-governmental organizations with four holistic programs to support both curable and incurable cases. These programs include: Awareness and Advocacy, Prevention, Treatment, and Social Reintegration. TERREWODE has collaborated with the Ugandan Ministry of Health, the United Nations, Amref Health Africa, and Gender Health to support over 4,000 women since its inception.

== Programs ==
=== Awareness and Advocacy ===
TERREWODE's Awareness and Advocacy program joins with partners such as the Obstetric Fistula Awareness and Advocacy Network (OFAAN), a network of trained outreach volunteers who identify cases and spread awareness. Volunteers identify women with the condition and connect them with TERREWODE for treatment opportunities. This program operates at district and community levels, and interacts with district authorities. It uses platforms such as law enforcement, health care services, media, schools, or other community organizations to connect victims to members. TERREWODE provides education on reproductive rights and training activities.

=== Prevention ===
TERREWODE's Prevention program is aimed at improving local health care and economic systems to prevent cases of obstetric fistula. One approach involves the creation and distribution of free birth kits at health centers to incentivize expectant mothers to receive care and give birth at health centers, resulting in fewer birth complications. This program uses OFAAN to provide fistula education, such as discussion about common causes and risk factors of the condition. OFAAN partners with schools to promote girls' rights. The OFAAN volunteer network does additional work in helping expectant mothers create a plan for the delivery of their baby, which includes encouraging them to save money, seek out health care and avoid risk factors for the condition.

=== Treatment ===
TERREWODE's Treatment program acts to identify women suffering from obstetric fistula and assist them in accessing treatment, typically involving surgery. TERREWODE partners with the Ugandan Ministry of Health, local health centers and local and international health personnel. TERREWODE requests grant funding to help women who otherwise may struggle to afford treatment. Grant funding has been used to provide additional training on treatment procedures to health personnel.

=== Social Reintegration ===
TERREWODE's social reintegration program targets women who have received or have attempted to receive treatment for their condition and aims to help them reposition themselves within their social environment. In 2013, TERREWODE received funding from the Worldwide Fistula Fund to establish a Social Re-Integration Center, offering services such as counseling, support groups and resources, nutritional guidance and training in income-generating activities.

== Terrewode Women's Community Hospital (TWCH) ==
TERREWODE has partnered with Hamlin Fistula USA to establish the Terrewode Women’s Community Hospital. After relative success in treating childbirth injuries in Ethiopia for forty-five years through the Addis Ababa Fistula Hospital, the organization moved to Uganda. The hospital will target the approximately 50,000 Ugandan women believed to be living with obstetric fistula.

== Staff ==
The organization is run by a group of local professionals, including:

- Alice Emasu: Founder and Executive Director
- Dr. Josephine Namugenyi: The Medical Director TWCH
- Lutie Kobusinge: Finance and Administration Manager
- Martha Ibeno: Head of Programs
- Apio Stella: Community Outreach Officer
- Adiedo Mary Phiona: Counselling and Psychosocial Services Officer
- Eboku Ronald: Finance and Accounts Assistant
- Edyegu Daniel Enwaku: Communications & Advocacy Officer
- Auma Rhoda: Chief Nurse TWCH

== Partners ==
TERREWODE partners with the following organizations:

- International Fistula Alliance, Australia
- Maternal Health Fund, USA
- Fistula e.V., Germany
- Terrewode Women's Fund
- The Republic of Uganda Ministry of Health
- Worldwide Fistula Fund
- The Fund for Global Human Rights
- One by One
- Global Fund for Women
- United Nations Population Fund
- USAID
- EngenderHealth
- Islamic Development Bank
- Birthing Project USA
- Direct Relief
- International Society of Obstetric Fistula Surgeons
- Independent Development Fund
- Urgent Action Fund for Women's Human Rights
- The Access Fund
- Uganda Local Governments Association
- Amref Health Africa
- Uganda Law Society
- Forgotten Mothers
- CoRSU Rehabilitation Hospital
- Kitovu Hospital Masaka
- Interagency Gender Working Group
- Fistula Foundation
- Uganda Women's Network
- Center for Domestic Violence Prevention
- Raising Voices
- Women at Work International
- Catherine Hamlin Fistula Foundation

== External Resources ==
- Photo Gallery: TERRAWODE in Uganda
- Video: Uganda Fistula Fund for TERREWODE
