= Urogenital fistula =

- Other names: Urogenital fistulas, urogenital fistulae

A urogenital fistula is an abnormal tract that exists between the urinary tract and bladder, ureters, or urethra. A urogenital fistula can occur between any of the organs and structures of the pelvic region. A fistula allows urine to continually exit through and out the urogenital tract. This can result in significant disability, interference with sexual activity, and other physical health issues, the effects of which may in turn have a negative impact on mental or emotional state, including an increase in social isolation. Urogenital fistulas vary in etiology (medical cause). Fistulas are usually caused by injury or surgery, but they can also result from malignancy, infection, prolonged and obstructed labor and delivery in childbirth, hysterectomy, radiation therapy or inflammation. Of the fistulas that develop from difficult childbirth, 97 percent occur in developing countries. Congenital urogenital fistulas are rare; only ten cases have been documented. Abnormal passageways can also exist between the vagina and the organs of the gastrointestinal system, and these may also be termed fistulas.

== Classification ==
Abnormal passageways or fistulas can exist between the vagina and bladder, ureters, uterus, and rectum with the resulting passage of urine from the vagina, or intestinal gas and feces into the vagina, in the case of a vaginal–rectal fistula. These vaginal fistulas are named according to the origin of the defect:

- vesicovaginal
- urethrovaginal
- ureterovaginal
- vesicocervical
- vesicouterine
- vesicouretovaginal
- uterocervical
- vesicocervical
- uretercervical
- ureteruterine

The vagina is susceptible to fistula formation because the gastrointestinal tract and urinary system are relatively close to the vagina. A small number of vaginal fistulas are congenital. The presence of a vaginal fistula has a profound effect on the quality of life since there is little control over the passage of urine and feces through the vagina.

Urogenital fistulas are often classified according to their cause: obstetric fistula, congenital fistula and iatrogenic fistula. Urogenital fistulas can be classified by size and more specific anatomical location such as 'upper vagina' or 'posterior vaginal wall'.

== Causes ==
In developed countries, the causes of fistulas are iatrogenic (caused by surgical accidents). Physician error and lack of training contribute to the unsuccessful treatment of obstetric fistulas in developing countries. Injuries to pelvic organs are a cause of fistulas. Most of those not caused by obstructed labor develop from injuries. An example of this would be the improper placement of an instrument during a hysterectomy. Fistulas can form after long-term pessary use, hysterectomies, malignant disease and pelvic irradiation, pelvic surgery, cancer or a pelvic fracture. Fistulas are sometimes found after a cesarean section. Providers can also inadvertently cause a fistula when performing obstetric or gynecological surgery. The more training the physician has had, the less likely a uro-vaginal fistula will occur. Some women develop more than one fistula.

== Treatment ==
Surgery is often needed to correct a fistula leading to the vagina. Conservative treatment with an in-dwelling catheter can be effective for small and recently formed urinary fistulas. It has a success rate of 93%. Collagen plugs are used but have been found not to be successful. The surgical treatment to correct can be approached in different ways. Surgery through the vagina is successful 90% of the time. Surgical correction can be accomplished by abdominal surgery, by laparoscopic and robot-assisted laparoscopic surgery. The various treatments vary in frequency. The transvaginal approach is used 39% of the time, transabdominal/transvesical approach is used 36% of the time, the laparoscopic/robotic approach is used to treat 15% of urogenital fistulas and a combination of transabdominal-transvaginal approach is used 3% of the time.

== Epidemiology ==
Globally, 75 percent of urogenital fistulas are obstructive labor fistulas. The average age of a woman who develops a fistula due to prolonged labor is 28 years old. The average age of a woman who develops a fistula from other causes is 42 years old. Women with a small pelvis are more likely to develop a fistula. Though rare, a fistula can form after the minimally invasive oocyte retrieval part of infertility treatment. Urogenital fistulas (vesicovaginal) caused by surgical complications occur at a frequency of 0.8 per 1000.

== Rectovaginal fistulas ==
Abnormal passage of stool through the vagina is caused by a rectovaginal fistula. Treatment is often surgical with the use of tissue grafts. The presence of bowel disease increases the risk of a rectovaginal fistula. An entero-vaginal fistula can form between the bowel and the vagina. Rectovaginal fistulae result from inflammatory bowel disease, Chrohn's disease trauma, or iatrogenic injury and diversions to other organs. Episiotomies can cause the formation of a rectovaginal fistula.

== See also ==
- Reproductive organs
- Urinary system
- Urogenital triangle
- Vaginal cysts
