= Double dye test =

Test for diagnosing fistula

- Purpose: diagnosing vesicovaginal or ureterovaginal fistulae.

Double dye test is useful for diagnosing vesicovaginal or ureterovaginal fistulae. For this test, the patient takes oral phenazopyridine (Pyridium) 200 mg three times a day, and indigo carmine or methylene blue is filled into the empty urinary bladder via a urethral catheter. Pyridium turns urine orange in the kidneys, and methylene blue (or indigo carmine) turns urine blue in the bladder.

A tampon is placed into the vagina. If the tampon turns blue, vesicovaginal fistula is suspected. If the tampon turns orange, ureterovaginal fistula is suspected. If the tampon turns blue and orange, suspect a combination of vesicovaginal and ureterovaginal fistulae. It is important to be alert for leakage around the catheter, which may spill back into the vagina creating the false impression of a fistula. It is also important to ensure that adequate distension of the bladder occurs as some fistulae do not leak at small volumes; conversely, some fistulae with an oblique track through the bladder wall may leak at small volumes, but not at capacity. Direct inspection of leaking dye in vagina in lithotomy position is better than the traditional 'three swab test' as multiple fistulae may be located in this way.

== See also ==
- Obstetric fistula
- Rectovaginal fistula
- Colposcopy
- Urinary incontinence
