= Terrewode Women's Community Hospital =

Coordinates: 01°45′33″N 33°35′13″E

- Association for the Rehabilitation and Re-orientation of Women for Development (TERREWODE)

Geography
- Location: Arapai, Soroti District, Uganda

Organisation
- Care system: Community hospital
- Type: General and specialist
- Affiliated university: Soroti Regional Referral Hospital

Services
- Emergency department: I
- Beds: 60

History
- Founded: 2019 (Expected)

Links
- Website: Homepage
- Other links: Hospitals in Uganda

Terrewode Women's Community Hospital, is a community hospital, under construction in Uganda, that specializes in the prevention, treatment, surgical correction and rehabilitation of obstetric fistula and its complications.

== Location ==
The hospital is located in Awasi Village, Arapai sub-county, in Soroti District, in the Eastern Region of Uganda, approximately 7.5 kilometres (5 mi), by road, northwest of the town of Soroti, the nearest large town. This is approximately 300 kilometres (186 mi), by road, northeast of Kampala, the national capital and largest city of Uganda.

== Overview ==
In Uganda, obstetric fistula is a major public health problem with over 140,000 women living with fistula. At least 1,900 new cases of fistula are registered in the country, every year.

The hospital sits on a 6 acres (24,000 m^{2}) piece of land, purchased with money from the Uganda Fistula Fund. The objective of the hospital is to provide health services for obstetric fistula and other child birth-related injuries. It is modeled after the Addis Ababa Fistula Hospital, founded by Australian Obstetrician and Gynecologist, Catherine Hamlin.

Terrewode, the Soroti-based non-profit, has been active against obstetric fistula in the Teso sub-region since 2002. More than 4,000 women have been supported by Terrewode in collaboration with the Uganda Ministry of Health, United Nations Population Fund, Amref Health Africa and Gender Health.

== Construction ==
The first phase of construction is budgeted to cost US$1.6 million (approx. USh5.8 billion), and expected to last eight months. The International Fistula Alliance is funding this phase. Gabikan Engineering Limited Construction Company was selected as the contractor for phase 1, consisting of the main hospital block. The second phase, consisting the out-patient clinic, maternity department and staff quarters, will follow after the first, allowing the hospital to provide obstetric services.

== Fundraising ==
In September 2017, the Speaker of the Uganda's parliament, received US$1 million from Ugandan diasporians, donated towards the construction of this hospital.

== See also ==
- Hospitals in Uganda
- Addis Ababa Fistula Hospital
