= Nasrin Oryakhil =

Afghan gynecologist and obstetrician

- نسرین اوریاخیل
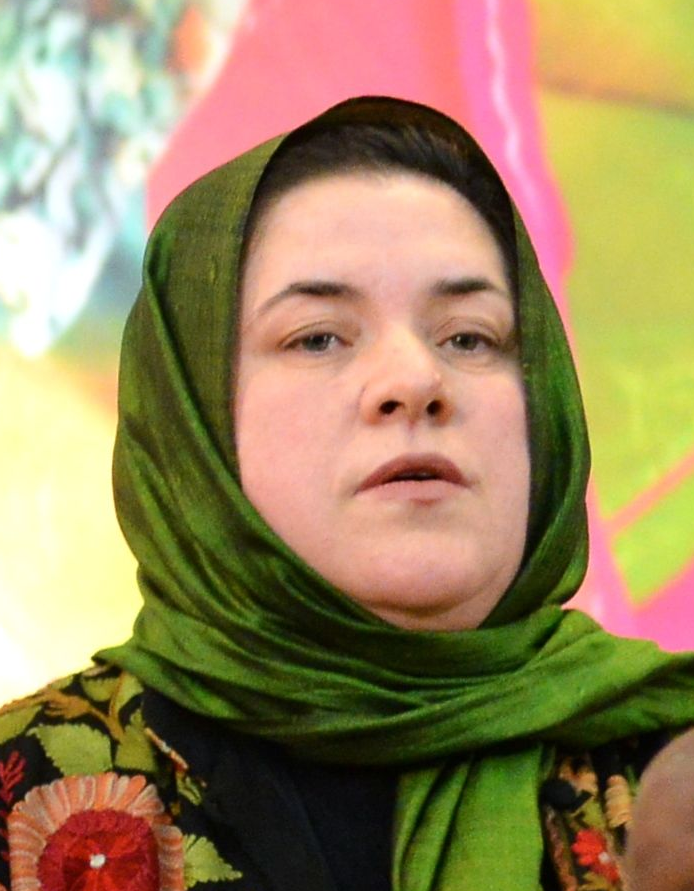

Personal details
- Born: 1964 (age 61–62) Kabul, Afghanistan

Nasrin Oryakhil (born 1964) is an Afghan minister, gynecologist and obstetrician. She won awards for her work and in 2015 she was made a minister.

== Early life ==
Oryakhil was born in 1964 in Kabul.

== Career ==
She is a gynecologist and obstetrician, and since 2004 she has been the Director of the Malalai Maternity Hospital in Kabul, Afghanistan. She founded inside that hospital the first clinic for obstetric fistula repair in Afghanistan. She is the president of the NGO Afghan Family Health Association, and a member of the Afghan Women's Network, as well as part of the group whose task is to create a Medical Council in Afghanistan. She also supported the creation of the Afghan Midwives Association.

== Politics ==
In 2015 she was made a minister for Labor in Afghanistan. She was one of four women amongst the last sixteen additions to Ashraf Ghani's government of national unity. Other candidates had to withdraw and these last additions were intended to not have dual nationality. On 12 November 2016, she was dismissed from the office by the Afghan parliament.

== Awards ==
She received a 2014 International Women of Courage award.
