= Fecal vomiting =

- Other names: Feculent vomiting, stercoraceous vomiting, copremesis

Fecal vomiting or copremesis is a form of vomiting wherein the material vomited is of fecal origin. It is a common symptom of gastrojejunocolic fistula and intestinal obstruction in the ileum. Fecal vomiting is often accompanied by gastrointestinal symptoms, including abdominal pain, abdominal distension, dehydration, and diarrhea. In severe cases of bowel obstruction or constipation (such as those related to clozapine treatment) fecal vomiting has been identified as a cause of death.

Fecal vomiting occurs when the bowel is obstructed for some reason, and intestinal contents cannot move normally. Peristaltic waves occur in an attempt to decompress the intestine, and the strong contractions of the intestinal muscles push the contents backwards through the pyloric sphincter into the stomach, where they are then vomited.

Fecal vomiting can also occur in cats.

Fecal vomiting does not include vomiting of the proximal small intestine contents, which commonly occurs during vomiting.

Fecal vomiting has been cited in liver cancer, ovarian cancer, and colorectal cancer cases.
