= Enterocutaneous fistula =

Abnormal passageway between the intestines and the skin

An enterocutaneous fistula (ECF) is an abnormal connection between the small or large bowel and the skin that allows the contents of the stomach or intestines to leak through an opening in the skin.

== Causes ==
The mnemonic HIS FRIENDS can be used to memorize characteristics which impede the closure of ECF.

H: High output
I: Inflammatory bowel disease
S: Short tract
F: Foreign body
R: Radiation
I: Infection (e.g., diverticulitis)
E: Epithelialization
N: Neoplasm
D: Distal obstruction
S: Short tract (<2 cm)

== Diagnosis ==
=== Classification ===
Congenital types: tracheoesophageal, vitellointestinal duct, patent urachus, rectovaginal

Acquired: trauma (postoperative), radiation, malignancy, infection

=== Two categories ===
Low-output fistula: < 500 mL/day

High-output fistula: > 500 mL/day

=== Three categories ===
Low-output fistula: < 200 mL/day

Moderate-output fistula: 200–500 mL/day

High-output fistula: > 500 mL/day

== Treatment ==
The majority will close spontaneously within approximately 6 weeks. If it has not closed by 12 weeks, it is unlikely to do so and definitive surgery should be planned. The median time to definitive repair from fistula onset was 6 months (range 1 day to 28 months). The 6-month time course is commonly utilized by groups with significant experience treating fistulas, owing to the trend in encountering a less hostile abdomen than in the early phases. Some evidence also suggests that somatostatin can be an effective treatment with respect to reducing closure time and improving the spontaneous closure rate of enterocutaneous fistulas.
