= Fistula Foundation =

American maternal health organization

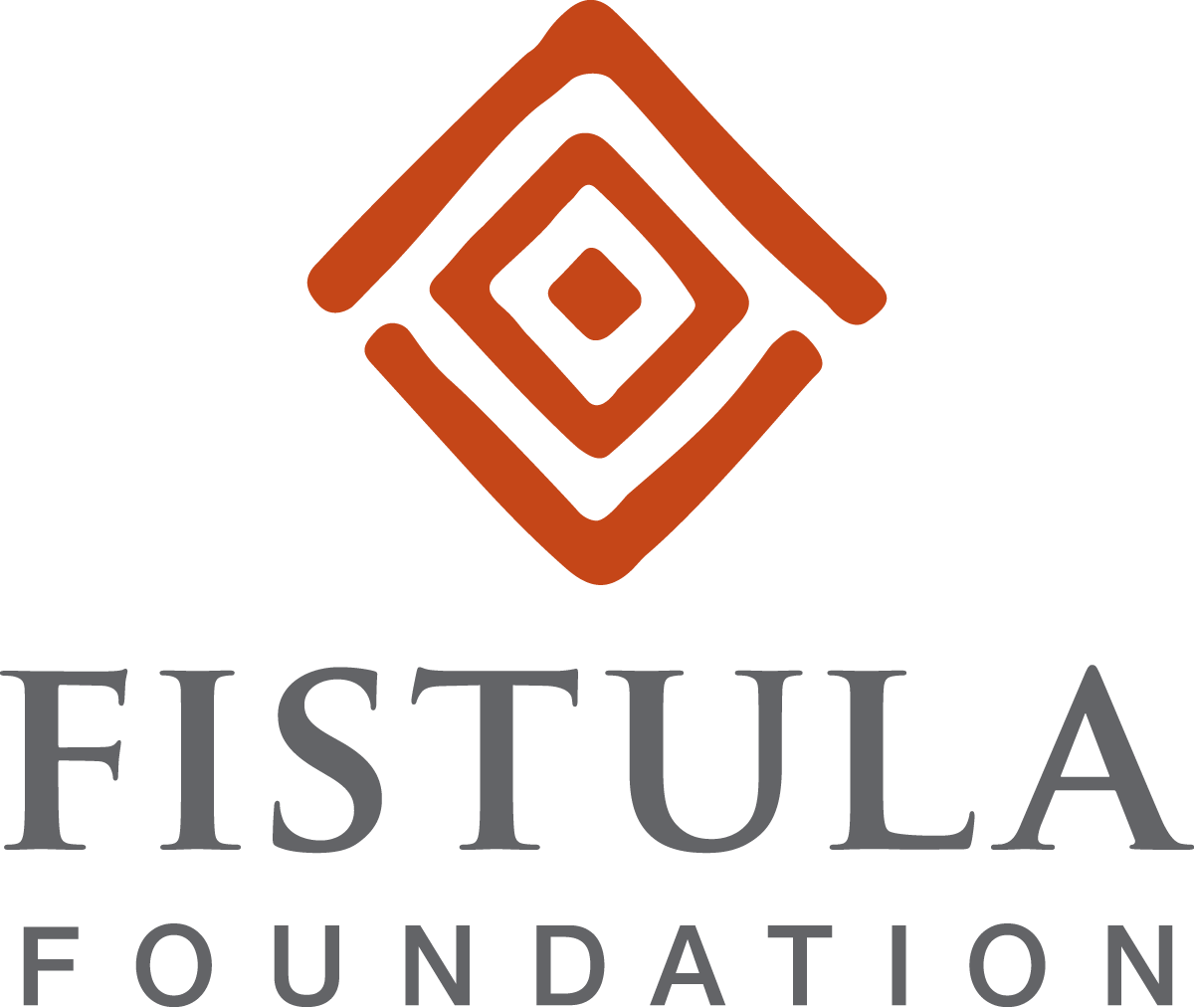
- Founders: Richard Haas; Shaleece Haas
- Type: Nonprofit
- Purpose: Maternal health
- Location: San Jose, California, United States
- Region served: Africa, Asia
- Method: Aid
- Chief Executive Officer: Pam Lowney
- Revenue: $28.0 m USD (2023)
- Expenses: $22.9 m USD (2023)
- Website: fistulafoundation.org

Fistula Foundation is a nonprofit 501(c)(3) organization focused on treating obstetric fistula, a health condition affecting poor women in developing countries. As of 2024, the foundation had supported over 100,000 surgeries in over 35 countries. The foundation covers the full cost of fistula repair surgery for women who cannot afford it. It also funds public education campaigns for potential patients, patient outreach and screening, surgery training, and post-surgery support.

The foundation has been recommended by commentator Nicholas Kristof and philosopher Peter Singer (through his book The Life You Can Save) as a highly impactful charity. In 2023, the foundation received a $15 million gift from philanthropist MacKenzie Scott.

== Focus ==
The majority of funds directly pay for the cost of surgeries, which cost about US$598 in 2022 (equivalent to $658 in 2025). The foundation also sets up treatment networks focused on finding patients, training health care professionals in fistula surgery, expanding health care facilities, and post-surgery rehabilitation. The treatment networks aim' to treat all fistula patients in a country. As of 2022, the organization had treatment networks in Kenya and Zambia.

As of 2024, the organization is active in 26 countries in Africa and Asia. In 2024, the organization reported that it supported over 100,000 surgeries across 35 countries. The top three countries by number of surgeries supported were Kenya, Nigeria, and the Democratic Republic of the Congo.

== History ==
The Fistula Foundation was founded in 2000 by Richard and Shaleece Haas as a volunteer organization supporting the Addis Ababa Fistula Hospital in Ethiopia. In 2009, the organization expanded to a global scope. Its first partner outside of Ethiopia was Denis Mukwege in the Democratic Republic of the Congo.

In 2014, according to a paper written by Fistula Foundation staff, the foundation launched a Fistula Treatment Network (formally called Action on Fistula) in Kenya, an effort to increase access to free fistula surgery for women. The network collaborated with community serving organizations to reach out to prospective patients and link them to healthcare providers who could provide the surgery at no cost. The initiative partnered with the International Federation of Gynaecology and Obstetrics to train healthcare providers in treating fistula. The initiative also developed programs to help patients reintegrate into society after surgery, such as follow-up visits, support groups, and vocational training. Between 2014 and 2020, 5,720 patients with fistula were treated with surgeries for free. Astellas Pharma EMEA provided seed funding for the program.

In 2017, the Fistula Foundation launched a second Fistula Treatment Network in Zambia. Between 2017 and 2023, at least 1,439 women underwent treatment, of which 88% had successful outcomes (on discharge from hospital, the fistula was closed with no urinary incontinence).

In 2025, the Fistula Foundation, along with the Federal Ministry of Health and Social Welfare, opened the Fistula Foundation Treatment Network in Nigeria. The goal of the FFTN is to expand access to free surgeries and rehabilitation to women affected by obstetric fistula.

== Offices and leadership ==
The Fistula Foundation is headquartered in San Jose, California, and has offices in Kenya and Zambia. In 2023, the organization raised $28.0 million USD and spent $22.9 million USD.

Fistula Foundation is led by CEO Pam Lowney, who joined the organization in 2018, and served as chief operating officer from 2022-2025. The chair of the Board of Directors is Cleo Kiros.

== Ratings ==
Fistula Foundation has earned a four-star rating on Charity Navigator every year since 2006, based largely on Accountability & Finance criteria. The foundation has received an 'A' rating from CharityWatch.

The foundation was a recommended charity in the 10th anniversary edition of ethicist professor Peter Singer's book, The Life You Can Save. Singer's related organization, also called The Life You Can Save, includes Fistula Foundation on its list of the "best charities" for high impact.

In 2021, the charity evaluator GiveWell said of the foundation: "We think that Fistula Foundation may be in the range of cost-effectiveness of our current top charities. However, this estimate is highly uncertain for a number of reasons." Givewell listed outstanding questions about whether other organizations would step in, long-term results of surgery, and the value of the fistula repair.

== Media ==
Journalist and commentator Nicholas D. Kristof positively covered the foundation's work in his New York Times column, first in October 2009. In 2024, Kristof named the Fistula Foundation as one of three awardees of the Holiday Impact Prize. The Fistula Foundation received $50,000 directly as part of the award. Kristoff also encouraged readers of his column to donate to the foundation.

The foundation was a sponsor of the 2007 documentary film A Walk to Beautiful, a film about women in Ethiopia who receive treatment for fistula.

In 2015, the investment firm The Motley Fool selected Fistula Foundation for its "Foolanthropy" holiday fundraising drive. They reported that they raised over $75,000.

In 2016, comedian Louis C.K. raised $50,000 for the Fistula Foundation on Celebrity Jeopardy.

In 2023, philanthropist MacKenzie Scott donated $15 million to the Fistula Foundation. The organization said that the donation would fund its five-year plan to provide 80,000 surgeries, launch treatment networks to five new countries, and add 40 additional organizations to its network.
