= John Peter Mettauer =

American surgeon and gynecologist (1787–1875)

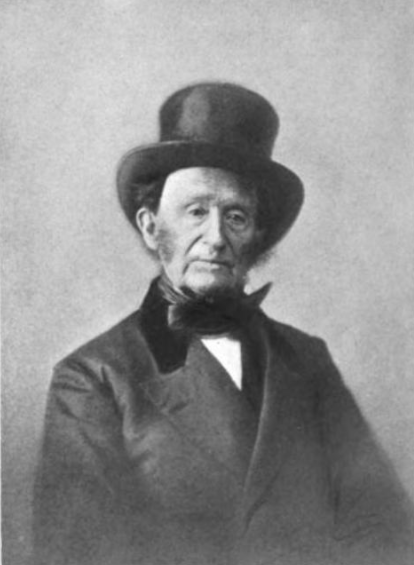
- Born: 1787; Prince Edward County, Virginia
- Died: November 22, 1875 (aged 87); Prince Edward County, Virginia
- Occupations: Surgeon, gynecologist

John Peter Mettauer (1787–1875) was an American surgeon and gynecologist. He was the son of surgeon Francis Joseph Mettauer.

== Biography ==
John Peter Mettauer was born in Prince Edward County, Virginia in 1787. He was a pupil at Hampden-Sydney College, followed by studies at the University of Pennsylvania, where he obtained his medical doctorate in 1809. In 1837 he founded a private medical school located between Prince Edward Court House and Kingsville, Virginia. In 1847 he allied his school with Randolph-Macon College, becoming the first medical department at Randolph-Macon.

Mettauer is remembered for his development of innovative surgical practices. Along with his two sons, he trained many physicians at his private medical school. In 1838, he performed the first successful repair of vesicovaginal fistula in America, preceding George Hayward (1839) in Massachusetts and J. Marion Sims (1840s) in Alabama. He is credited with performing the first cleft palate operation in the Americas (1827).

Mettauer also designed and developed his own surgical instruments, some of which are on display at the Esther Thomas Atkinson Museum at Hampden-Sydney College. Also, The John Peter Mettauer Award for Excellence in Research is a prestigious award issued by Hampden-Sydney College.

He died from kidney disease at his home in Prince Edward County on November 22, 1875.
