= M. Ijaiya's technique =

Surgical procedure to close juxtacervical vesicovaginal fistulae

- Specialty: Urogynaecology

M. Ijaiya's technique is a surgical procedure that involves the use of the posterior lip of the cervix to close juxtacervical vesicovaginal fistulae.

== Indications ==
The use of the posterior lip of the cervix to close juxtacervical fistulae (M. Ijaiya's technique) may be particularly useful when the anterior lip of the cervix is involved in the pressure necrosis and it is difficult to achieve a tension-free repair.

This technique is recommended for postmenopausal patients with a normal cervical smear and endometrial biopsy.

It is easier, less time-consuming and less bloody than abdominal route repair. Vaginal capacity is preserved.
