= A Walk to Beautiful =

2007 film by Mary Olive Smith

- Directed by: Mary Olive Smith
- Produced by: Steven M. Engel; Mary Olive Smith
- Edited by: Andrew Ford
- Music by: David Schommer
- Distributed by: Engel Entertainment
- Release dates: May 5, 2007 (San Francisco Film Festival); February 8, 2008 (United States)
- Running time: 85 minutes
- Country: United States
- Language: English

A Walk to Beautiful is a 2007 American documentary film, executive produced by Steven M. Engel and Helen Diana ("Heidi") Reavis, produced and distributed by Engel Entertainment, about women who suffer from childbirth injuries in Ethiopia. In 2007, it premiered in film festivals and was chosen for the International Documentary Association Best Feature Documentary Film of the Year award. The following year, the film opened in theaters in the United States in New York, Los Angeles, and San Francisco. A 52-minute version of A Walk to Beautiful that premiered on NOVA on PBS on May 13, 2008, won the 2009 Emmy Award in the Outstanding Informational Programming (Long Form) category on September 21, 2009, at the News and Documentary Emmy Awards ceremony on September 21, 2009, at Rose Hall, Lincoln Center in New York City.

== Production and release ==
The film was funded by Engel Entertainment and also received grants from NOVA, Fistula Foundation, the Marianthi Foundation, UNFPA, the Fledgling Film Fund, and private donors.

A Walk to Beautiful premiered in 2007 and was theatrically released by its production company, Engel Entertainment, in the United States on February 8, 2008 in New York and on February 29, 2008, in Los Angeles. This same year, it airs on Public Broadcasting Service's Nova series, starting from May 13, 2008.

== Synopsis ==
A Walk to Beautiful tells the stories of five women in Ethiopia who are ostracized by their family and villages due to their suffering from obstetric fistula, a serious medical condition caused by failed childbirth under conditions of insurmountable poverty and inadequate health care. These women live in isolation with a sense of loneliness and shame due to rejection by their own. Each of these five women chose to reclaim her life by taking the long and exhausting journey to the Addis Ababa Fistula Hospital, so she could receive the medical treatment available only there. Upon arriving at the hospital, the women are treated free of charge, resulting in new beginnings. Not every patient can be cured, but each woman takes her own journey toward becoming an independent and productive member of her community once again.

== Reception ==
=== Critical reaction ===
The documentary was given positive reviews by critics. Metacritic reported the film had an average score of 82 out of 100, based on six reviews, classifying A Walk to Beautiful as a universal acclaim. It was regarded as "competently made, precisely shot, and buoyantly humanistic" by Variety, and Kenneth Turan of the Los Angeles Times commented that "A Walk to Beautiful will leave you speechless two times over — first with despair, then with joy. Neither unmentionable subject matter nor nonexistent commercial prospects can keep this documentary from having a power over your heart that is unparalleled." According to The New York Times, A Walk to Beautiful quietly criticises a chauvinist society in some countries where women are considered "lovers, mothers, and servants", and anyone who cannot fulfill these roles is disregarded by her community.

=== Box office ===
As of February 2008, the film had grossed $7,718 in the United States.

=== Nominations and awards ===
A Walk to Beautiful was awarded the Emmy in the Informational Programming (Long Form) category on September 21, 2009, by the NATAS. It was named by the International Documentary Association as the Best Feature documentary film of the year. It received the Golden Gate Award at the San Francisco International Film Festival and the Audience Choice Award and Interfaith Award for Best Documentary at the 16th Annual AT&T St. Louis International Film Festival.

At the international Denver Film Festival, it was given People’s Choice Award for best documentary.
