= Gastrojejunocolic fistula =

Gastrointestinal disorder in humans

A gastrojejunocolic fistula is a disorder of the human gastrointestinal tract. It may form between the transverse colon and the upper jejunum after a Billroth II surgical procedure. (The Billroth procedure attaches the jejunum to the remainder of the stomach.) Fecal matter thereby passes improperly from the colon to the stomach, and causes halitosis.

Patients may present with diarrhea, weight loss and halitosis as a result of fecal matter passing through the fistula from the colon into the stomach.
