= Catherine Hamlin =

Australian obstetrician and gynecologist (1924–2020)

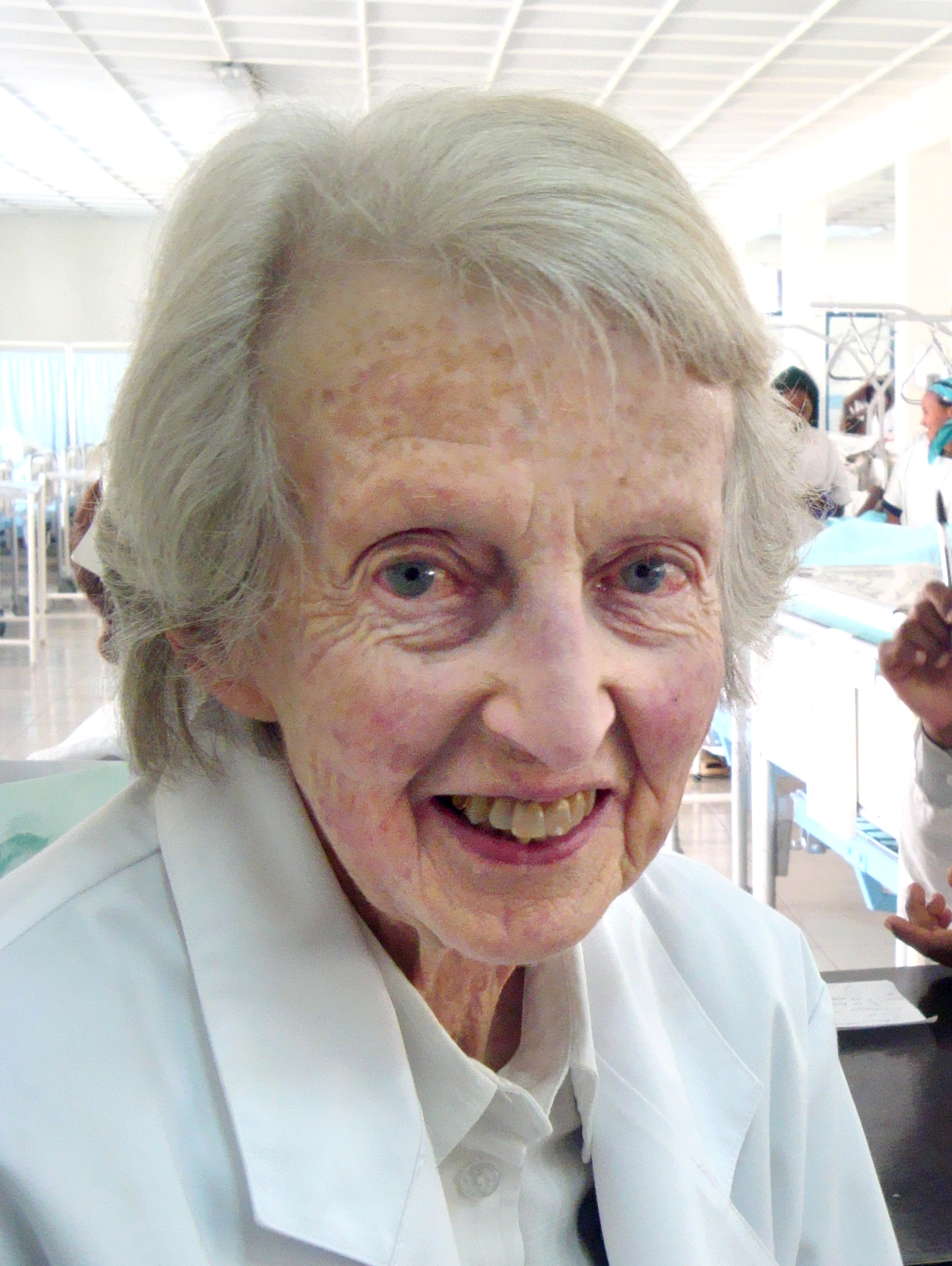
- Hamlin in 2009
- Born: Elinor Catherine Nicholson; 24 January 1924; Sydney, New South Wales, Australia
- Died: 18 March 2020 (aged 96); Addis Ababa, Ethiopia
- Occupation: Obstetrician
- Awards: Right Livelihood Award

Elinor Catherine Hamlin, AC, FRCS, FRANZCOG, FRCOG (née Nicholson; 24 January 1924 – 18 March 2020) was an Australian obstetrician and gynaecologist who, with her husband, New Zealander Reginald Hamlin, co-founded the Addis Ababa Fistula Hospital, the world's only medical centre dedicated exclusively to providing free obstetric fistula repair surgery to poor women with childbirth injuries. They also co-founded an associated non-profit organisation, Hamlin Fistula Ethiopia.

Hamlin was recognised by the United Nations agency UNFPA as a pioneer in fistula surgery for her development of techniques and procedures for obstetric fistula treatment. The Hamlins, together with the hospital staff, have treated more than 60,000 women to date for obstetric fistula. She died in Addis Ababa on 18 March 2020.

== Family and education ==
Elinor Catherine Nicholson was raised in the Sydney suburb of Ryde, at "The Hermitage". One of six children of Elinor and Theodore Nicholson, she went to Frensham School in Mittagong, before attending the University of Sydney and graduating from its medical school in 1946. After internships at St Joseph's Hospital, Auburn NSW, and St George's Hospital, Kogarah, she became a resident in obstetrics at Crown Street Women's Hospital.

In 1950, she married New Zealander Reginald Hamlin QSO OBE, a physician and medical superintendent at Crown Street.

== Addis Ababa Fistula Hospital ==
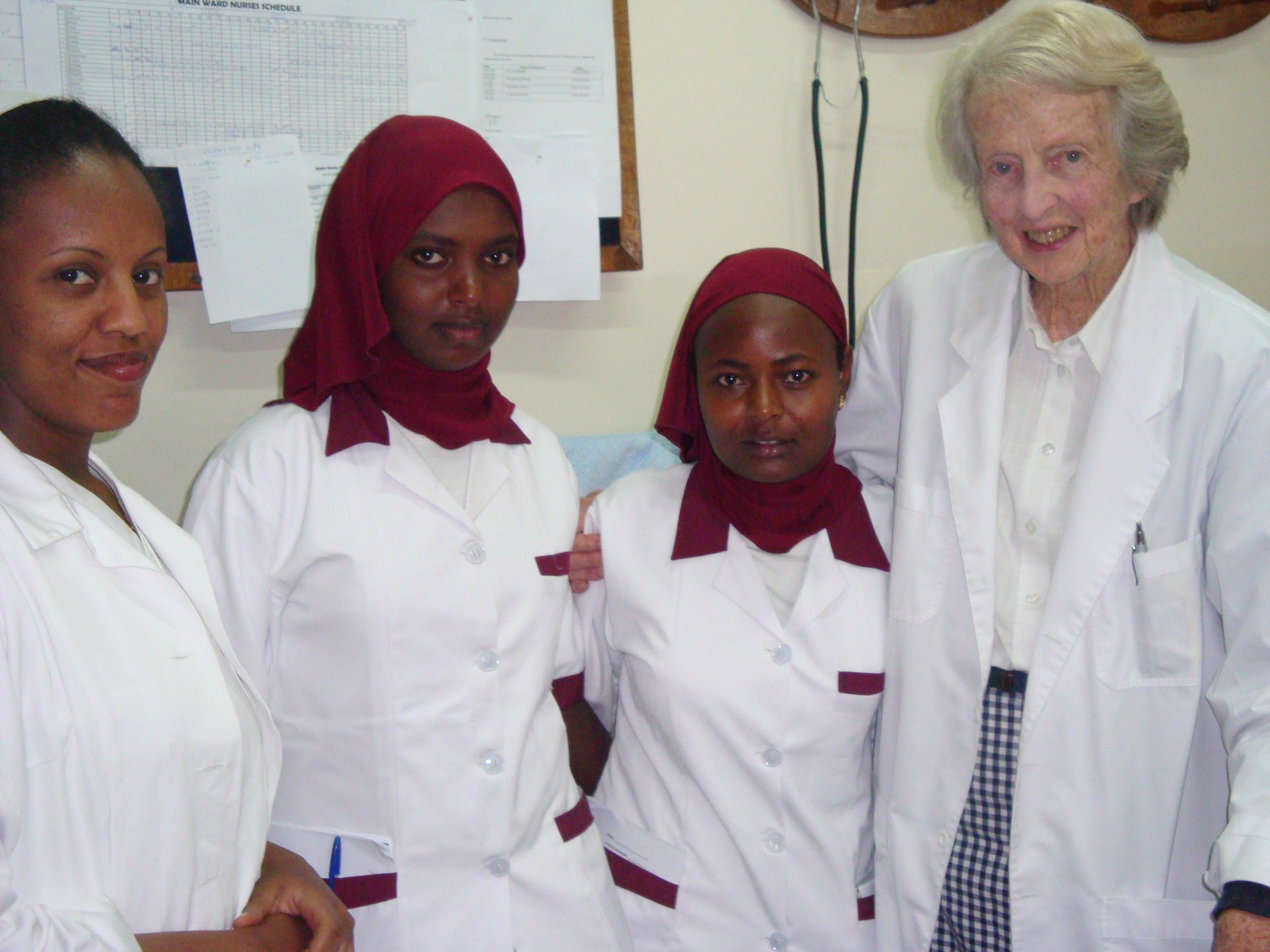
Three trainee midwives with Catherine Hamlin at the Hamlin Fistula Hospital in 2009

In 1958, the Hamlins replied to an advertisement placed by the Ethiopian government in The Lancet medical journal for an obstetrician and gynaecologist to establish a midwifery school at the Princess Tsehai Hospital in Addis Ababa, the hospital established by the emperor in honor of his daughter and grandchild who had died in childbirth. They arrived in 1959 with their six-year-old son, Richard. By 1959, obstetric fistulas had become an "academic rarity" in Australia and the United States. Seeing many cases arrive at the school, they decided to create a dedicated hospital. Fifteen years later, in 1974, they founded Addis Ababa Fistula Hospital which is the world's first modern fistula hospital.

Between 2003 and 2010, Catherine Hamlin established five additional fistula treatment facilities in remote parts of Ethiopia, due to the higher rates of fistula cases due to less access to prenatal and perinatal care. The five hospitals are located in Bahir Dar, Mekele, Yirgalem, Harar, and Mettu. The Addis Ababa Fistula Hospital and Hamlin Fistula Ethiopia's five regional hospitals have treated more than 60,000 patients.

Hamlin lived in her cottage on the grounds of the Addis Ababa Fistula Hospital and remained active in the day-to-day work of the hospital and patient care until her death in 2020. Reg Hamlin was actively involved in the activities of the hospital and was a member of its board of trustees until his death in 1993.

== Fistula prevention and rehabilitation programs ==
Hamlin's efforts to end fistula saw her lead a program of preventing obstetric fistulas through Ethiopia; she believed that midwifery was key to preventing fistulas from occurring in the first place. Hamlin argued that "to put a well trained midwife in every village would soon eradicate obstetric fistulae." In 2007 she founded the Hamlin College of Midwives. Hamlin Fistula Ethiopia recruits students from rural areas, provides a full four-year scholarship for students as they gain their Bachelor of Science (Midwifery) degree. Upon their graduation, students are deployed back to their communities where their skills are needed. As of November 2019, 170 midwives have graduated from the college; 92 are currently studying. Hamlin Fistula Ethiopia has partnered with the Ethiopian government to provide resources and midwives who have graduated from the Hamlin College of Midwives, to 80 government midwifery clinics across regional Ethiopia.

As part of the whole patient approach she advocated, Hamlin opened a rehabilitation and reintegration centre for fistula patients in 2002. Called Desta Mender (Amharic for 'Joy Village'), the facility was built on land donated by the Ethiopian government. The location of the site is approximately 10 kilometres from the Addis Ababa Fistula Hospital. Desta Mender has 10 houses to accommodate patients with chronic long-term injuries which require further care. Patients at the rehabilitation and reintegration centre undergo literacy and numeracy classes, counselling and vocational training.

== Recognition ==
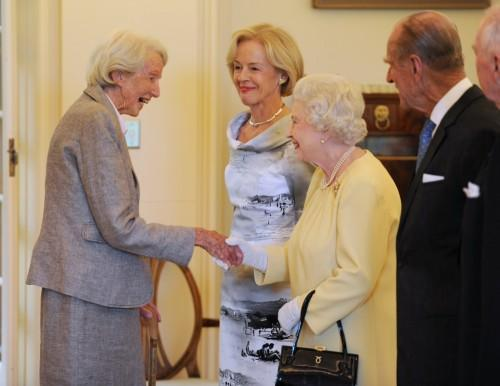
Hamlin meets Queen Elizabeth II at Government House, Canberra in 2011

Hamlin has been awarded honorary fellowships in the medical associations of Australia, England and the United States. On 26 January 1983, she was made a Member of the Order of Australia for her services to gynaecology in developing countries and on 26 January 1995, Hamlin was awarded Australia's highest honour, Companion of the Order of Australia.

On 1 January 2001, Hamlin was awarded the Centenary Medal by the Australian government for "long and outstanding service to international development in Africa". She is the author of the best-selling book, The Hospital by the River: A Story of Hope, first published in 2001. A second edition was published in 2016. Hamlin was described as a "modern-day Mother Teresa" in an editorial by Pulitzer Prize–winning writer Nicholas Kristof of The New York Times.

Hamlin appeared on Oprah Winfrey's television show in January 2004. The episode was included in Winfrey's 20-year anthology collection. Winfrey travelled to the hospital and filmed another episode for her show, broadcast in December 2005. The 2007 documentary, "A Walk to Beautiful" featured five Ethiopian women who were treated by Hamlin and her team at the Addis Ababa Fistula Hospital.

In 2009, Hamlin was awarded the Right Livelihood Award.

Hamlin was among 50 prominent Australians invited by the Governor-General of Australia, Dame Quentin Bryce, to take lunch with Queen Elizabeth II and the Duke of Edinburgh at Government House, Canberra on 23 October 2011.

In November 2016, a Sydney Ferries Emerald-class ferry was named Catherine Hamlin.

In 2019, Hamlin celebrated the 60th anniversary of her arrival in Ethiopia at a ceremony at the Addis Ababa Fistula Hospital. The Ethiopian Prime Minister, Abiy Ahmed, gave a speech recognising Hamlin's great impact on Ethiopia and presented her with the prestigious Eminent Citizen Award on behalf of the Government of Ethiopia. She is one of only three people ever to receive this accolade.

== Awards ==
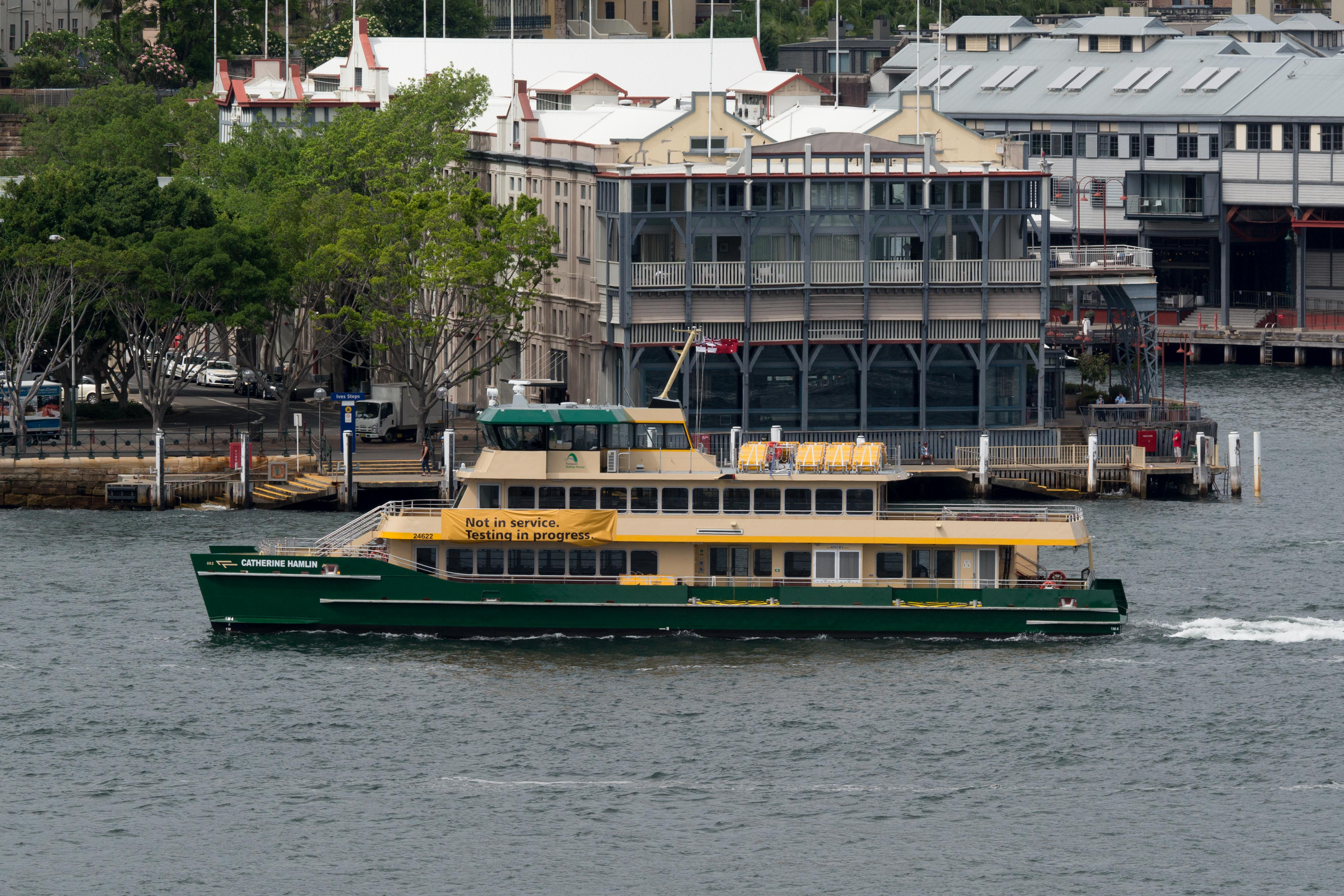
The Sydney ferry Catherine Hamlin

Both Hamlin and her hospital received numerous awards. Known for her dedication and humility, Hamlin said of the plaudits she received that "I'm doing what I love doing and it's not a hardship for me to be working in Ethiopia with these women".

- 1971 Haile Selassie Humanitarian Prize
- 1983 Member of the Order of Australia
- 1984 ANZAC Peace Prize
- 1987 Gold Medal of Merit, Order of St. Gregory the Great
- 1989 Honorary Gold Medal, Royal College of Surgeons
- 1995 Companion of the Order of Australia
- 1996 Zonta International Award, International Honorary Member
- 1998 Rotary Award for World Understanding and Peace, Rotary International
- 1999 Nominee, Nobel Peace Prize
- 2001 Centenary Medal, Order of Australia
- 2003 Honorary Fellow, American College of Surgeons
- 2004 National Living Treasure of Australia, National Trust of Australia
- 2005 Honorary Fellow, Royal College of Surgeons of Edinburgh
- 2005 Doctor of Medicine Honoris Causa, University of Sydney
- 2006 Doctorate of Law Honoris Causa, Dundee University
- 2009 Gold Medal, World Association for Sexual Health
- 2009 Right Livelihood Award, Stockholm, Sweden
- 2010 Honorary Doctorate, Addis Ababa University, Ethiopia
- 2011 Farquharson Award, Royal College of Surgeons of Edinburgh
- 2012 Honorary Ethiopian Citizenship, Prime Minister Meles Zenawi
- 2014 Distinguished Surgeon of the Year, Society of Gynecological Surgeons, USA
- 2014 Nominee, Nobel Peace Prize
- 2017 United Nations Association of Australia Lifework Award 2017
- 2017 Winner of "Bego Sew" yearly Ethiopian Prize for the lifetime best achievements of foreigners who devote their lives to the well-being of fellow Ethiopians
- 2018 NSW Senior Australian of the Year
- 2019 Eminent Citizen Award, Prime Minister Abiy Ahmed

== Relevant literature ==
=== Books ===
- The Hospital By the River (Hamlin and Little, 2016)
- Catherine's Gift (Little, 2010)

=== Obituaries ===
- Catherine Hamlin, 96, Dies; Pioneering Doctor Treated Childbirth Injury. The New York Times 19 March 2020.
- Catherine Hamlin, OB/GYN who healed injured and ostracized mothers, dies at 96. The Washington Post 23 March 2020.
- Catherine Hamlin, 'Saint of Addis Ababa', dies at 96. The Sydney Morning Herald March 19, 2020.
- Catherine Hamlin Obituary. The Guardian 14 April 2020.
- Catherine Hamlin: Grief in Ethiopia as trailblazing Australian doctor dies. BBC 19 March 2020.
- Healing Hands - Catherine Hamlin Died on March 18. The Economist 8 April 2020.
- Catherine Hamlin Obituary. The Lancet 25 April 2020.
