= World Journal of Surgery =

- Discipline: Surgery
- Language: English
- Edited by: John G. Hunter

Publication details
- History: 1977-present
- Publisher: Springer Science+Business Media
- Frequency: 9/year
- Impact factor: 2.642 (2014)

Standard abbreviations
- ISO 4: World J. Surg.

Indexing
- CODEN: WJSUDI
- ISSN: 0364-2313 (print); 1432-2323 (web)
- OCLC no.: 2991729

Links
- Journal homepage; Online archive

The World Journal of Surgery is a peer-reviewed medical journal covering research in the field of surgery. It was established in 1977 and is published by Springer Science+Business Media on behalf of the International Society of Surgery, of which it is the official journal. Since July 2004, the editor-in-chief has been John G. Hunter (Oregon Health & Science University). According to the Journal Citation Reports, the journal has a 2014 impact factor of 2.642.
