= Vesicovaginal fistula =

Female urogenital fissure

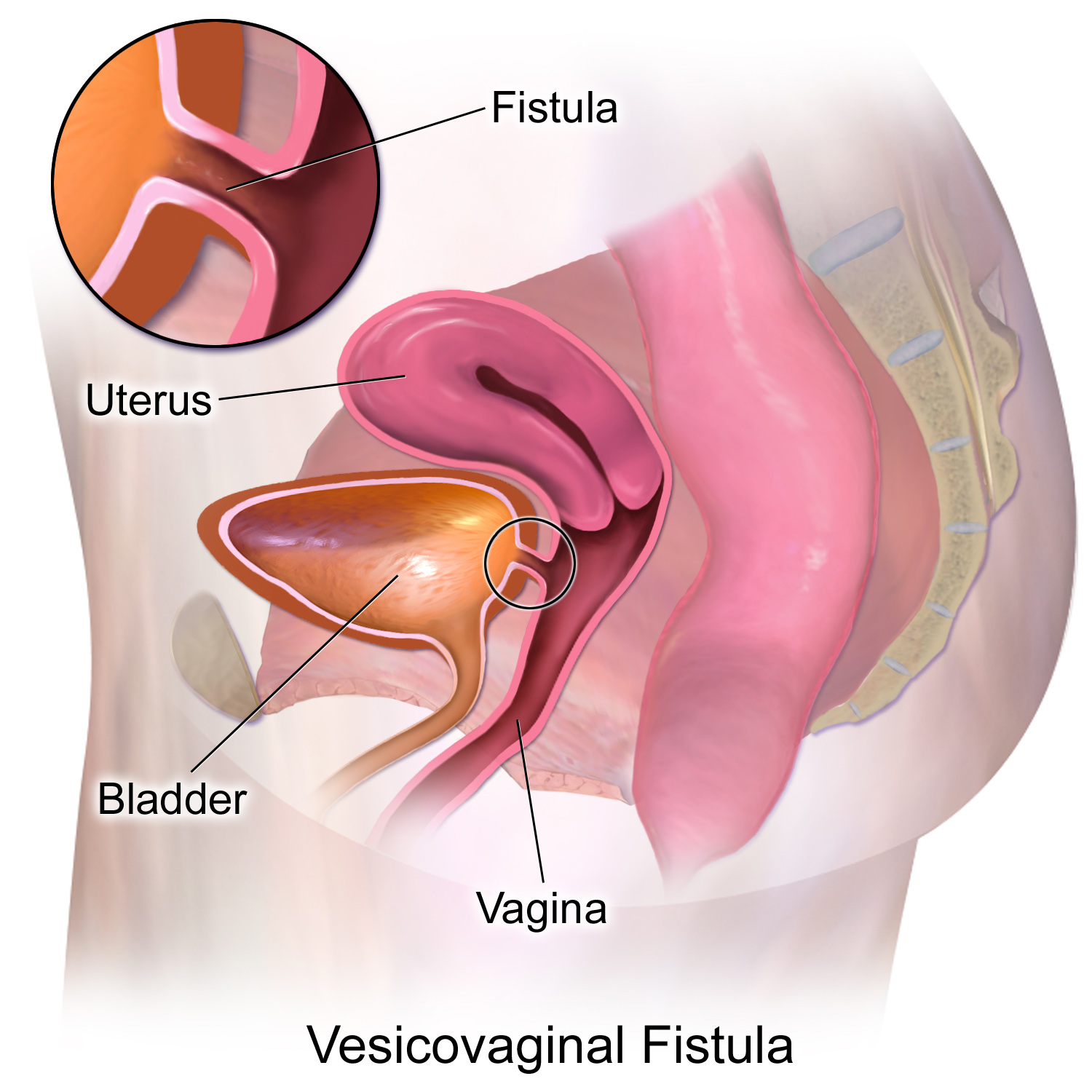
- Specialty: Gynaecology

Vesicovaginal fistula (VVF) is a subtype of female urogenital fistula.

== Signs and symptoms ==
Vesicovaginal fistula, or VVF, is an abnormal fistulous tract extending between the bladder (vesica) and the vagina that allows the continuous involuntary discharge of urine into the vaginal vault.

In addition to the medical sequela from these fistulas, they often have a profound effect on the patient's emotional well-being.

== Causes ==
It may be the result of a congenital birth condition such as VACTERL association. It is often caused by childbirth (in which case it is known as an obstetric fistula), when a prolonged labor presses the unborn child tightly against the pelvis, cutting off blood flow to the vesicovaginal wall. The affected tissue may necrotize (die), leaving a hole.

Vaginal fistulas can also result from particularly violent cases of rape, especially those involving multiple rapists and/or foreign objects. Some health centers in countries such as the Democratic Republic of Congo have begun specializing in the surgical repair of vaginal fistulas. It can also be associated with hysterectomy, cancer operations, radiation therapy and cone biopsy.

== Treatment ==
Vesicovaginal fistulae are typically repaired either transvaginally or laparoscopically, although patients who have had multiple transvaginal procedures sometimes attempt a final repair through a large abdominal incision, or laparotomy.

The laparoscopic (minimally invasive) approach to VVF repair has become more prevalent due to greater visualization, higher success rate, and lower complication rates.

=== Possible complications of surgical treatment ===
- Recurrent formation of the fistula
- Injury to the ureter, bowel, or intestines
- Vaginal shortening

== History ==
Before the 19th century, women who suffered from VVF were judged harshly and rejected by society. Throughout the 19th century, treatment for VVF was limited because the practice of gynecology was perceived as taboo. Doctors were almost entirely male at this time, and looking at a nude female, even for medical purposes, was seen as divergent from 19th-century values.

One of the most famous gynecological surgeons of this time was Dr. J. Marion Sims, who developed a successful technique for treating VVF in the mid-1800s, for which he is hailed as a pioneer of gynecology. But Sims was not the first American to perform successful VVF surgery, being preceded by John Peter Mettauer of Virginia in 1838 and George Hayward of Boston in 1839.

Black enslaved women in the American South were particularly prone to VVF because they were denied proper nutrients and medical care. Sims performed on these women without anesthesia, which had not been introduced until after he started his experiments, and which in its infancy Sims hesitated to use. (Ether anesthesia was publicly demonstrated in Boston in 1846, a year after Sims began his experimentation.) Sims did not have a white female patient until he made ether available to them. He publicly noted that he never resorted to using anesthetics because he believed that the pain did not justify the risks. A detailed case study of Sims even discusses the case of a black woman who underwent three operations, all without anesthesia. It was considered acceptable to operate on them without anesthetic because, Sims claimed, African-American women have a naturally higher pain tolerance.

The healing process of the VVF procedure remains arduous. To have a successful recovery from the surgery, it must be successful on the first attempt. Sims's operations on African-American enslaved women showcase the dangerous nature of the procedure. There still have not been clear instructions on how to properly recover from the procedure other than taking prescribed antibiotics.

== See also ==
- Colposcopy
- Double dye test
- Rectovaginal fistula
- Urinary incontinence
