= Addis Ababa Fistula Hospital =

Obstetric hospital in Addis Ababa, Ethiopia

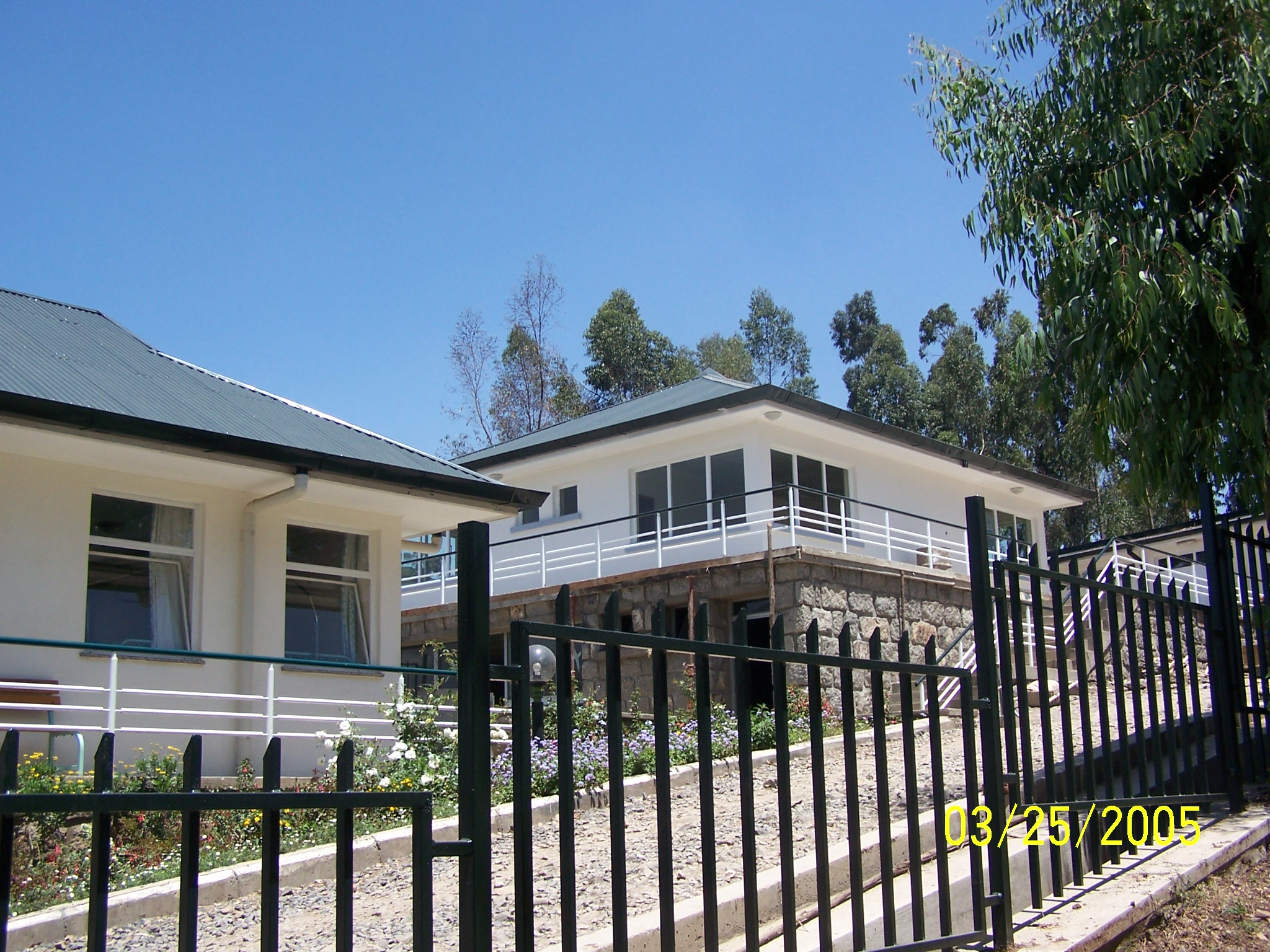

Geography
- Location: Addis Ababa, Ethiopia
- Coordinates: 9°01′30″N 38°45′16″E

Services
- Emergency department: Yes

History
- Founded: 1974.

Links
- Website: www.hamlinfistula.org

Addis Ababa Fistula Hospital, also known as AAFH and Hamlin's Addis Ababa Fistula Hospital, is a women's health care hospital based in Addis Ababa, Ethiopia. The hospital was founded by Australian physicians Catherine Hamlin and Reginald Hamlin, to care for women with childbirth injuries. It is the only hospital of its kind dedicated exclusively to treating women with obstetric fistula, a condition with severe social stigma and physical consequences. All patients are treated free of charge.

Patients undergo surgical repair by surgeons trained at the hospital's main facility in Addis Ababa. Around 93% of patients are successfully treated.

== Societal context ==
Ethiopia lacks access to health care and pregnancy care. According to a 2007 article, it was estimated that Ethiopia had 2,000 maternal deaths per 100,000 live births, in comparison to the United States, where there were eight maternal deaths per 100,000 live births. There was one doctor for every 36,000 people, and many newly graduated doctors leave the country to work abroad. Rural areas had no doctors or midwives.

Obstetric fistulae are nearly extinct in the developed world due to access to better nutrition, health care, and the Caesarean section. However, they remain pervasive in countries like Ethiopia where extreme poverty is pervasive and medical care is inaccessible.

According to a 2007 article, there were 30,000 women with untreated vesicovaginal fistula. An estimated 9,000 women develop it each year. Women with fistulae face social rejection from their family and society due to urinary or fecal incontinence; 50% face separation or divorce from husbands. About 30% of women develop foot drop. Women can suffer poverty, malnutrition, and suicide.

== History and founding ==
In 1959, Catherine and Reginald Hamlin moved to Addis Ababa to train midwives at the Princess Tsehai Memorial Hospital, founded by Emperor Haile Selassie in honor of his daughter, who died in childbirth. While there, the Hamlins encountered obstetric fistula for the first time. Without prior experience, the Hamlins developed a surgical treatment, which quickly became in demand. With Haile Selassie's permission, the Hamlins raised money to build Addis Ababa Fistula Hospital, which opened in 1974 or 1975. The Addis Ababa Fistula Hospital is the world's second fistula hospital, after the now-closed Woman's Hospital of New York.

In 1999, doctors at the hospital submitted a report on treatment of 91 girls and women aged 6-21 who suffered from total fecal incontinence from injuries during sexual intercourse, including rape. All women who received the treatment were cured.

The 2007 documentary A Walk to Beautiful follows five women before and after treatment at Addis Ababa Fistula Hospital.

In 2007, the hospital had 140 beds and treated about 1,500 patients per year. In 2017, the hospital had a capacity of 1,200 to 2,500 fistula patients per year.

A 2017 journal report found that 58% of fistula patients had a urinary tract infection.

== Development ==
In 1998, the hospital was extensively refurbished and enlarged. As of 2018, it can accommodate up to 140 patients and four operations can be performed simultaneously in the theatre. Five regional fistula centres have been established in the towns of Bahir Dar, Mekelle, Harar, Yirgalem, and Metu. The Hamlin Fistula hospitals are staffed by over 550 Ethiopians. All 6 hospitals provide a safe birthing facility where former patients who become pregnant again can have a caesarian section. The regional Hamlin Fistula centres provide care for women who suffer from incontinence, physical impairment, shame and marginalisation as a result of an obstetric fistula.

The Hamlin College of Midwives was established in 2006 to ensure that there is a skilled birth attendant available to provide maternal health care (pre-, intro- and post-natal). The college follows the curriculum of the International Confederation of Midwives, including the precondition that students conduct at least 40 deliveries before they graduate. The midwifery college is on land adjacent to Desta Mender ("Village of Joy"), where women with long-term injuries caused by obstructed labour reside, about 17 km from Addis Ababa. The first students graduated in 2011 and, as of 2018, 125 midwives have graduated with a Bachelor of Science degree in Midwifery. All have committed to working as a Hamlin midwife for a minimum of 4 years. The midwives are being deployed in pairs near medical centres. In 2017, Hamlin-trained midwives delivered over 22,500 babies and no cases of fistula occurred in these births.

The Addis Ababa hospital has trained 28 surgeons in fistula repair between 2015 and 2018. Hamlin says that they have "now treated 55,000 [women] and these are like ambassadors all over the countryside". In 2008, when the fourth clinic was opened Hamlin travelled the world to raise awareness of the effect of the condition on women in Ethiopia.

The hospitals aim to cure 4000 women annually, but Hamlin cited the World Health Organisation's estimate that there are 6000-7000 cases a year in Ethiopia alone.

Due to the development of the five regional Hamlin Fistula Centers, some of the women who suffer the long-term effects of obstetric fistula are able to move back to their homes and receive ongoing medical care. Additionally, some women have established small businesses that have enabled them to move out of Desta Mender to nearby towns and return to receive medical care or visit friends.

Hamlin Fistula Ethiopia’s governance and team is 100% Ethiopian with almost 600 Ethiopian professionals – many of whom were trained by Catherine – working across the organisation to deliver the Hamlin Model of Care for women with fistula injuries.

The network of Hamlin Fistula Hospitals and the midwifery college are supported largely by private donors in Australia, the UK and the United States. The largest of the dedicated support organisations is the Fistula Foundation, located in San Jose, California. Money is also provided by World Vision, the Catherine Hamlin Fistula Foundation, England-based Ethiopiaid and funds paid into an endowment by the Australian Government.

== The Oprah Winfrey Show ==
In January 2004, Catherine Hamlin appeared on The Oprah Winfrey Show to discuss the 50 years of free reconstructive surgery that she has been providing to over 25,000 patients. After Hamlin's visit to the show, thousands of viewers were compelled to act due to her sheer selflessness. The Fistula Foundation, which supports Dr. Hamlin's hospital, received more than $3 million in donations. Oprah Winfrey was so impressed by Hamlin's actions that she visited the hospital in Ethiopia to tape the second episode in December 2005. The funding received by the hospital following this exposure led to the building a brand new facility with classrooms, examination rooms, housing for residents who travel to the hospital for treatment and a small apartment for the on-call doctors for Desta Mender.

== See also ==
- Terrewode Women’s Community Hospital, Uganda
