= Ureterovaginal fistula =

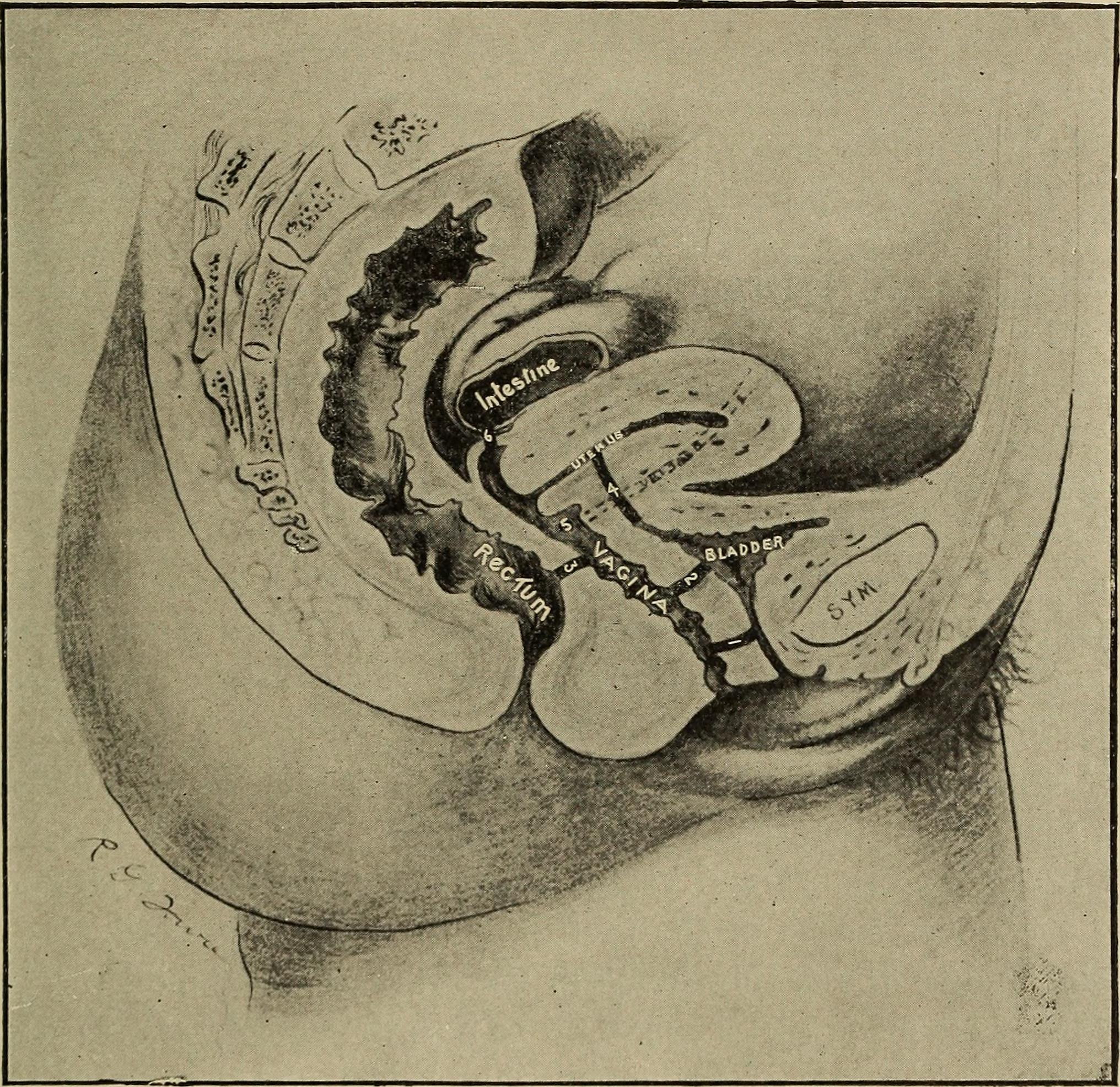
- The diagnosis of ureterovaginal fistula has been known for some time (this illustration is from 1910) the location of the UV fistula is identified by the number five.
- Specialty: Gynecology, Urology

A ureterovaginal fistula is an abnormal passageway existing between the ureter and the vagina. It presents as urinary incontinence. Its impact on women is to reduce the "quality of life dramatically."

== Cause ==
A ureterovaginal fistula is a result of trauma, infection, pelvic surgery, radiation treatment and therapy, malignancy, or inflammatory bowel disease. Symptoms can be troubling for women especially since some clinicians delay treatment until inflammation is reduced and stronger tissue has formed. The fistula may develop as a maternal birth injury from a long and protracted labor, long dilation time and expulsion period. Difficult deliveries can create pressure necrosis in the tissue that is being pushed between the head of the infant and the softer tissues of the vagina, ureters, and bladder.

Radiographic imaging can assist clinicians in identifying the abnormality. A Ureterovaginal fistula is always indicative of an obstructed kidney necessitating emergency intervention followed later by an elective surgical repair of the fistula.

[UN member states will engage in] Educating individual women and men, girls and boys, communities, policymakers and health professionals about how obstetric fistula can be prevented and treated, and increasing awareness of the needs of pregnant women and girls, as well as of those who have undergone surgical fistula repair, including their right to the highest attainable standard of mental and physical health, including sexual and reproductive health, by working with community and religious leaders, traditional birth attendants and midwives, including women and girls who have suffered from fistula, the media, social workers, civil society, women’s organizations, influential public figures and policymakers...

== Treatment ==
Many women delay treatment for decades. Surgeons often will correct the fistula through major gynecological surgery. Newer treatments can include the placement of a stent and is usually successful. In 0.5-2.5% of major pelvic surgeries a ureterovaginal fistula will form, usually weeks later. If the fistula cannot be repaired, the clinician may create a permanent diversion of urine or urostomy. Risks associated with the repair of the fistula are also associated with most other surgical procedures and include the risk of adhesions, disorders of wound healing, infection, ileus, and immobilization. There is a recurrence rate of 5%–15% in the surgical operation done to correct the fistula.

== Epidemiology ==
Birth injuries that result in the formation of fistulas and urinary and fecal incontinence have been found to be strongly associated with economic and cultural factors. Teenagers and women who sustain injuries that develop into ureterovaginal fistulas during childbirth suffer significant social stigma. Ureterovaginal fistulas related to prolonged, obstructed labor are rare in developed nations but are more common in countries where access to emergent obstetrical care is limited.

== Bibliography ==
- Abele, H (2014). Atlas of gynecologic surgery. Stuttgart: Thieme. ISBN 978-3-13-650704-9.
