= Obstetric fistula =

Medical condition

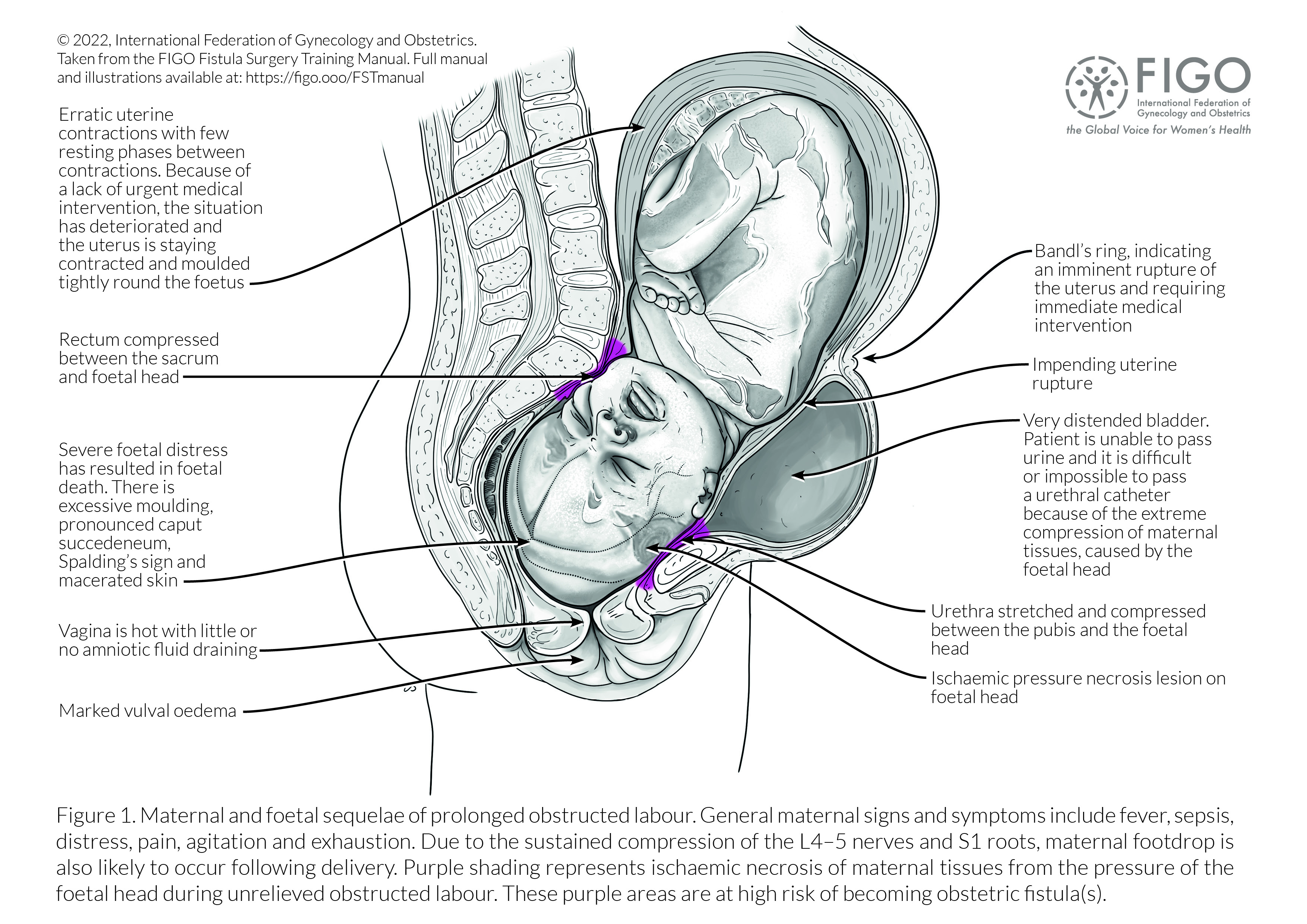
- Diagram of maternal and foetal sequelae of prolonged obstructed labour, highlighting areas that are at high risk of developing obstetric fistula(s).
- Specialty: Urology, gynecology
- Symptoms: Incontinence of urine or feces
- Complications: Depression, infertility, social isolation
- Usual onset: Childbirth
- Risk factors: Obstructed labor, poor access to medical care, malnutrition, teenage pregnancy
- Diagnostic method: Based on symptoms, supported methylene blue
- Prevention: Appropriate use of cesarean section
- Treatment: Surgery, urinary catheter, counseling
- Frequency: 2 million (developing world), rare (developed world)

Obstetric fistula is a medical condition in which a hole develops in the birth canal as a result of childbirth. This can be between the vagina and rectum, ureter, or bladder. It can result in incontinence of urine or feces. Complications may include depression, infertility, and social isolation.

Risk factors include obstructed labor, poor access to medical care, malnutrition, and teenage pregnancy. The underlying mechanism is poor blood flow to the affected area for a prolonged period of time. Diagnosis is generally based on symptoms and may be supported by the use of methylene blue.

Obstetric fistulae are almost entirely preventable with appropriate use of cesarean section. Treatment is typically by surgery. If treated early, the use of a urinary catheter may help with healing. Counseling may also be useful. An estimated 2 million people in sub-Saharan Africa, Asia, the Arab region, and Latin America have the condition, with about 75,000 new cases developing a year. It occurs very rarely in the developed world and is considered a disease of poverty.

== Signs and symptoms ==
Symptoms of obstetric fistula include:

- Flatulence, urinary incontinence, or fecal incontinence, which may be continual or only happen at night
- Foul-smelling vaginal discharge
- Repeated vaginal or urinary tract infections
- Irritation or pain in the vagina or surrounding areas
- Pain during sexual activity

Other effects of obstetric fistulae include stillborn babies due to prolonged labor, which happens 85% to 100% of the time, severe ulcerations of the vaginal tract, "foot drop", which is the paralysis of the lower limbs caused by nerve damage, making it impossible to walk, infection of the fistula forming an abscess, and up to two-thirds of sufferers become amenorrhoeic.

Obstetric fistulae have far-reaching physical, social, economic, and psychological consequences for the women affected. According to UNFPA, "Due to the prolonged obstructed labour, the baby almost inevitably dies, and the parent is left with chronic incontinence. Unable to control the flow of urine or faeces, or both, they may be abandoned by their spouse and family and ostracized by their community. Without treatment, their prospects for work and family life are virtually nonexistent."

=== Physical ===
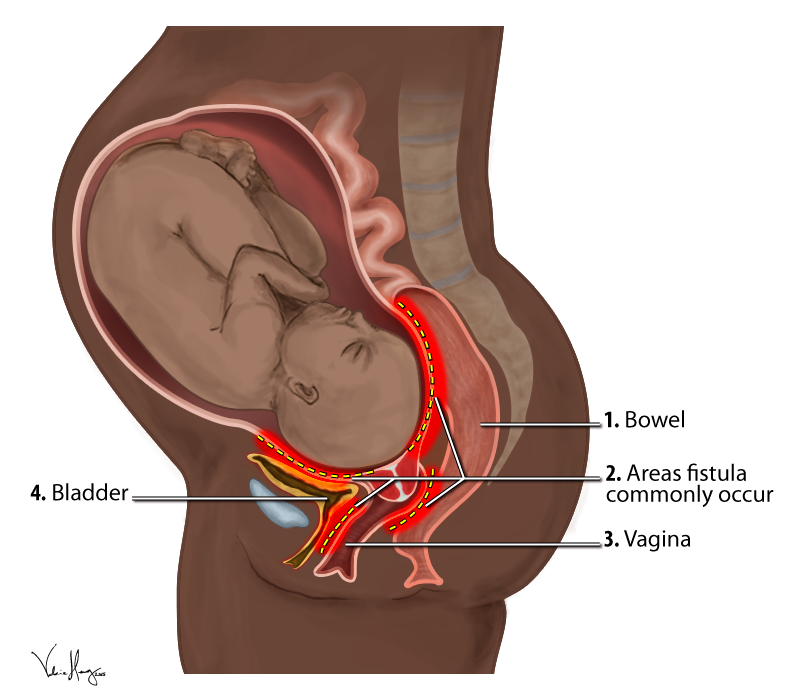
The physical symptoms depend upon the location of the fistula.

The most direct consequence of an obstetric fistula is the constant leakage of urine, feces, and blood as a result of a hole that forms between the vagina and bladder or rectum. This leaking has both physical and societal penalties. The acid in the urine, feces, and blood causes burn wounds on the legs from the continuous dripping. Nerve damage that can result from the leaking can cause women to struggle with walking and eventually lose mobility. In an attempt to avoid the dripping, women limit their intake of water and liquid, which can ultimately lead to dangerous cases of dehydration. Ulceration and infections can persist, as well as kidney disease and kidney failure, which can each lead to death. Further, only a quarter of women who develop a fistula in their first birth can have a living baby, and therefore have minuscule chances of conceiving a healthy baby later on. Some, due to obstetric fistulae and other complications from childbirth, do not survive.

=== Social ===
Physical consequences of obstetric fistulae lead to severe sociocultural stigmatization for various reasons. For example, in Burkina Faso, most citizens do not view an obstetric fistula as a medical condition, but as a divine punishment or a curse for disloyal or disrespectful behavior. Other sub-Saharan cultures view offspring as an indicator of a family's wealth. A woman who is unable to successfully produce children as assets for her family is believed to make her and her family socially and economically inferior. A patient's incontinence and pain can also render her unable to perform household chores and childrearing as a wife and as a mother, thus devaluing her. Other misconceptions about obstetric fistulae are that they are caused by venereal diseases or are divine punishment for sexual misconduct.

As a result, many girls are divorced or abandoned by their husbands and partners, disowned by their families, ridiculed by friends, and even isolated by health workers. Divorce rates for women who have an obstetric fistula range from 50% to as high as 89%. Now marginalized members of society, girls are forced to live on the edges of their villages and towns, often in isolation in a hut where they will likely die from starvation or an infection in the birth canal. The unavoidable odor is considered offensive, and its removal from society is seen as essential. Accounts of women who develop obstetric fistulae proclaim that their lives have been reduced to the leaking of urine, feces, and blood because they are no longer capable or allowed to participate in traditional activities, including the duties of wife and mother. Because such consequences highly stigmatize and marginalize the woman, the intense loneliness and shame can lead to clinical depression and suicidal thoughts. Some women have formed small groups and resorted to walking to seek medical help, where their characteristic odor makes them a target for sub-Saharan predatory wildlife, further endangering their lives. This trip can take 12 hours to complete. Moreover, women are sometimes forced to turn to commercial sex work as a means of survival because the extreme poverty and social isolation that result from obstetric fistulae eliminate all other income opportunities. With only 7.5% of women with fistulae able to access treatment, the vast majority of women end up with the consequences of obstructed and prolonged labor simply because options and access to help is so limited.

=== Psychological ===
Some common psychological consequences that women with a fistula face are the despair from losing their child, the humiliation from their smell, and the inability to perform their family roles. Additionally, a fear of developing another fistula in future pregnancies exists.

Obstetric fistula is not only debilitating physically, but also emotionally. A woman is presented with an array of psychological trauma that she must oftentimes deal with herself unless provided with ample resources. Oftentimes ostracized by her community, a woman with an obstetric fistula tends to face these issues on her own. In a study of The lived experience of Malawian women with obstetric fistula, the immense psychological trauma is addressed: "For these women, internalizing this constant struggle leads to psychological morbidity." It was striking how many women discussed constant sadness and giving up hope in their interviews."

Although the psychological impacts center around the woman experiencing the fistula, others around them, and especially loved ones, feel the impact as well. The same study references this: "This attitude was often shared by their family members, both husbands and female relatives."

Women with obstetric fistula face severe mental health issues. Among women with obstetric fistula from Bangladesh and Ethiopia, 97% screened positive for potential mental health dysfunctions, and about 30% had major depression.

== Risk factors ==
In less-developed countries, obstetric fistulae usually develop as a result of prolonged labor when a caesarean section cannot be obtained. Over the course of the three to five days of labor, the unborn child presses against the mother's vagina very tightly, cutting off blood flow to the surrounding tissues between the vagina and the rectum and between the vagina and the bladder, causing the tissues to disintegrate and rot away.

Obstetric fistulae can also be caused by poorly performed abortions, and pelvic fracture, cancer, or radiation therapy targeted at the pelvic area, inflammatory bowel disease (such as Crohn's disease and ulcerative colitis). Other potential causes for the development of obstetric fistulae are sexual abuse and rape, especially in conflict/postconflict areas, and other trauma, such as surgical trauma.

In the developed world, such as the US, the primary cause of obstetric fistulae, particularly rectovaginal fistulae, is the use of episiotomy and forceps. Primary risk factors include early or closely spaced pregnancies and lack of access to emergency obstetric care. For example, a 1983 study in Nigeria found that 54.8% of the women affected were under 20 years of age, and 64.4% gave birth at home or in poorly equipped local clinics. When available at all, cesarean sections and other medical interventions are usually not performed until after tissue damage has already been done.

Social, political, and economic causes that indirectly lead to the development of obstetric fistulae concern issues of poverty, malnutrition, lack of education, early marriage and childbirth, the role and status of women in developing countries, harmful traditional practices, sexual violence, and lack of good quality or accessible maternal and health care.

=== Poverty ===
Poverty is the main indirect cause of obstetric fistulae around the world. As obstructed labor and obstetric fistulae account for 8% of maternal deaths worldwide and "a 60-fold difference in gross national product per person shows up as a 120-fold difference in maternal mortality ratio," impoverished countries produce higher maternal mortality rates and thus higher obstetric fistula rates. Furthermore, impoverished countries not only have low incomes, but also lack adequate infrastructure, trained and educated professionals, resources, and a centralized government that exist in developed nations to eradicate obstetric fistulae effectively.

According to UNFPA, "Generally accepted estimates suggest that 2.0-3.5 million women live with obstetric fistulae in the developing world, and between 50,000 and 100,000 new cases develop each year. All but eliminated from the developed world, obstetric fistula continues to affect the poorest of the poor: women and girls living in some of the most resource-starved remote regions in the world."

=== Malnutrition ===
One reason that poverty produces such high rates of fistula cases is the malnutrition that exists in such areas. Lack of money and access to proper nutrition, as well as vulnerability to diseases that exist in impoverished areas because of limited basic health care and disease prevention methods, cause inhabitants of these regions to experience stunted growth. Sub-Saharan Africa is one such environment where the shortest women have, on average, lighter babies and more difficulties during birth when compared with full-grown women. This stunted growth causes expectant mothers to have skeletons unequipped for proper birth, such as an underdeveloped pelvis. This weak and underdeveloped bone structure increases the chances that the baby will get stuck in the pelvis during birth, cutting off circulation and leading to tissue necrosis. Because of the correlation between malnutrition, stunted growth, and birthing difficulties, maternal height can at times be used as a measure for expected labor difficulties.

=== Lack of education ===
High levels of poverty also lead to low levels of education among impoverished women concerning maternal health. This lack of information, in combination with obstacles preventing rural women from easily traveling to and from hospitals, leads many to arrive at the birthing process without prenatal care. This can cause the development of unplanned complications that may arise during home births, in which traditional techniques are used. These techniques often fail in the event of unplanned emergencies, leading women to go to the hospital for care too late, desperately ill, and therefore vulnerable to the risks of anesthesia and surgery that must be used on them. In a study of women who had prenatal care and those who had unbooked emergency births, "the death rate in the booked-healthy group was as good as that in many developed countries, [but] the death rate in the unbooked emergencies was the same as the death rate in England in the 16th and 17th centuries." In this study, 62 unbooked emergency women were diagnosed with obstetric fistulae out of 7,707 studied, in comparison to three diagnosed booked mothers out of 15,020 studied. In addition, studies find that education is associated with lower desired family size, greater use of contraceptives, and increased use of professional medical services. Educated families are also more likely to be able to afford health care, especially maternal healthcare.

=== Early childbirth ===
In sub-Saharan Africa, many girls enter into arranged marriages soon after menarche (usually between the ages of 9 and 15). Social factors and economic factors contribute to this practice of early marriages. Socially, some grooms want to ensure their brides are virgins when they get married, so an earlier marriage is desirable. Economically, the bride price received and having one less person to feed in the family helps alleviate the financial burdens of the bride's family. Early marriages lead to early childbirth, which increases the risk of obstructed labor, since young mothers who are poor and malnourished may have underdeveloped pelvises. In fact, obstructed labor is responsible for 76 to 97% of obstetric fistulae.

=== Lack of healthcare ===
Even women who do make it to the hospital may not get proper treatment. Countries that suffer from poverty, civil and political unrest or conflict, and other dangerous public health issues such as malaria, HIV/AIDS, and tuberculosis often suffer from a severe burden and breakdown within the healthcare system. This breakdown puts many people at risk, specifically women. Many hospitals within these conditions have shortages of staff, supplies, and other forms of medical technology that would be necessary to perform reconstructive obstetric fistula repair. There is a shortage of doctors in rural Africa. Studies find that the doctors and nurses who do exist in rural Africa often do not show up for work.

Poverty hinders women from being able to access normal and emergency obstetric care because of long distances and expensive procedures. For some women, the closest maternal care facility can be more than 50 km away. In Kenya, a study by the Ministry of Health found that the "rugged landscape, long distances to health facilities, and societal preferences for delivery with a traditional birth attendant contributed to delays in accessing necessary obstetric care." Emergency cesarean sections, which can help avoid fistulae caused by prolonged vaginal deliveries, are very expensive.

=== Status of women ===
In developing countries, women who are affected by obstetric fistulae do not necessarily have full agency over their bodies or their households. Rather, their husbands and other family members have control in determining the healthcare that the women receive. For example, a woman's family may refuse medical examinations for the patient by male doctors, but female doctors may be unavailable, thus barring women from prenatal care. Furthermore, many societies believe that women are supposed to suffer in childbirth, and thus are less inclined to support maternal health efforts.

== Prevention ==
Prevention is the key to ending fistulae. UNFPA states that, "Ensuring skilled birth attendance at all births and providing emergency obstetric care for all women who develop complications during delivery would make fistula as rare in developing countries as it is in the industrialized world." In addition, access to health services and education – including family planning, gender equality, higher living standards, child marriage, and human rights – must be addressed to reduce the marginalization of women and girls. Reducing marginalization in these areas could reduce maternal disability and death by at least 20%.

Prevention comes in the form of access to obstetrical care, support from trained health care professionals throughout pregnancy, providing access to family planning, promoting spacing between births, supporting women's education, and postponing early marriage. Fistula prevention also involves many strategies to educate local communities about the cultural, social, and physiological factors that contribute to the risk of fistulae. One of these strategies involves organizing community-level awareness campaigns to educate women about prevention methods such as proper hygiene and care during pregnancy and labor. Prevention of prolonged obstructed labor and fistulae should preferably begin as early as possible in each woman's life. For example, improved nutrition and outreach programs to raise awareness of children's nutritional needs to prevent malnutrition, as well as improve the physical maturity of young mothers, are important fistula prevention strategies. It is also important to ensure access to timely and safe delivery during childbirth: measures include the availability and provision of emergency obstetric care, as well as quick and safe cesarean sections for women in obstructed labor. Some organizations train local nurses and midwives to perform emergency cesarean sections to avoid vaginal delivery for young mothers who have underdeveloped pelvises. Midwives located in the local communities where obstetric fistulae are prevalent can promote health practices that help prevent future development of obstetric fistulae. NGOs also work with local governments, like the government of Niger, to offer free cesarean sections, further preventing the onset of obstetric fistulae.

Promoting education for girls is also a key factor in preventing fistulae in the long term. Former fistula patients often serve as "community fistula advocates" or "ambassadors of hope", a UNFPA-sponsored initiative, to educate the community. These survivors help current patients, educate pregnant mothers, and dispel cultural myths that obstetric fistulae are caused by adultery or evil spirits. Successful ambassador programs are in place in Kenya, Bangladesh, Nigeria, Ghana, Côte d'Ivoire, and Liberia.

Several organizations have developed effective fistula prevention strategies. One, the Tanzanian Midwives Association, works to prevent fistulae by improving healthcare for women, encouraging the delay of early marriage and childbearing, and helping the local communities to advocate for women's rights.

== Treatment ==
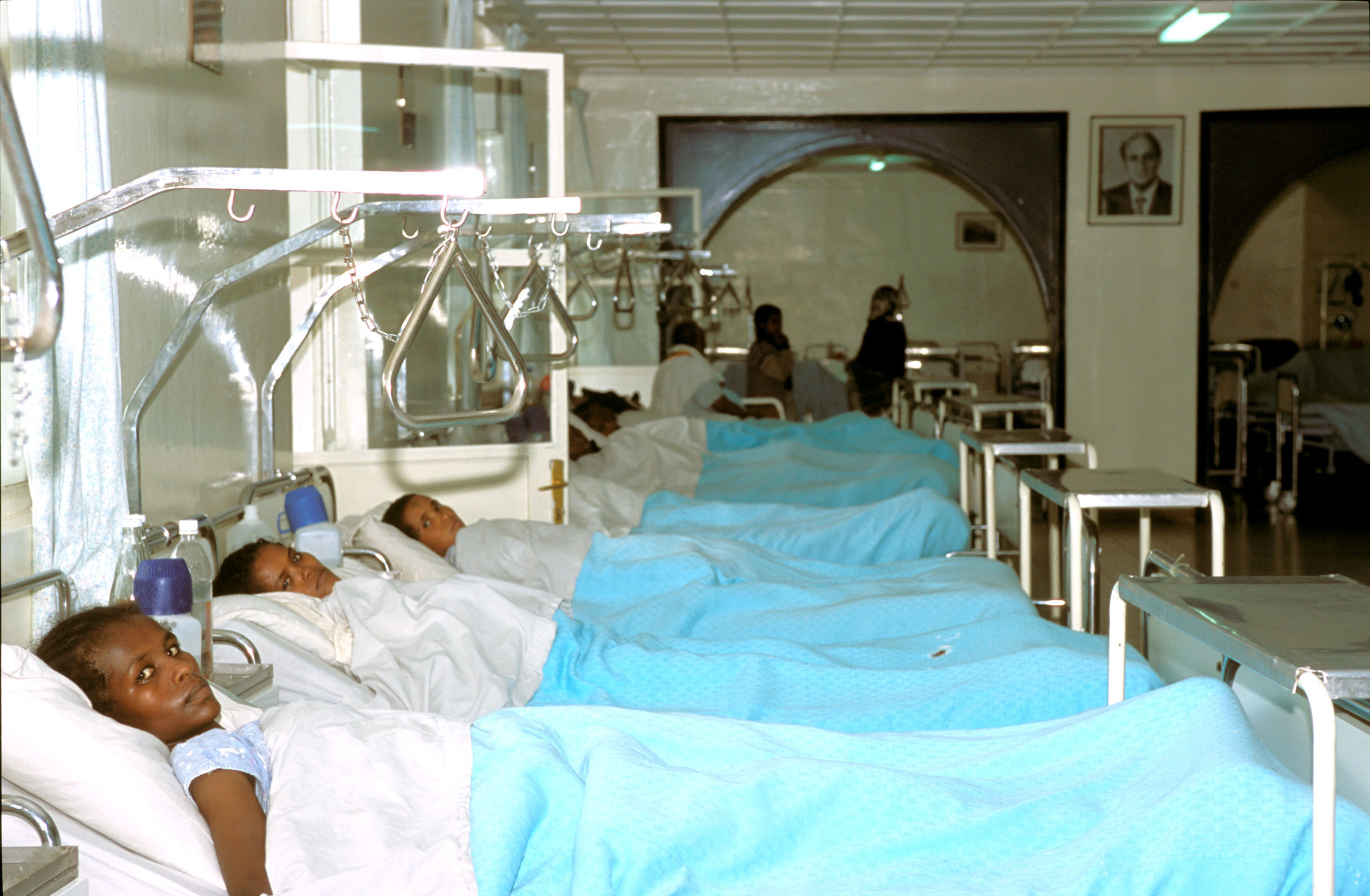
Patients at the Addis Ababa Fistula Hospital in Ethiopia are all treated free of charge.

=== Surgery ===
The nature of the injury varies depending on the size and location of the fistula, so a surgeon with experience is needed to improvise on the spot. Before the person undergoes surgery, treatment and evaluation are needed for conditions including anemia, malnutrition, and malaria. Quality treatment in low-resource settings is possible (as in the cases of Nigeria and Ethiopia).

Treatment is available through reconstructive surgery. Primary fistula repair has a 91% success rate. The corrective surgery costs about US$100–400, and the cost for the entire procedure, which includes the actual surgery, postoperative care, and rehabilitation support, is estimated to cost $300–450. Initial surgeries done by inadequately trained doctors and midwives increase the number of follow-up surgeries that must be performed to restore full continence. Successful surgery enables women to live normal lives and have more children, but it is recommended to have a cesarean section to prevent the fistula from recurring. Postoperative care is vital to prevent infection. Some women are not candidates for this surgery due to other health problems. In those cases, fecal diversion can help the patient, but not necessarily cure them.

Besides physical treatment, mental health services are also needed to rehabilitate fistula patients, who experience psychological trauma from being ostracized by the community and from fear of developing fistulae again. A study on the first formal counseling program for fistula survivors in Eritrea demonstrated positive results, whereby counseling significantly improved women's self-esteem, knowledge about fistulae and fistula prevention, and behavioral intentions for "health maintenance and social reintegration" following surgery.

=== Challenges ===
Challenges concerning treatment include the very high number of women needing reconstructive surgery, access to facilities and trained surgeons, and the cost of treatment. For many women, US$300 is a price they cannot afford. Access and availability of treatment also vary widely across different sub-Saharan countries. Certain regions also lack maternal care clinics that are equipped, willing to treat fistula patients, and adequately staffed. At the Evangelical Hospital of Bemberéke in Benin, only one expatriate volunteer obstetrics and gynecology doctor is available a few months per year, with one certified nurse and seven informal hospital workers. In all of Niger, two medical centers treat fistula patients. In Nigeria, more dedicated health professionals operate on up to 1,600 women with a fistula per year. The world is currently severely under capacity for treating the problem; it would take up to 400 years to treat the backlog of patients. To prevent any new cases of obstetric fistulae, about 75,000 new emergency obstetric care facilities would have to be built in Africa alone, plus an increase in financial support and an even higher number of certified doctors, midwives, and nurses needed.

Another challenge standing between women and fistula treatment is information. Most women have no idea that treatment is available. Because this is a condition of shame and embarrassment, most women hide themselves and their condition and suffer in silence. In addition, after receiving initial treatment, health education is important to prevent fistulae in subsequent pregnancies.

Another challenge is the lack of trained professionals to provide surgery for fistula patients. As a result, nonphysicians are sometimes trained to provide obstetric services. For example, the Addis Ababa Fistula Hospital has medical staff without formal degrees, and one of its top surgeons was illiterate. She had been trained over the years and now performs successful fistula surgery regularly.

=== Catheterization ===
Fistula cases can also be treated through urethral catheterization if identified early enough. The Foley catheter is recommended because it has a balloon to hold it in place. The indwelling Foley catheter drains urine from the bladder. This decompresses the bladder wall so that the wounded edges come together and stay together, giving it a greater chance of closing naturally, at least in the smaller fistulae.

About 37% of obstetric fistulae treated within 75 days after birth with a Foley catheter resolve. Even without preselecting the least complicated obstetric fistula cases, a Foley catheter by midwives after the onset of urinary incontinence could treat over 25% of all new fistulae.

== Epidemiology ==
Obstetric fistulae are common in the developing world, especially in sub-Saharan Africa (Kenya, Mali, Niger, Nigeria, Rwanda, Sierra Leone, South Africa, Benin, Chad, Malawi, Mali, Mozambique, Niger, Nigeria, Uganda, and Zambia) and much of South Asia (Afghanistan, Bangladesh, India, Pakistan, and Nepal). According to the World Health Organization (WHO), an estimated 50,000 to 100,000 women develop obstetric fistulae each year and over two million women currently live with an obstetric fistula. In particular, most of the two million-plus women in developing nations who develop obstetric fistulae are under the age of 30. Between 50 and 80% of women under the age of 20 in poor countries develop obstetric fistulae (the youngest patients are 12–13 years old). Other estimates indicate about 73,000 new cases occur per year.

Obstetric fistulae were very common throughout the world. Since the late 19th century, the rise of gynecology has developed safe practices for childbirth, including giving birth at local hospitals rather than at home, which dramatically reduced rates of obstructed labor and obstetric fistulae in Europe and North America.

Adequate population-based epidemiological data on obstetric fistulae are lacking due to the historic neglect of this condition since it was mostly eradicated in developed nations. Available data estimates should be viewed with caution. About 30% of women over age 45 in developed nations are affected by urinary incontinence. The rate of obstetrical fistulae is much lower in places that discourage early marriage, encourage and provide general education for women, and grant women access to family planning and skilled medical teams to assist during childbirth.

== History ==
Evidence of obstetric fistula dates back to 2050 BCE, when Queen Henhenit had a fistula.

Obstetric fistulae were first described by various Egyptian documents known as the papyri. These documents, including rare medical engravings, were found in the entrance of a tomb located in the necropolis of Saqquarah, Egypt. The tomb belonged to an unknown physician who lived during the 6th dynasty. The translation of this document became possible with the discovery of the Rosetta stone in 1799.

In 1872, the Ebers papyrus was discovered in a mummy from the Theban acropolis. This papyrus, 65 feet long, 14 inches wide, consisting of 108 columns each about 20 lines, now resides in the library at the University of Leipzig. The gynecological reference in this papyrus addresses uterine prolapse. At the end of page three, there seems to be a mention of the vesicovaginal fistula, warning the physician against trying to cure it, saying, "prescription for a woman whose urine is in an irksome place: if the urine keeps coming and she distinguishes it, she will be like this forever." This seems to be the oldest reference to vesicovaginal fistula, one which articulates the storied history of the problem.

James Marion Sims, in 1852 in Alabama, developed an operation for fistula. He worked at the New York Women's Hospital.

== Society and culture ==
During most of the 20th century, obstetric fistulae were largely missing from the international global health agenda. This is reflected by the fact that the condition was not included as a topic at the landmark United Nations 1994 International Conference on Population and Development (ICPD). The 194-page report from the ICPD does not include any reference to obstetric fistulae. In 2000, eight Millennium Development Goals were adopted after the United Nations Millennium Summit to be achieved by 2015. The fifth goal of improving maternal health is directly related to obstetric fistula. Since 2003, obstetric fistula has been gaining awareness amongst the general public and has received critical attention from UNFPA, who has organized a global "Campaign to End Fistula". New York Times columnist Nicholas Kristof, a Pulitzer Prize–winning writer, wrote several columns in 2003, 2005, and 2006 focusing on fistula and particularly treatment provided by Catherine Hamlin at the Fistula Hospital in Ethiopia. In 2007, Fistula Foundation, Engel Entertainment, and several other organizations, including PBS NOVA, released the documentary film, A Walk to Beautiful, which traced the journey of five women from Ethiopia who sought treatment for their obstetric fistulae at the Addis Ababa Fistula Hospital in Ethiopia. The film still airs frequently on PBS in the U.S. and is credited with greatly increasing awareness of obstetric fistulae. Increased public awareness and corresponding political pressure have helped fund the UNFPA's Campaign to End Fistula. They helped motivate the United States Agency for International Development to dramatically increase funding for the prevention and treatment of obstetric fistulae.

Countries that signed the United Nations Millennium Declaration have begun adopting policies and creating task forces to address issues of maternal morbidity and infant mortality, including Tanzania, Democratic Republic of Congo, Sudan, Pakistan, Bangladesh, Burkina Faso, Chad, Mali, Uganda, Eritrea, Niger, and Kenya. Laws to increase the minimum age for marriage have also been enacted in Bangladesh, Nigeria, and Kenya. To monitor these countries and hold them accountable, the UN has developed six "process indicators", a benchmark tool with minimum acceptable levels that measures whether or not women receive the services they need.

The UNFPA set out several strategies to address fistulae, including "postponing marriage and pregnancy for young girls, increasing access to education and family planning services for women and men, provide access to adequate medical care for all pregnant women and emergency obstetric care for all who develop complications, and repairing physical damage through medical intervention and emotional damage through counselling." One of the UNFPA's initiatives to reduce the cost of transportation in accessing medical care provided ambulances and motorcycles for women in Benin, Chad, Guinea, Guinea-Bissau, Kenya, Rwanda, Senegal, Tanzania, Uganda, and Zambia.

=== Campaign to end fistula ===
The Addis Ababa Fistula Hospital in Ethiopia successfully treats women with obstetric fistulae, even in less-than-desirable environments. As a result, the UNFPA gathered partners in London in 2001 and officially launched an international initiative to address obstetric fistulae later in 2003. Partners in this initiative include Columbia University's Averting Maternal Death and Disability Program, the International Federation of Gynecology and Obstetrics, and the World Health Organization. The official international partnership formed by the Campaign to End Fistula is named the Obstetric Fistula Working Group (OFWG), and its purpose is to coordinate and collaborate global efforts to eliminate obstetric fistulae.

The initiative's first action was to assess the issue in countries where the prevalence is suspected to be high quantitatively, including nine countries in sub-Saharan Africa. The studies found that fistula patients are mostly illiterate, young, and poor women. Moreover, local legislators and government officials' lack of awareness exacerbates the problem. The OFWG improves awareness for prenatal and neonatal care and develops strategies for clinically managing obstetric fistula cases.

To date, the Campaign to End Fistula has involved more than 30 countries in sub-Saharan Africa, South Asia, and the Middle East, and completed rapid needs assessments in many of those countries. The strategies that the campaign helps each nation to develop are three-fold: prevention of new cases, treatment for patients, and support for reintegration into society after the operation. Prevention efforts include access to maternal health services and mobilizing communities and legislators to increase awareness of maternal health problems. Training health providers and ensuring affordable treatment services, as well as providing social services such as health education and mental health services, help treat and reintegrate women into their communities. Other tasks undertaken by the campaign include fundraising, introducing new donors, and gathering new partners of all perspectives, such as faith-based organizations, NGOs, and private-sector companies.

=== Fistula Fortnight ===
The Fistula Fortnight was a two-week initiative that took place from February 21 to March 6, 2005. There, fistula experts treated fistula patients for free at four surgical camps in the northern Nigerian states of Kano, Katsina, Kebbi, and Sokoto. The initiative was collaborated by many partners, such as the federal and state governments of Nigeria, 13 Nigerian fistula surgeons, the Nigerian Red Cross, and UNFPA. During the nine-month preparation period, facilities were renovated, equipment was provided, and staff were extensively trained to treat fistula. The goals of this initiative were to alleviate the backlog of patients waiting for surgery, provide treatment services at host sites, and raise awareness for maternal health.

The Fistula Fortnight treated 569 women at no cost, with an 87.8% rate of successful closures. Follow-up treatments and services were provided, such as bed rest, analgesics, oral fluids, visual monitoring of urination by nurses, a catheter, catheter removal, and an examination and discharge from the hospital at a minimum of four weeks, with instructions to avoid sexual intercourse. The Fistula Fortnight also had preoperative and postoperative counseling by nurses and social workers, and held health education workshops for fistula patients and their families.

=== Community organizations ===
People recovering from a fistula in the postoperative period need support to achieve full reintegration into society. In particular, physical labor is limited in the first year of recovery, so women need alternative ways to earn an income. Since poverty is an indirect cause of obstetric fistulae, some community organizations aim to provide postoperative services to enhance the women's socioeconomic situation. Delta Survie, located in Mopti, Mali, is a community center that provides skills training and helps women to produce handmade jewelry to generate income and meet other women while they recover. Another organization, IAMANEH Suisse, identifies Malian fistula patients, facilitates operations for those without the financial means, and helps them access follow-up services to prevent recurrence of fistulae in their subsequent pregnancies.

Other organizations also help arrange mission trips for medical personnel to visit countries with women affected by fistulae, perform surgeries, and train local doctors to give medical assistance for fistula patients. The International Organization for Women and Development (IOWD) is one such nonprofit organization. The IOWD hosts four to five mission trips per year to provide relief to obstetric fistula patients in West Africa. IOWD mission trip members have evaluated thousands of patients at no cost and performed surgeries for over a thousand women.

=== Treatment centers ===
A complete fistula treatment center includes investigative services, such as laboratory work, radiology, and a blood bank, to ensure that patients' medical history is clearly understood before treatment options are evaluated. The surgical services would include operating theaters, postoperative wards, and anesthetic services. Physiotherapy and social reintegration services are also necessary to arm women affected by obstetric fistula with the tools necessary to re-enter a society from which they have been ostracised. The size of the facility should be tailored to the needs of the area, and the most successful centers collaborate with other treatment centers and organizations, thus forming a larger network of resources. The cost of salaries, single-use medical equipment, up-to-date technology and equipment, and maintenance of infrastructure collectively provide large economic burdens to treatment centers. A barrier also arises when governments and local authorities require that approval be obtained before the construction of centers. There is an uneven distribution of specialized health care providers due to suboptimal training and supervision of healthcare workers and low wages for fistula surgeons. Most fistula surgeons come from developed countries and are brought to developing countries, the nations more often affected by fistula, by a variety of organizations. An example of a well-functioning treatment center is in Bangladesh, where a facility has been created in association with the Dhaka Medical College Hospital with support from the United Nations Population Fund. Here, 46 doctors and 30 nurses have been trained and have successfully doubled the number of fistula cases addressed and operated on. Another example is a fistula unit in N'djamena, Chad, which has a mobile clinic that travels to rural, hard-to-reach areas to provide services. It works in association with Liberty Hospital. The World Health Organization has created a manual articulating necessary principles for surgical and pre- and post- operative care regarding obstetric fistula, providing a beneficial outline for affected nations. Treatment centers are crucial for the survival of obstetric fistula patients and well-equipped centers help the emotional, physical, and psychological aspects of their lives.

== See also ==
- Double dye test
- Shout Gladi Gladi
