= Mothers of Gynecology Movement =

Social movement

The Mothers of Gynecology Movement sprang out of criticism of 19th century American gynecologist J. Marion Sims' experimental surgeries on enslaved Black women who were unable to consent to their surgeries. Their surgeries were often performed without anesthesia. His work has been described in the late 20th century as an example of racism in the medical profession. Though Sims had many patients, there are only three known patients of his: Anarcha Westcott, and two lesser known women, Lucy and Betsey, who have been described as the "mothers of gynecology" in the United States, to demonstrate the contributions of their experiences to modern medicine.

In 2017, NYC Mayor Bill de Blasio launched a commission to evaluate a statue of J. Marion Sims in Central Park. During the 90-day evaluation period, author J. C. Hallman's essay about the Sims monument, "Monumental Error", appeared on the cover of Harper's Magazine. Hallman's essay was published during the time of the New York City Public Design Commission held public forums to evaluate monuments city-wide. The piece contributed to the greater, nationwide debate about the role of Confederate monuments. The article was distributed to the entire commission. The Sims statue was voted out by unanimous decision and removed in April 2018.

In March 2021, artist Michelle Browder, an activist for the recognition of racial bias towards the Black community, held an event in Los Angeles where she asked the public to bring discarded metal objects so they could be melted down in order to create a monument to the mothers of gynecology. Sims reported in his own medical literature that Anarcha was 17 and pregnant when he completed the first of 30 total surgeries on her; Lucy spent three months in recovery from a surgery of his. Browder said to the San Francisco Chronicle: "If you've ever had a Pap smear, you have Anarcha, Lucy and Betsey to thank." The monument was erected in Montgomery, Alabama on September 24, 2021. "Discarded objects represent how Black women have been treated in this country," Browder said to the Los Angeles Times. "But it also represents the beauty that's in the broken and the discarded."

== See also ==
- Mothers of Gynecology Monument
