= Betsey (gynecology) =

Enslaved woman

== Betsey ==
=== Introduction ===
Betsey (sometimes Betsy) was an enslaved girl from Montgomery, Alabama, who became one of the subjects of experimental gynecological surgery performed by physician J. Marion Sims in the mid-19th century.

=== Experimental Procedures ===
After giving birth at age 18 (sometimes thought to be age 16), she developed a vesicovaginal fistula and suffered from urinary incontinence. She was experimented upon alongside two other enslaved girls, Anarcha and Lucy, over the course of four years while being leased from her owner. The procedures performed on these girls were repeated, without consent, and without the use of anesthesia, causing them to experience great pain. Due to their enslavement trying refusing treatment could mean beatings or death.

=== Mothers of Gynecology Monument ===
Artist Michelle Browder is seeking to bring more recognition to these three girls, unveiling a monument of Betsey, Anarcha and Lucy called "The Mothers of Gynecology" in Montgomery Alabama, in September 2021. The monument is located on the Move Up Campus not far from where Sims' experiments took place.

=== Art Exhibits ===
Betsey along with Anarcha and Lucy where honored in an art exhibit titled "Call and Response: A Narrative of Reverence to Our Foremothers in Gynecology" by Jules Arthur commissioned by the Resilient Sisterhood Project.
