= Mothers of Gynecology Monument =

Monument in Montgomery, Alabama, U.S.

- Artist: Michelle Browder
- Year: 2021
- Location: Montgomery, Alabama, United States; 32.370963°N 86.309693°W

The Mothers of Gynecology Monument by Michelle Browder was unveiled in Montgomery, Alabama, on September 24, 2021. It is located at 17 Mildred Street, near the National Memorial for Peace and Justice, and is, in part, 15 feet (4.6 m) tall. The statues depict Anarcha Westcott, Betsey, and Lucy, three enslaved women, who had no agency and who were either bought or rented from their enslavers, were patients of controversial doctor and "father of gynecology" J. Marion Sims, whose office was nearby. The statues were made from discarded metal objects—the artist asked for contributions from the public—"to symbolize how Black women have been treated and to demonstrate the beauty in the broken and discarded."

The statue of Anarcha Westcott, at 15 feet, is the tallest of the three statues, with Betsy at 9 feet, and Lucy at 12 feet. Michelle Browder has stated that she chose to create such tall statues so that "never again [would] anyone look down on these women." All of the statues have symbolic images. Two of the statues have replicas of a slave ship on their bodies, Anarcha around her legs, and Lucy around her waist. Anarcha's womb, created by Montgomery artist Deborah Shedrick, is discarded at her side, and is full of sharp objects representing the pain that she endured, as well as the bondage these women suffered. The statue of Betsy is pregnant and wears a crown made of speculums, a piece of gynecological equipment some have attributed to J Marion Sims. Her statue is inscribed with the names of important women who were either enslaved, or were vital female figures in the Civil Rights Movement. The statue of Lucy has hair in Bantu knots made of bicycle chains, meant to symbolize both her African heritage and her enslavement.

The monument was created in response to a statue of J. Marion Sims, which still stands on the capitol lawn in Montgomery. In 2018, a statue of Sims in New York was taken down, in protest of the torture of Anarcha, Betsey, Lucy, and the other enslaved women who Sims exploited.

== See also ==
- 2021 in art
- Mothers of Gynecology Movement
- Statue of J. Marion Sims
