= Michelle Browder =

American artist and activist

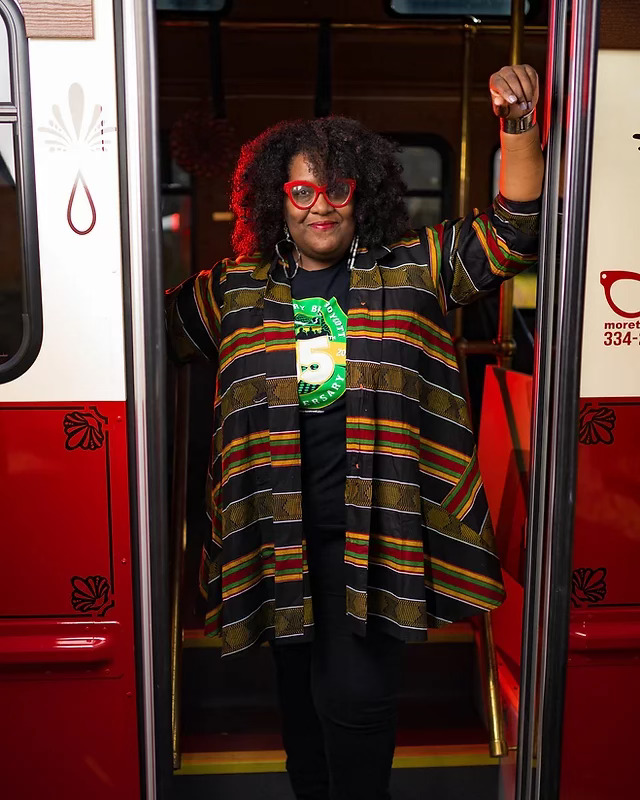
- Born: 1971 (age 54–55)
- Notable work: Mothers of Gynecology Monument, You May Feel a Little Pressure
- Awards: USA Today Woman of the Year, Alabama 2022
- Website: https://www.anarchalucybetsey.org/

Michelle Browder (born 1971) is an American artist and activist known for her sculptures in Montgomery, Alabama, and historical tours of the area.

== Early life and education ==
Browder was born in Denver, Colorado and her family moved to Verbena, Alabama before she started school. Her father, Curtis Browder was a prison chaplain, the first Black person to serve in this role in Alabama. Browder's aunt is Aurelia Browder, who was arrested for sitting in the white section of a city bus and was the plaintiff in Browder v. Gayle. As a child, Browder was encouraged by her father to express her anger through art and creativity, which led to her attending the Art Institute of Atlanta.

== Work ==
Browder is known for her activism, her tours of Montgomery, Alabama, and her outdoor sculptures. She founded two youth non-profit programs to help young people in Alabama: "I Am More Than" and More Up Cafe. She has also worked to provide homes to people in Alabama During the time from 2002 to 2007, she opened a restaurant called PJR's Fish and BBQ Restaurants. She campaigned for Barack Obama prior to the 2008 election, and talked about black entrepreneurs opening new businesses in 2018 on the PBS NewsHour. Browder is the owner and operator of More Than Tours, a tour company which provides educational tours about racial bias and history to students and tourists in Montgomery, Alabama. Browder announced in 2020 that she was creating a monument to the mothers of gynecology, enslaved women including Anarcha Westcott, who were operated on by J. Marion Sims in the 1840s. She then, in March 2021, held an event in Los Angeles where she asked the public to bring discarded metal objects so they could be melted down to be formed into the monument. "Discarded objects represent how Black women have been treated in this country,” Browder said to The Los Angeles Times. “But it also represents the beauty that’s in the broken and the discarded." Browder first learned of Sims while a student at the Art Institute of Atlanta. She said to the San Francisco Chronicle: "If you’ve ever had a pap smear, you have Anarcha, Lucy and Betsey to thank."

In 2020, Browder designed a mural for Black Lives Matter that was painted near the site of Montgomery's former slave market and was featured on The TODAY show. Browder's work has been featured in The New York Times as a notable representation of Montgomery's complicated past and as a representation of the evolution of civil rights as well as commemorating the centennial ratification of women's right to vote. She was the designer and artist of #TheMarchContinues Mural at the Southern Poverty Law Center.

February 27, 2023 she was again featured on the PBS Newshour discussing her mothers of gynecology public art.

In May 2023, Browder announced that she has acquired the 33 South Perry street and it will be transformed into the Mothers of Gynecology Health and Wellness Museum and Clinic, providing resources to uninsured women, medical practitioners, midwives and doulas.

== Awards ==
In 2020 Browder was given the Community Hero Award by the Mayor of Montgomery, Todd Strange, for her efforts as a bridge builder in her community using art, history, and conservation. Governor Kay Ivey presented Browder with the Rising Star in Tourism Award from the state of Alabama.

In 2022, Browder was named as one of USA Today's Women of the Year, which recognizes women who have made a significant impact.

== See also ==
- Anarcha Westcott
- Mothers of Gynecology Monument
