= Nathan Bozeman =

American physician (1825–1905)

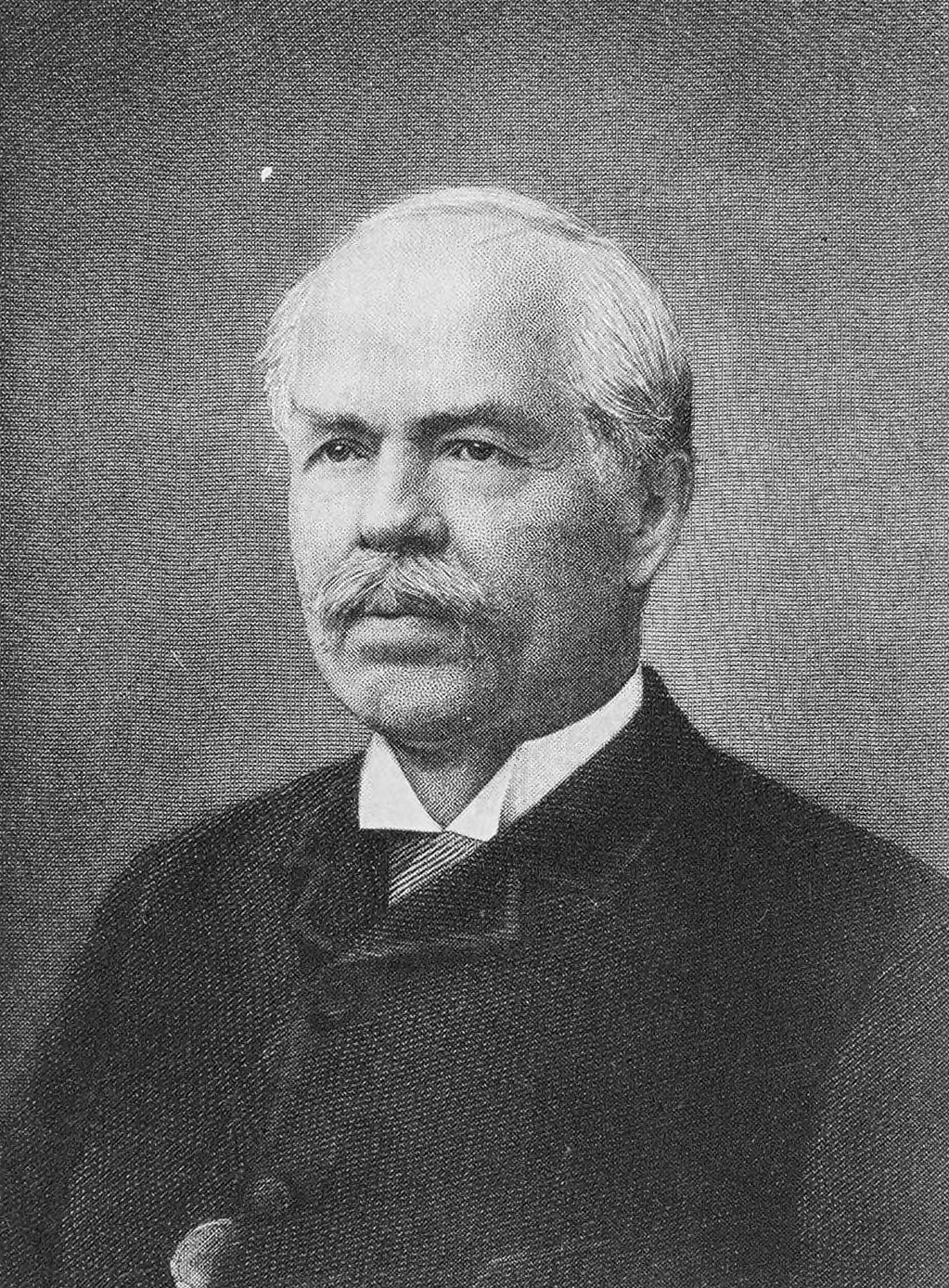
Bozeman in an undated photograph

Nathan Bozeman (March 25, 1825 — February 16, 1905), was a physician and early gynecologist, first in Montgomery, Alabama, and then in New York City. He studied medicine at the University of Louisville, graduating in 1848.

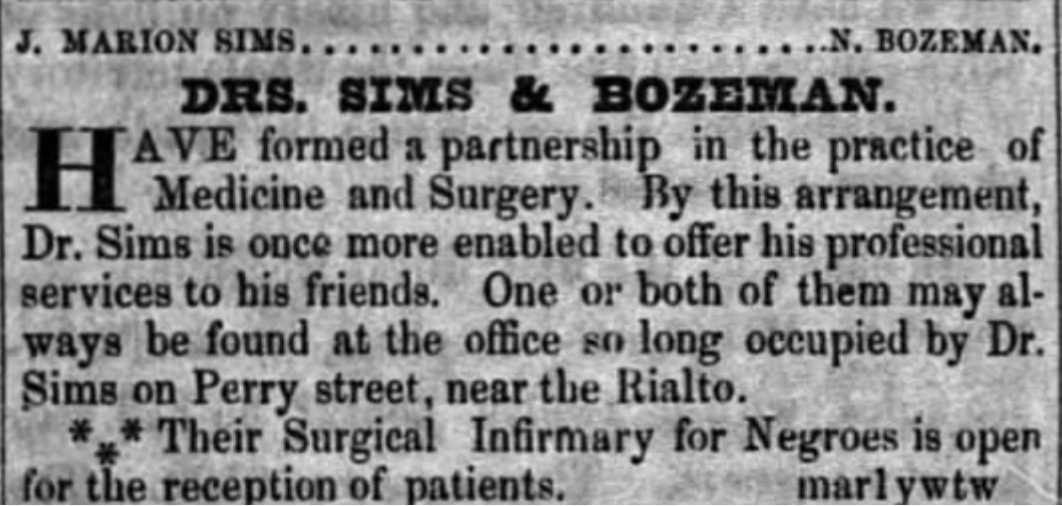
Sims' and Bozeman's Surgical Infirmary for Negroes

He was collaborator of and then critic of controversial physician J. Marion Sims, whose practice and home in Montgomery he purchased in 1853, when Dr. Sims had to leave Alabama because of his health. Bozeman succeeded Sims as surgeon of the New York Woman's Hospital.

Bozeman conducted gynecological surgeries on slaves in Alabama.

He served as a surgeon for the Confederate States of America during the Civil War, and was present at the First Battle of Manassas.

Bozeman and Prof. Gustave Simon had a controversial dispute in the 1870s, about the "wide and indiscriminate" use of Colpocleisis that existed at that time.
