= Sims' position =

Human position used for rectal examination, treatments, and enemas

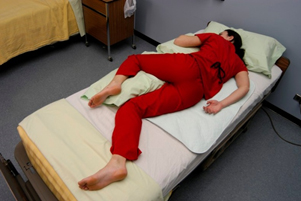
Right lateral Sims position. (The more usual left lateral Sims position, suitable for a right-handed practitioner, has the patient lying on their left side.)

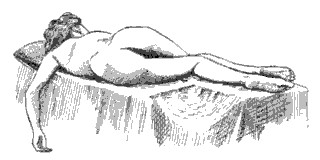
Posterior view of Sims' position

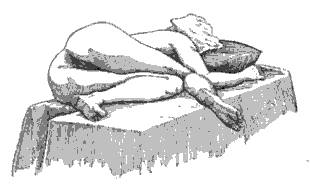
Anterior view of Sims' position

Sims' position, or left lateral Sims' position, named after the gynaecologist J. Marion Sims, is usually used for rectal examination, treatments, enemas, and examining patients for vaginal wall prolapse.

Sims' position has the person lying on the left side, with the left hip and lower extremity straight, and the right hip and knee bent. It is also called lateral recumbent position. Sims' is sometimes the person lying on the left side with both legs bent.

J. Marion Sims developed the Sims position and other techniques in the course of experimental vesicovaginal fistula surgery on enslaved women, performing operations without anesthesia. Although anesthetics were not yet standard practice, his experimentation involved multiple painful surgeries before he perfected the technique: one patient had 29 failed attempts over four years before the final success. His techniques did benefit that patient in the end, and countless future patients, but as the experimentation was performed on enslaved women with no anaesthesia and no possibility of informed consent, it was unethical and abusive, even by the standards of his time.

== Detailed description ==
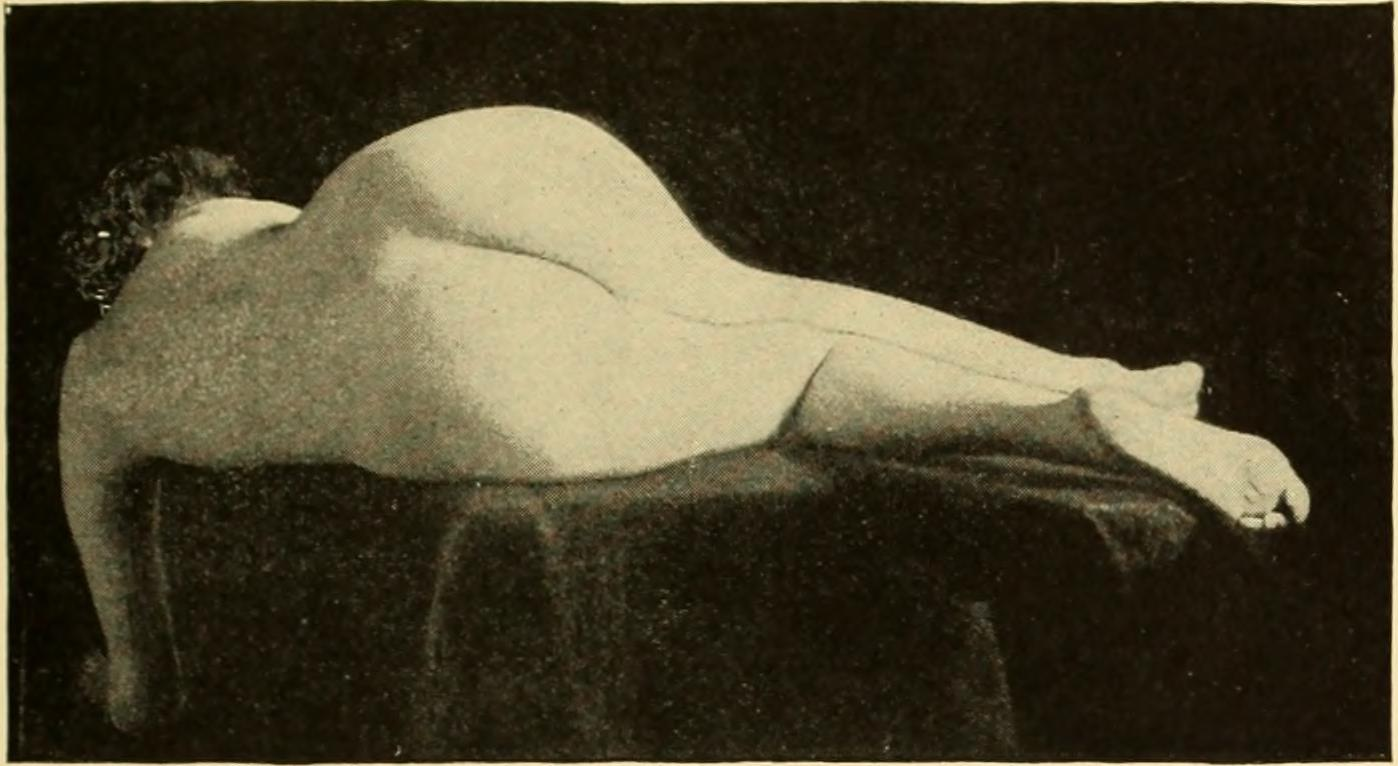
Left Sims' position

The position is described as follows:

1. Patient lies on their left side.
2. Patient's left lower extremity is straightened.
3. Patient's right lower extremity is flexed at the hip, and the leg is flexed at the knee. The bent knee, resting against bed surface or a pillow, provides stability.
4. Arms should be comfortably placed beside the patient, not underneath.

Common uses:

1. Administering enemas
2. Postpartum perineal examination
3. Per-rectal examination
4. Osteopathic manipulative treatment techniques

== See also ==
- Recovery position – First aid technique
- Sigmoidoscopy – Medical examination of the large intestine from the rectum to the sigmoid colon
