= J. Marion Sims =

American physician and gynecologist (1813–1883)

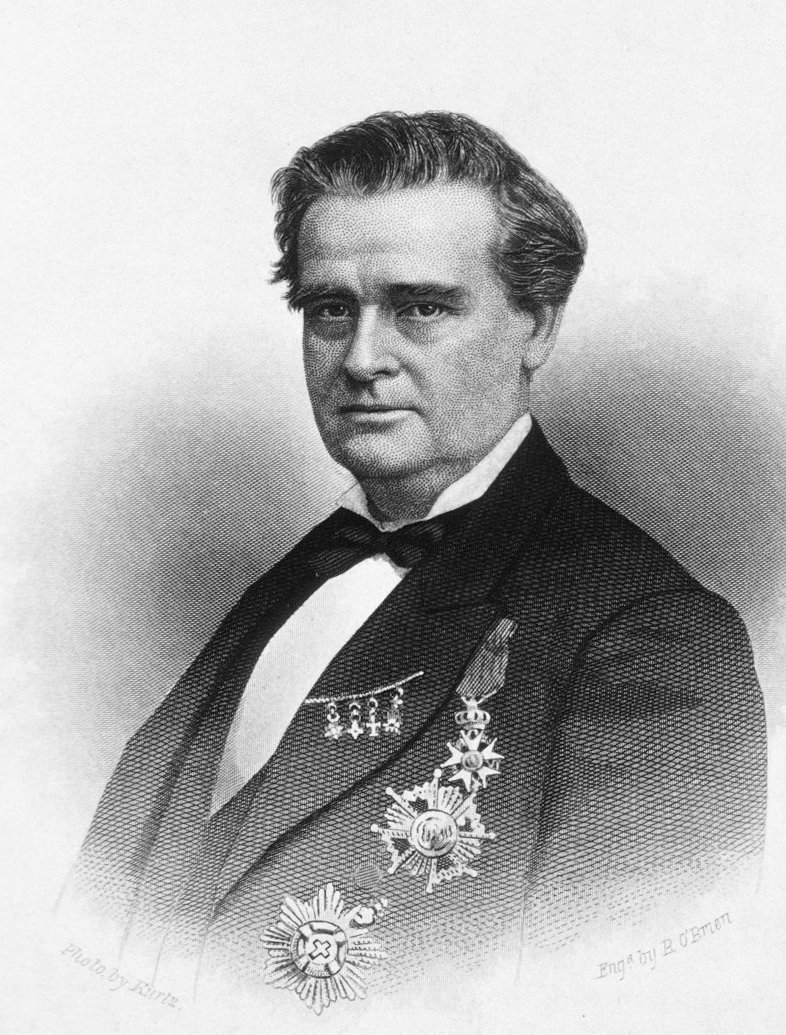
- J. Marion Sims, engraving after photograph, ca. 1880
- Born: James Marion Sims; January 25, 1813; Lancaster County, South Carolina, U.S.
- Died: November 13, 1883 (aged 70); New York City, U.S.
- Resting place: Green-Wood Cemetery, Brooklyn, New York, U.S.
- Education: Jefferson Medical College
- Occupation: Surgeon
- Known for: vesicovaginal surgery
- Spouse: Theresa Jones
- Children: 9
- Relatives: John Allan Wyeth (son-in-law); Marion Sims Wyeth (grandson); John Allan Wyeth (grandson)

James Marion Sims (January 25, 1813 – November 13, 1883) was an American medical doctor in the field of surgery. His most famous work was the development of a surgical technique for the repair of vesicovaginal fistula, a severe complication of obstructed childbirth. He developed this technique via non-consensual and unanesthetized surgeries on enslaved black women Anarcha Westcott, Lucy and Betsey and impoverished Irish women. He is also remembered for inventing the Sims speculum, the Sims sigmoid catheter, and Sims' position. Against significant opposition, he established, in New York, the first hospital in the United States specifically for women. He was forced out of the hospital he founded because he insisted on treating cancer patients; he played a small role in the creation of the nation's first cancer hospital, which opened after his death.

Sims was one of the most famous and admired American physicians of his era. He was elected President of the American Medical Association in 1876, and he was one of the first American physicians to become famous in Europe. He openly boasted that he was the second-wealthiest doctor in the country. However, as medical ethicist Barron H. Lerner states, "one would be hard pressed to find a more controversial figure in the history of medicine." A statue in his honor was erected in 1894 in New York City's Bryant Park, the first statue in the United States in honor of a physician. It stood for 124 years before being removed in 2018.

Today, many medical ethicists criticize how Sims developed his surgical techniques. He operated on some enslaved black women and girls who, like prisoners, could not meaningfully consent because they could not refuse. During the 20th century, his experiments began to be condemned as an improper use of human experimental subjects. Sims has been described as "a prime example of progress in the medical profession made at the expense of a vulnerable population". Some medical historians have defended Sims' practices as consistent with the accepted standards of his time. According to Sims, the enslaved black women upon whom he experimented were "willing" patients who had no better options for treatment.

Sims was a prolific writer and his published reports on his medical experiments, together with his own 471-page autobiography (summarized in an address just after his death), are the main sources of knowledge about him and his career. His positive self-presentation has, in the late twentieth and early twenty-first centuries, been subject to revision.

== Childhood, education, and early career ==
James Marion Sims, who preferred to be called "Marion", was born in Lancaster County, South Carolina, the son of John and Mahala (Mackey) Sims. His father, Colonel John Sims participated in the War of 1812, being stationed at Charleston. His paternal grandfather was one of Marion's men; his great-grandfather was with Washington at Braddock's defeat. His maternal grandfather, Charles Mackey, was taken prisoner by Banastre Tarleton, and would have been hanged, but for the intervention of his wife.

For the first twelve years of his life, Sims and his family lived in Lancaster Village, north of Hanging Rock Creek, where his father owned a store. Sims later wrote of his early school days there.

After his father was elected sheriff of Lancaster County, he sent Sims in 1825 to the newly established Franklin Academy, in Lancaster. In 1832, after two years of study at the predecessor of the University of South Carolina, South Carolina College, where he was a member of the Euphradian Society, Sims worked with Dr. Churchill Jones in Lancaster, South Carolina. He took a three-month course at the Medical College of Charleston (predecessor of the Medical University of South Carolina), but found it too rigorous.

He moved to Philadelphia, Pennsylvania, in 1834 and enrolled at the Jefferson Medical College, from which he graduated in 1835 as "a lackluster student who showed little ambition after receiving his medical degree". As he put it:

I felt no particular interest in my profession at the beginning of it apart from making a living.... I was really ready at any time and at any moment to take up anything that offered, or that held out any inducement of fortune, because I knew that I could never make a fortune out of the practice of medicine.

He returned to Lancaster to practice. As of that date "he had had no clinical experience, logged no actual hospital time, and had no experience diagnosing illnesses." After his first two patients (infants) died, Sims was despondent. He left and set up a practice in Mount Meigs, near Montgomery, Alabama. He described the settlement in a letter to his future wife Theresa Jones as "nothing but a pile of gin-houses, stables, blacksmith-shops, grog-shops, taverns and stores, thrown together in one promiscuous huddle". He was in Mount Meigs from 1835 to 1837. Sims visited Lancaster in 1836 to marry Theresa, whom he had met many years earlier, when a student in Lancaster. She was the daughter of B.C. Jones, and the niece of Churchill Jones, and had studied at the South Carolina Female Collegiate Institute.

In 1837 Sims and his wife moved to Cubahatchee, Alabama, where they remained until 1840. He was a "plantation physician", who had "a partnership in a large practice among rich plantations." "Sims became known for operations on clubfeet, cleft palates and crossed eyes." This was his first experience treating enslaved black women, whose owners summoned Sims to treat them. Being a "plantation physician" was not as lucrative as Sims hoped a life as a doctor would be.

== Practice in Montgomery ==
In 1840 the couple moved to Montgomery, Alabama, where they lived until 1853. Sims later described this period as the "most memorable time" of his career. Within a few years he "had the largest surgical practice in the State", and the largest practice of any doctor in Montgomery up to that time. "He was immensely popular, and greatly beloved." When he returned to the city for a visit in 1877, he was treated as a hero.

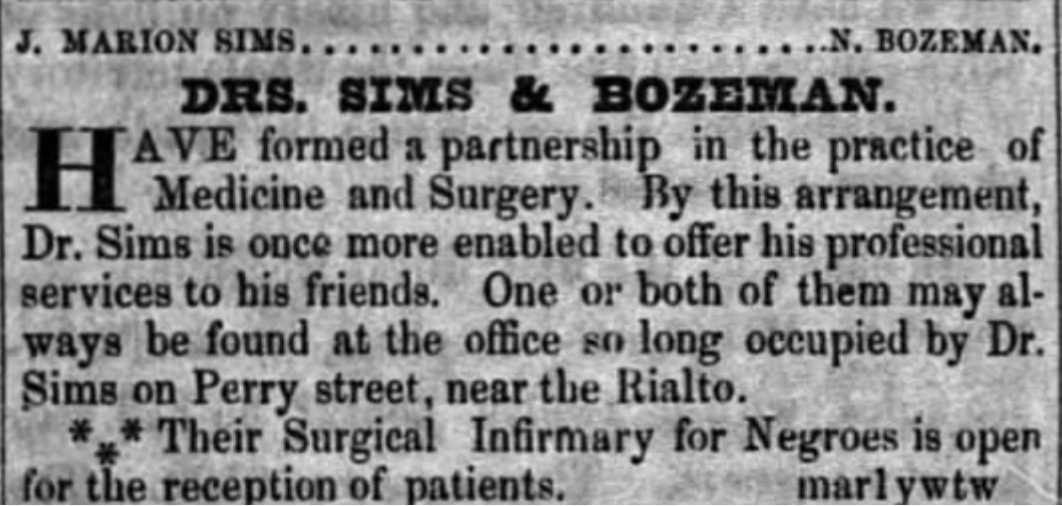
Sims' Surgical Infirmary for Negroes

In Montgomery, Sims continued essentially his practice as a plantation physician: treating the enslaved, who then made up two thirds of the city's population. He built a hospital or "Surgical Infirmary for Negroes", for those women their owners brought him for treatment. It began with four beds, but it was so successful he added a second floor, doubling capacity to eight beds. One source says it expanded to twelve beds. It has been called "the first woman's hospital in history". It was also the first hospital specifically for Black people in the United States.

In 1840, the field of gynecology did not exist; there was no training on the subject, for Sims or anyone else. The only books were on midwifery. Medical students did not study pregnancy, childbirth, or gynecological diseases. Student doctors were often trained on dummies to deliver babies. They did not see their first clinical cases of women until beginning their practices. "The practice of examining the female organs was considered repugnant by doctors." Sims shared this view, remarking in his autobiography that "if there was anything I hated, it was investigating the organs of the female pelvis".

== Medical experimentation on enslaved women and girls ==
=== Repair of vesicovaginal fistulas ===
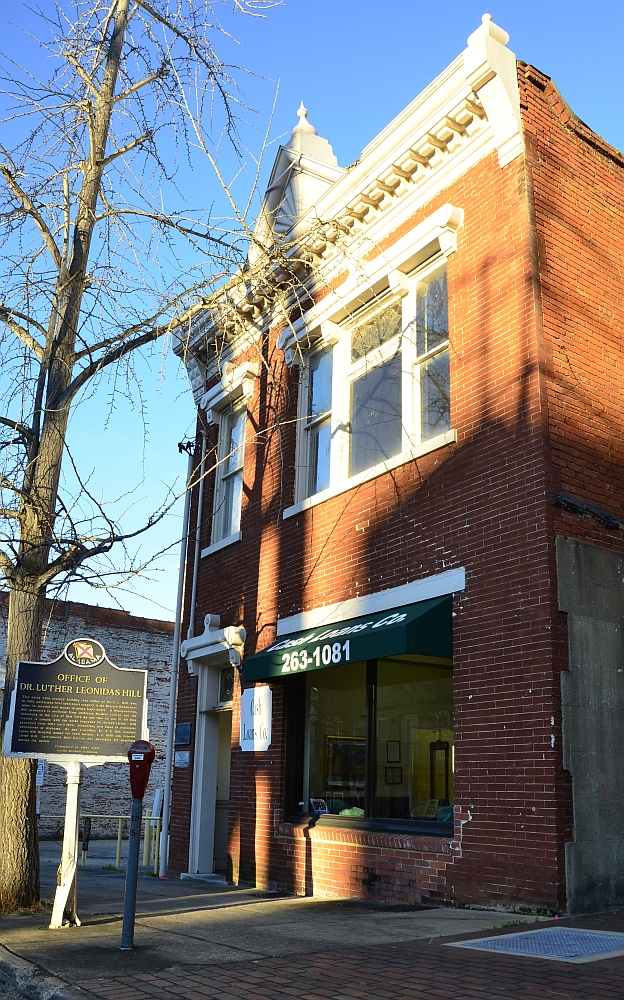
Site of Sims' office in Montgomery, Alabama.

In 1845 Sims was brought a woman with a condition he had not seen before: vesicovaginal fistula. Although not fatal, in the nineteenth century, vesicovaginal fistulas were "one of the most loathsome and disagreeable maladies to which females are subject," and a common, socially destructive, and a terrible complication of childbirth that affected many women. There was no effective cure or treatment. In an era without normalized contraception and rudimentary knowledge of the processes of pregnancy and childbirth, women who gave birth frequently experienced complications afterwards. Vesicovaginal fistulas occur when the woman's bladder, cervix, and vagina become trapped between the fetal skull and the woman's pelvis, cutting off blood flow and leading to tissue death. The necrotic tissue later sloughs off, leaving a hole. Following this injury, as urine forms, it leaks from the vagina, leading to a form of incontinence. Because a continuous stream of urine leaks from the vagina, it is difficult to keep the area clean. Such personal hygiene issues often lead to marginalization from society as well as vaginal irritation, scarring, and loss of vaginal function. Sims also worked to repair rectovaginal fistulas, a similar condition in which flatulence and feces escape from the rectum through a tear in the tissue separating it from the vagina, thus leading to fecal incontinence.

When Sims went to see a patient with an injured pelvis from a fall from a horse, he placed her in a knee-chest position and inserted his finger into the vagina. This allowed Sims to see the vagina clearly, and spurred him to investigate fistula treatment. In order to facilitate the examination of patients, he soon developed a precursor to the modern speculum, using a pewter spoon and strategically placed mirrors. As a result, he has generally been credited with the instrument's invention.

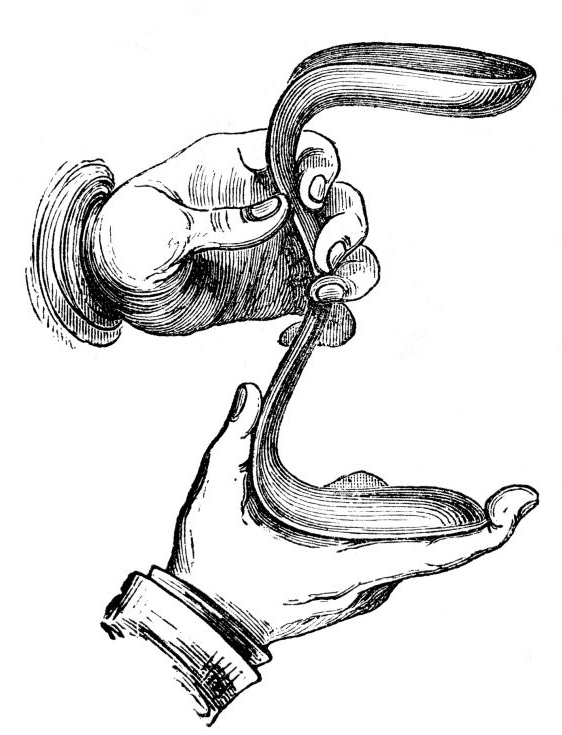
Sims' vaginal speculum.

Sims, however, was not the first to successfully treat a vesicovaginal fistula, not even in the United States; Dr. John Peter Mettauer had successfully surgically repaired one in Virginia in 1838; and Dr. George Hayward in Boston the following year. Moreover, Henry van Roonhuyse's clinical treatise entitled Medico-Chirurgical Observations (1676) had outlined essential repair steps for such conditions that are recognizable even today.

Between 1845 and 1849, Sims performed experimental surgery on enslaved black women and girls to treat vaginal problems. He added a second story to his four-bed hospital, doubling its capacity. He developed techniques that have since formed the basis of modern vaginal surgery; one key component was silver wire, which he had a jeweler prepare. Sims' vaginal speculum, described above, aided in vaginal examination and surgery. The rectal examination position, in which the patient is on the left side with the right knee flexed against the abdomen and the left knee slightly flexed, is also named for him.

=== Experimental subjects ===
Occasionally, Sims conducted experimental surgery on white women, but his main subjects were twelve enslaved black women and girls with fistulas, whom he treated at his own expense in his backyard hospital. They were brought to him by their owners. Sims searched for patients with this fistula, and succeeded in finding six or seven women and girls. Sims took responsibility for their care on the condition that the owners provide clothing and pay any taxes; Sims provided food. He purchased one woman specifically in order to experiment surgically when her owner refused to allow Sims to treat her otherwise.

The use of enslaved people for medical research was not considered controversial in the Antebellum South. A prospectus from the 1830s of the South Carolina Medical College, then the South's leading medical school, pointed out to prospective students that it had an advantage of a peculiar character:

No place in the United States offers as great opportunities for the acquisition of anatomical knowledge, subjects being obtained from among the colored population in sufficient number for every purpose, and proper dissection carried on without offending any individual in the community. Those impediments which exist in so many other places, to the prosecution of this study, are not here thrown in the path of the Student, public feeling being rather favourable than hostile to the advancement of the Science of Anatomy.

The college announced, in advertisements in the Charleston papers, that it had set up a surgery (operating room) for negroes, and offered to treat without charge, while it was in session, any "interesting cases" sent by their owners, "for the benefit and instruction of their pupils". They extended the offer to free "persons of color". The advertisement ends by pointing out that their sole objective was "to promote the interest of Medical Education."

Sims named three enslaved black women and girls in his autobiography: Anarcha, Betsy, and Lucy. Each of them suffered from fistula, and all were subjects of his surgical experimentation. Sims conducted experimental surgery on each of them several times, including operating on Anarcha thirty times before the repair of her fistulas was declared a success. Anarcha suffered from both vesicovaginal and rectovaginal fistulas, which Sims struggled to repair. "Notwithstanding repeated failures during four years' time, he kept his six patients and operated until he tired out his doctor assistants, and finally had to rely upon his patients to assist him to operate." In some cases, like Anarcha's, who is estimated to have been 13 years of age when first treated by Sims, some of the enslaved women were girls, who in having been victims of childhood sexual assault by their enslavers, were physically immature for the act of giving birth, likely contributing to the severity and extent of their childbirth complications. Unlike his previous essays, which included at least a brief description of his patients, the article issued in The American Journal of the Medical Sciences omits any identifying characteristics of Anarcha, Betsy, or Lucy. Anarcha, Lucy, and Betsy are memorialized in the statue Mothers of Gynecology, unveiled in Montgomery, Alabama, on September 24, 2021.

Sims' former collaborator, Nathan Bozeman, later supplied the names of at least four other African-American women treated by Sims during this period:

- Ann McRee, 16, treated by Sims for fistula in 1849.
- Lavinia Boudurant, 13, had a bladder calculus removed by Sims in 1850.
- Delia, 23, "Dr. Sims' own servant [slave]", who between 1850 and 1853 underwent ten or more operations for fistula repair.
- Julia McDuffie, 20, operated on by Sims for fistula closure in March 1853, and again in June 1853 by Bozeman after Sims' departure for New York.

=== Anesthesia ===
Although anesthesia had very recently been used experimentally, Sims did not use any anesthetic during his procedures on these three women. Ether anesthesia was first publicly demonstrated in Boston in 1846, a year after Sims began his experimental surgery. Sims himself indicated that he was unaware at the time of the use of diethyl ether. As late as 1853, when Sims's fistula experiments were concluded and reports on them were being published, many physicians still doubted chloroform's safety, and guidelines for its proper administration during surgery had yet to be devised and published.

In addition, a common racist belief from the time, that often persists to this day, is that black people do not feel as much pain as white people. Given this, Sims did not anesthetize the women he operated on while developing his fistula repair technique. Anesthesia was itself still experimental; early anesthetic agents were much more dangerous than the replacements developed in the twentieth century. Dosing was also imprecise: underdosing did not kill the pain; overdosing could and sometimes did kill the patient. Chloroform could be obtained from a druggist, but nitrous oxide and the highly flammable ether had to be manufactured by the surgeon on the spot. In Sims' day, surgeons were trained to operate quickly on unanesthetized patients. Anesthesia was first used in dentistry, and was just being announced as an exciting novelty in privately published pamphlets, some claiming credit for the anesthetic's first use, at the same time as Sims' fistula repair surgeries.

Sims published a paper In 1868 on his work on using nitrous oxide as an anesthetic, and in 1874 on using chloroform. In 1874 Sims addressed the New York State Medical Society on "The Discovery of Anaesthesia," in which he claimed that Americans had discovered the practice before the British, and in 1880 he delivered a paper (published soon afterwards) at the New York Academy of Medicine about a death from anesthesia.

Sims also committed other errors due to the incomplete knowledge about sanitation and infection in surgical theaters at the time. One patient, named Lucy, nearly died from sepsis after Sims operated on her in the presence of twelve doctors, experimentally using a sponge during the procedure to wipe urine from her bladder. Sims negligently left the sponge in her urethra and bladder. Although Sims eschewed using anesthesia during surgery, he did frequently administer opium to the women afterwards, which was an accepted therapeutic practice of the day.

Sims eventually perfected his technique. One of his key developments was the introduction in 1849 of silver wire as a suture, thus avoiding the infections associated with silk sutures, or the potential poisoning from using lead sutures (as Mettauer had done in 1838). Sims published an account of his successful repair of Anarcha's suture using the silver wire in his surgical reports of 1852. He proceeded to repair fistulas in several other enslaved black women.

According to Durrenda Ojanuga, after Sims' successful treatment of Anarcha, he was asked by many white women to repair vesicovaginal fistulas, but most of them were apparently unable to endure the pain of the operation. The Journal of Medical Ethics reports a case study of one white woman whose fistula was repaired by Sims without the use of anesthesia during a series of three operations in 1849.

Sims later moved to New York to found a Woman's Hospital, where he performed the operation on white women. There are some discrepancies regarding whether he used anesthesia there. Ojanuga has claimed he did not, and L. L. Wall suggests that as of 1857 Sims did not use anesthesia to perform fistula surgery on white women, citing Sims' lecture to the New York Academy of Medicine of November 18 that year, wherein Sims asserted that he never used anesthesia for fistula surgery because the procedure was not painful enough to justify the risks of administering it. Wall notes that, while Sims' refusal to use anesthetic may seem shocking, he believes that this is a reflection of the contemporary sensibilities of the mid-1800s, particularly among surgeons who began their practice in the pre-anesthetic era. Nevertheless, the fact that white women were afforded the possibility to opt out of the procedure if they could not endure the pain, in comparison to the enslaved women used to develop the procedure, reinforces the prevalence of the aforementioned racist belief that black people do not feel as much pain as white people.

== Trismus nascentium ==
During his early medical years, Sims also became interested in trismus nascentium, also known as neonatal tetanus, that occurs in newborns. A nineteenth-century doctor described it as "a disease that has been almost constantly fatal, commonly in the course of a few days; the women are so persuaded of its inevitable fatality that they seldom or ever call for the assistance of our art."

Trismus nascentium is a form of generalised tetanus. Infants who have not acquired passive immunity from the mother having been immunised are at risk for this disease. It usually occurs through infection of the unhealed umbilical stump, particularly when the stump is cut with a non-sterile instrument. In the twenty-first century, neonatal tetanus mostly occurs in developing countries, particularly those with the least-developed healthcare infrastructure. It is rare in developed countries.

Trismus nascentium is now recognized to be the result of unsanitary practices and nutritional deficiencies, but in the nineteenth century its cause was unknown, and many enslaved African children contracted this disease. Medical historians believe that the conditions of the quarters of enslaved people were the cause. Sims alluded to the idea that sanitation and living conditions played a role in its contraction, writing that

[w]henever there are poverty, and filth, and laziness, or where the intellectual capacity is cramped, the moral and social feelings blunted, there it will be oftener found. Wealth, a cultivated intellect, a refined mind, an affectionate heart, are comparatively exempt from the ravages of this unmercifully fatal malady. But expose this class to the same physical causes, and they become equal sufferers with the first.

Sims also thought trismus nascentium developed from skull bone movement during protracted births. To test this, Sims used a shoemaker's awl to pry the skull bones of enslaved infants into alignment. Sims often performed autopsies on the corpses, which he kept for further research on the condition. He blamed these fatalities on "the sloth and ignorance of their mothers and the black midwives who attended them," not the extensive experimental surgeries that he conducted upon the babies.

== New York: the Woman's Hospital ==
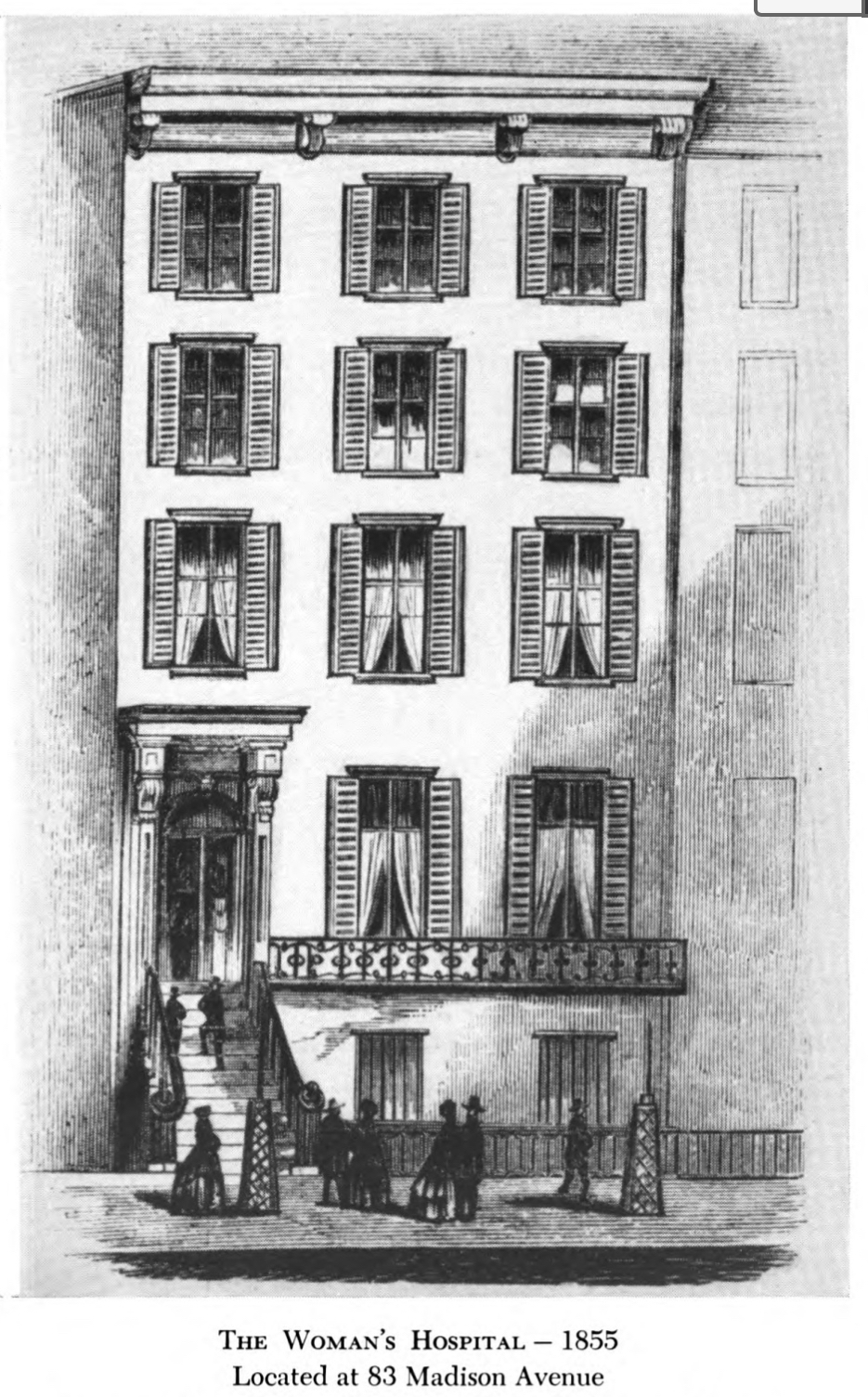
Woman's Hospital, New York City, 1855

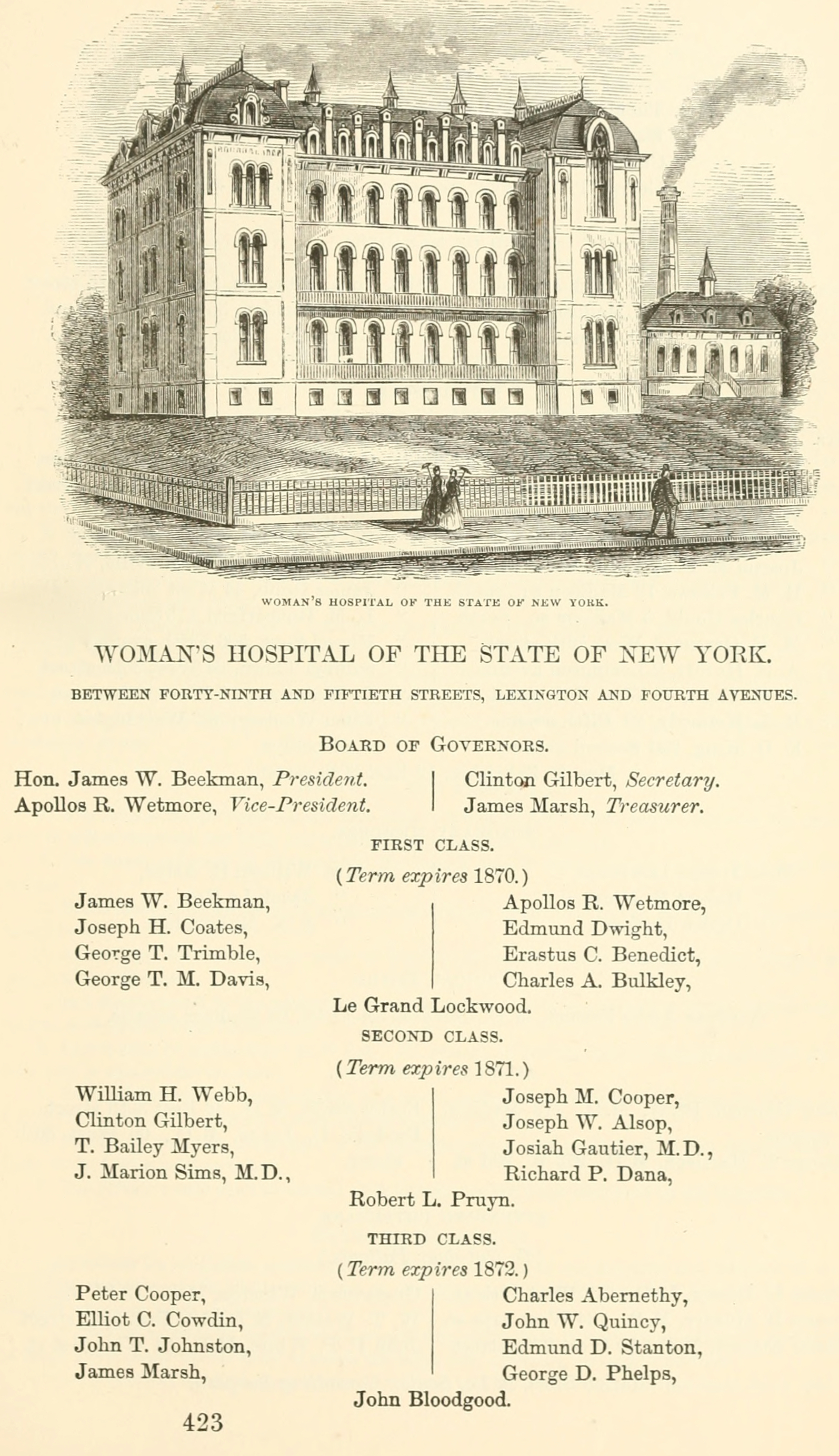
Woman's Hospital, New York City, 1870

Sims reluctantly moved to New York City in 1853 because of his health. He decided to focus on diseases of women. He had an office at 267 Madison Avenue. In 1860 a Charleston, South Carolina, newspaper described his success as "splendid," and called him "the happiest man in New York."

In 1855 he founded the Woman's Hospital, which, not counting his own backyard infirmary, was the first hospital for women in the United States. At its inception, Woman's Hospital's primary purpose was to repair vesico-vaginal fistulas using Sims' technique, in service to the poor. No "pay patients" were admitted. Located on Madison Avenue and 29th Street in a rented four-story house, a location deliberately chosen near Sims' home, the hospital's thirty beds were quickly filled. In the beginning, Sims operated without assistance from other doctors, performing one fistula repair each day. Many of his patients were poor Irish immigrant women.

His project met with "universal opposition" from the New York medical community; instead, it was due to prominent women that he established it. As Sims related, they were visited by "prominent doctors, who endeavored to convince them that they were making a mistake, that they had been deceived, [and] that no such hospital was needed" to treat their condition. He recalled that "I was called a quack and a humbug, and the hospital was pronounced a fraud. Still it went on with its work." In 1857, the New York State Legislature granted the hospital a formal charter and $50,000 for a permanent home, while the city of New York granted it the land between Fourth (now Park) and Lexington Avenues and 49th and 50th Streets in Manhattan to build its new premises, the site of today's Waldorf-Astoria Hotel. Sims would go to Europe in 1861 to study hospital architecture, particularly the new pavilion plan, as part of the planning of the new buildings. The first pavilion was completed in 1866; a second was finished in 1872.

In the Woman's Hospital, Sims usually performed his operations on indigent women in an operating theatre so that medical students and other doctors could view it, as was considered fundamental to medical education at the time. Some patients remained in the hospital indefinitely and underwent repeated procedures.

When Sims addressed the American Medical Association in 1858 on the topic "Treatment of the results of obstructed labor", the "charts" which illustrated it "caused the lady auditors to vacate the gallery."

== Sims and the Confederacy ==
Sims' Southern sympathies were no secret—he was no abolitionist—and even in New York, many of his patients were Southern ladies. As the American Civil War drew near, this practice fell away, and he did not feel comfortable remaining in New York.

In 1861 Sims, who considered himself "a loyal Southerner," moved to Europe. There, he toured hospitals at first primarily for the purpose of researching hospital architecture for the new premises of his Woman's Hospital in New York, then still in the planning stages, but his renown soon permitted him to demonstrate his vesicovaginal repair surgery multiple times. First, he arrived in Dublin and performed one in front of Dr. Fleetwood Churchill and other colleagues. He then proceeded to Edinburgh to see Sir James Young Simpson operate on dysmenorrhea, but evidently "did not think it well done." From there, he went to London, and performed a second fistula repair with several colleagues on hand to observe, including Dr. Thomas Spencer Wells (soon to be appointed Queen Victoria's household surgeon). The patient, however, died within six days because, as the autopsy showed, Sims had inadvertently closed the patient's ureter. Undaunted, he went to Paris in September 1861, where he performed fistula repairs at the Beaujon, the Hôpital St. Louis, the Hôtel Dieu, and La Charité. Afterwards, Sims was called to Brussels to operate there, before returning to Paris. These surgeries greatly enhanced Sims's reputation, and he planned on traveling to Vienna to demonstrate the procedure there, when another case from a colleague arrived in the French capital and eventually caused him to cancel his trip to Austria.

Sims returned to the US in January 1862 aboard the Great Eastern, and back in New York he favorably reported on the pavilion plan and convinced the board of the Woman's Hospital to adopt it. He then returned to Europe in July 1862, intending to return to New York for six months out of the year to earn enough to allow his family to stay in Europe. However, Sims discovered that a remunerative practice to support his family working on fistula patients in Paris was possible, and so he decided to remain in Europe until the cessation of hostilities in the USA. He simultaneously ran consulting rooms in Paris, Berlin, and London. However, according to J.C. Hallman, Sims was actually in Europe as one of several government agents of the Confederacy, who were seeking money (loans), diplomatic recognition of their new government (which never came to pass), along with supplies and ships. An intercepted letter informed Lincoln's Secretary of State William H. Seward that Sims was "secessionist in sentiment," and that his "purpose in going abroad at this time is believed to be hostile to the government," as Seward reported to U.S. diplomats in Europe. According to the U.S. Minister in Brussels Henry Shelton Sanford, Sims was a "violent secessionist," and his "movements in Europe had 'given color to (the) opinion' that he was a spy."

In 1863 Sims was reportedly summoned to treat Empress Eugénie for a fistula. This publicly helped Sims to solidify his global surgical reputation. According to Hallman, no source confirms that Eugénie had any documented medical problem at all. Sims' visits to the palace were semi-diplomatic Confederate visits, and the illness an element of subterfuge to escape the eyes of U.S. Federal diplomats, who had their eyes on Sims. Eugénie became an "ardent disciple" of the Confederacy.

In 1864 Sims moved to London from his previous base in Paris for the education of his children. He published Clinical Notes on Uterine Surgery simultaneously in English, French, and German (London, Paris, and Berlin) in 1865; this work described novel methods of treatment which were not readily adopted by the profession, but which in a few years would revolutionize the practice of gynecology. Sims remained in Europe until after the end of Civil War, in September 1868, opening an office upon his return to New York at 13 East 28th Street in Manhattan.

After the Fifteenth Amendment to the United States Constitution was passed in 1868, Sims said that it was a "dreadful mistake...to give the negro the franchise." Two years later, offering a toast on board the steamer Atlantic, returning to Europe, he said that in the aftermath of the war, the South had been degraded "beyond the level of the meanest slave that ever wore a shackle." Sims also argued that it was puerile for the South to sulk in its loss. He called for an acceptance of the outcome of the war, including the Fifteenth Amendment. "It is folly to talk of the lost cause," he said.

== Later career ==
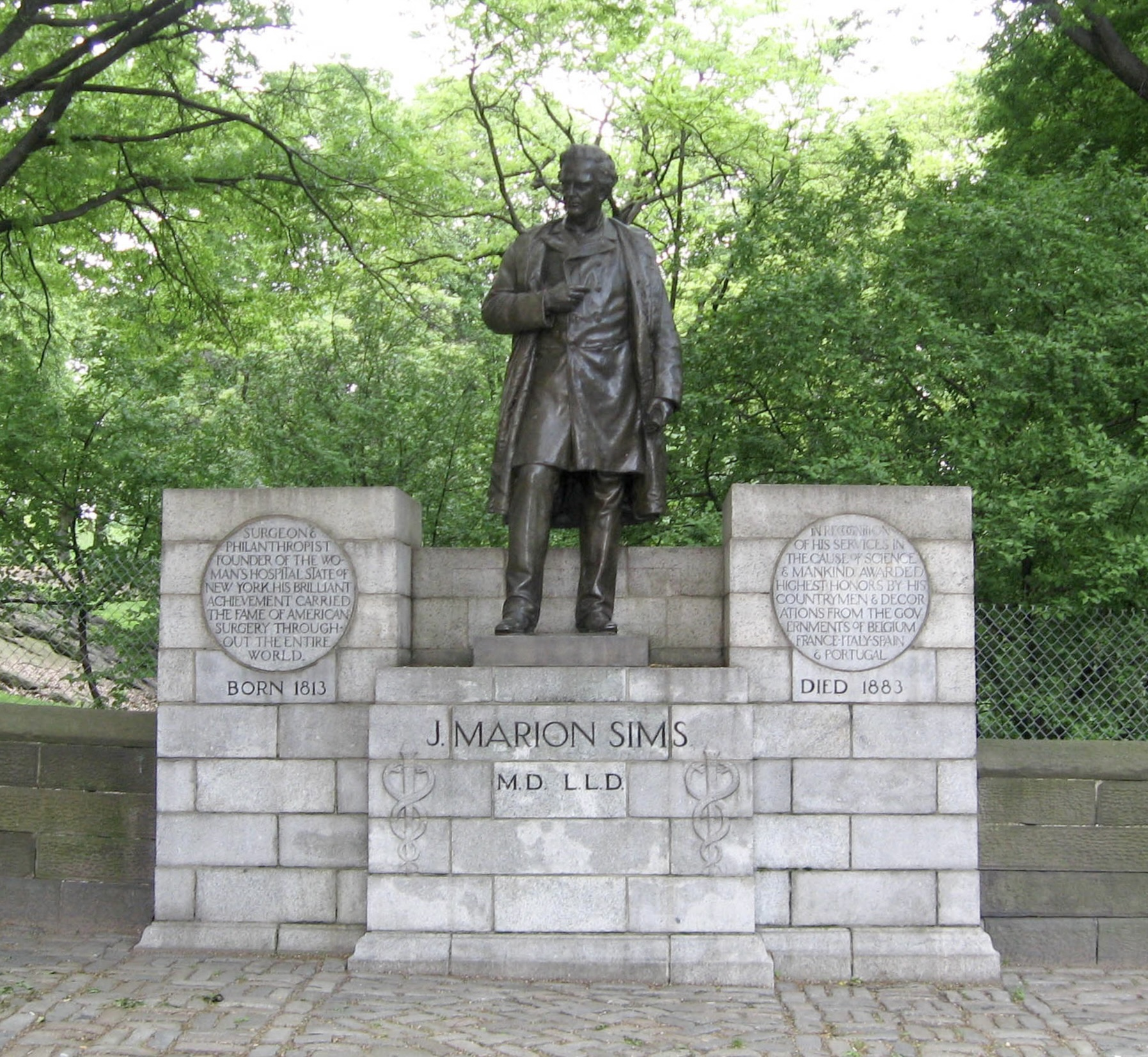
Statue of Sims in New York's Central Park, removed in April 2018.

Having treated royalty, after his return to the United States, Sims raised his fees in his private practice. He thus effectively limited it to wealthy women, although "he always had a long roll of charity patients." He became known for the Battey surgery, which contributed to his "honorable reputation". This involved the removal of both ovaries. It became a popular treatment to relieve insanity, epilepsy, hysteria (diseased uterus), and other "disorders of the nerves" (as mental illness was called at the time). At the time, these were believed to be caused by disorders of the female reproductive system.

Sims received honors and medals for his successful operations in many countries. Many of these surgeries were unnecessary and would be unacceptable in modern medical practice. He frequently performed surgery for what were considered gynecological issues: such as clitoridectomies, then believed to control hysteria or improper behavior related to sexuality. These were done at the requests of the women's husbands or fathers, who were permitted under the law to commit the women to surgery involuntarily.

Under the patronage of Napoleon III, in 1870 Sims organized the American-Anglo Ambulance Corps, which treated wounded soldiers from both sides at the Battle of Sedan.

== The first cancer hospital ==
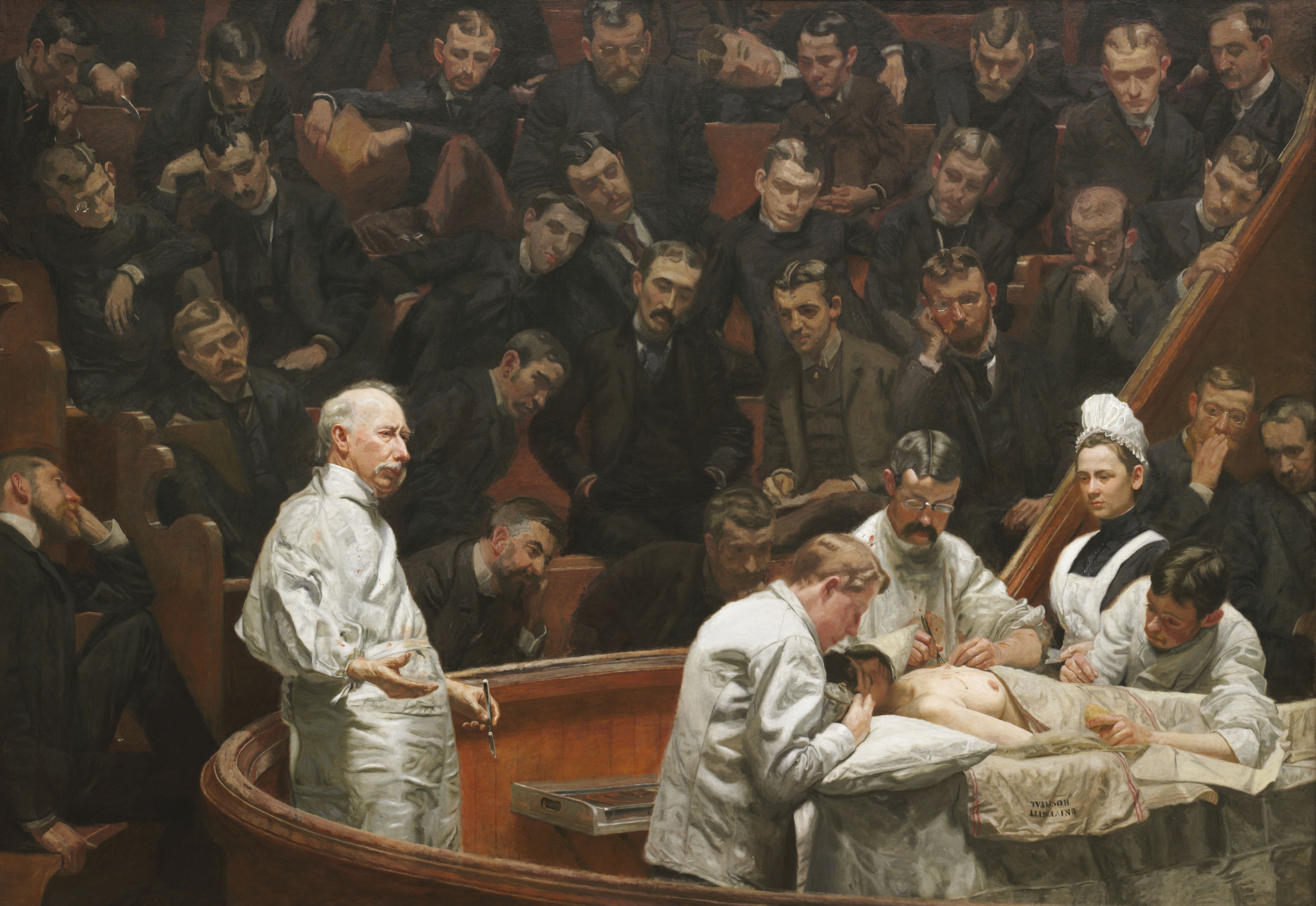
Thomas Eakins' The Agnew Clinic (1889) illustrates a typical scene inside a medical amphitheater in an American teaching hospital, in this case at the University of Pennsylvania. Sims operated frequently in such a setting at the Woman's Hospital.

In 1871, Sims returned to New York and resumed working at the Woman's Hospital, where he provided surgical treatment for women with cancer. At the time, cancer was considered to be a disease specific to the lower socioeconomic classes, and feared by some to be contagious or even sexually transmitted. In response to Sims' efforts, the highly influential Ladies' Board of the Woman's Hospital strongly argued against the treatment of cancer patients, which resulted in the hospital prohibiting the admission of cancer patients. At a meeting of the hospital's Board of Governors in 1874, Sims gave a speech rebuking the Board for refusing to treat cases of cancer even in their earliest stages. In addition, he criticized the restriction imposed by the Ladies' Board limiting the number of spectators to fifteen on operating days. Previously, as many as sixty could observe any given operation, but this had been changed because the Ladies' Board considered it an affront to a woman's modesty to have more than fifteen male surgeons observe a woman's sexual organs under treatment. Sims argued that this restriction impaired the distribution of knowledge to the many surgeons who came to New York to study gynecological diseases.

The controversial nature of Sims' speech resulted in the acceptance of his resignation by the Woman's Hospital's Board of Governors a month later. He was accused of being "reckless" and "lethal" by a member of the Board of Governors, who argued Sims should be fired for his insubordination. It predictably also brought him into conflict with some other doctors at the Woman's Hospital, with whom Sims carried on a dialogue by means of published pamphlets.

After quarreling with the board of the Woman's Hospital over the admission of cancer patients, Sims became instrumental in establishing America's first cancer institute, New York Cancer Hospital.

In reply to the treatment he received from the Woman's Hospital, Sims was unanimously elected president of the American Medical Association, an office he held from 1876 to 1877.

== Death ==
Sims suffered two angina attacks in 1877, and in 1880, contracted a severe case of typhoid fever. W. Gill Wylie, one of Sims' early twentieth-century biographers, said that although Sims suffered delirium, he was "constantly contriving instruments and conducting operations". After several months and a move to Charleston to aid his convalescence, Sims recovered in June 1881. He traveled to France. After his return to the United States in September 1881, he began to complain of an increase in heart problems.

In 1881, Sims was one of four physicians asked for an opinion about whether medical errors had contributed to the recent death of President Garfield.

According to Wylie, Sims consulted with doctors for his unknown cardiac condition both in the United States and in Europe. He was "positive that he had a serious disease of the heart and it caused deep mental depression". He was halfway through writing his autobiography and planning a return visit to Europe when he died of a heart attack on November 13, 1883, in New York City (Manhattan). He had just visited a patient with his son, H. Marion Sims. He is buried at Green-Wood Cemetery in Brooklyn, New York.

== Criticism of Sims ==
Sims' experimental surgeries on enslaved women, who could not consent, have been described since the late twentieth century as an example of systemic racism in the medical profession. This is more generally understood as part of the historical oppression of people of color and vulnerable populations in the United States. Patients of Sims' fistula and trismus nascentium operations were also not given available anesthetics, and it is generally accepted that he caused the deaths of babies on whom he operated for infantile tetanus. Rebekah Barber writes that "[due to] how they were raped and exploited as breeders, enslaved women were particularly prone to developing the [...] condition". She further notes that "the slave masters who sent the women to Sims for treatment were less concerned about their suffering than their ability to produce more slaves", a fact that may have further impacted the ability of these women to consent. She also adds that Sims operated on the racist belief that Black people had a higher pain tolerance", which is corroborated by Ojanuga, who describes how (presumably free) white women refused the procedure on account of pain.

In regards to Sims' discoveries, Durrenda Ojenunga wrote in 1993:

His fame and fortune were a result of unethical experimentation with powerless black women. Dr. Sims, "the father of gynecology", was the first doctor to perfect a successful technique for the cure of vesicovaginal fistula, yet despite his accolades, in his quest for fame and recognition, he manipulated the social institution of slavery to perform human experimentation, which by any standard is unacceptable.

Terri Kapsalis writes, in Mastering the Female Pelvis, that "Sims' fame and wealth are as indebted to slavery and racism as they are to innovation, insight, and persistence, and he has left behind a frightening legacy of medical attitudes toward and treatments of women, particularly women of color."

Drawing on Sims' published autobiography, case-histories, and correspondence, historian Stephen C. Kenny highlights how Sims' surgical treatment of enslaved infants suffering from neonatal tetanus was a typical, but tragically distinctive, feature in the career of an ambitious medical professional in the slaveowning South. Individual doctors like Sims and the profession were incentivized in multiple ways through the system of chattel slavery. Many physicians not only employed enslaved people in their practice, but also traded in enslaved people, while at the same time their medical research was advanced directly and significantly through the exploitation of the enslaved population. In a related article exploring the types, frequency and functions of slave hospitals in the American South, Kenny identifies Sims' private 'negro infirmary' located behind his office on South Perry Street in Montgomery as an example of a "hospital-for-experimentation," where Sims also undertook a series of gruelling and dangerous invasive surgeries on enslaved men. Sims used the surgical opportunities presented by long neglected chronic–and often incurable–cases of illness and injuries among the enslaved to sharpen his skills and stake a claim for professional celebrity—all in the context of the profits to be made from human trafficking one of the South's busiest slave markets.

Others, such as Harriet A. Washington and Rebekah Barber, have emphasized how "[e]ach naked, unanesthetized slave woman had to be forcibly restrained by other physicians through her shrieks of agony as Sims determinedly sliced, then sutured her genitalia" and argued that slaves were forced to hold each other down during these surgeries.

== Defense of Sims ==
In his autobiography, Sims said he was indebted to the enslaved black women on whom he experimented.

Physician and anthropologist L. Lewis Wall, writing in the Journal of Medical Ethics, has argued that fistula surgery on non-anesthetized patients would require cooperation from the patient, and would not be possible if the patient had actively resisted, though it has been noted that the use of opium could effectively prevent patients from fleeing. He suggests that surviving documentation indicates that the women were trained to assist in their own surgical procedures and that (despite some being as young as 13) the women consented to the surgeries, having been motivated by the serious medical and social nature of vesicovaginal and rectovaginal fistulas.

Wall notes that legal consent was granted by the slaves' owners; enslaved black women, he acknowledges, were a "vulnerable population" with respect to medical experimentation. However, Wall also suggests that Sims obtained consent from the women themselves, citing an 1855 passage from the New York Medical Gazette and Journal of Health, where Sims wrote:

For this purpose [...] I was fortunate in having three young healthy colored girls given to me by their owners in Alabama, I agreeing to perform no operation without the full consent of the patients, and never to perform any that would, in my judgment, jeopard life, or produce greater mischief on the injured organs—the owners agreeing to let me keep them (at my own expense) till I was thoroughly convinced whether the affection could be cured or not.

During the twenty-first century controversy over the various statues of Sims, Deirdre Cooper Owens argued that "Sims has been painted as either a monstrous butcher or a benign figure who, despite his slaveowning status, wanted to cure all women from their distinctly gendered suffering." She suggests that these opposing views are overly reductionist and that Sims' history is more nuanced. Indeed, Sims lived in a slave-holding society and expressed the racism and sexism that were considered normal during his time.

According to the Australian gynecologist and author Caroline M. de Costa,

Hideous as the accounts of his surgery may appear to sensitive 20th century eyes, undoubtedly Sims was at least partly motivated by a desire to improve the lot of his enslaved patients. In this, he was no different from many 19th century surgeons experimenting with the techniques that are the foundation of current surgical practice, gynaecological and otherwise. The lives of the slave women on whom Sims experimented would have been even more miserable without their subsequent cures, and the knowledge gained has been applied to fistula repair for thousands of women since.

According to L. Lewis Wall, "Sims's modern critics have discounted the enormous suffering experienced by fistula victims, have ignored the controversies that surrounded the introduction of anaesthesia into surgical practice in the middle of the 19th century, and have consistently misrepresented the historical record in their attacks on Sims." Wall, who has himself performed fistula surgery, portrays Sims as an ethical, caring, and successful clinician.

== Legacy and honors ==
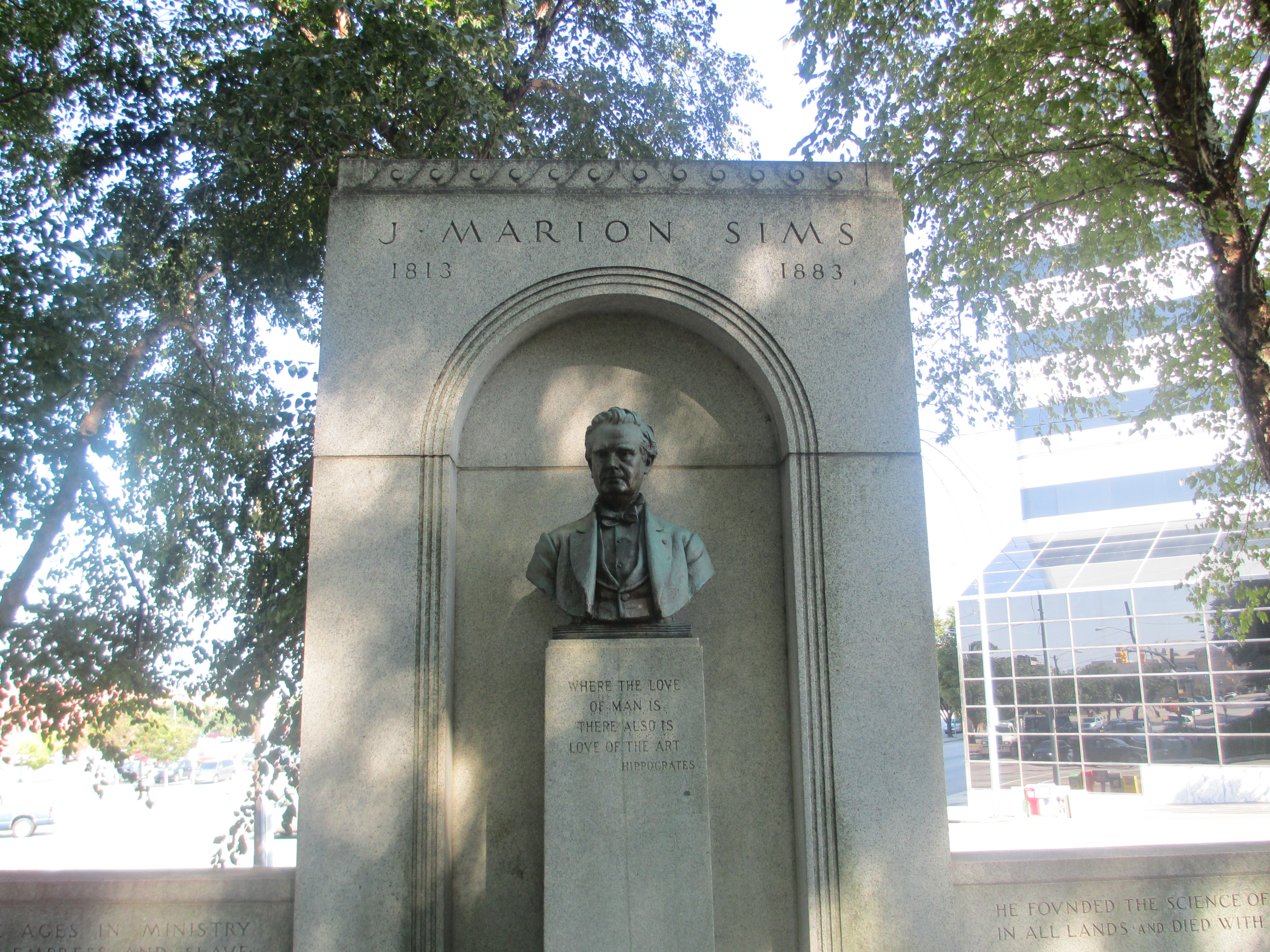
J. Marion Sims statue, South Carolina Capitol grounds, Columbia, South Carolina.

- On the title page of the reprint of an article, "History of the Discovery of Anesthesia", first published in the May 1877 number of the Virginia Medical Monthly, Sims listed his honors as:
  Author of "Silver Sutures in Surgery," "The Sims Operation for Vesico-Vaginal Fistula," "Uterine Diseases," "History of the Discovery of Anaesthesia", Etc.; Member of the Historical Society of New York; Surgeon to the Empress Eugenie; Delegate to Annual Conference of the Association for the Reform and Codification of the Law of Nations, 1879; Founder of the Woman's Hospital of the State of New York, and formerly Surgeon to the Same; Centennial President of the American Medical Association, Philadelphia, 1876; President of the International Medical Congress at Berne, 1877; Fellow of the American Medical Association; Permanent Member of the New York State Medical Society; Fellow of the Academy of Sciences, of the Academy of Medicine, of the Pathological Society, of the Neurological Society, of the County Medical Society, and of the Obstetrical Society of New York; Fellow of the American Gynaecological Association; Honorary Fellow of the State Medical Societies of Connecticut, Virginia, South Carolina, Alabama and Texas; Honorary Fellow of the Royal Academy of Medicine of Brussels; Honorary Fellow of the Obstetrical Societies of London, Dublin and Berlin, and of the Medical Society of Christiana [Oslo]; Knight of the Legion of Honor (France); Commander of Orders of Belgium, Germany, Austria, Russia, Spain, Portugal and Italy, Etc.
- A bronze statue by Ferdinand Freiherr von Miller (the younger), depicting Sims in surgical wear, was erected in Bryant Park, in midtown Manhattan, New York, in 1894, then taken down in the 1920s amid subway construction, and in 1934 was moved to the northeastern corner of Central Park, at 103rd Street, opposite the New York Academy of Medicine. The address delivered at its rededication was published in the Bulletin of the New York Academy of Medicine. This was the first statue erected in the United States in honor of any physician. The statue became the center of protests in 2017 due to Sims' operations on enslaved black women. It was defaced with the word "RACIST" and had the eyes painted red. In April 2018, the New York City Public Design Commission voted unanimously to have the statue removed from Central Park and installed in Green-Wood Cemetery in Brooklyn, near where Sims is buried. (As of 2022, it had not yet been installed there.) Nature magazine published an editorial criticizing the removal, then retracted it after reader protests.
- In November 2017, author J.C. Hallman's article about Sims' Central Park statue, "Monumental Error" appeared on the cover of Harper's Magazine. The article played a role in the broader discussion about Confederate monuments, and in a later op-ed for the Montgomery Advertiser, Hallman revealed Sims' career as a spy during the Civil War and the fraudulent history of another Sims monument in Montgomery, Alabama.
- Another memorial was installed on the grounds of his alma mater, Jefferson Medical College (now Thomas Jefferson University) in Philadelphia.
- There is a statue on the grounds of the Alabama State Capitol in Montgomery. (dedicated in 1939) In April 2018, when Silent Sam, a Confederate statue on the campus of the University of North Carolina at Chapel Hill, was doused with red ink and blood, Sims' statue had ketchup thrown on it while a skit about him was performed. "An alternative statue of Sims's 'first cure', the young woman known as Anarcha, was erected in protest only to be stolen in the night." This statue of Sims was originally intended to be one of Alabama's two statues in the National Statuary Hall Collection at the U.S. capitol.
- Another statue of Sims, installed in 1929, is at the South Carolina State House in Columbia; in 2017, the mayor of Columbia, Stephen K. Benjamin, called for its removal, as have other protestors.
- A painting by Marshall Bouldin III, entitled Medical Giants of Alabama, that depicted Sims and other white men standing over a partially clothed black patient, was commissioned for $20,000 in 1982 (paid for by donors). It was on display at the University of Alabama at Birmingham's Center for Advanced Medical Studies, but was removed in late 2005 or early 2006 because of complaints from people offended by it as well as the ethical questions associated with Sims.
- The Medical University of South Carolina, whose predecessor Sims attended, set up around 1980 an endowed chair in his honor. In February, 2018, the chair was renamed. However, a "J. Marion Sims Chair" in obstetrics and gynecology still appears in a March 2018 program. A J. Marion Sims Society, a student organization, existed there from 1923 to 1945.
- A Sims Memorial Address on Gynecology, delivered before the South Carolina Medical Society at Charleston, is documented from 1927.
- In 1950, a historical marker was erected near the site of his parents' farmhouse in Lancaster County, South Carolina, where he was born. Present at the dedication ceremony were Congressman James P. Richards and representatives of the American Medical Association, the Medical College of South Carolina, the University of South Carolina, the chairman of Lancaster's Marion Sims Memorial Hospital board, the state archivist of South Carolina, and four of Sims' children. Dr. Roderick McDonald, president of the South Carolina Medical Association, introduced the speaker, Dr. Seale Harris, past president of the Southern Medical Association and former editor of the Southern Medical Journal, whose biography of Sims, Woman's Surgeon: the Life Story of J. Marion Sims, had just been published.
- The medical college at the University of South Carolina is named Sims College in his honor; in June 2020, the university passed a resolution asking for the state to rename the college pursuant to the South Carolina Heritage Act.
- A cartoon of Sims appeared on the cover of the November 2017 issue of The Nation.
- A J. Marion Sims Foundation was founded in 1995 in his home town of Lancaster, South Carolina. It has dispensed almost $50,000,000 in grants.
- The Marion Sims Memorial Hospital is located in Lancaster.
- In Montgomery, Alabama, a historical marker at 37 South Perry St. marks the location of Sims' house and backyard hospital or infirmary. The building on the site is from the early twentieth century.
- In 1953, Sims was elected to the Alabama Hall of Fame.
- On April 3, 2018, Behind the Sheet, written by Charly Evon Simpson, was presented in New York at the Ensemble Studio Theatre. Its tagline read, "Philomena is a slave woman forced to assist her owner as he searches for a cure for fistulas. Everything changes when she becomes his patient."

== Contributions ==
- Vaginal surgery: fistula repair. Invented silver wire as a suture.
- Instrumentation: Sims' vaginal speculum; Sims' sigmoid catheter. There is a petition campaign to have Sims' name removed from the devices he invented: "Sims uterine curette, uterine sound, vaginal retractor, uterine scissors, and rectal speculum." New names would be chosen by "a committee of POC (People of Color)."
- Exam and surgical positioning: Sims' position.
- Fertility treatment: Insemination and postcoital test.
- Cancer care: Sims argued for the admission of cancer patients to the Woman's Hospital, despite contemporary beliefs that the disease was contagious.
- Abdominal surgery: Sims advocated a laparotomy to stop bleeding from bullet wounds to this area, repair the damage and drain the wound. His opinion was sought when President James Garfield was shot in an assassination attempt; Sims responded from Paris by telegram. Sims' recommendations later gained acceptance.
- Gallbladder surgery: In 1878, Sims drained a distended gallbladder and removed its stones. He published the case believing it was the first of its kind; however, a similar case had already been reported in Indianapolis in 1867.

== See also ==
- Unethical human experimentation in the United States
- List of monument and memorial controversies in the United States#J. Marion Sims (2017)
- Anarcha Westcott
- Lucy (gynecology)
- Mothers of Gynecology Movement

== Archival material ==
Papers of Dr. Sims – about 150 items – are held by the Wilson Library, University of North Carolina at Chapel Hill. The collection has been microfilmed and some is available online. A small number of letters are in the libraries of the Medical University of South Carolina and Duke University.

== Examinations of the ethical questions regarding Sims ==
- Critical of Sims
  - Axelsen, Diana E. (Fall 1985). "Women as Victims of Medical Experimentation: J. Marion Sims' Surgery on Slave Women, 1845–1850". SAGE. 2 (2): 10–13. PMID 11645827.
    - Axelsen, Diana E. (1993). "Women as Victims of Medical Experimentation: J. Marion Sims' Surgery on Slave Women, 1845–1850". In Cott, Nancy F. (ed.). History of Women in the United States: Historical Articles on Women's Lives and Activities. Vol. 11, Women's Bodies, Health and Childbirth. Berlin: K. G. Saur. pp. 93–100. doi:10.1515/9783110976328.93. ISBN 3-11-097632-3.
  - McGregor, Deborah Kuhn (1990). Sexual surgery and the origins of gynecology: J. Marion Sims, his hospital, and his patients. New York: Garland. ISBN 978-0-8240-3768-0.
  - Ojanuga, Durrenda (March 1, 1993). "The medical ethics of the 'father of gynaecology', Dr J Marion Sims" (PDF). Journal of Medical Ethics. 19 (1): 28–31. doi:10.1136/jme.19.1.28. PMC 1376165. PMID 8459435.
  - Sartin, Jeffrey S. (May 2004). "J. Marion Sims, the Father of Gynecology: Hero or Villain?". Southern Medical Journal. 97 (5): 500–505. doi:10.1097/00007611-200405000-00017. PMID 15180027. S2CID 6500614 – via Gale Academic Onefile. Comments on the article of O'Leary just cited.
  - Gonzalez, David (March 2, 2014). "Sculpture of Paradox: Doctor as Hero and Villain". The New York Times.
  - Holland, Brynn (August 29, 2017). "The 'Father of Modern Gynecology' Performed Shocking Experiments on Enslaved Women. His use of Black bodies as medical test subjects falls into a history that includes the Tuskegee syphilis experiment and Henrietta Lacks". history.com.
  - Washington., Harriet A. (September 21, 2017). "Statues that perpetuate lies should not stand". Nature. 549 (7672): 309. Bibcode:2017Natur.549..309W. doi:10.1038/549309a. PMID 28933446. S2CID 4460808.
  - Hallman, J.C. (November 2017). "Monumental Error. Will New York City finally tear down a statue?". Harper's. Vol. November 2017.
  - Savel, Richard H.; Munro, Cindy L. (January 2018). "History Is a Tangled Mess: Medical Progress, But at What Cost?". American Journal of Critical Care. 27 (1): 6–8. doi:10.4037/ajcc2018994. PMID 29292269.
  - Downes, Heidi (October 2, 2019). "The forgotten women of gynaecology". British Journal of Midwifery. 27 (10): 614–615. doi:10.12968/bjom.2019.27.10.614. S2CID 210649375. L.L. Wall responded in the same journal in 2021; cited below.
  - Cronin, Monica (November 2020). "Anarcha, Betsey, Lucy, and the women whose names were not recorded: The legacy of J Marion Sims". Anaesthesia and Intensive Care. 48 (3_suppl): 6–13. doi:10.1177/0310057X20966606. PMID 33249851. S2CID 227236696.
- Defenses of Sims
  - Moir, Chassar (December 7, 1940). "J. Marion Sims and the Vesico-Vaginal Fistula: Then and Now". British Medical Journal. 2 (4170): 773–778. doi:10.1136/bmj.2.4170.773. PMC 2179954. PMID 20783426.
  - Word, S. Buford (1972). "The Father of Gynecology". American Association for the History of Medicine. 9: 33–39.
  - Kaiser, I.H. (December 15, 1978). "Reappraisals of J. Marion Sims". American Journal of Obstetrics and Gynecology. 132 (8): 878–884. doi:10.1016/0002-9378(78)90715-9. PMID 367162.
  - Lerner, Barron J. (October 28, 2003). "Scholars Argue over Legacy of Surgeon Who Was Lionized, then Vilified". The New York Times.
  - de Costa, Caroline M. (June 2003). "James Marion Sims: some speculations and a new position" (PDF). The Medical Journal of Australia. 178 (12): 660–663. doi:10.5694/j.1326-5377.2003.tb05401.x. PMID 12797862. S2CID 77028975.
  - O'Leary, J. Patrick (May 2004). "J. Marion Sims: a defense of the father of gynecology". Southern Medical Journal. 97 (5): 427–429. doi:10.1097/00007611-200405000-00001. PMID 15180013 – via Gale Academic Onefile.
  - Wall, L. Lewis (July 2007). "Did J. Marion Sims deliberately addict his first fistula patients to opium?". Journal of the History of Medicine and Allied Sciences. 62 (3): 336–356. doi:10.1093/jhmas/jrl045. PMID 17082217.
  - Wall, L. L. (June 2006). "The medical ethics of Dr J Marion Sims: a fresh look at the historical record". Journal of Medical Ethics. 32 (6): 346–350. doi:10.1136/jme.2005.012559. ISSN 0306-6800. PMC 2563360. PMID 16731734.
  - West, M J; Irvine, L M (February 2015). "The eponymous Dr James Marion Sims MD, LLD (1813–1883)". Journal of Medical Biography. 23 (1): 35–45. doi:10.1177/0967772013480604. PMID 24585590. S2CID 10121606.
  - Petros, Peter; Abendstein, Burghard; Browning, Andrew (2018). "In defense of J Marion Sims". International Urogynecology Journal. 29 (11): 1563–1564. doi:10.1007/s00192-018-3708-1. PMID 29951910. S2CID 49475269.
  - Wall, L Lewis (March–April 2018). "J. Marion Sims and the Vesicovaginal Fistula: Historical Understanding, Medical Ethics, and Modern Political Sensibilities". Female Pelvic Medicine & Reconstructive Surgery. 24 (2): 66–75. doi:10.1097/SPV.0000000000000546. PMID 29474277. S2CID 3519992.
  - Vernon, Leonard F. (August 2019). "J. Marion Sims, MD: Why He and His Accomplishments Need to Continue to be Recognized [—] a Commentary and Historical Review". Journal of the National Medical Association. 111 (4): 436–446. doi:10.1016/j.jnma.2019.02.002. eISSN 1943-4693. ISSN 0027-9684. PMID 30851980. S2CID 73725863.
  - Wall, L. Lewis (April 2020). "The controversial Dr. J. Marion Sims (1813–1883)". International Urogynecology Journal. 31 (7): 1299–1303. doi:10.1007/s00192-020-04301-9. ISSN 0937-3462. PMID 32328679. S2CID 216076564.
  - Wall, L. Lewis (March 2, 2021). "J Marion Sims and the 'forgotten women of gynaecology'". British Journal of Midwifery. 29 (3): 172–174. doi:10.12968/bjom.2021.29.3.172. S2CID 233858519.
  - Wall, L. Lewis (March 2022). "The Damnatio Memoriae of J. Marion Sims". Pelviperineology. 41 (1): 63–72. doi:10.34057/PPj.2022.41.01.2022-1-3. S2CID 248029189 – via Gale Academic Onefile.
- Unclassified
  - Christmas, Monica (November 2021). "#SayHerName: Should Obstetrics and Gynecology Reckon with the Legacy of JM Sims?". Reproductive Sciences. 28 (11): 3282–3284. doi:10.1007/s43032-021-00567-6. PMID 33877641. S2CID 233308868.
  - Wailoo, Keith (October 16, 2018). "Historical Aspects of Race and Medicine: The Case of J. Marion Sims". Journal of the American Medical Association. 320 (15): 1529–1530. doi:10.1001/jama.2018.11944. PMID 30264160. S2CID 52880128.
  - Sayej, Nadja (April 21, 2018). "J Marion Sims: controversial statue taken down but debate still rages. New York City has removed the likeness of the 19th-century doctor and 'father of gynecology' who experimented on black women from Central Park". The Guardian.
  - Doss, Harriet E. Amos (2017). "Enslaved Women Surgical Patients of J. Marion Sims in Antebellum Alabama—Sisterhood of Shared Suffering". In Ashmore, Susan Youngblood; Dorr, Lisa Lindquist (eds.). Alabama Women: Their Lives and Times. University of Georgia Press. pp. 75–89. ISBN 978-0-8203-5077-6.
  - Spettel, S.; White, M.D. (June 2011). "The Portrayal of J. Marion Sims' Controversial Surgical Legacy". The Journal of Urology. 185 (6): 2424–2427. doi:10.1016/j.juro.2011.01.077. PMID 21511295.

== Further reading (arranged by date) ==
- Sims, J. Marion (1866). Clinical notes on uterine surgery: With Special Reference to the Management of the Sterile Condition. London: Robert Hardwicke.
- Bozeman, Nathan (1884). "History of the clamp suture of the late Dr. J. Marion Sims, and why it was abandoned by the profession". Gynecological Transactions. 9. [The link is to a reprint. The title at the beginning of the text is "The clamp suture and the range of its applicability, considered in relation to the cure of the injuries incident to parturition, with statistics."]
- Sims, J. Marion (1889). Marion-Sims, H (ed.). The Story of My Life. New York: D. Appleton & Company.
- Wilson, J. G.; Fiske, J., eds. (1900). "Sims, James Marion" . Appletons' Cyclopædia of American Biography. Vol. V. New York: D. Appleton. pp. 540–541.
- Harris, Seale; Brown, Frances Williams (1950). Woman's surgeon: the life story of J. Marion Sims. New York.
- Heaton, C E (1956). "The influence of J. Marion Sims on gynecology". Bulletin of the New York Academy of Medicine. 32 (9): 685–688. PMC 1805969. PMID 13356107.
- Speert, H. (1958). Obstetrics and Gynecologic Milestones. New York: Macmillan. pp. 442–454.
- Savitt, Todd L. (August 1982). "The Use of Blacks for Medical Experimentation and Demonstration in the Old South". Journal of Southern History. 48 (3): 331–348. doi:10.2307/2207450. JSTOR 2207450. PMID 11645888.
- Richardson, D. A. (January 1994). "Ethics in gynecologic surgical innovation". American Journal of Obstetrics and Gynecology. 170 (1 Pt 1): 1–6. doi:10.1016/s0002-9378(94)70373-6. PMID 8296808.
- Gamble, Vanessa (November 1997). "Under the Shadow of Tuskegee: African Americans and Health Care". American Journal of Public Health. 87 (11): 1773–8. doi:10.2105/AJPH.87.11.1773. PMC 1381160. PMID 9366634.
- Kapsalis, Terri (2002). "Mastering the Female Pelvis: Race and the Tools of Reproduction". In Wallace-Sanders, Kimberly (ed.). Skin Deep, Spirit Strong: The Black Female Body in American Culture. Ann Arbor, MI: University of Michigan Press. pp. 263–300. ISBN 978-0-472-06707-7.
- Schwartz, Marie Jenkins (2006). Birthing a Slave: Motherhood and Medicine in the American South.
- Spencer, Thomas (January 21, 2006). "UAB shelves divisive portrait of medical titans: Gynecologist's practices at heart of debate". Birmingham News.
- Washington, Harriet A. (2008). Medical Apartheid: The Dark History of Medical Experimentation on Black Americans from Colonial Times to the Present. Anchor. ISBN 978-0-385-50993-0.
- Kenny, Stephen C. (January 2010). "'A Dictate of Both Interest and Mercy'? Slave Hospitals in the Antebellum South". Journal of the History of Medicine and Allied Sciences. 65 (1): 1–47. doi:10.1093/jhmas/jrp019. PMID 19549698.
- Straughn Jr., J. Michael; Gandy, Roy E.; Rodning, Charles B. (July 2012). "The core competencies of James Marion Sims, MD". Annals of Surgery. 256 (1): 193–202. doi:10.1097/SLA.0b013e318249ce3b. PMID 22514000.
- Owens, Deirdre Cooper (2017). Medical Bondage: Race, Gender, and the Origins of American Gynecology.
- Kenny, Stephen C. (June 12, 2020). "J. Marion Sims statue: Questionable monument in a questionable place". Montgomery Advertiser. Montgomery, Alabama.
- Sheather, Julian (2020). "Judging history's heroes and monsters". British Medical Journal. 371 m4554. doi:10.1136/bmj.m4554. PMID 33303486. S2CID 228084537.
- Gillespie, John Jr. (Spring 2022). "Anarcha's Science of the Flesh: Towards an Afropessimist Theory of Science". Catalyst: Feminism, Theory, Technoscience. 8 (1). doi:10.28968/cftt.v8i1.35229. S2CID 248013748.

== Video ==
- Carples, Josh (2019), Remembering Anarcha (Documentary), Kirby I. Bland, Michelle Browder, LaToya Clark, Harriet E. Amos Doss, 803 Films, Carolyn Jean's Son Visions, Terrible Master Films
