= Bettina Judd =

African-American interdisciplinary writer

Bettina Judd is an African-American interdisciplinary writer, scholar, artist, and performer.

== Early life and education ==
Judd was born in Baltimore and raised in Southern California. She received her bachelor's degree in Comparative Women’s Studies and English from Spelman College in 2005, her master's degree in Women's Studies from University of Maryland in 2007, and her PhD in Women's Studies in 2014, also from the University of Maryland. Her dissertation, Feelin Feminism: Black Women's Art as Feminist Thought , is an analysis of how various oppressions that affect black women are felt, and makes the assertion that Black Women's creative process and output is a site of feminist and womanist thought. She has named her early poetic influences as: her grandmother (a poet and a mathematician for the Department of Defense), her mother, and Maya Angelou.

== Artistic and scholarly career ==
As a poet, Judd has been a Cave Canem fellow in 2007, 2008, and 2011. Her poems and other writings have been published in literary magazines, journals and anthologies including but not limited to as Torch, Meridians, and Mythium, the latter which nominated her contribution for a Pushcart Prize. Judd has received fellowships from the Five Colleges, The Vermont Studio Center, and The University of Maryland. As a singer, she has performed for audiences around the United States and the World. She is currently Assistant Professor of Gender, Women, and Sexuality Studies at the University of Washington, Seattle.

In 2013, Judd's manuscript for Patient., her first book of poems, won the 2013 Black Lawrence Press Hudson Prize. Patient. was published by Black Lawrence Press in 2014. Broadly, the collection is a poetic analysis of scientific racism and the evidence 19th century medical experimentation on black women that built the modern day practice of gynecology. Throughout the text Judd draws on her own experience with the medical industry, and the ways that she has personally experienced the dehumanization that she speaks of throughout her writing. Furthermore, she also uses her writing to draw attention to the stories of black women whose lives have been stolen through this scientific racism, such as Henrietta Lacks.

The collection alternates between the point of view and voice of a modern-day speaker, a black female researcher who finds herself confronting racist and sexist microaggressions in the face of a gynecological emergency, and the "ghost" voices of Anarcha Wescott, Joice Heth, Lucy Zimmerman, and Betsey Harris, the real life black female subjects of experimentation by J. Marion Sims, typically regarded as the father of modern-day gynecology. The collection also inhabits the voices of other historical black women who were subjected to experimentation and exploitation such as Saartjie Baartman and Henrietta Lacks. The collection was partially inspired by Judd's own experiences at a teaching hospital.

Judd has said of the themes and speakers of Patient.: "I do want to humanize these women. I wanted to tell their stories, or at the very least, allow for an audience to hear that they exist so that the next question could be: 'Well, what is their story?'....Who gets to survive and tell the stories of Black women?....A few of the women I write about are enslaved. They were meant to disappear behind the legacies of the white men who owned them. That fact, the very fact of erasure is something to be examined. So I write in “their” voices, but they sound very much like the sympathetic present day Black woman researcher who is researching them. This sympathetic researcher is understanding her story through their story. That is a tragedy, but it is a way to them, and it is a way toward her healing."

On February 16, 2016, Judd, along with historian Vanessa Gamble, were guests on an edition of NPR's Hidden Brain Podcast titled "Remembering Anarcha, Lucy, and Betsey: The Mothers of Modern Gynecology" where she read poems from Patient. and discussed its subject matter.
