= Caroline De Costa =

Professor of Obstetrics and Gynaecology

Caroline May de Costa AM (née Downes; born 1947) is an Australian medical academic. She was Professor of Obstetrics and Gynaecology at James Cook University, Queensland, Australia, as well as an advocate for indigenous health and abortion rights. She is currently Professor at The Cairns Institute (TCI). She also writes medical nonfiction books and crime novels.

== Education ==
Caroline de Costa was born in Sydney, Australia, where she began studying medicine in 1964 at the University of Sydney, before dropping out to travel after one year. She re-commenced her undergraduate medical studies in Dublin, at the Royal College of Surgeons in Ireland in 1967. Having graduated in 1973, she moved to Papua New Guinea to complete a residency in Port Moresby General Hospital, after which she returned to Ireland to undertake specialist training in obstetrics and gynaecology. She completed her Diploma with the Royal College of Obstetricians and Gynaecologists (RCOG) in 1978, became a fellow of the Royal College of Physicians and Surgeons of Glasgow in 1980, a fellow of the Royal Australian and New Zealand College of Obstetricians and Gynaecologists in 1981, and a fellow of the Royal College of Obstetricians and Gynaecologists in 1990. She obtained a master's degree in Public Health from the University of Sydney in 1995 and a PhD from the University of Sydney in 2010. Between 1980 and 1994, she practiced obstetrics and gynaecology first in Port Moresby and then in Sydney.

== Career ==
In 1994, she moved to Cairns where she continued her clinical practice until 2017. From 1994 until 2012, de Costa was part of the outreach specialist obstetric and gynaecological service established by Professor Michael Humphrey through Cairns Base Hospital, providing services throughout Far North Queensland. de Costa is the author of more than 120 research articles, and a number of textbooks. Her principal areas of research have been in reduction of foetal alcohol syndrome in children of indigenous women, vitamin D levels, requirements of pregnant women in Far North Queensland, as well as birth by caesarean section. She completed a PhD at the University of Sydney under the supervision of Dr Hans Pol researching the history of caesarean section births. Her thesis became the subject of a book, Hail Caesar: Why one in three Australian babies are born by Caesarean sections, published in 2008.

== Reproductive rights activism ==
de Costa began her work in activism for reproductive rights during her undergraduate medical studies in Ireland, including taking part in the contraceptive train in May 1971 in which members of the Irish Women's Liberation Movement took a train to Belfast, Northern Ireland, to purchase contraceptives and bring them back to Ireland. As part of her specialist training in Ireland, de Costa worked at the Irish Family Planning Association (IFPA) clinics and she notes that she "often travelled back from England with a dozen intrauterine devices discreetly concealed in my bags for IFPA doctors." In Australia, de Costa's active involvement in reproductive rights work was largely within the Royal Australian and New Zealand College of Obstetricians and Gynacologists until 2004, when she became aware of the advantages of the drug mifepristone (RU486), a drug which brings about medical abortion, and which was not available in Australia at that time, despite being available in Europe from as early as 1988 and the US since 2000. She wrote an article in the Medical Journal of Australia advocating for its introduction in Australia, noting "Availability of this drug in Australia might largely overcome many of the inequities of access to abortion, and is critical for many women in rural areas and women in some ethnic groups whose access to surgical abortion is limited."

Subsequently, she was closely involved in bringing about abortion law reform in most jurisdictions across Australia and in the overturning of the Harradine Amendment in the Federal Parliament in 2006, which enabled women's access to medical abortion using mifepristone.

2026 saw the 20 year anniversary of the passage of the legislation that overturned the Harradine Amendment, which made medical abortion available to Australian women. de Costa was invited by the Medical Journal of Australia to write about the progress that has been made since this momentous decision by the Federal parliament. Notably, as of 2026, it was recorded that more than half a million women have used medical abortion since it became available.

de Costa has also advocated for gender equality in research and medical practice, and has published in MJA Insight+ with Professor Nicholas Fisk, highlighting the need to discard terms such as "Bikini medicine" and "Beyond Bikini Medicine'.

== Awards and recognition ==
- President's Medal of the Australian Medical Association, 2010
- President's Medal of the Royal Australian and New Zealand College of Obstetricians and Gynaecologists, 2014
- Member of the Order of Australia (AM), 2014, "for significant service to medicine, particularly to Indigenous and migrant women's reproductive health"
- Gold Medal of the Australian Medical Association, 2024

In January 2021, de Costa handed back her AM to the Governor General in protest of Margaret Court, an "internationally acclaimed" former world champion tennis player but now a Christian minister, being advanced to a Companion of the Order of Australia (AC) in the 2021 Australia Day Honours.

== Works ==
=== Medical nonfiction ===
- De Costa, Caroline (1990). Tying the tubes : a guide for Australian women considering sterilisation. Sydney: Hale & Iremonger. ISBN 978-0-86806-383-6. OCLC 27575103.
- De Costa, Caroline (2003). Dick : a guide to the penis for men and women. Moore, Michele C. Crows Nest, N.S.W.: Allen & Unwin. ISBN 978-1-74114-156-6. OCLC 156039605.
- Moore, Michele.; De Costa, Caroline (2003). Cesarean section : understanding and celebrating your baby's birth. Baltimore: The Johns Hopkins University Press. ISBN 978-0-8018-7336-2. OCLC 50478435.
- Moore, Michele.; De Costa, Caroline (2006). Pregnancy and parenting after thirty-five : mid life, new life. Baltimore, Md.: Johns Hopkins University Press. ISBN 978-0-8018-8914-1. OCLC 232160442.
- De Costa, Caroline; Howat, Paul. (2007). Clinical cases in obstetrics, gynaecology and women's health. North Ryde, N.S.W.: McGraw-Hill Australia. ISBN 978-0-07-471640-3. OCLC 224825662.
- De Costa, Caroline (2007). RU 486. Salisbury, Qld.: Boolarong Press. ISBN 978-1-921054-33-4. OCLC 191045830.
- De Costa, Caroline (2008). Hail Caesar : why one in three Australian babies is born by caesarean section. Salisbury, Qld.: Boolarong Press. ISBN 978-1-921054-28-0. OCLC 271856915.

=== Fiction ===
==== Stand-alone ====
- De Costa, Caroline (2022). The clone kid : an allegory. ISBN 978-1-922643-22-3. OCLC 1309918729.

==== Cass Diamond series ====
- de Costa, Caroline (2015). Double Madness. Witchcliffe Western Australia: Boolarong Press. ISBN 978-0-9943167-2-1. OCLC 926040007.
- de Costa, Caroline (2018). Missing Pieces. Melbourne, VIC: Boolarong Press. ISBN 978-0-6482159-9-8. OCLC 1041112029.
- de Costa, Caroline (2019). Blood Sisters. ISBN 978-0-6480663-8-5. OCLC 1048935432.
- de Costa, Caroline (2023). Buried Secrets. Brisbane. Boolarong Press. ISBN 978-1-922643-68-1
- de Costa, Caroline (2021). Hidden Lives. Brisbane. Boolarong Press.] ISBN 978-1-925877-85-4
- de Costa, Caroline (2025). The Rosemary. Brisbane. Boolarong Press. ISBN 9781923321144.

Biography

- de Costa, Caroline and Miller, Francesca (2010). The Diva and Doctor God. Xlibris. ISBN 978-1-4535-7966-4
- de Costa, Caroline and Miller, Francesca (2013). Sarah Bernhardt et le Docteur Pozzi (French version) ISBN 978-2-35815-100-9
- de Costa, Caroline (2021) The Women's Doc. Allen & Unwin. ISBN 978-1-76052-914-7
- de Costa, Caroline (2025) Sarah Bernhardt and Dr Pozzi: Letters of Love and Friendship. Glyphe. ISBN 978-2-35815-353-9. The republication of the text in English by Glyphe was to mark the exhibition "Sargent and Paris" at Musee D'orsay in 2025, in which the renowned Sargent portrait of Dr Pozzi was exhibited for the first time publicly in France.
