= Statue of J. Marion Sims =

Bronze sculpture in New York City

J. Marion Sims
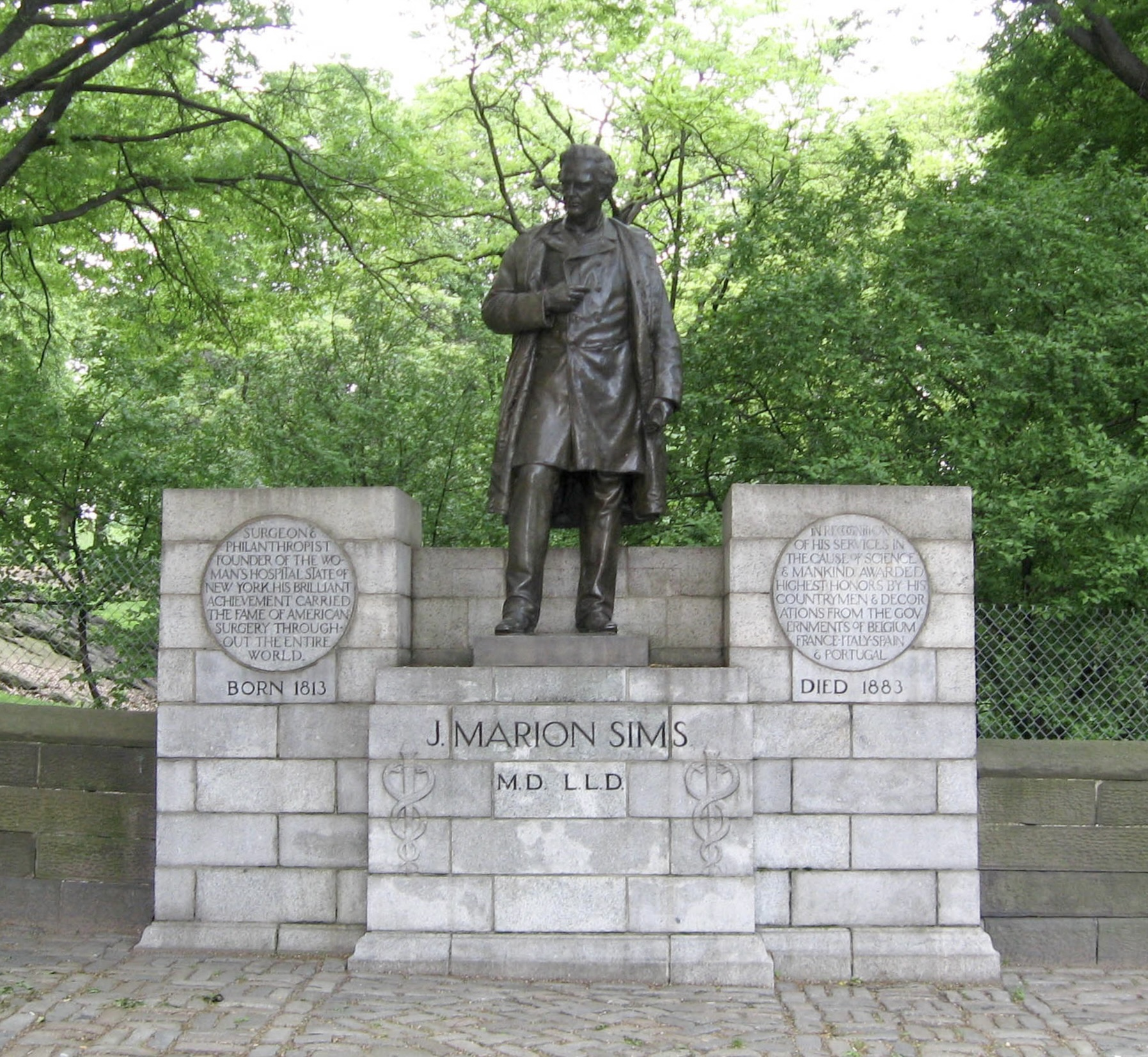
- The statue in Central Park in 2008
- Medium: Bronze sculpture
- Subject: J. Marion Sims
- Location: 40°47.546′N 73°57.161′W

J. Marion Sims is a bronze sculpture depicting the American physician of the same name by Ferdinand Freiherr von Miller.

== Description ==
The sculpture consists of a nearly 9-foot-tall image of a standing Sims upon a plinth resting on a pedestal, and supporting piers on either side with roundels containing descriptions. The figure of Sims is cast in bronze, and the other elements of the sculpture are granite from North Jay, Maine.

== History ==
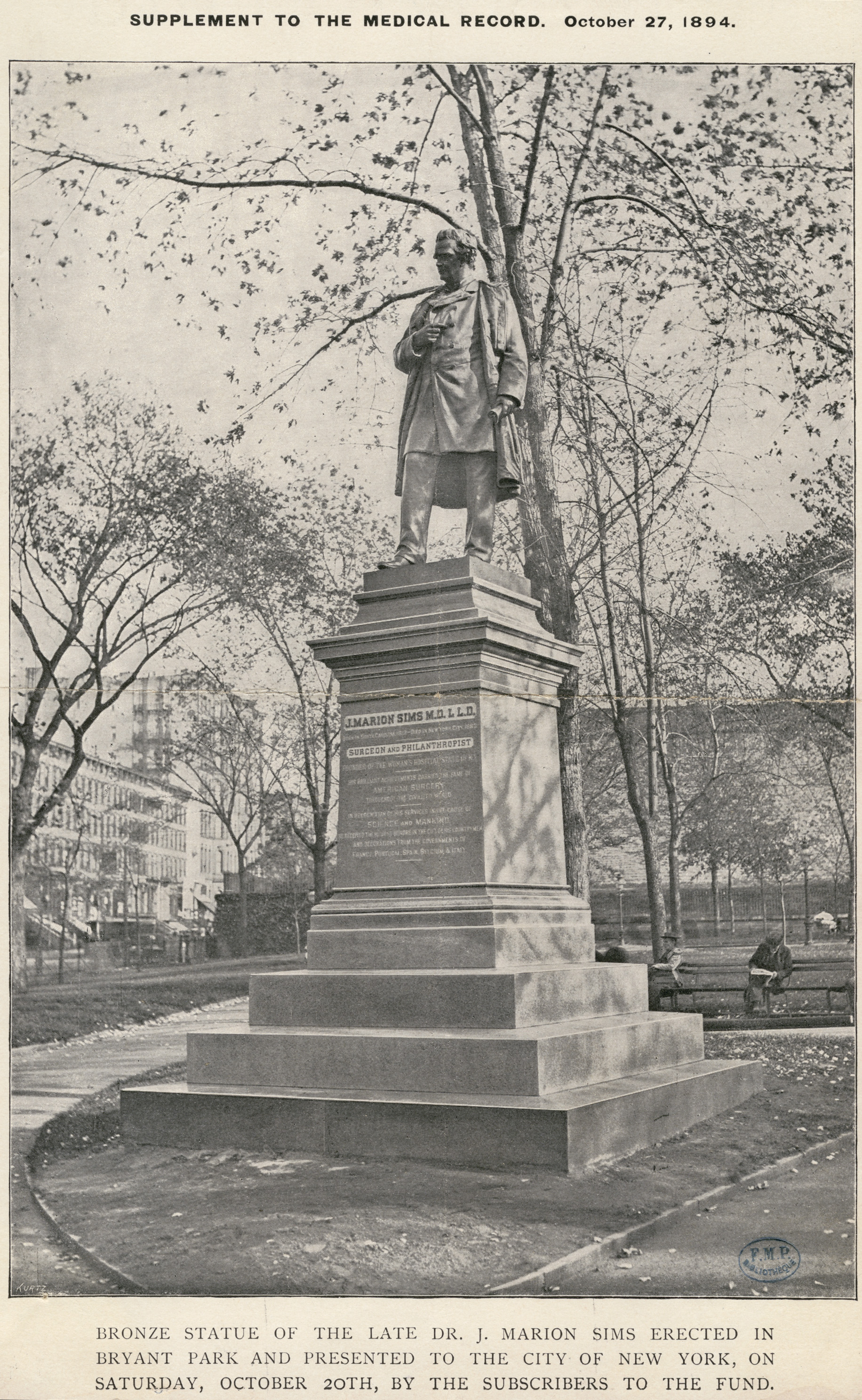
The statue in Bryant Park

The statue was cast in Munich, Germany, in 1892 and was dedicated on October 20, 1894. Originally erected in Bryant Park in 1894, it was taken down in the 1920s amid subway construction, and moved to the northeastern corner of Central Park, at 103rd Street, in 1934, opposite the New York Academy of Medicine.

This statue became a cause of controversy in 2017 due to Sims' experimental operations on enslaved black women. In August of that year, the statue was vandalized, with someone writing the word "racist" on it in spray paint. Activists' push to remove the statue intensified following the publication of the book Medical Apartheid. In April 2018, the New York City Public Design Commission voted unanimously to have the statue removed from Central Park and installed in Green-Wood Cemetery, near where Sims is buried. The following day, the statue was moved to Green-Wood, where it was temporarily placed in storage. The pedestal or supporting piers remain at Central Park. The cemetery plans to place the statue near Sims' gravesite once a historical display on Sims' life is created.

== See also ==
- 1894 in art
