= Anarcha Westcott =

African-American enslaved woman and surgical subject

Anarcha Westcott (c. 1828 – June 27, 1869) was an American enslaved woman who is known as the "Mother of Modern Gynaecology" for having undergone a series of experimental surgical procedures conducted by medical doctor J. Marion Sims, without the use of anesthesia, in order to develop treatments for vesicovaginal fistula and rectovaginal fistula resulting from traumatic childbirth, primarily aimed at benefitting white female patients. Sims's medical experimentation on Anarcha and other enslaved women, and its role in the development of modern gynaecology, has generated controversy among medical historians, particularly because enslaved women did not have the right to refuse involvement.

== Background ==
For many years, little was known about Anarcha, and the only source of her existence was Sims's writings; as she was illiterate (by law), most information came from Sims' records of his experiments. She first appears in the autobiography of J. Marion Sims as a "little mulatto girl" living in the doctor's house in Mount Meigs, Alabama, who is told by a Dr. Lucas treating Sims for malaria to gather supplies so he can perform bloodletting on Sims.

Anarcha next turns up as "a young colored woman, about seventeen years of age, well developed" belonging to a Mr. Wescott [sic], who lived a mile from Sims' house, at that time in Montgomery, Alabama. Sims was called in to assist after her labor lasted three days. Whereas Anarcha's "colleague" Betsey, on whom Sims would operate for a similar problem, had "married last year", no source comments on how Anarcha became pregnant.

== Experimental surgery ==
After the stillbirth, Anarcha was brought back to Sims because she had several unhealed tears in her vagina and rectum – a vesicovaginal fistula and rectovaginal fistula. These tears meant she had no control over her urine or feces, which caused her to have excruciating pain from her uncontrollable bowel and urine movements flowing through her open wounds. Being unable to control her urine and feces led to infections, inflamed tissue, and odor.

Sims performed 30 experimental operations with opium as anaesthesia on Anarcha before successfully closing the fistula and tears. During the procedures, Anarcha was given opium as analgesia. While opium was a common pain management tool in the 19th century, people also often had access to other forms of early anesthesia (such as ether or chloroform) during medical procedures. Some people argue that Sims, as a physician, could have chosen to use anesthesia, but that he intentionally chose not to for his experiments on enslaved Black women like Anarcha. The experimental procedures that Sims performed on Anarcha and other enslaved people revolutionized gynecological surgery; the technique Sims developed became the first ever treatment for vesicovaginal fistulae.

On December 21, 1856, Anarcha, age 32, was admitted to Sims' Woman's Hospital in New York, with the notation that she stayed about a month and was discharged in January 1857 as cured. Her enslaver was William Lewis Maury, U.S. Navy, Caroline County, Virginia. The circumstances of her trip to New York are unknown.

A tombstone for an "Annacay", wife of Lorenzo Jackson, was found by chance in King George County, Virginia (adjacent to Caroline County). In the 1870 Census, her name is spelled Anaky Jackson, and on her death record, Ankey. The death date on the Vital Statistics does not match that on her tombstone (1869/70). Filmmaker Carples concludes that all of these are the same Anarcha that Sims treated in Alabama. If she was 32 in 1856, she was born in 1824, and pregnant at 13 when she first was treated by Sims.

== Remembrance ==
In 2015, author J.C. Hallman became obsessed with finding Anarcha. He published articles about Sims and Anarcha in Harper's Magazine, the Montgomery Advertiser, and The Baffler, and his work to discover Anarcha's final resting place is featured in Josh Carples' documentary film Remembering Anarcha. Hallman's book was published in 2023 as Say Anarcha: A Young Woman, a Devious Surgeon, and the Harrowing Birth of Modern Women's Health.

Say Anarcha went on to be praised by The New York Times as "a truly astounding tale...compelling and well-researched" and "an important book [that] deserves to be read widely." The Brooklyn Rail called the book "an instant classic" and "a new masterpiece" and noted that "Hallman had done what no scholar had previously succeeded in doing, namely unearthing information about Anarcha independent of Sims's tendentious accounts of her life." Publishers Weekly praised the book in a starred review as "innovative and riveting...a must-read," and Booklist, also a starred review, called the book "commanding and affecting...and grimly relevant."

One of the principal discoveries in Say Anarcha was that Anarcha never took the name "Anarcha Westcott." She died with the surname Jackson, and the name on her gravestone, in Virginia, is "Annacay Jackson."

Hallman has also located the living descendants of Anarcha and her husband, Lorenzo. Efforts are underway to ensure that her gravesite is properly protected and memorialized. Anarcha's descendants include the president of Dillard University, Dr. Rochelle Ford.

A small statue of Anarcha Westcott was erected by protestors near the statue of Sims on the grounds of the Alabama State Capitol. It was quickly stolen.

Feminist hardcore punk band War on Women wrote a song called "Anarcha" on their 2018 album "Capture the Flag", honouring Anarcha Westcott. It denounces the actions of Sims and their impact on Anarcha and the other two named women he is known to have experimented on, as well as the more general context of men imposing their will on the bodies of women, as a way of remembering all the other women who suffered similar fates and whose names were ignored and forgotten at the time.

In 2021, artist Michelle Browder toured the country raising funds and asking for donations of discarded metal objects, which she would weld to construct a 15-foot memorial to Anarcha Westcott and two other women (Betsey and Lucy) who were experimented on by Sims. The work, the Mothers of Gynecology Monument, was completed in San Francisco and the sculpture was erected in Montgomery, Alabama, as part of a wider campus project to bring awareness to the Mothers of Gynecology Movement.

In 2024, I Be Black Girl, described in local media as Nebraska’s only reproductive justice organization, opened the Anarcha Center in North Omaha, naming the community hub in Anarcha’s honor. Located at 2306 North 24th Street, the center was created as a permanent home for the organization’s programming and as a gathering space for cultural events, shared learning, wellness, and community care. I Be Black Girl described the center as a way to honor Anarcha, along with Betsey Harris and Lucy Zimmerman, by connecting their histories to ongoing work addressing Black maternal health, birth outcomes, and community wellbeing, while also creating space to imagine what could have been possible for Anarcha’s life and the lives of others.

== Media ==
- Hallman, J.C. (June 6, 2023). Say Anarcha: A Young Woman, a Devious Surgeon, and the Harrowing Birth of Modern Women's Health.
- Vedantam, Shankar (February 16, 2016). "Remembering Anarcha, Lucy, and Betsey: The Mothers of Modern Gynecology". Hidden Brain. National Public Radio.
- Thom, Robert, Illustration of Dr. J. Marion Sims with Anarcha
- "Behind the Sheet", by Charly Evon Simpson, "reframes modern gynecology's origin story, demonstrating how these women supported one another through suffering, and challenges the dominant historical narrative that centers Sims."
- Outdoor painting of Anarcha, Lucy and Betsey in downtown Montgomery. Artist?

== Poetry ==
- Godley, Joanne (2021). "A Herstory of Pain". Massachusetts Review. 62 (1): 33–42. doi:10.1353/mar.2021.0006. S2CID 234141629.
- Christina, Dominique (2018). Anarcha Speaks : A History in Poems. Beacon Press. ISBN 9780807009215.
- Maples, Kwoya Fagin (2018). Mend : poems. Lexington, Kentucky: University Press of Kentucky. ISBN 9780813176284.
- Judd, Bettina (2014). Patients : poems. Black Lawrence Press. ISBN 9781625579232.
- Judd, Bettina (2013). "The Researcher Discovers Anarcha, Betsey, Lucy". Meridians: Feminism, Race, Transnationalism. 11 (2): 238–239 – via Project MUSE.
- Jarrett, T. J. (2014). "Anarcha: J. Marion Sims Opens My Body for the Thirty-First Time". Virginia Quarterly Review. 90 (3): 52 – via Project MUSE.

== See also ==
- List of enslaved people
- List of monuments to African Americans
- Slavery in the United States
