= J. C. Hallman =

American author

J.C. Hallman
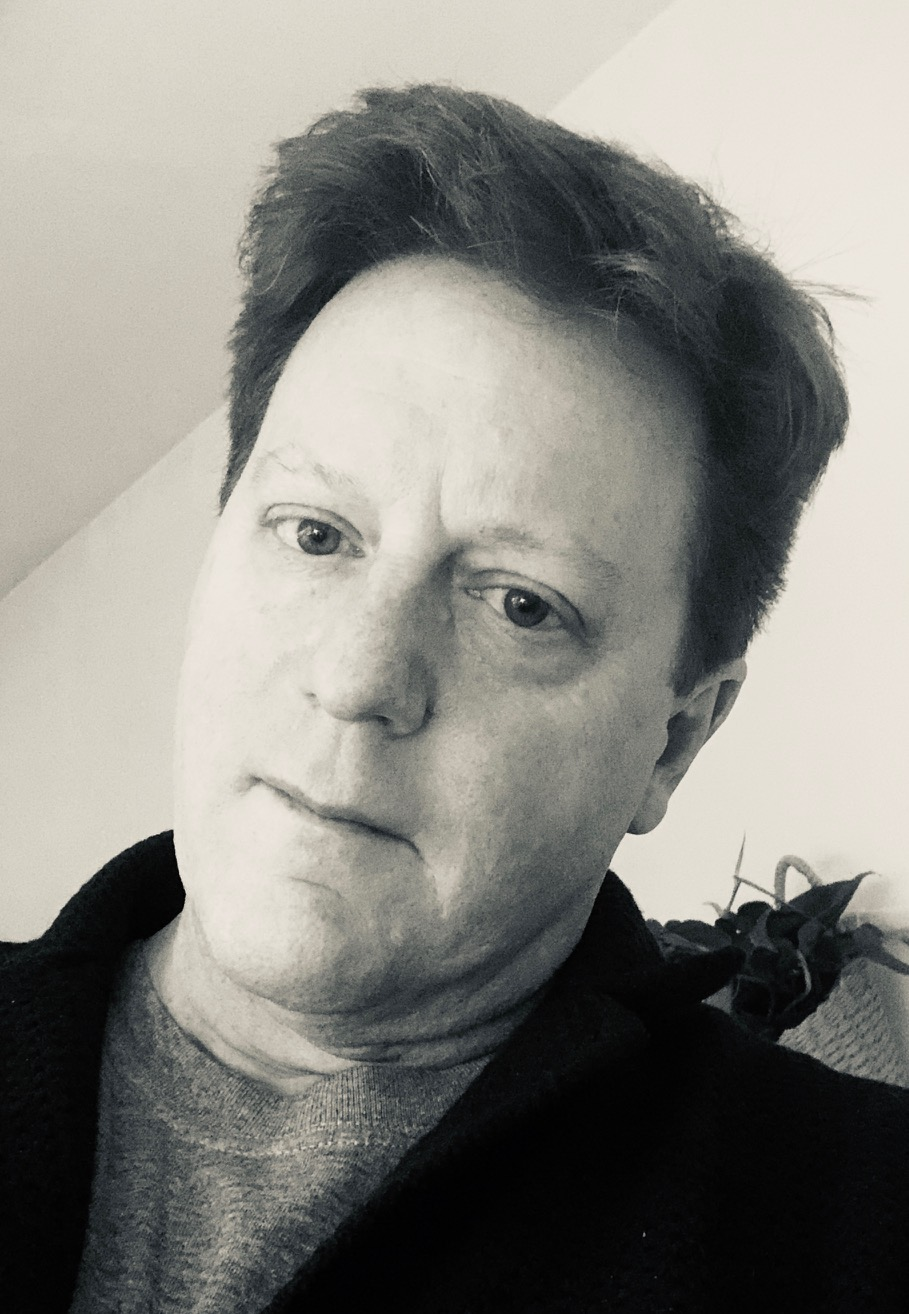
- Born: 1967 (age 58–59)
- Education: Iowa Writers' Workshop; Johns Hopkins
- Occupations: Essayist; Author
- Writing career
- Genres: Non-fiction; Fiction
- Notable work: "B & Me" "SayAnarcha"
- Notable awards: National Endowment for the Arts Fellowship (2024) Guggeinheim Fellowship (2013)
- Website: JCHallman.com

J.C. Hallman (born 1967) is an American author, journalist, essayist, and researcher. His work has been widely published in Harper's, GQ, The Baffler, Tin House Magazine, The New Republic, and elsewhere. He is the author of six books, and his nonfiction combines memoir, history, journalism, and travelogue, including the highly acclaimed B & Me: A True Story of Literary Arousal, a book about love, literature, and modern life.

== Early life and career ==
Hallman grew up in Southern California and studied creative writing at the University of Pittsburgh, the Iowa Writers’ Workshop, and Johns Hopkins University. In the mid-1990s, Hallman worked as a table games dealer in Atlantic City for five years, during a period when the city was experiencing an increase in suicides, including a close friend of Hallman's. This incident is detailed in his 2015 Harper's essay "Getting to the End." Hallman currently works as an investigative journalist with Oklahoma Watch, an independent news source in Oklahoma City.

== Say Anarcha: A Young Woman, a Devious Surgeon, and the Harrowing Birth of Modern Women's Health ==
In 2017, NYC Mayor Bill de Blasio launched a commission to evaluate controversial monuments in the city, including the statue of controversial surgeon J. Marion Sims, in Central Park. During the 90 day evaluation period, Hallman's essay about the Sims monument, "Monumental Error," appeared on the cover of Harper's Magazine, and was published during the time the Public Design Commission held public forums for the evaluation of these monuments. The piece contributed to the greater, nationwide debate about the role of Confederate monuments. The article was distributed to the entire commission. The Sims statue was voted out by unanimous decision and removed in April 2018.

Hallman is publishing a book about the young enslaved woman who was Sims's first experimental subject, Anarcha Westcott. He was prompted to explore her life after finding the first evidence of Westcott's existence that did not come from Sims's own writings. Hallman was quoted in The Guardian about the removal of the statue, saying "It's the first time, and hopefully not the last, that a statue in New York City was removed explicitly because of questions about the content of the monument."

After the statue's removal, Hallman published several op-eds detailing Sims's career as a spy in Paris, and shared the story of another controversial statue of Sims in Montgomery, Alabama. He published a piece with the African American Policy Forum about the lukewarm attention that medical organizations gave to the Sims legacy, despite Sims's impact on vaccine hesitancy in the African American community during the COVID-19 pandemic.

Hallman was interviewed about his work in uncovering the details of Anarcha's life and death by filmmaker Josh Carples in the documentary Remembering Anarcha, which was an official selection of the San Francisco Black Film Festival in 2020. Hallman linked Sims’ experimentations on young black women to the ongoing health crisis in Africa regarding the treatment of obstetric fistula, a condition that results from complications during childbirth, in a piece about Alice Emasu, founder of the Terrewode Women's Community Hospital, for The Baffler. Up until recently, Sims has been regularly lauded as the father of gynecology and had worked to repair fistulas, though Hallman uncovered his radical experimentations on enslaved men and women to read "like snippets lifted from the pages of a horror story," questioning Sims's altruism due to his feelings of disgust at diseases of the female pelvic region. Rather, Hallman notes, Sims was motivated by a chance at immortalizing himself in the annals of medical history.

Say Anarcha: A Young Woman, a Devious Surgeon, and the Harrowing Birth of Modern Women's Health was published in June 2023, and was widely praised. The New York Times called the book "a truly astounding tale...compelling and well-researched" and "an important book [that] deserves to be read widely." The Brooklyn Rail called the book "an instant classic" and "a new masterpiece" and noted that "Hallman had done what no scholar had previously succeeded in doing, namely unearthing information about Anarcha independent of Sims's tendentious accounts of her life." Publishers Weekly praised the book in a starred review as "innovative and riveting...a must-read," and Booklist, also a starred review, called the book "commanding and affecting...and grimly relevant."

Say Anarcha reveals Anarcha's final resting place, a marked grave in a remote Virginia forest. After completing the book, Hallman began a search for descendants of Anarcha and her husband, Lorenzo. He succeeded in locating living family members, who have since visited the gravesite. Work is ongoing to ensure that the gravesite is properly protected and memorialized.

== Critical Reception and Press ==
=== The Chess Artist: Genius, Obsession, and the World's Oldest Game ===
To research The Chess Artist, which details the story of his friendship with Glenn Umstead, Hallman visited Elista, Kalmykia to interview Kirsan Ilyumzhinov, first president of Kalmykia and president of FIDE from 1995 to 2018, about chess. The book was described in The Boston Globe as "vivid journeys through the territories of friendship, passion for a game, and chess history and described in The Arizona Republic as "a chess book like no other, irreverent, insightful, and funny."

=== The Devil is a Gentleman: Exploring America's Religious Fringe ===
For The Devil is a Gentleman, a book about the nature of fringe religions, Hallman was interviewed by Jennifer Shahade of Bookslut about his participation in belief systems that he's sure he won't adhere to. "You can't understand a system or a belief by standing outside of it," he said. "You have to go in and participate. I didn't want to become an apologist for any of these groups, but I did want to spend at least a little time in each one trying to understand them the way they understand themselves." The book was described as providing "the best summary of persons of the Trinity I have ever encountered" by Stephen Prothero in The New York Times. The San Francisco Chronicle called Hallman's chapter about the Texan Christian Wrestling Federation "a small masterpiece of first-person reportage."

=== In Utopia: Six Kinds of Eden and the Search for a Better Paradise ===
In 2010, Hallman spoke with famed literary critic Parul Sehgal for Publishers Weekly about his nonfiction travelogue which explores modern-day utopians, which was described as "funnier, wiser, sadder, and, surprisingly, more hopeful than Thomas More's misunderstood classic," by writer Jeff Sharlet. The Utne Reader states that in the conclusion of the book, Hallman says that is "the very idea of utopia that is importance even when it doesn't work in practice." Hallman told "The Book Show" of the Australian Broadcasting Corporation that "utopian literature...puts something onto the map of the imagination, makes something seem possible imaginatively, before anybody steps in and tries to take the next step out of actually proposing something."

=== The Hospital for Bad Poets: Stories ===
Hallman's first short story collection, The Hospital for Bad Poets, was released in 2009 by Milkweed Editions. In The New York Times, Hallman was described as one who "reconfigures our everyday errors and flaws into deeply affecting fiction...[he] is wonderfully bright." In an interview with Ron Hogan of beatrice.com, Hallman said, "The only thing I set out to do was create, or recreate, something which had pleased me." In The LA Times, author and critic Steve Almond stated that "like Kafka before him, [Hallman is] on the make for the sturdy truths in an era of spiritual dislocation."

=== Wm & H’ry: Literature, Love, and the Letters of William and Henry James ===
Wm & Henry is Hallman's fifth book which details the brotherhood of William and Henry James. Hallman told The Believer, "The book hopes to appeal to readers with promiscuous imaginations, as opposed to pleading with philosophers and artists to please buy this book because there's a little bit about art and philosophy in here."

=== B & Me: A True Story of Literary Arousal ===
Hallman's book B & Me was called "a fascinating thing to behold: literary criticism that's deeply personal, hysterically funny, and starkly honest" by Jeff Turrentine at The Washington Post and in the San Francisco Chronicle, Joseph Peschel claimed he "fell in love" with Hallman's book. Hallman told Interview Magazine that "we can be brazen, outrageous, or explicit in books when in our regular lives we are not. That's exactly what books should do" and in 2015, Hallman was invited to discuss B & Me on C-Span's BookTV. B & Me was also translated into Chinese and He Zhihe at Line Today reviewed the book, stating "Hallman's intention break[s] the genre with creativity; … [it] deliberately breaks the boundaries of genres."

=== The Story About the Story I and The Story About the Story II ===
The Story about the Story anthologies contain 56 critical essays collected by J.C. Hallman as editor. The Story About the Story I was hailed by The LA Times as "nothing less than a crash course in literature, as taught by some serious talent."

== Other Notable Pieces ==
- Becky Hungry Coyote, included in Lee Montgomery's Woof! Writers on Dogs
- The Demolition Derby and Small Town Politics, Pacific Standard Magazine
- Mr. Sloan Went to Washington, The New Republic (See also: 2020 Democratic Party Presidential Primaries)
- The Shock of the Crazed, The Baffler
- Minneapolis in the Aftermath, The New Republic
- Game Theories, The Baffler

== Awards ==
Hallman received a McKnight Artist Fellowship in fiction in 2010, and the John Simon Guggenheim Foundation in the general non-fiction category in 2013. Hallman also won a Pushcart Prize in 2009 for this short story, "Ethan: A Love Story," first published in Tin House Magazine. His essay, "A House is a Machine to Live In," was featured in the 2010 Best American Travel Writing, edited by Bill Buford, which features the residential cruise ship, MS The World.

In 2024, Hallman received a National Endowment for the Arts fellowship for his work on "Say Anarcha."

== Bibliography ==
- The Chess Artist (2003), tells the story of Hallman's friendship with chess player Glenn Umstead. Hallman and Umstead traveled to Kalmykia, in the Russian Federation. Hallman interviewed chess player and murderer, Claude Bloodgood and then-FIDE president, and possible murderer, Kirsan Ilyumzhinov.
- The Devil is a Gentleman, (2006) examines modern American religions, including Scientology, the Church of Satan and the Monks of New Skete. The book also considers the life and work of philosopher and religious scholar, William James. Hallman also published an op-ed in the Boston Globe about the 100th anniversary of William James's essay, "The Moral Equivalent of War."
- The Hospital for Bad Poets (2009) is a collection of short stories.
- In Utopia explores (2010) explores the history of utopian literature and visits six modern utopias, including the oldest intentional community in the United States, Twin Oaks, and the world's first residential cruise ship, The World.
- Wm & H’ry (2013) is the story of the brotherhood of William and Henry James, told through an examination of their voluminous correspondence. Hallman contends that the James letters are the most influential correspondence in history.
- B & Me (2015) is a memoir about love, reading, and the work of Nicholson Baker. It is an example of "creative criticism," which Hallman has championed in two edited anthologies, The Story About the Story (2009) and The Story About the Story II (2013).

== See also ==
- Anarcha Westcott
- Kirsan Ilyumzhinov
- List of Guggenheim Fellowships awarded in 2013
- Kelly Writers House
- Removal of Confederate monuments and memorials
- The Satanic Bible
- Eve Shelnutt

== Relevant Links ==
- J.C. Hallman Website
- "Monumental Error" Harper's Article
