= Lucy (gynecology) =

African-American enslaved woman and surgical subject

Lucy was an enslaved woman from Macon County, Alabama, who became one of the first subjects of experimental gynecological surgery performed by physician J. Marion Sims in the mid-19th century. After developing a vesicovaginal fistula following a traumatic childbirth, she was treated alongside two other enslaved women, Anarcha and Betsey. These women are recognized for their contributions to modern gynecology.

== Early life and background ==
As of current, there is limited information about Lucy's date of birth and familial background due to the lack of documented records of enslaved individuals. Although Lucy was the first patient in Sim's experimental fistula surgeries, these procedures took place in Montgomery, Alabama, where Sims had relocated around 1845.

Lucy was described as an adolescent in Sim's autobiography, leading many historians to estimate she was approximately seventeen to eighteen years old at the time. After developing a fistula following childbirth, she was initially considered incurable by Sims. As her condition worsened, she was brought to Sims by her enslaver, Tom Zimmerman. Historians note that enslaved women were often subjected to medical treatment for economic reasons, including their ability to perform labor.

== Experimental surgeries ==
Lucy was among the early patients treated during the development of Sim's surgical techniques, although sources differ regarding the sequence of his initial operations.

Sims described Lucy's condition in his writings, and she remained in his care in a hospital behind his home. After examining a white woman with a similar injury, reportedly from a horseback riding accident, Sims began pursuing a surgical approach to treating vesicovaginal fistulas, leading to experimental procedures on Lucy.

Sims performed surgery on Lucy in the presence of other physicians. He placed her in a knee-chest position and used a bent pewter spoon to improve the visibility of the fistula, a method that contributed to the development of the vaginal speculum. Lucy underwent multiple operations and experienced severe complications following the first procedure, when a sponge was left inside of her bladder, causing sepsis. These procedures were performed prior to the widespread use of anesthesia, although historians have examined how race and enslavement influenced medical treatment and perceptions of pain in the 19th century. These experimental procedures contributed to the foundation of modern surgical treatments for vesicovaginal fistulas, while also raising ongoing ethical concerns about consent and medical exploitation.

== Legacy and recognition ==
Lucy's experiences, along with those of other enslaved women such as Anarcha and Betsey, have become central to modern reassessments of the origins of gynecology. Scholars including Deidre Cooper Owens and Rachel Dudley have examined how their contributions were historically overlooked in medical narratives.

In recent years, Lucy has been recognized not only as a patient of J. Marion Sims, but as a key figure whose treatment illustrates how early gynecological knowledge was developed.

Although Sim's surgical techniques contributed to advancements in the treatment of vesicovaginal fistulas, Lucy's role in these developments has received increasing attention in both academic and public history. She and the other women are referred to as the "Mothers of Gynecology" in modern day discussions and have been recognized through memorials and continued study.
