= Reproductive Sciences =

Peer-reviewed medical journal

- Discipline: Obstetrics, gynecology
- Language: English
- Edited by: Ayman Al-Hendy and Seung-Yup Ku

Publication details
- History: 1994–present
- Publisher: Springer Nature on behalf of the Society for Reproductive Investigation
- Frequency: Monthly
- Impact factor: 2.616 (2019)

Standard abbreviations
- ISO 4: Reprod. Sci.

Indexing
- ISSN: 1933-7191
- LCCN: 2006215617
- OCLC no.: 71782486

Links
- Journal homepage

Reproductive Sciences is a peer-reviewed medical journal that publishes papers in the fields of obstetrics and gynecology. The co-editors-in-chief are Ayman Al-Hendy and Seung-Yup Ku. It was established in 1994 and is currently published by Springer Nature on behalf of the Society for Reproductive Investigation.

== Abstracting and indexing ==
The journal is abstracted and indexed in Scopus and the Social Sciences Citation Index. According to the Journal Citation Reports, its 2013 impact factor is 2.23, ranking it 17th out of 30 journals in the category "Reproductive Biology" and 26th out of 79 journals in the category "Obstetrics & Gynecology".
