= Rectovaginal fistula =

Rectovestibular fistula
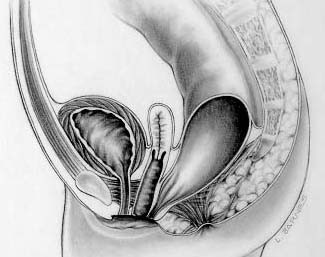
- Rectovaginal fistula
- Specialty: Gynecology
- Diagnostic method: • No anal opening • A gloved finger or thermometer cannot be inserted into the infant's rectum • No history of passage of meconium • Presence of abdominal distension • Presence of meconium in urine
- Treatment: PSARP

A rectovaginal fistula is a medical condition where there is a fistula or abnormal connection between the rectum and the vagina.

Rectovaginal fistulae may be extremely debilitating. If the opening between the rectum and vagina is wide, it will allow both flatulence and feces to escape through the vagina, leading to fecal incontinence. There is an association with recurrent urinary and vaginal infections. The fistula may also connect the rectum and urethra, which is called a recto-urethral fistula. Either condition can lead to labial fusion. This type of fistula can cause pediatricians to misdiagnose imperforate anus. The severity of the symptoms will depend on the size of the fistula. Most often, it appears about a week or so after childbirth.

== Causes ==
Rectovaginal fistulas are often the result of trauma during childbirth (in which case it is known as obstetric fistula), with increased risk associated with significant lacerations or interventions are used such as episiotomy or operative (forceps/vacuum extraction) deliveries or in situations where there is inadequate health care, such as in some developing countries. Rectovaginal fistula is said to be known as the leading cause of maternal death in developing countries. Risk factors include prolonged labour, difficult instrumental delivery, and paramedian episiotomy. Rates in Eritrea are estimated as high as 350 per 100,000 vaginal births. Fistulas can also develop as a result of physical trauma to either the vagina or anus, including from rape. Women with rectovaginal fistulae are often stigmatized in developing countries and become outcasts.

Rectovaginal fistula can also be a symptom of various diseases, including infection by lymphogranuloma venereum, or the unintended result of surgery, such as episiotomy or sex reassignment surgery. They may present as a complication of vaginal surgery, including vaginal hysterectomy. They are a recognized presentation of rectal carcinoma or rarely diverticular disease of the bowel or Crohn's disease. They are seen rarely after radiotherapy treatment for cervical cancer.

== Treatment ==
After diagnosing rectovaginal fistula, it is best to wait for around three months to allow the inflammation to subside. For low fistulae, a vaginal approach is best, while an abdominal repair would be necessary for a high fistula at the posterior fornix.
A circular incision is made around the fistula, and the vagina is separated from the underlying rectum with a sharp circumferential dissection. The entire fistulous tract, along with a small rim of rectal mucosa, is incised. The rectal wall is then closed extramucosally.

Most rectovaginal fistulas need surgical repair. Medications such as antibiotics and Infliximab may be prescribed to help close the rectovaginal fistula or prepare for surgery.
