= Brothers (ship) =

Several vessels have been named Brothers:

- Brothers (1782 ship) was launched in 1782 at Liverpool as a Guineaman. She made seven complete voyages as a slave ship in the triangular trade in enslaved people. A French privateer captured her in 1795, on her eighth voyage after she had embarked her captives. In a highly unusual move, the privateer sold Brothers and her slaves to the master of a Spanish vessel that the privateer had captured. The purchaser then took Brothers into Havana.
- Goéland was the name ship of a two-vessel class of "brick-avisos" (advice brigs), built to a design by Raymond-Antoine Haran and launched in 1787. She served the French Navy for several years carrying dispatches until in 1793 HMS Penelope and HMS Proserpine captured her off Jérémie. The Royal Navy took her into service briefly as Goelan and sold her in 1794. As the merchant brig Brothers she appears to have sailed as a whaling ship in the British southern whale fishery until 1808 or so, and then traded between London and the Brazils. She was no longer listed after 1815.
- Brothers (1785 ship) was launched in the Thirteen Colonies in 1772, probably under another name. From 1785 on she became a Bristol-based slave ship. She made six complete voyages in the triangular trade, in all embarking 1880 enslaved people. The French captured her in December 1794 as she was on the first leg of her seventh such voyage and before she had embarked any captives. The main source for this article provided detail on crew turnover and death rates for her first three voyages. The first voyage had a particularly heavy mortality rate among the crew. The main source also provided data for her fourth, fifth, and sixth voyages for mortality rates on the Middle Passage among the enslaved people that she was carrying.
- Brothers, of 16924/94 tons (bm) and six 3-pounder guns, served the Royal Navy as a hired armed vessel between 12 April 1793 and 20 September 1797.
- Brothers, of 256 tons, was a whaler that operated out of Nantucket. Between 1801 and about 1823 she made 10–11 whaling voyages. In the 1805–1807 voyage, under the command of Benjamin Worth, she was one of the first whalers from the United States to engage in whaling in the waters off New Zealand and New South Wales.
- Brothers (1815 ship) was built in Whitby, England in 1815. She made one voyage for the British East India Company (EIC), and two transporting convicts to Australia. Afterwards she traded across the Atlantic, primarily to Quebec, and was last listed in 1837.
- Brothers (1816 ship) was an Australian schooner of 40 tons (bm) wrecked in 1816.
