= Museum of African-American History =

Museum of African-American History may refer to:

- National Museum of African American History and Culture, in Washington, D.C.
- DuSable Black History Museum and Education Center, in Chicago, Illinois
- African American Museum in Philadelphia in Philadelphia, Pennsylvania
- African Meeting House, in Boston, Massachusetts
- Charles H. Wright Museum of African American History, in Detroit, Michigan
- Reginald F. Lewis Museum of Maryland African American History & Culture, in Baltimore, Maryland
- International African American Museum, in Charleston, South Carolina

== See also ==
- List of museums focused on African Americans
