= Nassau (ship) =

Several ships have been named Nassau.

- Nassau (1784 ship) was launched at New Providence in 1784. From 1785 to 1792 she sailed from London to New Providence, Philadelphia, Jamaica, Smyrna, and Quebec. A new owner in 1792 moved her registration and homeport to Bristol to sail her as a slave ship in the triangular trade in enslaved people. She made one complete slave trading voyage. A French squadron captured and burnt her in 1794 as she was on her way to Africa on her second such voyage.
- Nassau (1819 ship) was launched at Gosport in 1819. In 1824 a pirate plundered her, and then let her proceed. She was wrecked in August 1825 as she was on her way back to London from a voyage to New South Wales.

== See also ==
- HMS Nassau – one of six vessels of the Royal Navy
- HMBS Nassau – Patrol boat of the Bahamian navy
