= Bee (sloop) =

Ship in New South Wales between 1801 and 1804

Coordinates: 32.953°S 151.847°E

History
- Name: Bee
- Owner: Benjamin Crew
- Fate: Abandoned at sea 18 July 1806

General characteristics
- Class & type: Sloop
- Tons burthen: 11 (bm)

Bee was a sloop of 11 tons that was employed by the colonial government of New South Wales between 1801 and 1804. She sank in 1806 off Newcastle, New South Wales, Australia.

== Colonial history ==
Although her exact date of arrival is unclear, Bee was at Sydney, New South Wales, by 30 June 1801. Thereafter she was employed in public service for the colonial government of New South Wales. She was described as a "long boat decked" in good repair and crewed by a master and three seamen who were to receive an extra ration from the stores. She was employed to bring grain to Sydney from different settlements and for various other purposes.

Bee was under the command of Thomas Bryant when she sailed on 25 June 1806 from Sydney for the Hawkesbury River. On 28 June 1806 the ship ran into a storm that shifted her ballast and damaged her rigging and mast. All the food was washed overboard and the water barrel was smashed. On 29 June 1806 the storm abated and Bee joined with another small ship, Contest, on the way to Newcastle. While Contest managed to get into harbour, Bee was becalmed just outside. A strong current then took the ship southwards when her anchor dragged.

Further squalls sprang up over the next couple of days and shredded what was left of Bee′s sails. The two men crewing the ship, Bryant and the ship's owner, Benjamin Crew, were exhausted, hungry, and thirsty as the current then took them northward. On 12 July 1806, Bryant killed the ship's cat and they drank its blood, and on 16 July 1806 Bryant died. On 18 July 1806, Crew was able to get the attention of the passing United States whaler, Brothers, Worth, master, which rescued him. Bee was left to drift and was never seen again. Brothers landed Crew at Sydney on 21 July 1806.
