= Sims' vaginal speculum =

Surgical instrument used to inspect the vagina and cervix

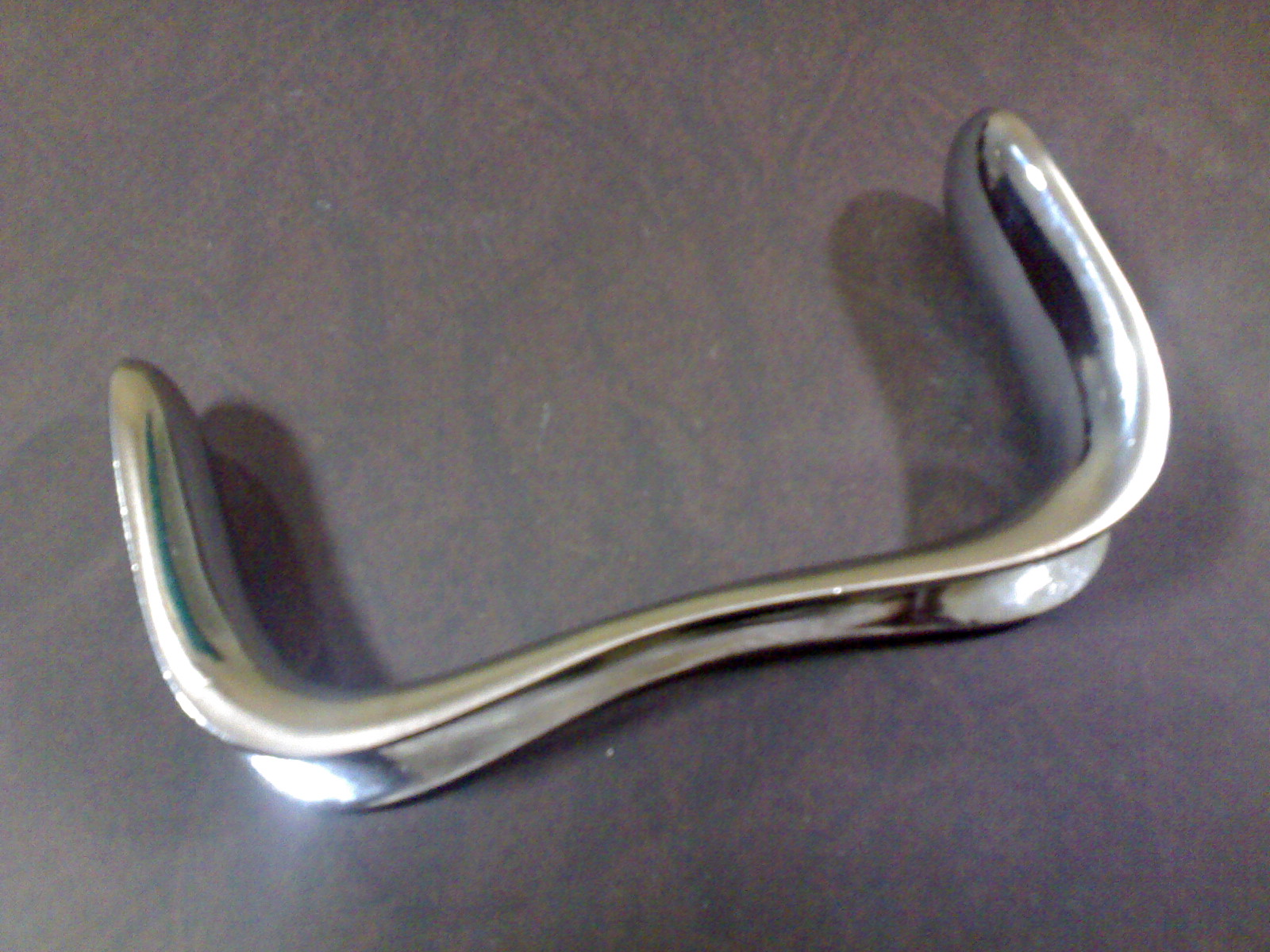
Sims' vaginal speculum

Sims' vaginal speculum is a double-bladed speculum used in gynaecology for examining the vagina and cervix. It was developed by J. Marion Sims.

== Design ==
Sims' speculum is inserted into the vagina to retract posterior vaginal wall. It gives more exposure of the vaginal walls than Cusco's speculum and therefore is preferred for gynaecological surgeries. It is possible to slide the instrument around the vaginal wall to enable better visualization. The groove in the middle of Sims' speculum allows free flow of secretions and blood to the outside, thereby keeping the area dry. Sims' speculum is available in various sizes, and the size appropriate to the vaginal dimensions of the woman is chosen for use. The disadvantage of Sims' speculum is that it is not self-retaining. The examiner might want to use an anterior wall retractor in addition to Sims' speculum for better visualization of the cervix.

== Materials ==
It was first made of pewter spoon, but nowadays it is manufactured out of stainless steel or plastic. The plastic speculum is disposable, but the stainless steel one is not. Therefore, the stainless steel speculum should be sterilized before each use.

== See also ==
- Speculum
- Instruments used in obstetrics and gynecology
