= Middle Passage =

Transoceanic segment of the Atlantic slave trade

- Part of Atlantic slave trade and Triangular trade
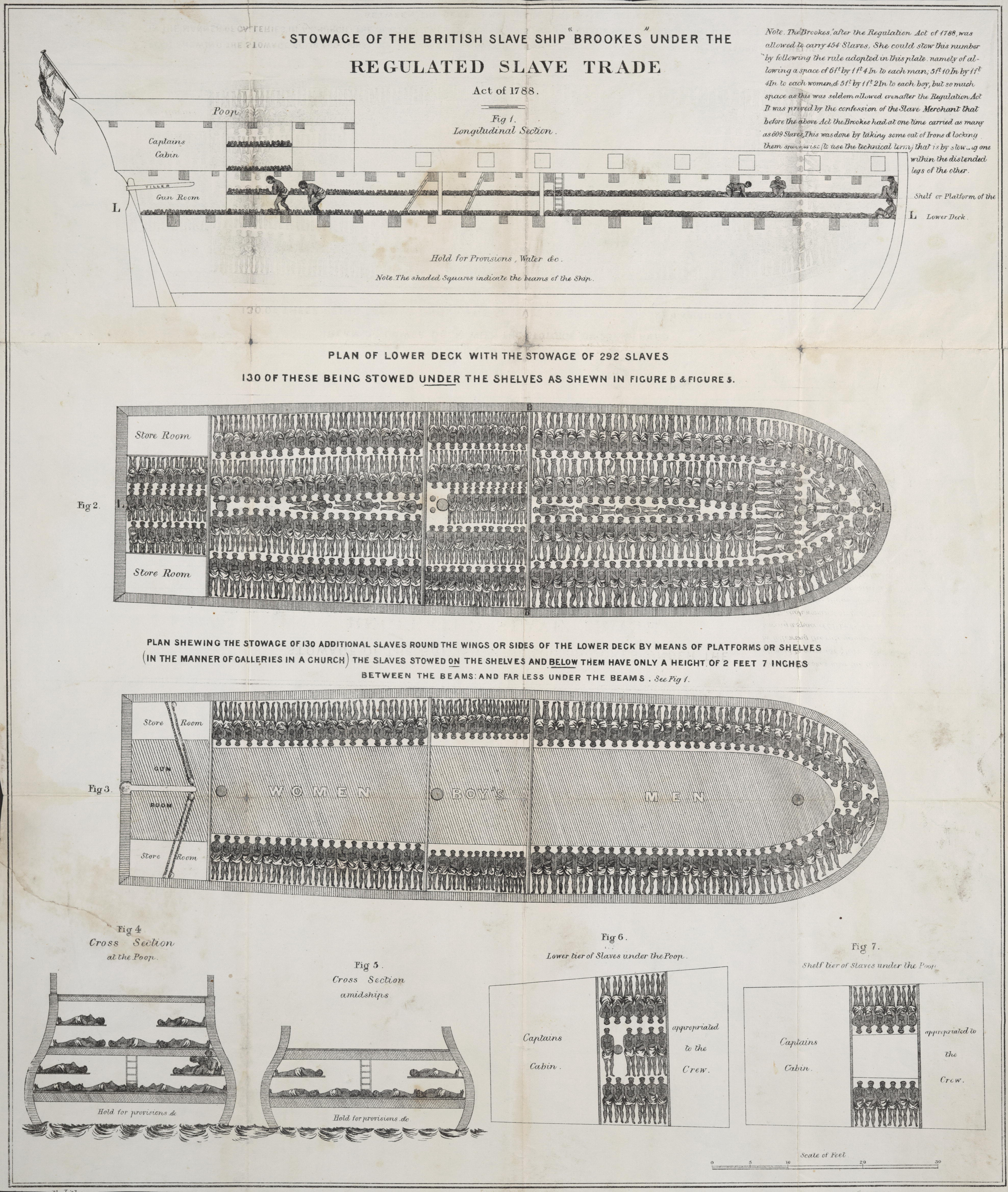
- Cross-sections of the Brookes, a 1781 British slave ship involved in the triangular Atlantic slave trade, loaded with enslaved Africans
- Date: c. 1501 – 1866
- Duration: Roughly 1 to 6 months per voyage (weather-dependent)
- Location: Atlantic Ocean (between West/Central Africa and the Americas)
- Participants: European colonial powers (notably Portugal, Britain, Spain, France, Netherlands, Denmark–Norway); African kingdoms and coastal slave merchants Enslaved Africans
- Outcome: Forced migration of millions of Africans to the Americas; high mortality rates; profound demographic, economic, and cultural shifts across four continents
- Casualties: ~12.5 million Africans embarked ~1.8 to 2.2 million died during the crossing (~15% mortality rate)

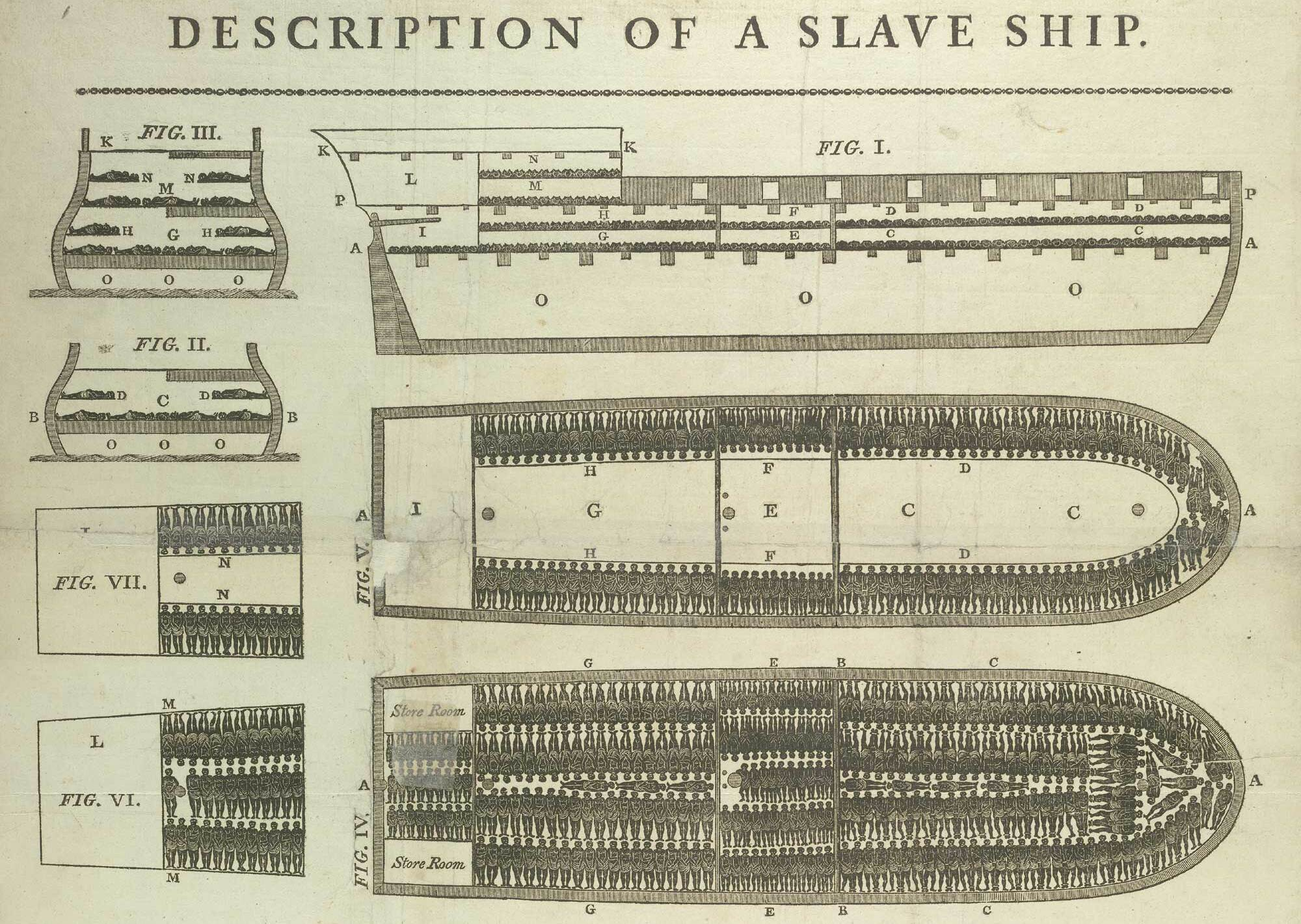
Cross-sections of the Brookes, a 1781 British slave ship involved in the triangular Atlantic slave trade, loaded with enslaved Africans

The Middle Passage was the stage of the Atlantic slave trade in which millions of Africans sold for enslavement were forcibly transported to the Americas as part of the triangular slave trade. Ships departed Europe for African markets with manufactured goods (first side of the triangle). which were then traded for captive Africans. The slave ships conditions were horrible for the slaves. Slave ships transported the African captives across the Atlantic (second side of the triangle). The proceeds from selling these enslaved people were then used to buy products such as furs and hides, tobacco, sugar, rum, and raw materials, which would be transported back to Europe (third side of the triangle, completing it).

The Atlantic slave trade developed through European slave-raiding, commerce, and expanding networks connecting European traders with African societies. European actors directly seized Africans at the beginning of the Atlantic trade: in 1441, Portuguese raiders captured people from coastal communities in Senegambia and transported them across the Atlantic. Portuguese forceful capture was later resumed in west-central Africa following the establishment of Portuguese Angola. The expansion of European-controlled plantation economies in the Americas created a rapidly increasing demand for enslaved African labor, transforming the scale and character of the Atlantic trade. European traders subsequently obtained large numbers of captives through relationships with African political and commercial authorities, while European demand contributed to warfare, raiding, and other forms of coercion in parts of Africa. The processes by which people were enslaved and transported to Atlantic ports varied by region and period. African rulers and communities also resisted the seizure and export of people, including through laws and treaties prohibiting the slave trade and the removal of people for enslavement.

The Final Passage was the journey from the port of disembarkation in the Americas to the plantation or other destination for enslavement into forced labor. The Middle Passage across the Atlantic joined these two. Voyages on the Middle Passage were large financial undertakings, generally organized by companies or groups of investors rather than individuals.

The first European slave ship transported African captives from São Tomé to New Spain in 1525. Portuguese and Dutch traders dominated the trade in the 16th and 17th centuries, though by the 18th century they were supplanted by the British and French. Other European nations involved were Spain, Denmark–Norway, Sweden, Prussia, and various Italian city-states as well as traders from the United States. The enslaved Africans came mostly from the regions of Senegambia, Upper Guinea, Windward Coast, Gold Coast, Bight of Benin, Bight of Biafra, and Angola. With the growing abolitionist movements in the United Kingdom and in the United States, the transatlantic slave trade gradually declined until being fully abolished in the second half of the 19th century.

Most contemporary historians estimate that between 9.4 and 12.6 million Africans were forcefully taken to the New World. During the Middle Passage, an estimated two million enslaved Africans died (about 14%). Ship logs indicate a mortality rate of up to 47-58% on some voyages. Captive Africans were transported in wretched conditions, men and women separated, across the Atlantic. The Middle Passage was considered a time of in-betweenness where captive Africans forged bonds of kinship, which then created forced transatlantic communities.

== New World destinations ==
Map of the triangular trade

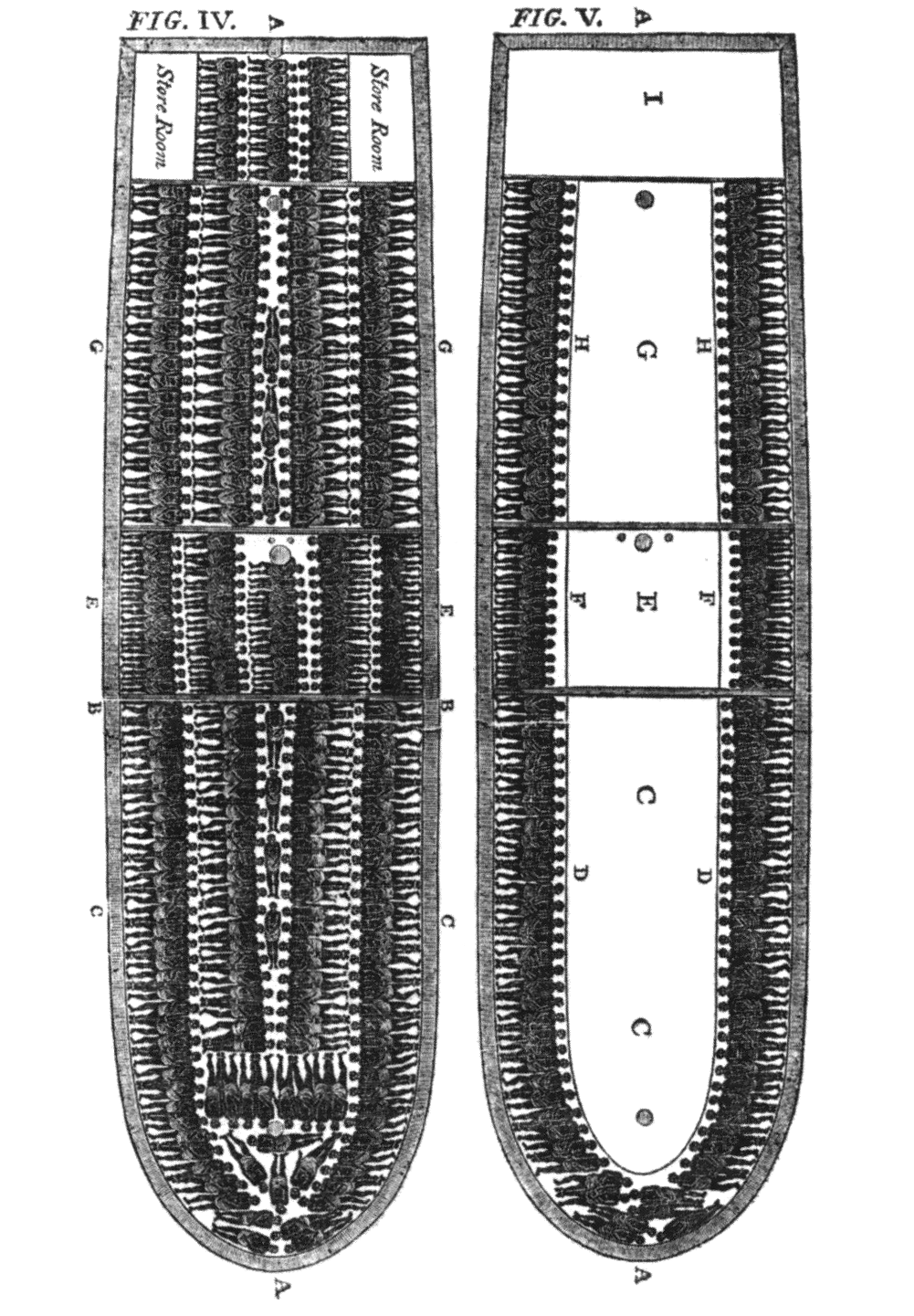
Diagram of a slave ship from the Atlantic slave trade. From an Abstract of Evidence delivered before a select committee of the House of Commons in 1790 and 1791.

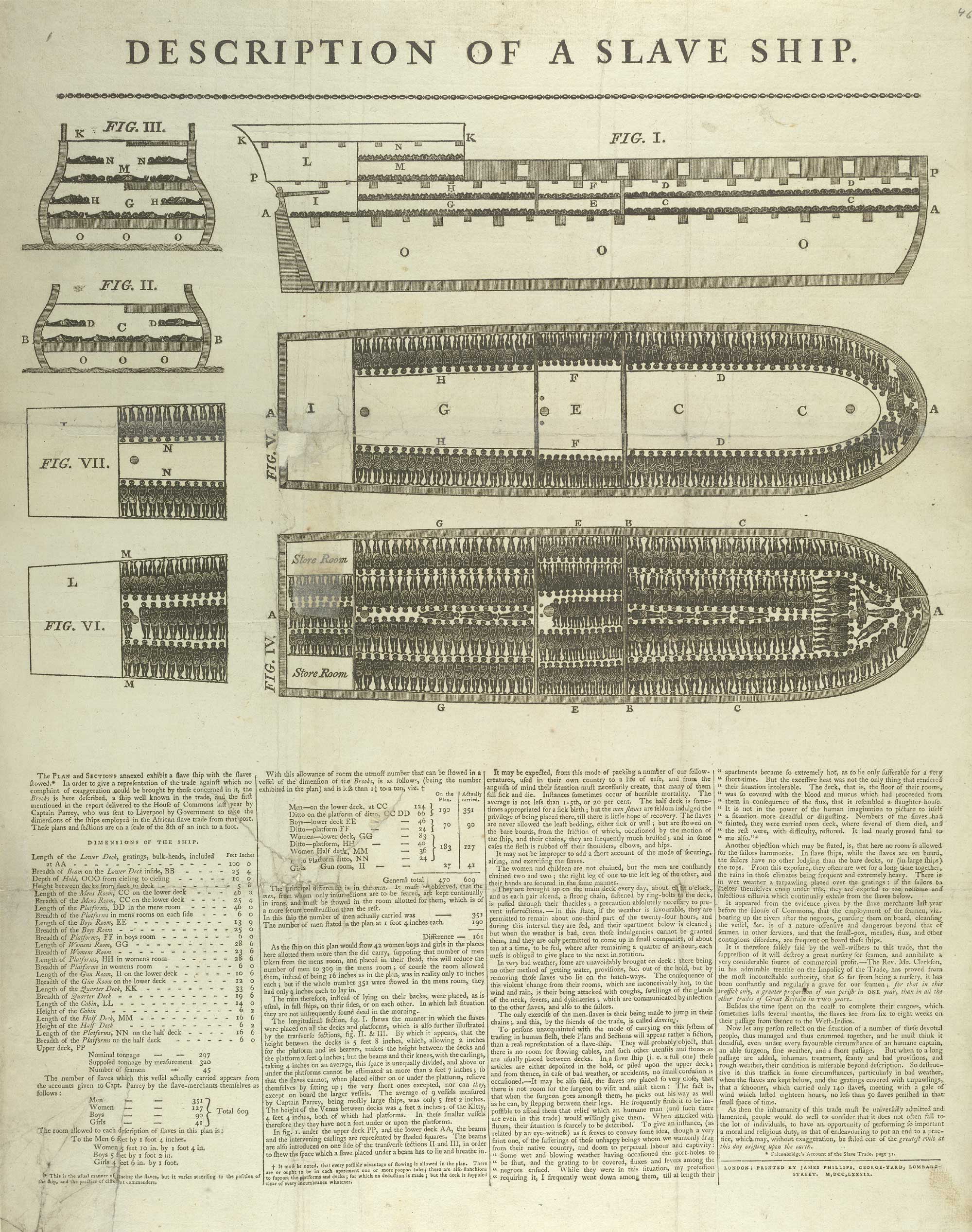
Description of the Brookes, a British slave ship, 1787

=== Caribbean ===
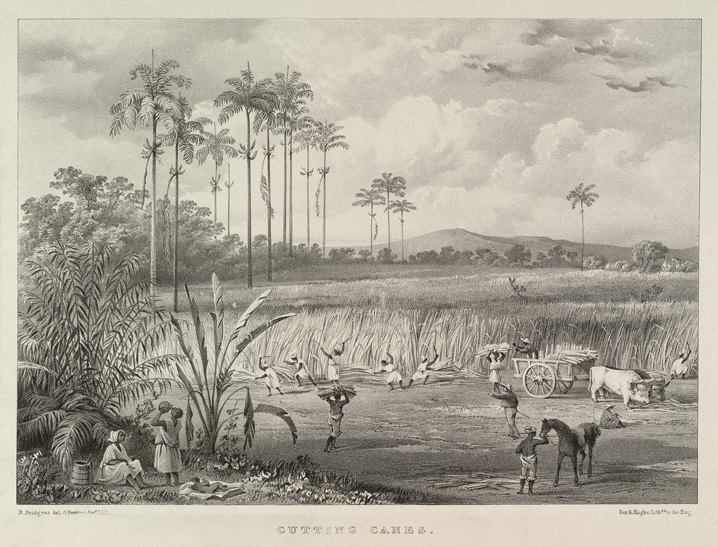
A sugarcane plantation in Trinidad, 1836, lithograph. In 1834, Britain abolished slavery in its colonies.

The first slaves to arrive as part of a labour force in the New World reached the island of Hispaniola (now Haiti and the Dominican Republic) in 1502. Cuba received its first four slaves in 1513. Jamaica received its first shipment of 4,000 slaves in 1518. "Between the 1490s and the 1850s, Latin America, including the Spanish-speaking Caribbean and Brazil, transported the largest number of African slaves to the New World, generating the single-greatest concentration of black populations outside of the African continent." About 4 million enslaved Africans were transported to the Caribbean by way of the transatlantic slave trade. Cuba, the largest slave colony in Hispanic America, transported 800,000 enslaved Africans and participated in the illegal slave trade longer than any other. Enslaved Africans worked about 16 hours a day on the sugarcane plantations. They brought their traditional religions from West Africa; these developed in the new world as religions that scholars call African diaspora religions.

=== Central America ===
Slave exports to Honduras and Guatemala started in 1526. Historian Nigel Bolland writes of the slave trade in Central America: "The demand for labor in the early Spanish settlements of Hispaniola, Cuba, Panama, and Peru resulted in a large-scale Indian (Indigenous people) slave trade in Central America in the second quarter of the 16th century. Indeed, the first colonial economy of the region was based on slave trading."

In the 16th century, the majority of Africans transported to Central America came from present-day Senegambia and other West African regions. Between 1607 and 1640, Portuguese slave traders transported Africans from Angola to Honduras and were sold in Santiago de Guatemala to work in the sugar and indigo plantations. The majority of the Africans working in the plantations were from the Luanda region in Central Africa.

=== United States ===
The first enslaved Africans to reach what would become the United States arrived in August 1526 as part of a Spanish attempt to colonise San Miguel de Gualdape. By November, the 300 Spanish colonists were reduced to 100, and their slaves from 100 to 70. The enslaved people revolted in 1526 and joined a nearby Native American tribe, while the Spanish abandoned the colony altogether (1527). The area of the future Colombia received its first enslaved people in 1533. El Salvador, Costa Rica, and Florida began their stints in the slave trade in 1541, 1563, and 1581, respectively. According to research, about 40 percent of enslaved Africans arrived at Gadsden's Wharf, which was the largest slave port in the United States.

In the 17th century in colonial Boston in Massachusetts, about 166 transatlantic voyages embarked out of Boston. Boston transported enslaved people from Africa and exported rum. Peter Faneuil organised and profited from the trans-Atlantic voyages out of Boston and transported manufactured goods from Europe, and transported enslaved people, rum, and sugar from the Caribbean. Connecticut, Massachusetts, and Rhode Island were the three New England states with the largest slave populations. The enslaved population in South Kingston, Rhode Island was thirty percent, in Boston the slave population was ten percent, in New London it was nine percent, and in New York it was 7.2 percent. The earliest documentation of enslaved people in New England was 1638. In Northern American British colonies, Massachusetts Bay colonies was the center for slave trading and colonial Boston was a major slave port in the North importing slaves directly from Africa.

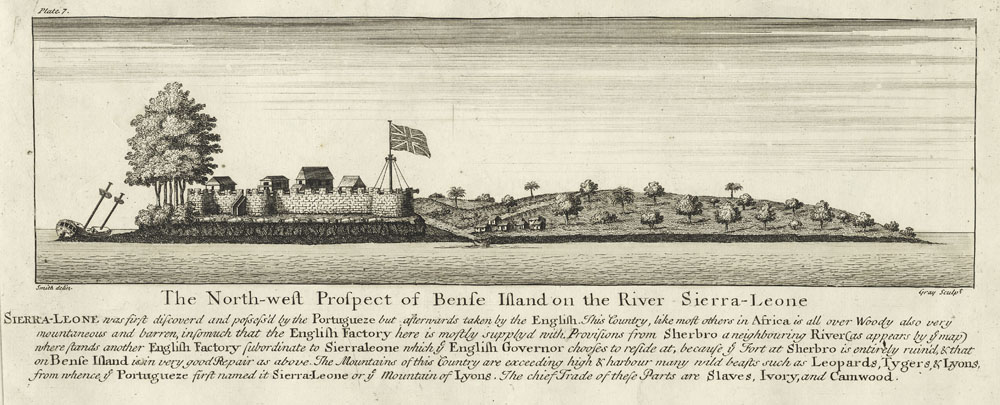
Bunce Island in Sierra Leone exported tens of thousands of Africans to the Sea Islands of South Carolina and Georgia. Gadsden's Wharf in Charleston, South Carolina, received the majority of transported slaves from Bunce Island. African Americans in the Sea Islands can trace their ancestry to Sierra Leone.

The 17th century saw an increase in shipments. Africans were brought to Point Comfort – several miles downriver from the English colony of Jamestown, Virginia – in 1619. The first kidnapped Africans in English North America were classed as indentured servants and freed after seven years. Virginia law codified chattel slavery in 1656, and in 1662 the colony adopted the principle of partus sequitur ventrem, which classified children of slave mothers as slaves, regardless of paternity. Under British law, children born of white male slave owners and black female slaves would have inherited the father's status and rights. The change to maternal inheritance for slaves guaranteed that anyone born with any slave ancestors was a slave, with no regard to the nature of the relations between the white father and the black mother, consensual or not.

In addition to African persons, Indigenous peoples of the Americas were trafficked through Atlantic trade routes. The 1677 work The Doings and Sufferings of the Christian Indians, for example, documents English colonial prisoners of war (not, in fact, opposing combatants, but imprisoned members of English-allied forces) being enslaved and sent to Caribbean destinations. Captive Indigenous opponents, including women and children, were also sold into slavery at a substantial profit, to be transported to West Indies colonies.

=== South America ===
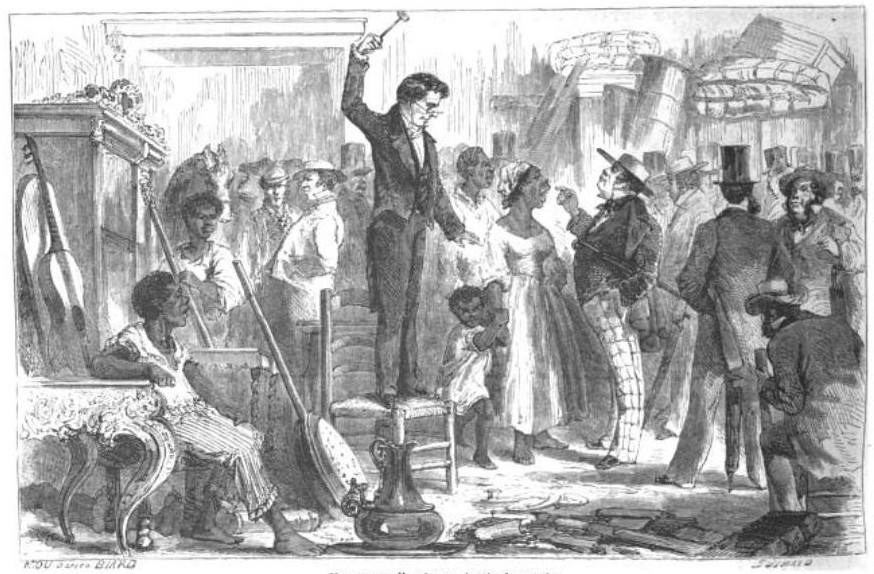
A slave sale transaction in Rio de Janeiro

The Spanish and Portuguese colonised South America and enslaved the Indigenous people. They later enslaved Africans brought from West and Central Africa in ships by way of the Atlantic slave trade. Brazil transported 4.8 million enslaved Africans. Africans who escaped slavery there formed quilombos, maroon communities with degrees of self-governance. Palamares, a quilombo community, lasted for 100 years while other communities were quickly removed by the Dutch and Portuguese. The Africans transported to Brazil were Yoruba, Fon, Bantu and others. Their religions from Africa developed into new world religions in Brazil called Candomblé, Umbanda, Xango, and Macumba.

Historian Erika Edwards writes of the slave trade in Argentina: "In 1587 the first slaves arrived in Buenos Aires from Brazil. From 1580 to 1640, the main commercial activity for Buenos Aires was the slave trade. More than 70 percent of the value of all imports arriving in Buenos Aires were enslaved Africans. Slaves came primarily from Brazil via the Portuguese slave trade from Angola and other western states in Africa. Once arriving in Buenos Aires, they could be sent as far as Lima, Peru; slaves were provided to Mendoza, Tucumán, and Salta Jujuy as well as to Chile, Paraguay, and what is today Bolivia and southern Peru."

=== Russia ===
By 1802, Russian colonists noted that "Boston" (U.S.-based) skippers were trading African slaves for otter pelts with the Tlingit people in Southeast Alaska.

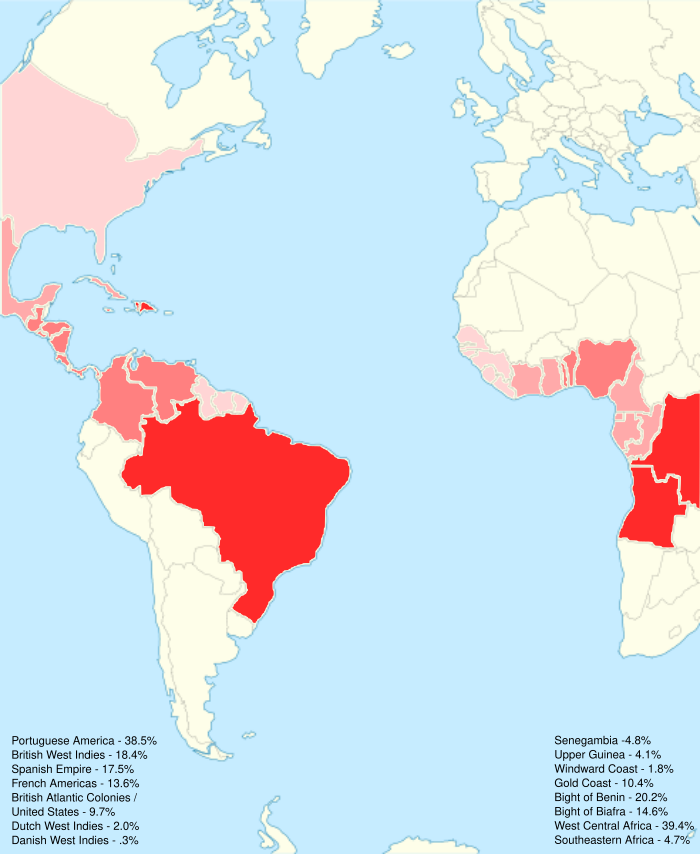
West Central Africa was the most common source region of Africa, and Portuguese America (Brazil) was the most common destination.

Distribution of slaves (1519–1867)
Destination	Percent
Portuguese America	38.5%
British West Indies	18.4%
Spanish Empire	17.5%
French West Indies	13.6%
English/British North America / United States	9.7%
Dutch West Indies	2.0%
Danish West Indies	0.3%

Notes:

- Before 1820, the number of enslaved Africans transported across the Atlantic to the New World was triple the number of Europeans who reached North and South American shores. At the time this was the largest oceanic displacement or migration in history, eclipsing even the far-flung, but less-dense, expansion of Austronesian-Polynesian explorers.
- The number of Africans who arrived in each region is calculated from the total number of slaves transported, about 10,000,000.
- Includes British Guiana and British Honduras
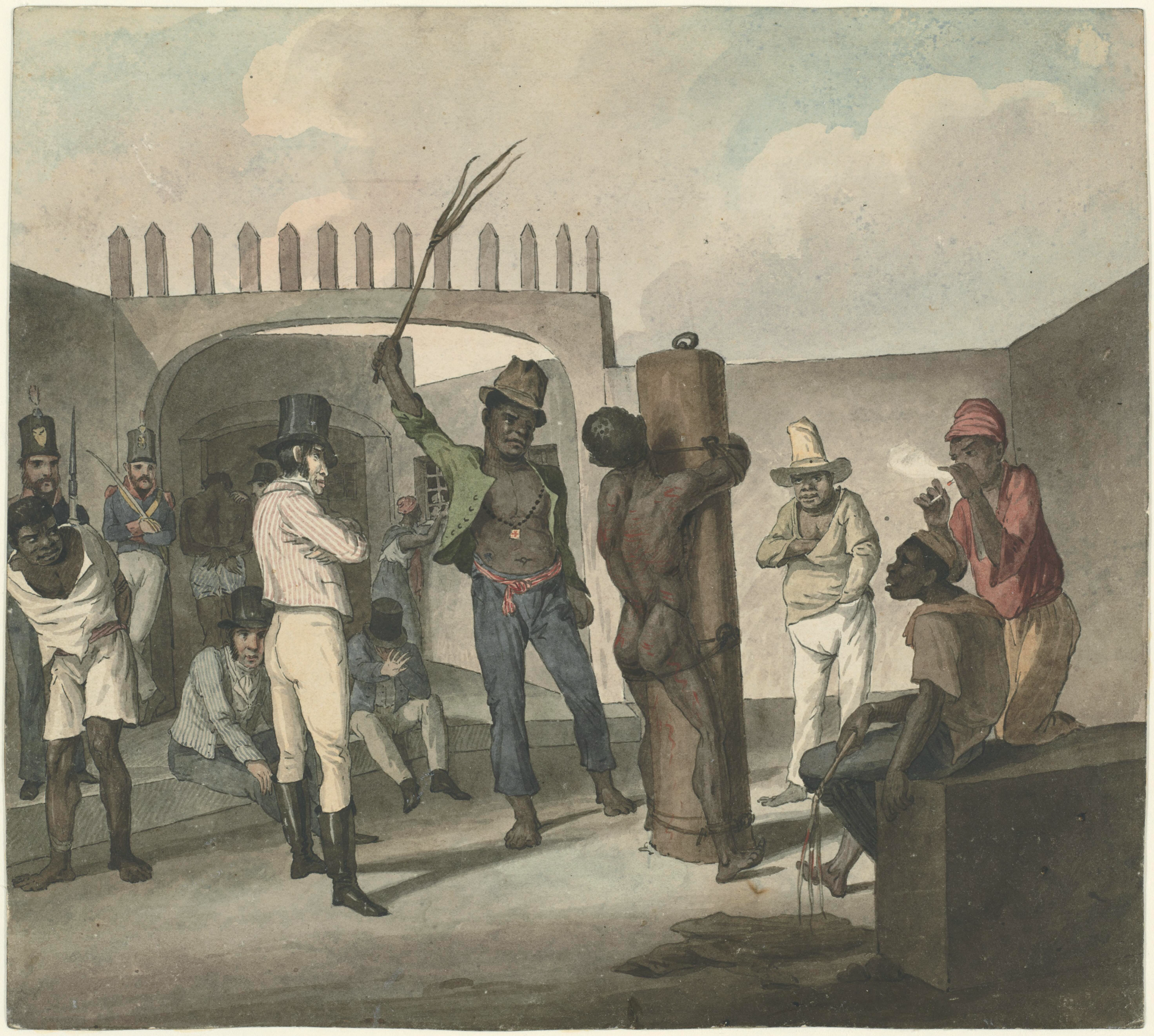
Punishing slaves at Calabouço, in Rio de Janeiro, c. 1822

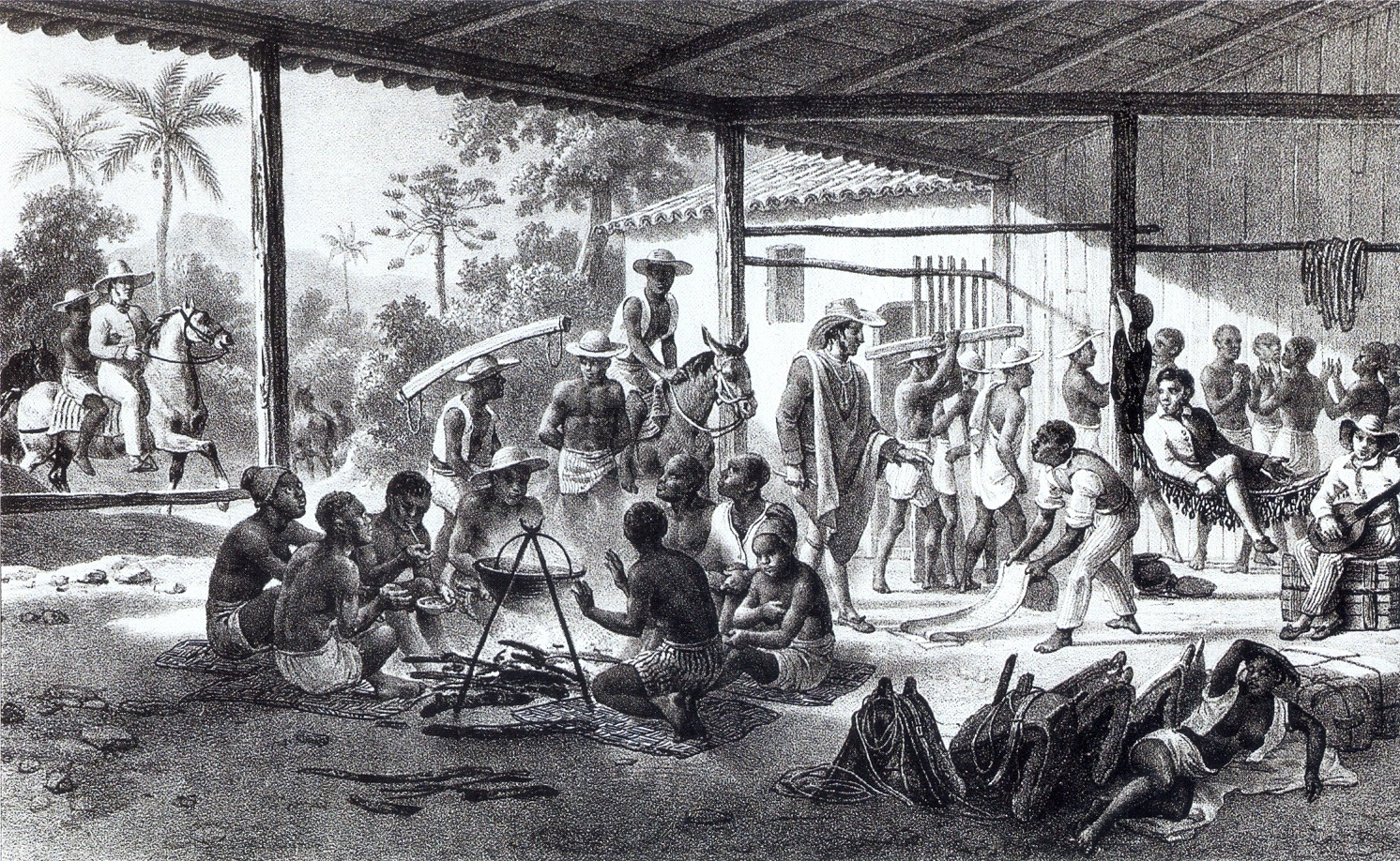
Recently bought slaves in Brazil on their way to the farms of the landowners who bought them c. 1830

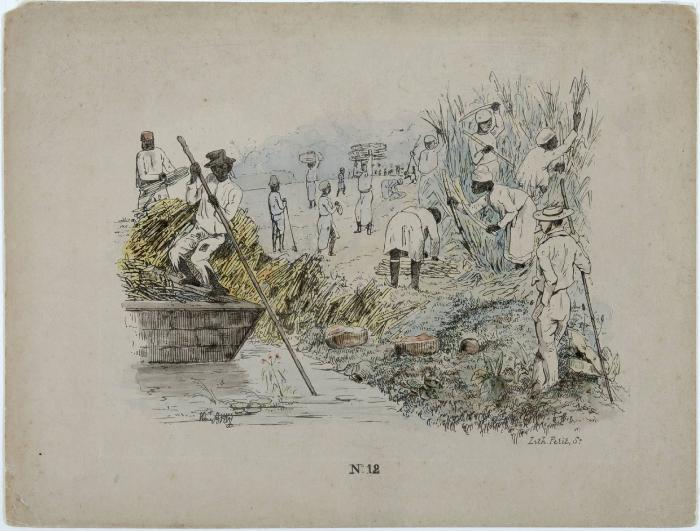
A 19th-century lithograph showing a sugarcane plantation in Suriname

== Journey ==
=== Conditions ===
Typical slave ships contained several hundred slaves with about 30 crew members. Some voyages had as many as 450-700 enslaved Africans. Deaths directly attributable to the Middle Passage voyage are estimated at up to two million; a broader look at African deaths directly attributable to the institution of slavery from 1500 to 1900 suggests up to four million deaths.

The captive Africans were normally chained together in pairs to save space—right leg chained to the next man's left leg. The chains or hand and leg cuffs were known as bilboes, which were among the many tools of the slave trade and which were always in short supply. Bilboes consisted of two iron shackles locked on a post and were usually fastened around the ankles of two men. Captive Africans were held below decks in such confined spaces that they were forced to lay on their sides in "a space of six feet by one foot four inches for a man, and a little less for a woman."

At best, captive slaves were fed beans, corn, yams, rice, and palm oil, once per day with water, if at all. When food was scarce, slaveholders would have priority over the enslaved. Sometimes captives were allowed to move around during the day, but many ships kept the shackles on throughout the arduous journey. Aboard certain French ships, the slaves were brought on deck to periodically receive fresh air. While enslaved women were typically permitted to be on deck more frequently, enslaved men would be watched closely to prevent revolt when above deck.

The enslaved Africans lived for months in squalid conditions. Disease and starvation were the main contributors to the death toll, with amoebic dysentery and scurvy causing the majority of deaths. Additionally, outbreaks of smallpox, measles, and other diseases spread rapidly in the close-quarter compartments. Alexander Falconbridge, who was a doctor on a slave ship testified that the deck "was so covered with the blood and mucus which had proceeded from them in consequence of the flux that if resembeled a slaughter-house." The rate of death increased with the length of the voyage, since the incidence of dysentery and of scurvy increased with longer stints at sea as the quality and amount of food and water diminished. Enslaved Africans who became sick were often separated from other captives and stored under the half-deck. Dr. Falconbridge recounted that "those who are emacaited frequently have their skin, and even their flesh, entirely rubbed off by the motion of the ship... so as to render the bones in those parts quite bare." Mortality rates were high and those who had been sick and died were not always found immediately. This made the intolerable conditions even worse. Many of the living could have been shackled to someone who was dead for hours, or perhaps days. Captors threw the bodies of those who died overboard and schools of sharks followed slave ships "waiting to devour the dead bodies thrown overboard almost every day."

=== Treatment of enslaved people and resistance ===
Treatment of the enslaved individuals was horrific since the captured African men and women were considered less than human; to slavers, they were "cargo", or "goods", and treated as such. Women with children were not as desirable for enslavement because they took up too much space, and toddlers were not wanted because of everyday maintenance.

The enslaved were kept fed and supplied with drink as healthy slaves were more valuable. Enslaved Africans who refused to eat had their mouths forced open with an oral speculum or were burned with hot coals. Punishment and torture of the enslaved was very common, as on the voyage the crew sought to make those who were enslaved obedient Mortality was high; those with strong bodies survived. Young women and girls were raped by the crew. The mortality rates were considerably higher in Africa during the process of capturing and transporting the enslaved people to the coast. Many women suffered at the hands of crew members through sexual violence and the responsibility of caregiving for sick captives. Women would even give birth during the voyage, without assistance or medical care. Most newborns did not survive.

The worst punishments were for rebelling; in one instance a captain punished a failed rebellion by killing one involved enslaved man immediately and forcing two other slaves to eat his heart and liver.

As a way to counteract disease and maintain the health of their "cargo," the crew would force the enslaved onto the deck of the ship to dance, usually resulting in beatings because the enslaved would be unwilling to dance for them or interact. These beatings would often be severe and could result in enslaved Africans dying or becoming more susceptible to diseases.

==== Suicide ====
Slaves resisted in many ways, however when it was too much to bear, suicide became a frequent occurrence, often by refusal of food or medicine or jumping overboard, as well as by a variety of other opportunistic means. If an enslaved person jumped overboard, they would often be left to drown or shot from the ship. Over the centuries, some African peoples, such as the Kru, came to be understood as holding substandard value as slaves, because they developed a reputation for being too proud to be enslaved and for attempting suicide immediately upon losing their freedom.

Both jumping overboard and self-starving were prevented as much as possible by slaver crews; the enslaved were often force-fed or tortured until they ate, though some still managed to starve themselves to death; the enslaved were kept away from means of suicide, and the sides of the deck were often netted. The enslaved were still successful, especially at jumping overboard. Often when an uprising failed, the mutineers would jump en masse into the sea. Slaves generally believed that if they jumped overboard, they would be returned to their family and friends in their village or to their ancestors in the afterlife.

Suicide by jumping overboard was such a problem that captains had to address it directly in many cases. They used the sharks that followed the ships as a terror weapon. One captain who had a rash of suicides on his ship took a woman and lowered her into the water on a rope, and pulled her out as fast as possible. When she came in view, the sharks had already killed her, biting off the lower half of her body.

==== Identity and communication ====
Unbeknownst to the Europeans, in order to interact with each other on the voyage, the enslaved created a communication system. They would construct choruses on the passages using their voices, bodies, and the ships; the hollow design of the ships allowed the enslaved to use them as percussive instruments and to amplify their songs. This combination of "instruments" was both a way to communicate and to create a new identity, since slavers attempted to strip them of that. Although most of the enslaved were from various regions around Africa, their situation allowed them to come together and create a new culture and identity aboard the ships with a common language and method of communication:

[C]all and response soundings allowed men and women speaking different languages to communicate about the conditions of their captivity. In fact, on board the Hubridas, what began as murmurs and morphed into song erupted before long into the shouts and cries of coordinated revolt.

This communication was a direct subversion of European authority and allowed the enslaved to have a form of power and identity otherwise prohibited. Furthermore, such organization and coming together enabled revolts and uprisings to actually be coordinated and successful at times.

The enslaved would appeal to their gods for protection and vengeance upon their captors, and would also try to curse and otherwise harm the crew using idols and fetishes. One crew found fetishes in their water supply, placed by the enslaved who believed they would kill all who drank from it.

==== Uprisings ====
Aboard ships, the captives were not always willing to follow orders. Sometimes they reacted in violence. Slave ships were designed and operated to try to prevent the slaves from revolting. Resistance among the slaves usually ended in failure and participants in the rebellion were punished severely. About one out of ten ships experienced some sort of rebellion.

Ottobah Cugoano, who was enslaved and taken from Africa as a child, later described an uprising aboard the ship on which he was transported to the West Indies:

When we found ourselves at last taken away, death was more preferable than life, and a plan was concerted amongst us, that we might burn and blow up the ship, and to perish all together in the flames.

The number of rebels varied widely; often the uprisings would end with the death of a few slaves and crew. Surviving rebels were punished or executed as examples to the other slaves on board.

A frequently cited legal case is the 1781 voyage of the British slave ship Zong. They took too many enslaved on a voyage to the New World in 1781. Overcrowding combined with malnutrition and disease killed several crew members and around 60 enslaved. Bad weather made the Zong's voyage slow and lack of drinking water became a concern. The crew decided to drown some slaves at sea, to conserve water and allow the owners to collect insurance for lost cargo. About 130 slaves were killed, and some chose to kill themselves in defiance by jumping into the water. The Zong incident became fuel for the abolitionist movement and a major court case, as the insurance company refused to compensate for the loss.

=== Sailing technologies ===
The duration of the transatlantic voyage varied widely, from one to six months depending on weather conditions. The journey became more efficient over the centuries: while an average transatlantic journey of the early 16th century lasted several months, by the 19th century the crossing was faster at five to seven weeks.

The desire for profits in the 18th-century Atlantic market economy drove changes in ship designs and in managing human cargo, which included enslaved Africans and the mostly European crew. Improvements in air flow on board the ships helped to decrease the infamous mortality rate that these ships had become known for throughout the 16th and 17th centuries. The new designs that allowed ships to navigate faster and into rivers' mouths ensured access to many more enslaving posts along the West African coast. The monetary value of enslaved Africans on any given American auction-block during the mid-18th century ranged between $800 and $1,200, which in modern times would be equivalent to $32,000–48,000 per person. Therefore, ship captains and investors sought technologies that would protect their human cargo.

Throughout the height of the Atlantic slave trade (1570–1808), ships that transported the enslaved people were normally smaller than traditional cargo ships, with most ships that transported the enslaved measuring between 150 and 250 tons. This equated to about 350 to 450 enslaved Africans on each slave ship, or 1.5 to 2.4 per ton. The English ships of the time normally fell on the larger side of this spectrum and the French on the smaller side. Ships purposely designed to be smaller and more maneuverable were meant to navigate the African coastal rivers into farther inland ports; these ships therefore increased the effects of the slave trade on Africa.

The ships' sizes increased slightly throughout the 18th century; however, the number of enslaved Africans per ship remained the same. This reduction in the ratio of enslaved Africans to ship tonnage was designed to increase the amount of space per person and thus improve the survival chances of everyone on board. These ships also had temporary storage decks that were separated by an open latticework or grate bulkhead. Ship masters would presumably use these chambers to divide enslaved Africans and help prevent mutiny. Some ships developed by the turn of the 19th century had ventilation ports built into the sides and between gun ports (with hatches to keep inclement weather out). These open deck designs increased airflow and thus helped improve survival rates.

Another major factor in "cargo protection" was the increase in knowledge of diseases and medicines (along with the inclusion of a variety of medicines on the ships). First the Dutch East India Company in the 18th century, followed by some other countries and companies in the late 18th and early 19th centuries, realized that the inclusion of surgeons and other medical practitioners aboard their ships was an endeavor that proved too costly for the benefits. So instead of including medical personnel, they stocked the ships with a large variety of medicines. While this was better than no medicines, and given the fact that many crew members at least had some idea of how disease was spread, without the inclusion of medical personnel the mortality rate was still very high in the 18th century.

=== Sailors and crew ===
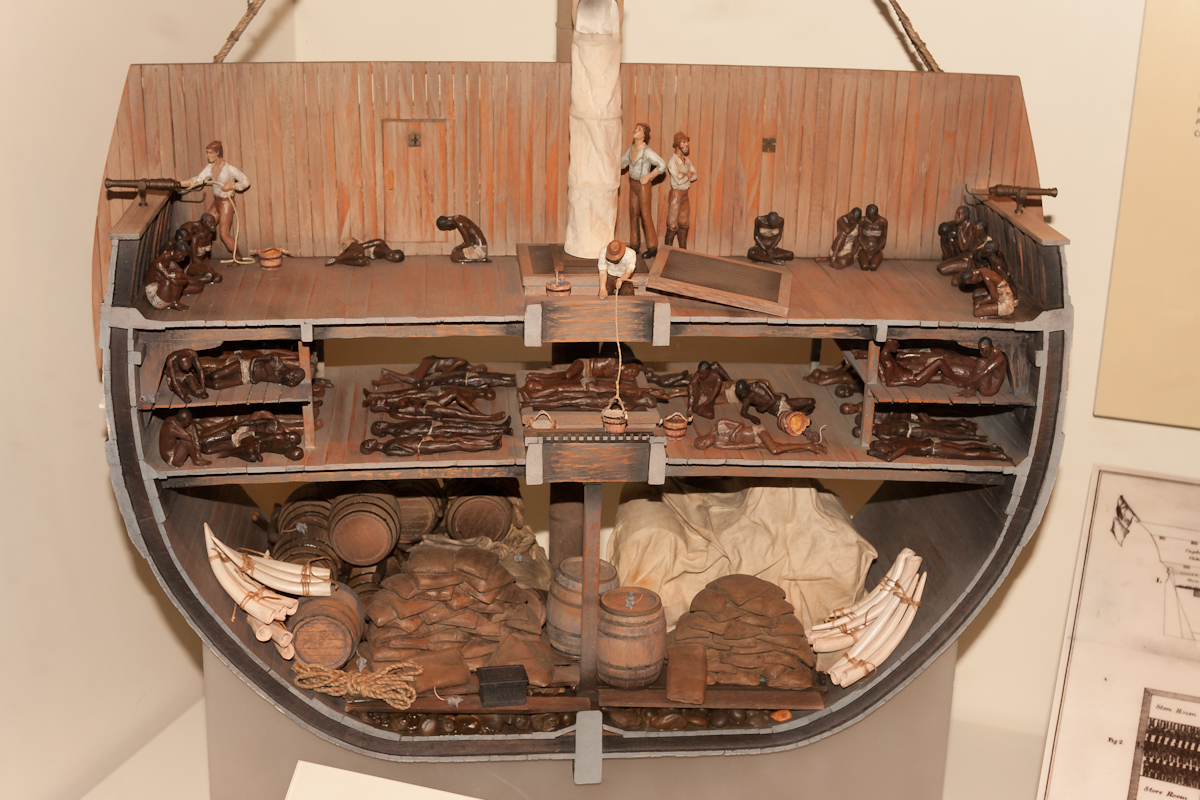
Slave ship model

While the owners and captains of slave ships could expect vast profits, the ordinary sailors were often inadequately paid and subject to brutal discipline. Sailors often had to live and sleep without shelter on the open deck for the entirety of the Atlantic voyage as the entire space below deck was occupied by enslaved people.

A crew mortality rate of around 20% was expected during a voyage, with sailors dying as a result of disease (specifically malaria and yellow fever), flogging or slave uprisings. A high crew mortality rate on the return voyage was in the captain's interests as it reduced the number of sailors who had to be paid on reaching the home port. Crew members who survived were frequently cheated out of their wages on their return.

The sailors were often employed through coercion as they generally knew about and hated the slave trade. In port towns, recruiters and tavern owners would induce sailors to become very drunk (and indebted) and then offer to relieve their debt if they signed contracts with slave ships. If they did not, they would be imprisoned. Sailors in prison had a hard time getting jobs outside of the slave ship industry since most other maritime industries would not hire "jail-birds", so they were forced to go to the slave ships anyway.

=== Profit and economics ===
The violence was done out of economic motives. Captains of the ships and investors tried to balance profit with survival by overcrowding ships and lowering rations to maximize gains. Some captains were even granted bonuses if the death tolls were lower, yet it was still a system that produced something called "calculated cruelty," in which human lives were seen as opportunity costs versus profits. Voyages to Brazil or the Caribbean, due to distance and tropical disease saw higher mortality rates than those to North America. By the 19th century, mortality still remained devastatingly high even with improvements to the ships.

== See also ==
- Asiento de Negros
- Biography and the Black Atlantic
- European colonization of the Americas
- History of Africa
- Indian Ocean slave trade
- Maafa
- Press gang
