= Cusco's speculum =

Surgical instrument for inspecting the vagina and cervix

- Historical bivalved specula
- Cusco's speculum (in page)
- Graves' speculum

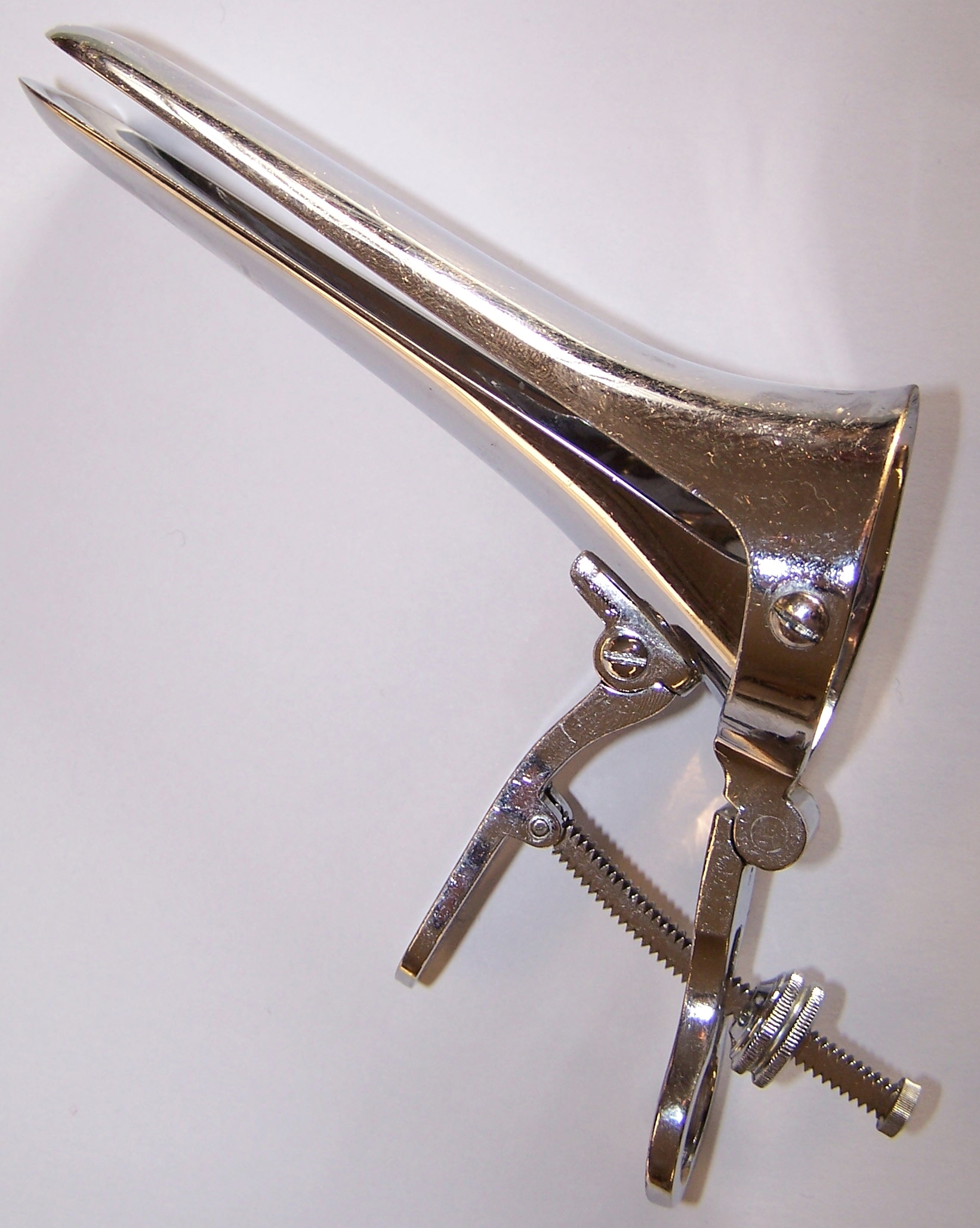
Side view of a modern metallic bivalved speculum.

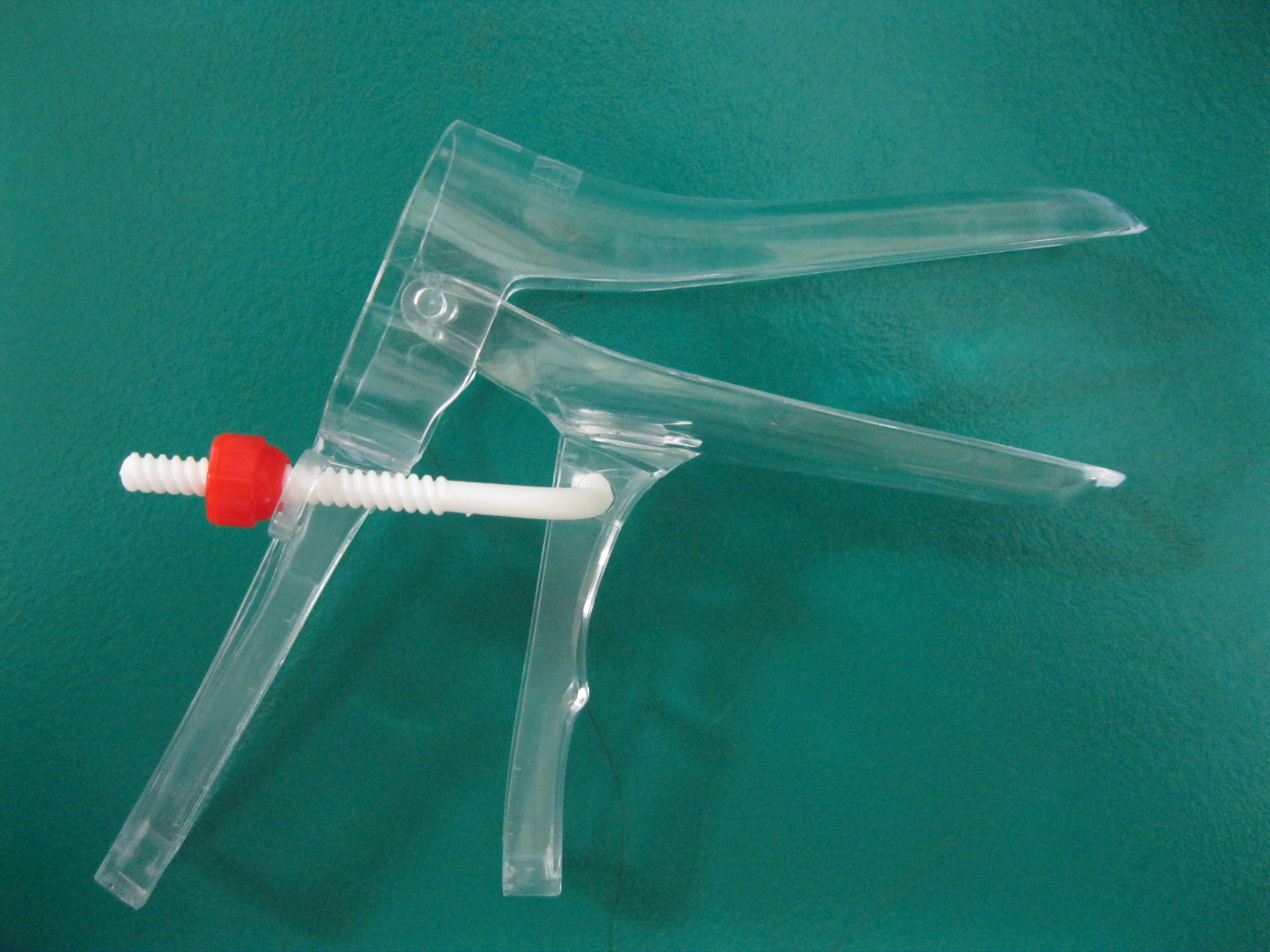
Side view of a modern plastic (ie, disposable) bivalved speculum.

In gynaecology, Cusco's self-retaining bivalved speculum is a kind of speculum used for vaginal and cervical examinations. It has a jaw that opens up like a duck bill.

The instrument was named after French surgeon Édouard-Gabriel Cusco (1819–1894).

It comes in three models: side screw, centre screw, and special narrow virgin size. Cusco's speculum is usually 80 millimeters (3.1 in) long and 22 millimeters (0.87 in) broad. However, smaller and larger sizes are available. Cusco's speculum is used for introducing an intrauterine contraceptive device, taking a Pap smear, cauterization of vaginal erosion, and colposcopic examination. It is preferred in cryosurgery because it protects the anterior and posterior vaginal wall. The advantage of Cusco's speculum is that it is self-retaining. Therefore, an assistant's help is not needed to keep the speculum in place. It also acts as the vaginal wall retractor. However, it reduces the space in the vaginal cavity and therefore is not a preferred instrument for vaginal surgery. Because it covers most of the vaginal wall, small lesions on the vaginal wall may be masked by the blades of the device.

The modern bivalved speculum, though often called "Cusco's", is actually derived from T.W. Graves' design which combined Cusco's operating principle with a duckbill design from Sims' vaginal speculum. The Graves design has a handle that allows the lower part to be held and used independently, unlike Cusco's original design.
