= Brothers (1785 ship) =

History

Great Britain
- Name: Brothers
- Owner: James Jones (Note: In the period 1789–1791, Bristol's enslaving trade was highly concentrated in the hands of a small number of firms. It was much more concentrated than the smaller trade in London, or the larger trade in Liverpool. James Jones dominated the trade out of Bristol, with about 26% of the tonnage employed. His brother Thomas accounted for about 14%. The top four firms accounted for 93.2%.)
- Launched: 1772
- Captured: December 1794

General characteristics
- Tons burthen: 190, or 200, or 201 (bm)
- Complement: 32–40
- Armament: 1793: 12 × 4&6-pounder guns; 1794: 12 × 4-pounder guns

Brothers was launched in the Thirteen Colonies in 1772, probably under another name. From 1785 she became a Bristol-based slave ship. She made six complete voyages in the triangular trade, in all embarking 1880 enslaved people. The French captured her in December 1794 as she was on the first leg of her seventh such voyage and before she had embarked any captives. The main source for this article provided detail on crew turnover and death rates for her first three voyages. The first voyage had a particularly heavy mortality rate among the crew. The main source also provided data for her fourth, fifth, and sixth voyages for mortality rates on the Middle Passage among the enslaved people that she was carrying.

== Career ==
Brothers first appeared in Lloyd's Register (LR), in the issue for 1786; the 1785 issue is not available online. The absence of a volume for 1785 makes it impossible to see whether the Brothers in the 1784 issue, the former Somersall (or Sommersale), became the Brothers of this article.

Year	Master	Owner	Trade	Source & notes
1786	J.Howlett	Jones & Co.	Bristol–Africa	LR; almost rebuilt 1785

1st voyage transporting enslaved people (1785–1787): Captain Jeffrey Howlett (or Howlet), sailed from Bristol on 22 July 1785. Brothers arrived at Cape Coast Castle on 16 September, and departed for Benin four days later. On 10 June 1786 she was "well" at Benin with 204 captives. She arrived at St Vincent on 18 January 1787 or 31 January with 220 captives. She sailed for Bristol on 7 March and arrived there on 2 May.

Brothers had left Bristol with 40 crew members. She enlisted six more while at Benin. She arrived at St Vincent with 18 crew members, and discharged eight there. She enlisted nine men before she left. She suffered two crew deaths on her way home.

In 1787, 32 of Brothers's 55 crew members died. This was the heaviest loss among 203 voyages from Bristol in that year to all destinations. Twenty-three vessels sailed from Bristol for West Africa and the West Indies, and they employed a total of 554 men; of these 554 men, 100 (approximately 18%), died. Death rates were highly variable across vessels: there were no deaths on seven voyages. If one removes Brothers from the calculation, the average death rate drops to a still high 12%. (Note: The death of 124 seamen from among the 2,838 employed on the 203 voyages gives a 4.5% death rate. The 55 voyages directly to the West Indies employed 1,151 crew members, 21 (5.5%) of whom died. The 125 voyages to other destinations employed 1,133 crew members, of whom only three died. The abolitionist Thomas Clarkson cited the death rate on Brothers as evidence for the deadliness of the slave trade. However, vessels that went to Africa for ivory, wood, and other African products suffered higher mortality rates as a consequence of their going up rivers into the interior of the country. All of these mortality figures are based on Muster Rolls. Vessels that did not return to Bristol as consequence of wrecking, foundering, fire, or explosion would not have provided Muster Rolls. In 1787, nine British enslaving ships were lost, though not all of these involved deaths among the crew. Still, the figures above on mortality levels and rates are therefore underestimates. The mortality among the crew of Brothers led to new laws governing seamen's diet and housing.)

2nd voyage transporting enslaved people (1787–1789): Captain Howlett sailed from Bristol on 6 July 1787. She was reported "well" at Anomaboe on 6 January 1788. She sailed from Cape Coast Castle on 22 July with 450 captives. She arrived at Grenada on 1 October. She left for Bristol on 6 November, and arrived there on 12 February 1789.

Brothers had left Bristol with 38 crew members. She arrived at Grenada with 27 of her original crew, and discharged three there; she also enlisted one man. Five men died on the homeward voyage, and she discharged four at Kinsale in January 1789. She arrived back at Bristol with 16 crew members.

Year	Master	Owner	Trade	Source & notes
1789	J.Howlett; D.Williams	Jones & Co.	Bristol–Africa	LR; almost rebuilt 1785

This voyage and the subsequent ones took place under the provisions of Dolben's Act. Dolben's Act limited the number of enslaved people that British slave ships were allowed to carry without penalty, based on the ships' tons burthen. It was the first British legislation passed to regulate shipping of captives.

In 1788–1789, James Jones, Thomas's owner, had nine enslaving vessels at sea or on the coast of Africa. He estimated that the Act reduced the number of captives his vessels were allowed to carry by a number equivalent to 23% of the pre-Act total. For Brothers, the estimate was a reduction of 84 captives, from 400 to 316, or 21%. Jones was using 190 tons as the basis for his estimate. For Brothers the cap would have been 334 at a burthen of 200 tons, or 336 at a burthen of 201 tons.

3rd voyage transporting enslaved people (1789–1790): Captain David Williams sailed from Bristol on 22 July 1789. (Note: Between 1789 and 1792, David Williams made three voyages as a master of enslaving ships, this being his first.) Brothers arrived at Cape Coast Castle on 5 September, and acquired captives at New Calabar. She arrived at St Vincent on 1 February 1790 with 310 captives. She sailed for Bristol on 22 March and arrived there on 7 May.

Brothers had left Bristol with 34 crew members. One man enlisted while she was on the African coast. She arrived at St Vincent with 24 crew members and discharged 11 there. She enlisted eight men before sailing. She returned to Bristol with 21 crew members.

Dolben's Act also provided for bonuses for master and surgeon for low mortality among the captives carried. Masters received a bonus of £100 if the mortality rate was under 2%; the ship's surgeon received £50. For a mortality rate between two and three per cent, the bonus was halved. There was no bonus if mortality exceeded 3%. Dolben's Act apparently resulted in some reduction in the numbers of slaves carried per vessel, and possibly in mortality.

4th voyage transporting enslaved people (1791): Captain Joseph Williams sailed from Bristol on 28 January 1791. (Note: Captain Joseph Williams made 11 enslaving voyages between 1785 and 1807; this made him the seventh-ranked captain in terms of voyages. He was master of six vessels, and had worked for four different shipowners. He first sailed out of Bristol and then out of Liverpool.) Brothers passed Cape Coast Castle on 28 March and was reported at Bonny in April. She embarked 279 captives and arrived at Grenada on 7 August. By one account 54 captives died on the voyage, for a mortality rate of 19%. (Another report states that 50 died, for a mortality rate of 18%.) Brothers arrived back at Bristol on 27 October.

Brothers had left Bristol with 29 crew members, and she had 26 when she arrived at Grenada. During the voyage home one crew member died.

5th voyage transporting enslaved people (1791–1792): Captain Williams sailed from Bristol on 18 December 1791. He began acquiring captives on 24 February 1792 at New Calabar. Brothers sailed from Africa on 18 May, having embarked 287 captives, and arrived at Kingston on 3 July with 253; this represented a 12% mortality rate. She sailed for Bristol on 2 August and arrived back there on 25 September.

6th voyage transporting enslaved people (1793–1794): War with France broke out in early 1793. Captain Joseph Williams acquired two letters of marque, one on 9 March 1793 and a second on 14 March. He sailed from Bristol on 30 March, and started acquiring captives on 16 August at New Calabar. Brothers sailed from Africa on 27 September and arrived at Kingston, Jamaica on 9 December. She had embarked 350 captives, and arrived with 314; this represented a 10% mortality rate. (Note: The number of captives embarked exceeded the Dolben Act cap; the number who survived did not.) She sailed from Kingston on 10 March 1794 and arrived back at Bristol on 21 April.

Year	Master	Owner	Trade	Source & notes
1794	J.Barr	Jones & Co.	Bristol–Africa	LR; almost rebuilt 1785, new wales 1790, and good repair 1794

7th voyage transporting enslaved people (1794-loss): Captain James Barr sailed from Bristol on 15 October 1794.

== Fate ==
A French squadron captured Nassau, Williams, master, in December 1794, and Brothers, Barr (or Bar), master, at Bonny and burnt them. She had not yet embarked any captves.

In 1794, 25 British enslaving ships were lost, of which 18 were lost on their way to Africa. This was the highest loss of vessels on their way to Africa in the entire 1793–1807 period; only three vessels were lost on the coast. Next year was even worse for owners of enslaving ships – 50 were lost in total, with 40 being lost on the coast. It was also the worst year for owners in the entire 1793–1807 period.
