= International African American Museum =

Museum in Charleston, South Carolina, USA

Coordinates: 32°47′19″N 79°55′34″W

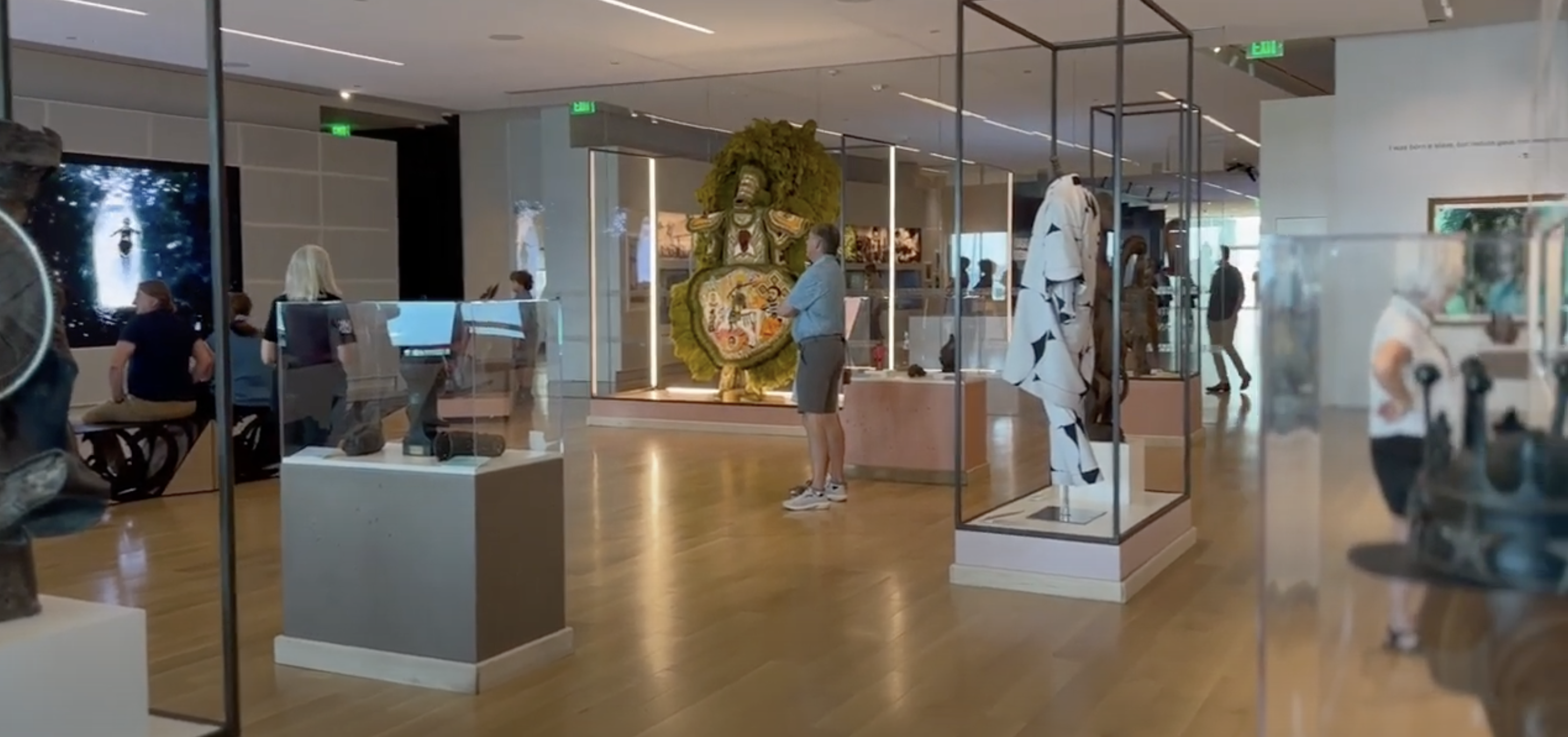
- Established: June 27, 2023; 3 years ago
- Location: 14 Wharfside Street, Charleston, South Carolina
- Type: History museum and Art museum
- Visitors: 187,657 (2024)
- President: Tonya M. Matthews, Ph.D.
- Website: https://iaamuseum.org/

The International African American Museum (IAAM) is a museum of African-American history in Charleston, South Carolina, located at a former shipping wharf where approximately 40% of the nation's enslaved persons disembarked. The museum opened in 2023 after 20 years of planning. All leaders and staff were furloughed in 2026.

== History ==
The idea of the museum was initiated by former Charleston Mayor Joseph P. Riley Jr. The city had previously sold the land to a restaurateur, but after construction on the site discovered traces of Gadsden's Wharf, Riley decided to repurchase the land.

The construction budget of the museum is $75 million. Riley raised money for the project as a private citizen. The $25 million private donation goal was met in 2018. The South Carolina General Assembly delayed a $25 million contribution to the project, which delayed construction of the 40,000-square-foot facility.

The city of North Charleston donated $1 million to the project. Keith Sumney, the mayor of North Charleston, stated that he hoped the museum would include an exhibit on Liberty Hill, a historically black neighborhood in North Charleston.

The design architect is Harry Cobb, of Pei Cobb Freed & Partners, working in collaboration with Moody Nolan architectural firm of Columbus, Ohio; the exhibition designer is Ralph Appelbaum Associates and the landscape designer is Walter Hood, of Oakland, California. The museum was built on the Cooper River, with a view towards Fort Sumter and out to the Atlantic Ocean. Its first CEO was Michael B. Moore.

The museum opened in 2023 with presentations made at the dedication ceremony by former Charleston mayors Joseph P. Riley Jr and John Tecklenburg, Phylicia Rashad, Congressman Jim Clyburn, State Senator Darrell Jackson, State Representative JA Moore, gospel singer Bebe Winans, poet Nikky Finney, anthropologist Johnnetta Cole, former NASA Administrator Charles Bolden, IAAM President Dr. Tonya Matthews and others.

In 2026, all of the museum's leaders and staff were furloughed due to financial struggles.
