= Speculum (medicine) =

Medical device for investigating body orifices by direct vision

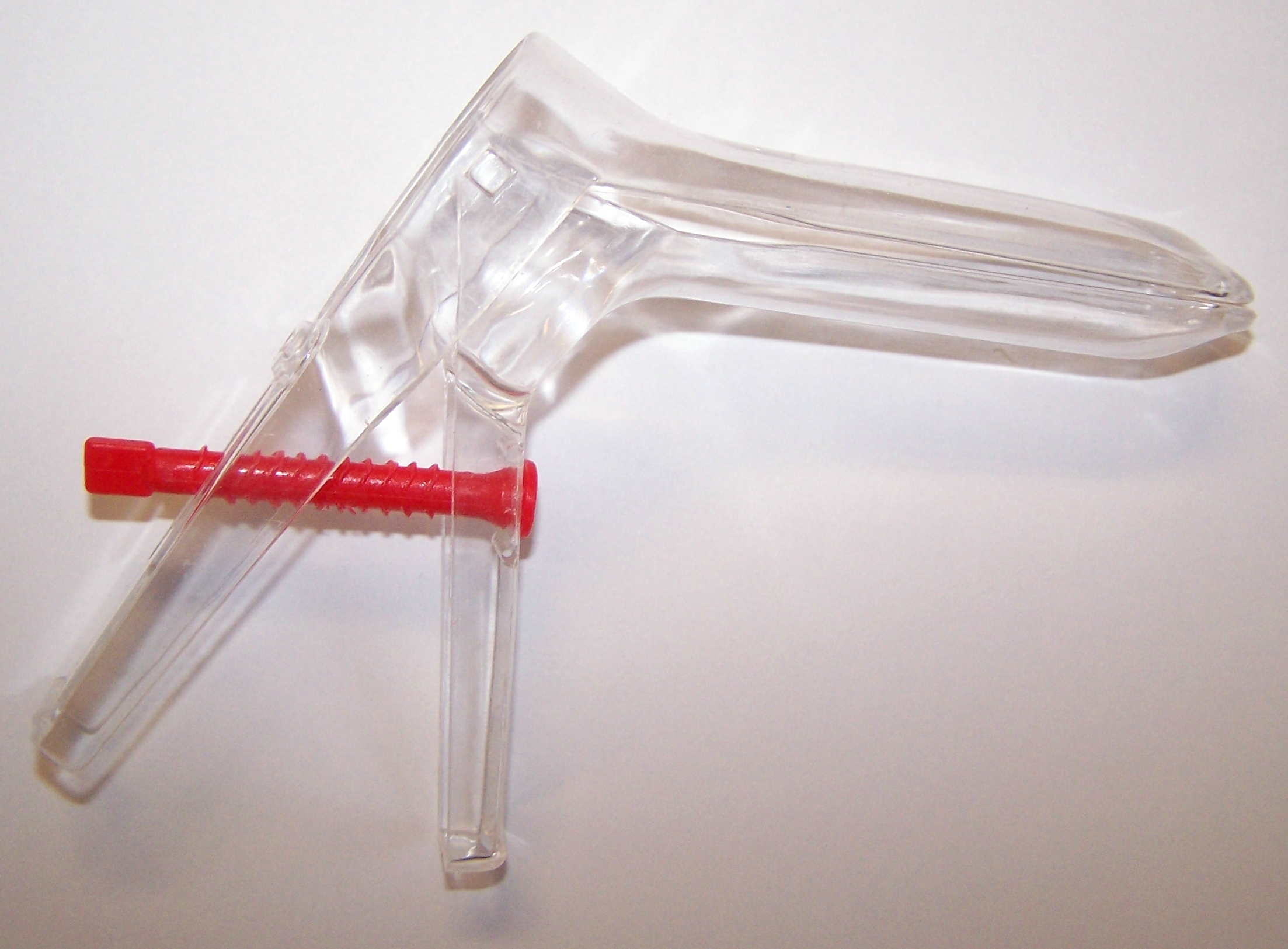
A disposable bivalved plastic vaginal speculum

A speculum (Latin for 'mirror'; pl.: specula or speculums) is a medical tool for investigating body orifices, with a form dependent on the orifice for which it is designed. In old texts, the speculum may also be referred to as a diopter or dioptra. Like an endoscope, a speculum allows a view inside the body; endoscopes, however, tend to have optics while a speculum is intended for direct vision.

== History ==
=== History of instrument ===
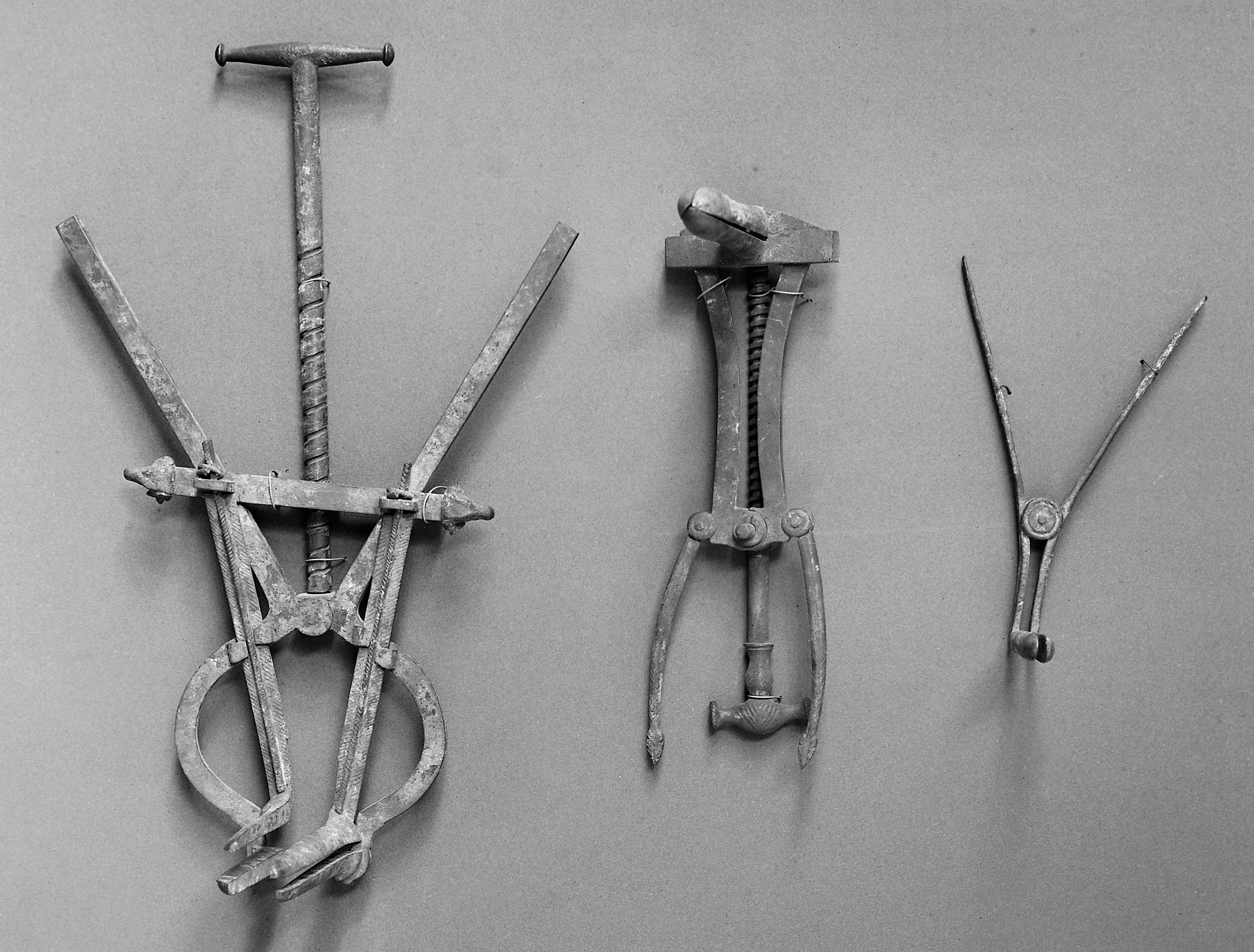
Three types of ancient Roman specula c. 50 AD.

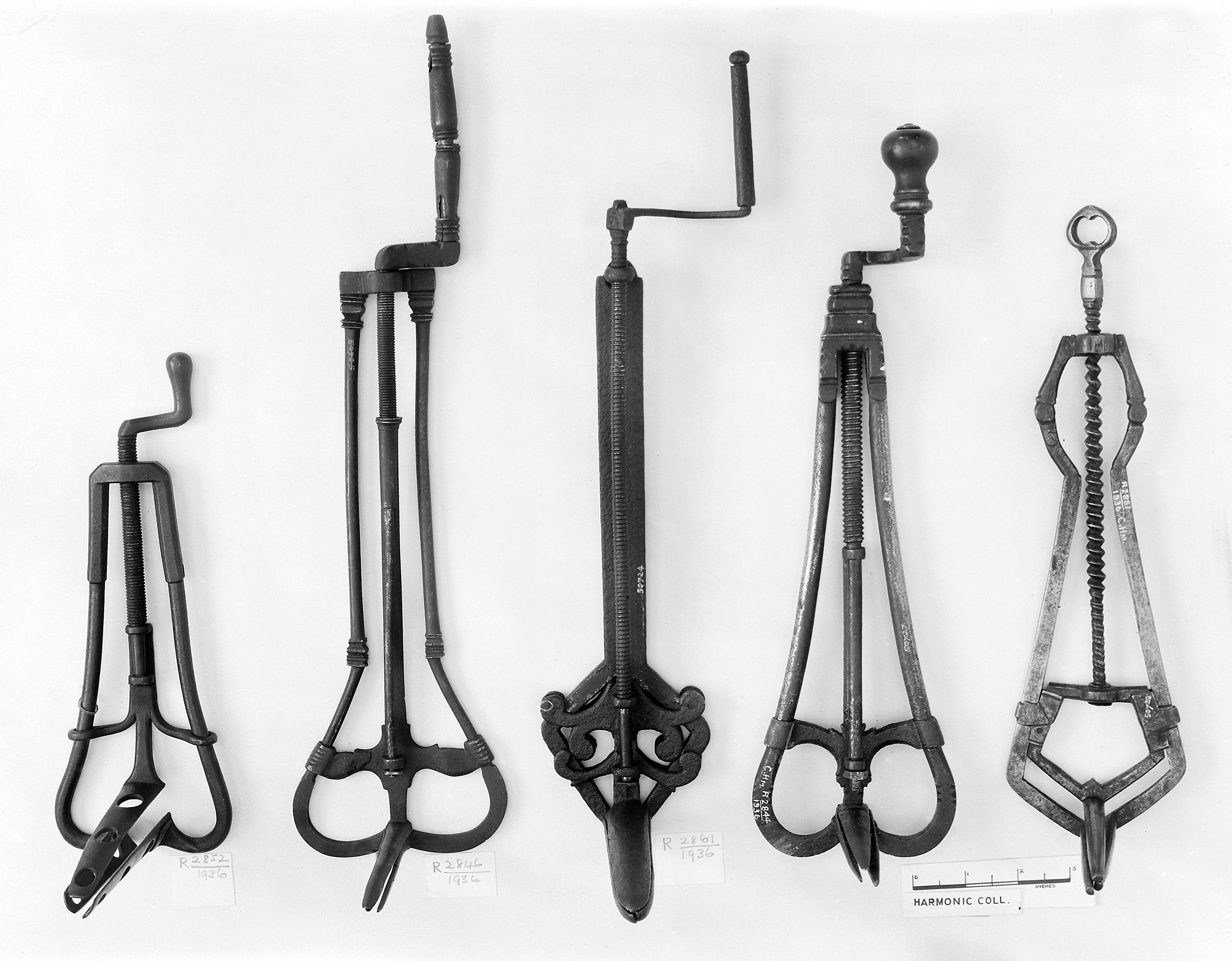
14th, 15th and 16th century specula

Vaginal and anal specula were used by the ancient Greeks and Romans, and speculum artifacts have been found in Pompeii.

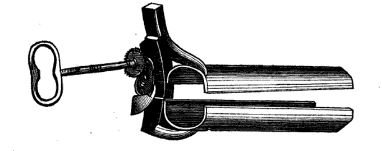
Boivin's speculum

A more modern vaginal speculum was developed by Marie Boivin (1773–1841), a French midwife, inventor, and obstetrics writer who has been called one of the most important women in medicine in the 19th century.

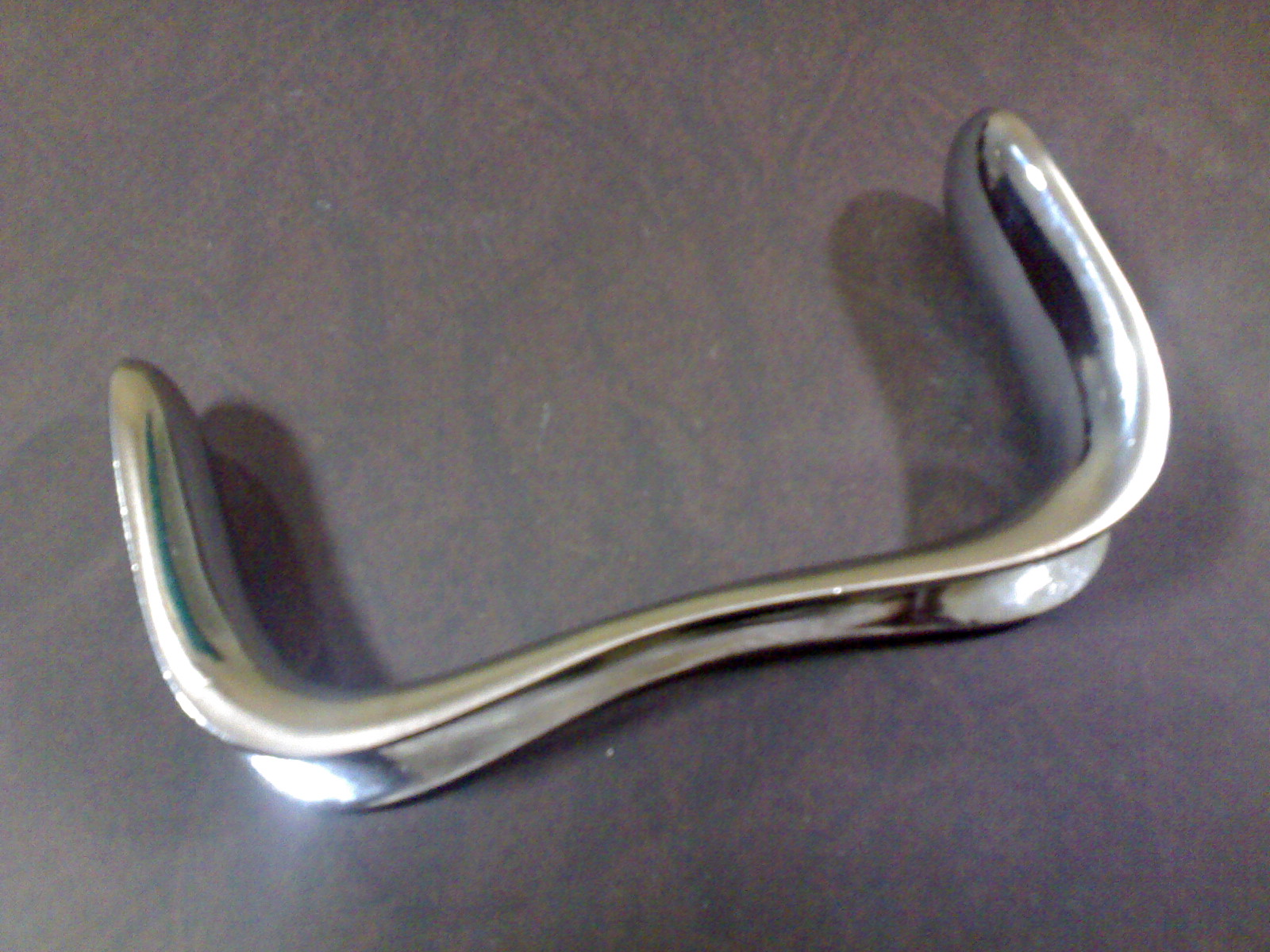
Sims' vaginal speculum (stainless steel)

Another vaginal speculum was developed by J. Marion Sims, a plantation doctor in Lancaster County, South Carolina. Between 1845 and 1849, Sims performed dozens of surgeries, without anesthesia, on at least 12 enslaved women. In these experiments, Sims developed a technique to repair fistula and in the process invented the Sims' vaginal speculum. These experiments, and the development of the modern specula, led some to regard Sims as the "father of modern gynaecology." The Sims speculum was originally made from a pewter spoon bent into a shape similar to the beak of a duck. It had no hinges or screws.

The modern two-billed (bivalve) speculum was invented by Edward Gabriel Cusco in 1870, the Cusco's speculum. This speculum consists of a hollow cylinder with a rounded end that is divided into two hinged parts. This speculum is inserted into the vagina to dilate it for examination of the vagina and cervix. T.W. Graves combined the Cusco design with Sims' duckbill shape, producing Graves' duckbilled speculum, the design most commonly used today.

=== History of use ===
By the 1860s, specula were integrated into criminal justice practices in the UK. In Great Britain, examinations of the cervix were made mandatory for all women convicted of prostitution by the country's Contagious Disease Act. In the 19th century, the vaginal speculum became a cultural symbol of the tenuous relationship between women and their physicians. Use of the speculum was generally avoided in medical practices, and most vaginal conditions were diagnosed through symptoms or palpating the abdomen. Many practitioners had moral concerns about the use of the speculum, and preferred to diagnose through palpating the abdomen. As late as 1910, physicians believed the vaginal speculum to be inferior to the "educated touch."

These concerns continued into the early 20th century as the speculum became commonplace in gynecology practices. Often, nurses played a major role in ensuring the proper use of the speculum during medical exams. The 1946 and 1956 editions of a multi-volume gynecology text for nurses required that nurses remain present during examination to protect both the patient and physician from "blackmail by designing persons."

As of 2015, 85% of gynecologists are women. As a result of this demographic shift, the procedures around speculum use have also changed.

== Construction ==
Specula have been made of glass or metal. They were generally made of stainless steel and sterilized between uses, but particularly in the 21st century, many — especially those used in emergency departments and doctor's offices — are made of plastic, and are disposable, single-use items. Those used in surgical suites are still commonly made of stainless steel.

== Types ==
Specula come in a variety of shapes based on their purpose, and a variety of sizes; in any case the cylinder or bill(s) of the instrument allow the operator a direct vision of the area of interest and the possibility to introduce instruments for further interventions such as a biopsy.

=== Vaginal ===
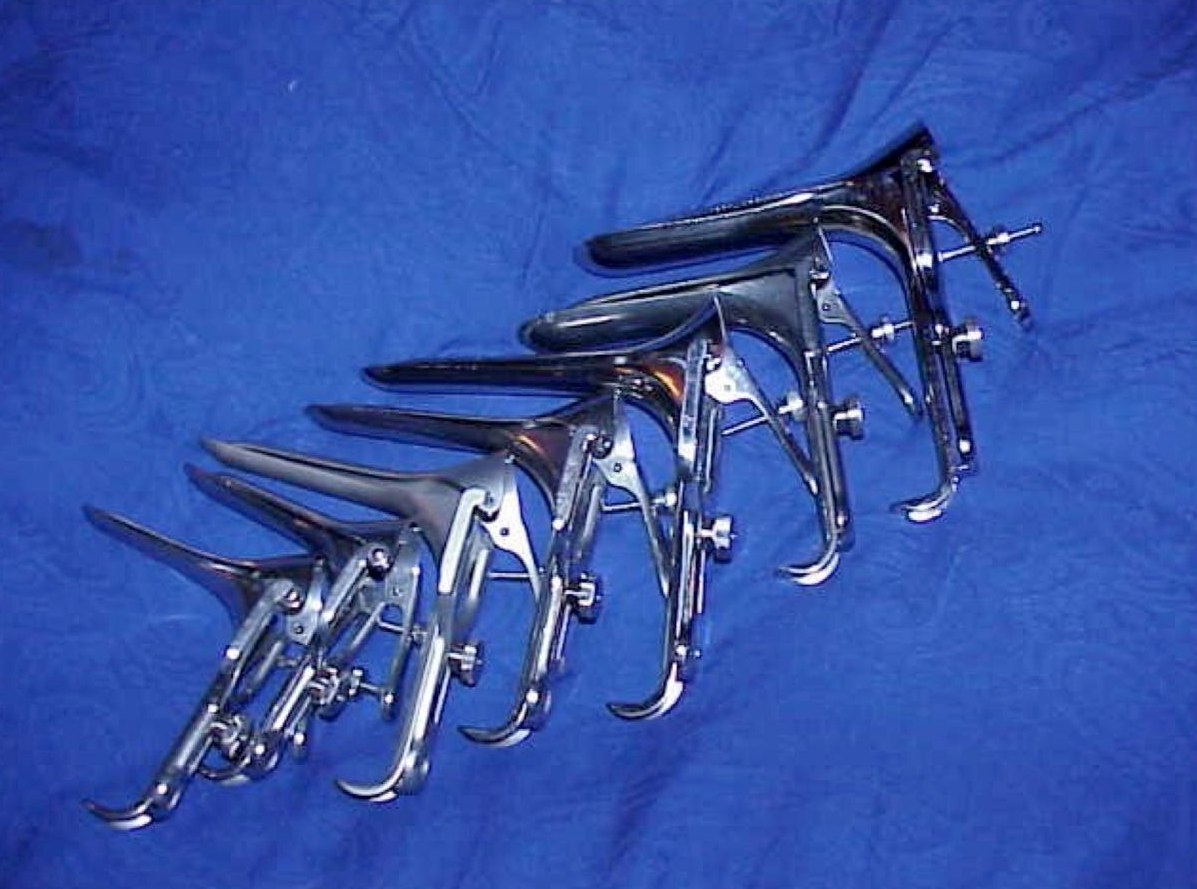
Different sizes and shapes of specula commonly used in gynecology

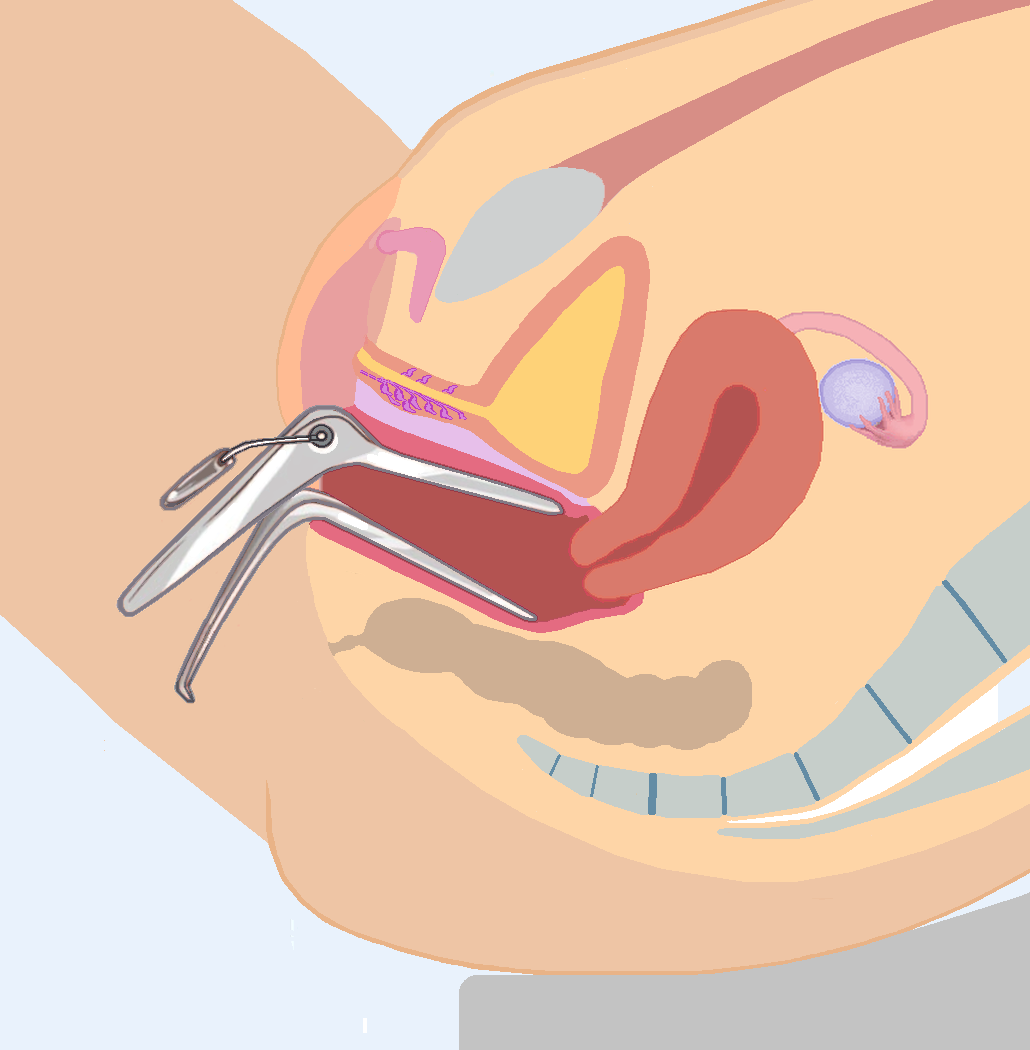
Position of the opened speculum during vaginal examination

The most common specula used in gynecologic practice are varying sizes of bivalved vaginal speculum; the two bills are hinged and are "closed" when the speculum is inserted to facilitate its entry and "opened" in its final position where they can be arrested by a screw mechanism, so that the operator is freed from keeping the bills apart.

A specialized form of vaginal speculum is the weighted speculum, which consists of a broad half tube which is bent at about a 90-degree angle, with the channel of the tube on the exterior side of the angle. One end of the tube has a roughly spherical metal weight surrounding the channel of the speculum. A weighted speculum is placed in the vagina during vaginal surgery with the patient in the lithotomy position. The weight holds the speculum in place and frees the surgeon's hands for other tasks.

A vaginal speculum is also used in fertility treatments, particularly artificial insemination, and allows the vaginal cavity to be opened and observed thereby facilitating the deposit of semen into the vagina.

==== Cylindrical shape ====
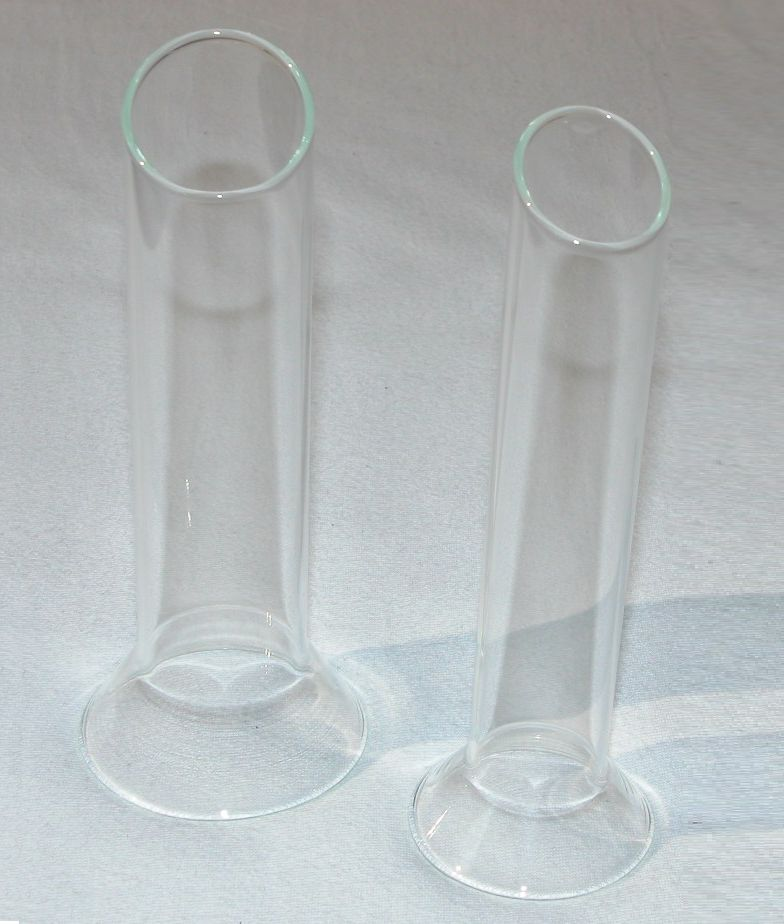
Two cylindrical-shaped glass specula

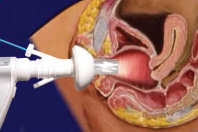
Veda-scope inflating vagina and light illuminating (cervical brush inserts through top inlet)

- Ferguson
- Glass speculum
- Veda-scope (dilating vaginal speculum): introduced in 2001 by Clemens van der Weegen, it inflates the vagina with filtered air. It is designed for both the pap smear procedure (with a cervical brush or a cytology brush) and to work as an internal colposcope for cervical screening by visual inspection, using acetic acid or iodine solution to highlight abnormal (precancerous) areas. It features an internal light source with multi-coloured light filters. It also has a facility to attach a digital camera for viewing and recording.

==== One bill ====
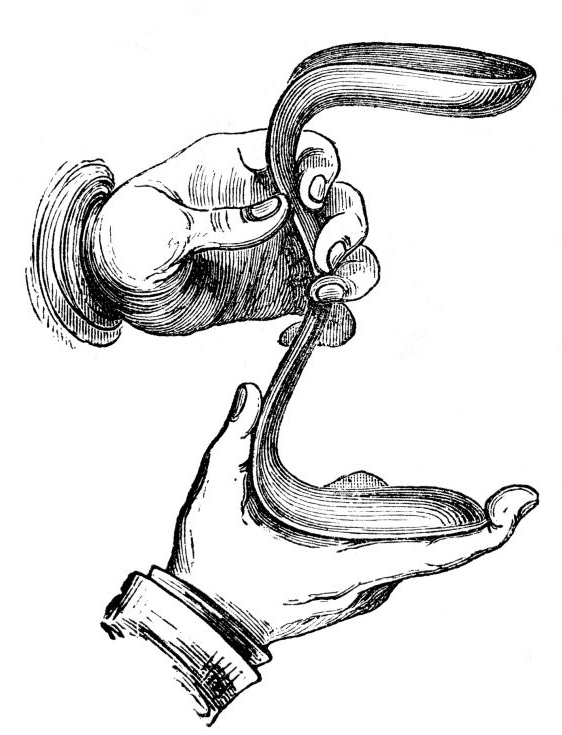
The single-billed Sims speculum is still in use today.

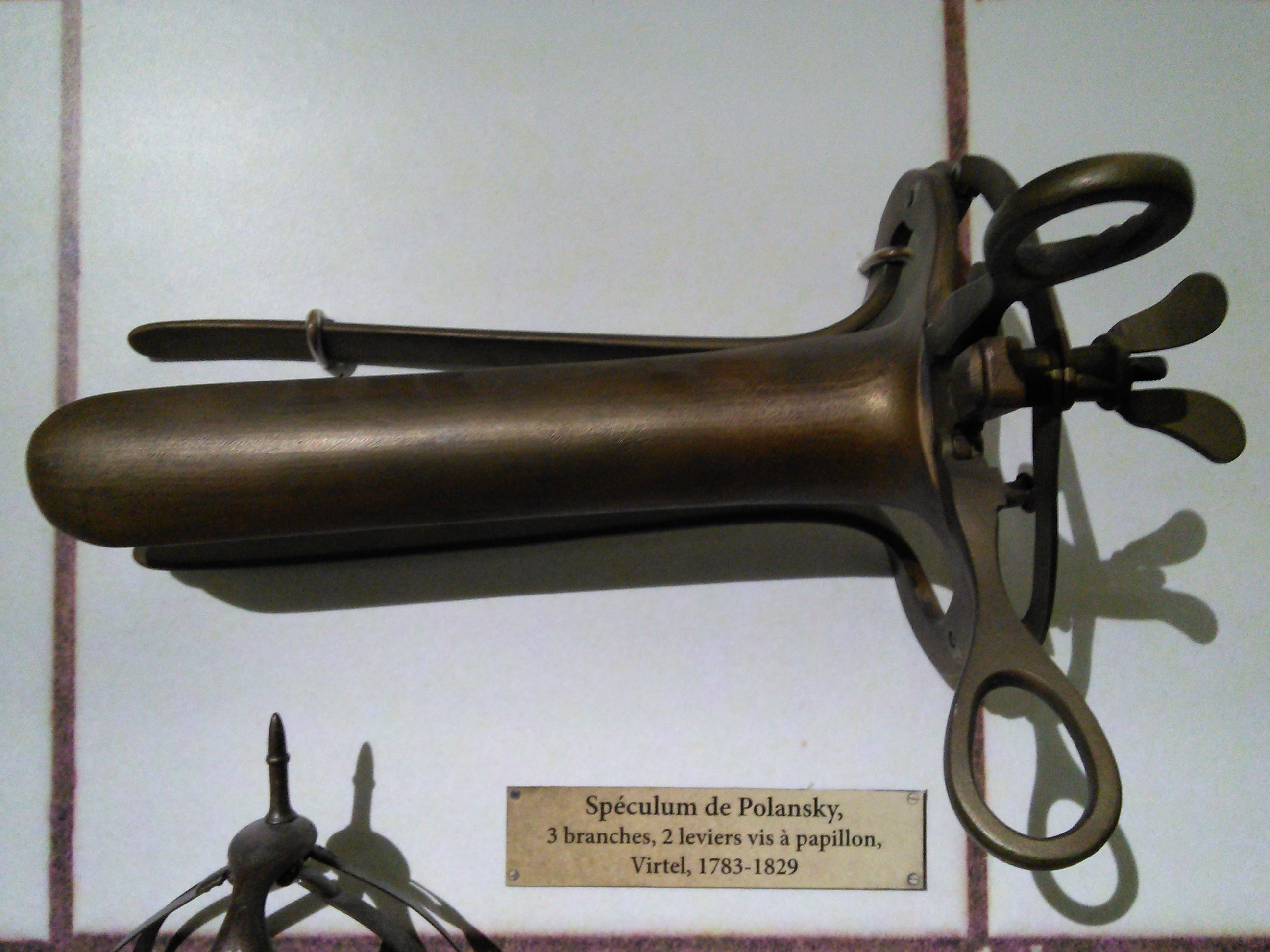
Speculum of Polansky

- Auvard
- Breisky
- Doyen
- Eastman
- Jackson
- Kallmorgen
- Kristeller
- Landau
- Martin
- Mathieu
- Polansky
- Samuel
- Scherbak
- Sims
- Weissbarth

==== Two bills (bivalved) ====
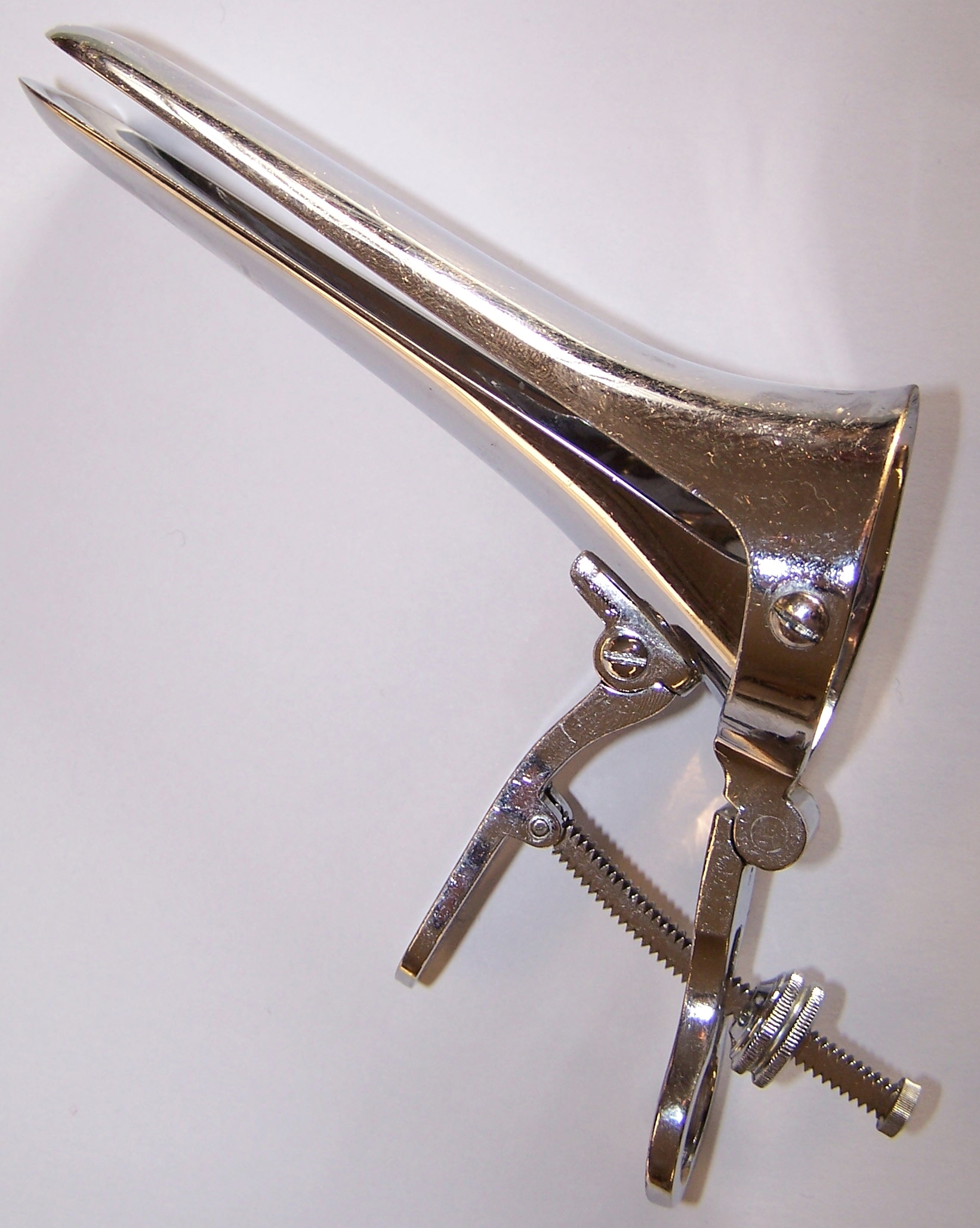
Duckbill shape of a two-billed speculum

- Collin
- Cusco
- DeVilbiss
- Graves
- Huffman
- Pederson
- Semm
- Seyffert
- Trelat
- Winterton

==== Three bills ====
- Guttmann
- Nott
- O'Sullivan-O'Connor
- Polansky (veterinary use)

=== Rectal ===
Vaginal specula are also used for anal surgery, although several other forms of anal specula exist. One form, the anoscope, resembles a tube that has a removable bullet-shaped insert. When the anoscope is inserted into the anus, the insert dilates the anus to the diameter of the tube. The insert is then removed, leaving the tube to allow examination of the lower rectum and anus.

This style of anal speculum is one of the oldest designs for surgical instruments still in use, with examples dating back many centuries. The sigmoidoscope can be further advanced into the lower intestinal tract and requires an endoscopic set-up.

==== Tubal shape ====
- Aniscope

==== One bill ====
- Czerny

==== Two bills ====
- Barr
- Bodenhamer
- Killian
- Pratt
- Ricord
- Roschke
- Sims
- Smith-Buie

==== Three bills ====
- Alan Park
- Cook
- Mathieu

=== Nasal ===
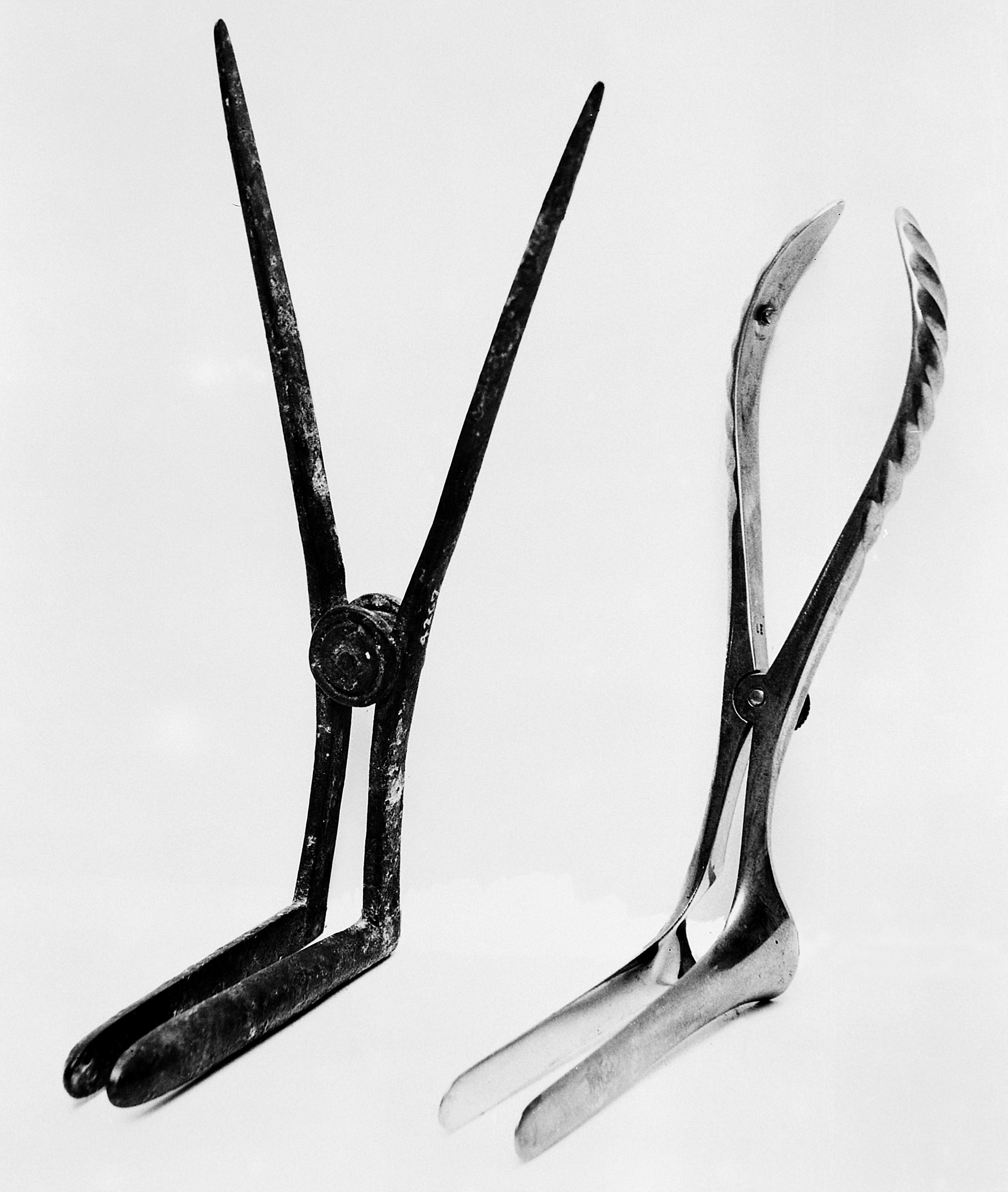
Two examples of nasal specula: ancient and modern

Nasal specula have two relatively flat bills with handle. The instrument is hinged so that when the handles are squeezed together the bills spread laterally, allowing examination.

- Killian
- Cottle
- Vienna
- Voltolini
- Yankauer

Additionally, the Thudichum nasal speculum is commonly used in the outpatient examination of the nose.

=== Aural ===
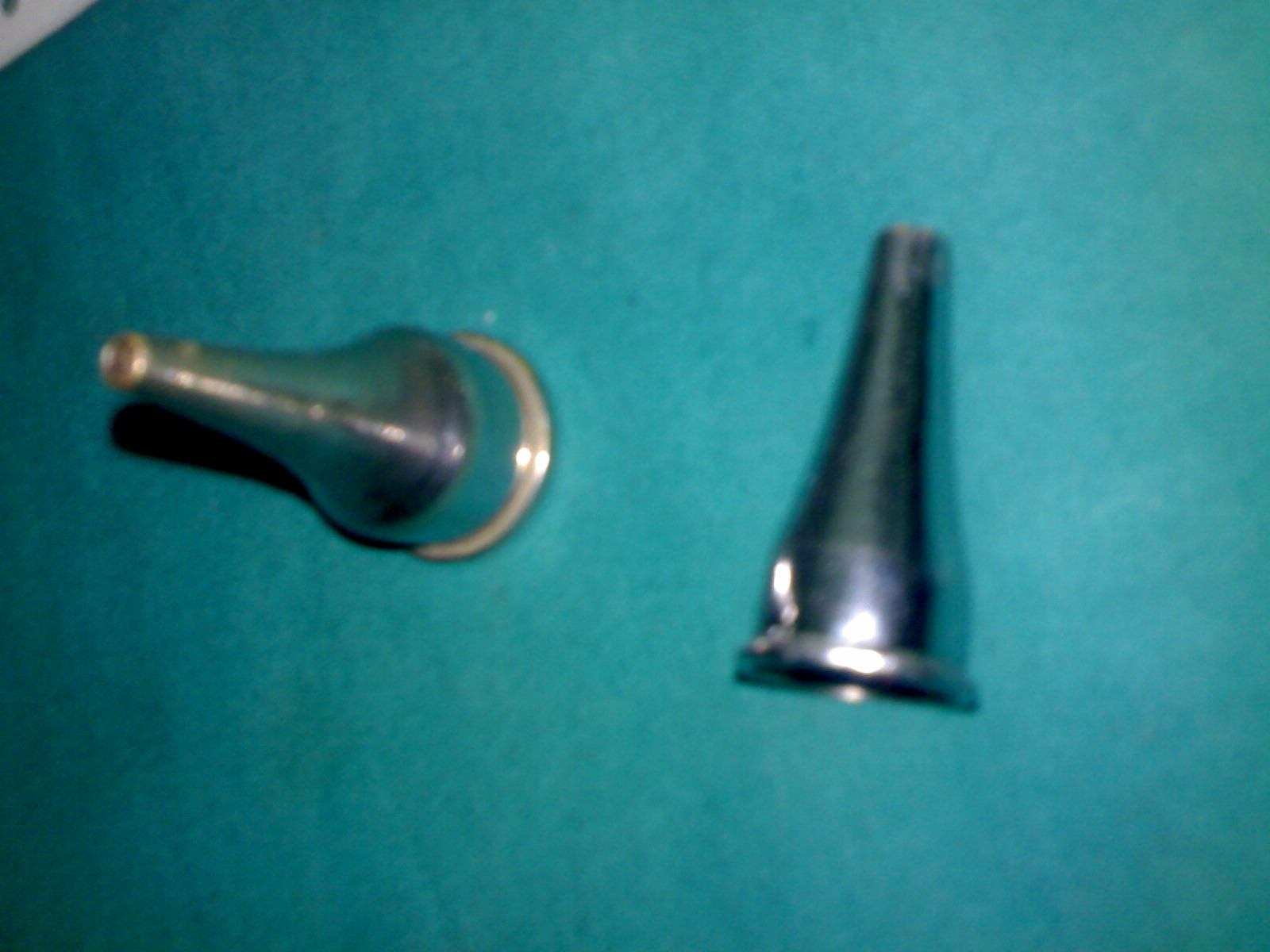
Ear specula are funnel-shaped.

Ear or aural specula resemble a funnel, and come in a variety of sizes.

- Aural Speculum
- Farrior Ear Speculum

=== Eyelid ===
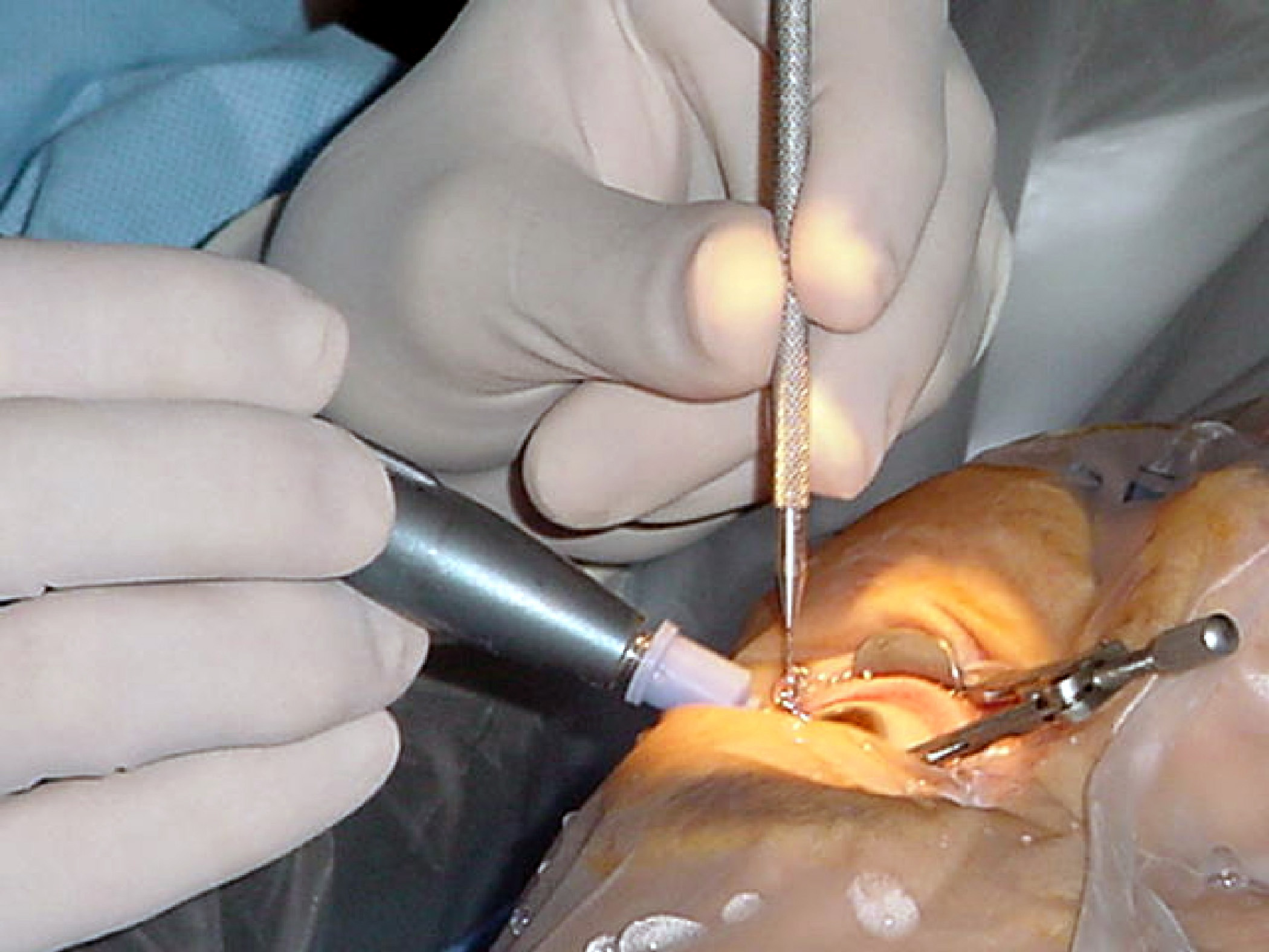
Eyelid speculum (right) in use during cataract surgery

For ophthalmic surgery such as cataract surgery, a speculum designed to retract the eyelids is used.

=== Oral ===
In veterinary medicine, a McPherson Speculum can be used for oral examination. The speculum helps keep the mouth open during the exam and helps avoid biting injuries.

== Non-medical use ==
Specula are used for sexual pleasure, both vaginally and anally.

== See also ==
- Endoscope – Medical instrument
- Colposcope – Medical examination of the cervix
- Vaginal dilator – Medical instrument used to stretch the vagina
