= Nassau (1784 ship) =

British merchant and slave ship (1784–1794)

History

Great Britain
- Name: Nassau
- Namesake: Nassau, Bahamas
- Launched: 1784, New Providence
- Fate: Burnt 1794

General characteristics
- Tons burthen: 160, or 197 (bm)

Nassau was launched at New Providence in 1784. From 1785 to 1792 she sailed from London to New Providence, Philadelphia, Jamaica, Smyrna, and Quebec. A new owner in 1792 moved her registration and homeport to Bristol to sail her as a slave ship in the triangular trade in enslaved people. She made one complete slave trading voyage. A French squadron captured and burnt her in 1794 as she was on her way to Africa on her second such voyage.

== Career ==
Nassau, Hunt, master, first appeared in Lloyd's List in 1785 when she arrived at Gravesend, Kent, from New Providence on 27 February.

Nassau first appeared in Lloyd's Register (LR), in 1786.

Year	Master	Owner	Trade	Source
1786	J.Hunt	Brickwood	London–Providence; London–Philadelphia	LR
1787	J.Hunt	Brickwood	London–Philadelphia	LR; mahogany & cedar
1789	J.Hunt	Brickwood	Jamaica–London	LR; raised and new deck 1788, mahogany & cedar
1791	T.Tierney	Brickwood	London–Smyrna	LR; raised and new deck 1788, mahogany & cedar
1792	Pridgeon; M.Morley	Backwood; J.Jones	London–Quebec; Bristol–Africa	LR; raised and new deck 1788
1793	M.Morley	J.Jones	Bristol–Africa	LR; raised and new deck 1788, & repairs 1792

1st slave voyage (1792–1794): Captain Matthew Morley sailed from Bristol on 25 October 1792. Nassau began acquiring captives on 12 March 1793. She acquired captives in the Sierra Leone estuary, at Iles de Los, and at Bance Island. In all, she acquired 202 captives, but re-landed eleven men and one woman before she sailed on 9 June with 190 captives. She arrived at Kingston, Jamaica on 15 July with 189 captives; one boy had died on the voyage.

After the passage in 1788 of Dolben's Act, masters received a bonus of £100 for a mortality rate of under 2%; the ship's surgeon received £50. For a mortality rate between two and three per cent, the bonus was halved. There was no bonus if mortality exceeded 3%. (Note: At the time the monthly wage for a captain of an enslaving ship out of Bristol was £5 per month. That said, masters and surgeons received most of their income in the form of "coast commissions", based on the total number of captives they delivered, plus the income of the sale of two (or more) privilege captives.)

Nassau sailed from Kingston on 17 November 1793 and arrived back at Bristol on 17 January 1794.

Nassau had left Bristol with 30 crew members and returned with 18. She had arrived at Jamaica with 26 and once there had discharged 14 between 15 July and 2 August. She enlisted nine new crew members on 17 November. She stopped in Ireland before arriving in Bristol and in Ireland she discharged three crew members. She therefore arrived with 18 crew members.

Year	Master	Owner	Trade	Source
1795	Williams	J.Jones	Bristol–Africa	LR; raised and new deck 1788, & repairs 1792 & 1794

2nd enslaving voyage (1794–loss ): Nassau, David Williams, master sailed from Bristol on 18 August 1794, bound for Africa and Jamaica.

== Fate ==
A French squadron captured Nassau, Williams, master, in December 1794, and Brothers, Bar, master, at Bonny and burnt them.

In 1794, 25 British enslaving ships were lost, of which 18 were lost on their way to Africa. This was the highest loss of vessels on their way to Africa in the entire 1793–1807 period; only three vessels were lost on the coast. Next year was even worse for owners of enslaving ships – 50 were lost in total, with 40 being lost on the coast. It was also the worst year for owners in the entire 1793–1807 period.
