= Gadsden's Wharf =

Former wharf in Charleston, South Carolina known for its role in slave trade

Coordinates: 32.7886791°N 79.9257962°W

Gadsden's Wharf is a wharf located in Charleston, South Carolina. It was the first destination for an estimated 100,000 enslaved Africans during the peak of the international slave trade. Some researchers have estimated that 40% of the enslaved Africans in the United States landed at Gadsden's Wharf. At one point, the wharf was the largest in America. The wharf is now home to the South Carolina Aquarium, the Fort Sumter Visitor Education Center, and the International African American Museum which opened in 2023.

== Construction of the wharf and importation of enslaved people ==
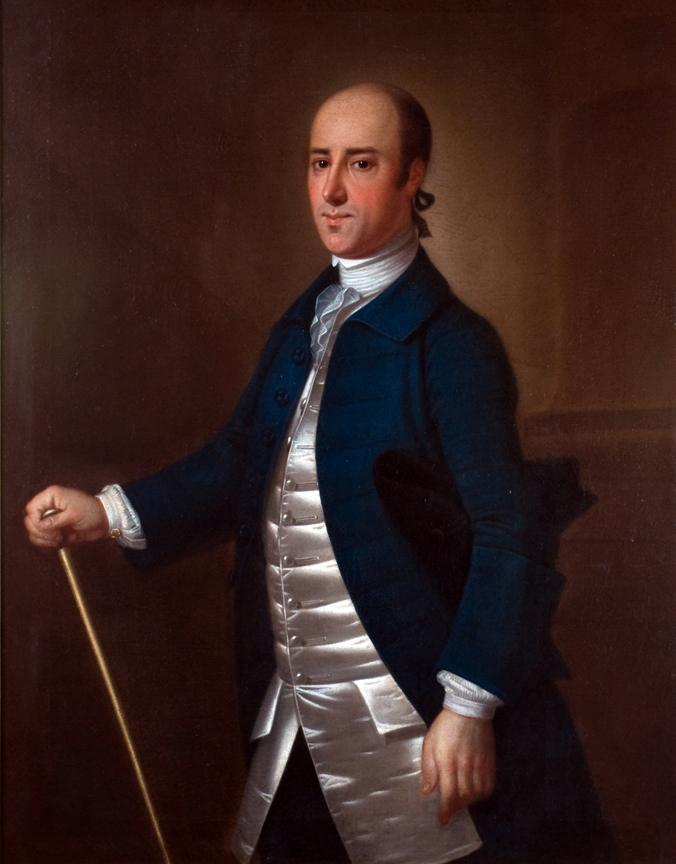
Christopher Gadsden, owner of Gadsden's Wharf

Christopher Gadsden began constructing the Wharf in the late 1760s. In the years following, Gadsden expanded it, repaired it, and updated it until the break out of the American Revolution. In March of 1787, the South Carolina General Assembly prohibited slave importation for three years. In 1800, the Assembly extended the ban until 1803. Between 1803 and 1805, approximately 80 ships brought in over 14,000 people. In 1806, the first newspaper ads featuring enslaved Africans for sale at Gadsden’s Wharf appeared. Later the same year, on February 17, 1806, the city of Charleston passed an ordinance that all vessels carrying enslaved peoples had to land at Gadsden’s Wharf.

On January 1, 1808, a congressional ban on slave imports took effect and Gadsden’s Wharf was put to other uses, though enslavers continued to trade in human beings until the 1860s.

== Site of the International African American Museum ==
Long time mayor of Charleston, Joe Riley, first mentioned plans for a museum dedicated to the history of African Americans in Charleston. Nearly 20 years later, an October groundbreaking ceremony was celebrated after reaching their $100 million campaign goal. Early advocates for the museum also include Congressmen Jim Clyburn, and now retired College of Charleston professor of history. Retired College of Charleston professor Bernard Powers was named the interim CEO of the International African American Museum.
