= Stanton (surname) =

Stanton is an English toponymic surname.

== Etymology and history ==
The name Stanton is derived from Old English term "stan" "stone" and "tun" "enclosure" or "settlement". Many places took on the name Stanton, like Stanton Harcourt in Oxfordshire, and Stanton Drew in Somerset, close to the Neolithic Stanton Drew stone circles.

Many variants of the spellings Stanton, Stainton, Stinton or Staunton, are recorded in the Domesday Book of 1086 AD, and the surname can be found in England, Scotland, Ireland and their diaspora, which includes America.

Notable people with the surname include:

=== A ===
- Alfred John Stanton (1825–1906), British politician
- Alice Stanton (born 1960), Irish cricketer
- Allen Stanton (1924–2015), American music executive and record producer
- Alysa Stanton (born 1963), American Reform rabbi
- Amanda Stanton (born 1990), American actress, reality TV star and blogger
- Amy Stanton, English lawn and indoor bowler
- Andrew Stanton (born 1965), American filmmaker
- Andy Stanton (born 1973), British children's author (Mr Gum)
- Angela Stanton-King (born 1977), American author and conservative speaker
- Arabella Stanton (born 2013/4), British actress
- Arthur Stanton (1892–1915), English footballer
- Arthur Stanton (priest) (1839–1913), English Anglican cleric

=== B ===
- Barry Stanton (actor) (born 1940), British stage, film and television actor
- Barry Stanton (musician) (1941–2018), Australian rock and roll singer
- Benjamin Stanton (1809–1872), American politician
- Bill Stanton (footballer) (1890–1977), English footballer
- Bill Stanton (gridiron football) (1924–2010), Canadian football player
- Billy Stanton (1904–1995), Irish hurler
- Blair Hughes-Stanton (1902–1981), English wood-engraver
- Bob Stanton (golfer) (born 1946), Australian golfer
- Brandon Stanton (born 1984), American blogger and photographer
- Brent Stanton (born 1986), Australian rules footballer
- Brian Stanton (footballer) (born 1956), English footballer
- Brian Stanton (high jumper) (born 1961), American high jumper
- Bruce Stanton (born 1957), Canadian politician
- Buck Stanton (1906–1992), American baseball player
- Buck Stanton (Jesuit) (1870–1909), American entomologist at Manila Observatory

=== C ===
- Charles Stanton (1873–1946), British politician
- Charles E. Stanton (1858–1933), United States Army officer
- Charles H. Stanton (1838–1913), American farmer and politician
- Charles Lenard Stanton (1919–1942), Australian private who was killed in the Ration Truck massacre
- Charles T. Stanton (1839–1915), Adjutant General of the State of Connecticut
- Cheryl Stanton, American lawyer and government official
- Christine Stanton (born 1959), Australian high jumper
- Cliff Stanton (1895–1979), English footballer
- Cornelius Stanton (1799–1866), Northumbrian piper
- Craig Stanton (born 1960), American race car driver and cyclist

=== D ===
- Danny Stanton (1896–1943), American mobster and racketeer
- Darrell Stanton, American professional skateboarder
- David Stanton (politician) (born 1957), Irish politician
- David Stanton (priest) (born 1960), British Anglican priest, Archdeacon of Westminster
- David L. Stanton (1840–1919), American Union Army general
- Dave Stanton, American motorcycle racer
- Domna C. Stanton, American academic
- Doug Stanton, American journalist and author
- Drew Stanton (born 1984), American football player
- Dustin Stanton (born 1994), American football player

=== E ===
- Edith Stanton (1875–1962), American teacher, journalist and author
- Edmund C. Stanton (1854–1901), American opera and theatre manager
- Edward Stanton (British Army officer) (1827–1907), British Army general and diplomat
- Edward Stanton (politician) (died 1705), speaker of the House of Assembly of Jamaica, 1704
- Edward Stanton (sculptor) (1681–1734), English stonemason, builder and sculptor
- Edward L. Stanton III (born 1972), American attorney
- Edwin Stanton (1814–1869), American lawyer and politician, US Secretary of War during the Civil War
- Edwin L. Stanton (1842–1877), American lawyer and politician, son of Edwin Stanton
- Elizabeth Cady Stanton (1815–1902), American writer and women's rights leader
- Elizabeth Stanton (Massachusetts politician) (1909–1982), American politician
- Elizabeth Stanton (television host) (born 1995), American television host
- Eric Stanton (1926–1999), American graphic artist
- Ernie Stanton (1890–1944), English-American actor, manager and athlete

=== F ===
- Fox Stanton (1874–1946), American college football player and coach
- Frank Stanton (entrepreneur) (1921–1999), American real-estate investor and pioneer in audio and video cassette systems
- Frank Stanton (executive) (1908–2006), American broadcasting executive
- Frank Stanton (rugby league) (born 1940), Australian rugby league footballer and coach
- Frank Lebby Stanton (1857–1927), American lyricist
- Fred R. Stanton (1881–1925), American actor
- Frederick Stanton (RAF officer) (1895–1979), British World War I flying ace
- Frederick Lester Stanton (1873–1945), American orthodontist
- Frederick P. Stanton (1814–1894), American politician in the 19th century
- Fredrik Stanton (born 1973), American author, political scientist and filmmaker

=== G ===
- Gabrielle Stanton, American television writer and producer
- George Stanton (1835–1905), English Anglican bishop
- George Clark Stanton (1832–1894), Scottish sculptor, silversmith and portrait miniaturist
- George W. Stanton (1903–1952), American politician
- Gertrude Stanton (1863-1931), American optometrist
- Giancarlo Stanton (born 1989), American baseball player
- Glenn Stanton (1895–1969), American architect
- Graham Stanton (1940–2009), New Zealand biblical scholar
- Greg Stanton (born 1970), American lawyer and politician
- Gregory Stanton, American jurist and activist in the area of genocide studies

=== H ===
- Hannah Stanton (1913–1993), British social worker and anti-apartheid activist
- Hank Stanton (1920–1975), American football player
- Harris Stanton (born 1978), American comedian
- Harry Dean Stanton (1926–2017), American actor
- Hayden Stanton (1898–1960), Canadian politician
- Helene Stanton (1925–2017), American singer and actress
- Henry Stanton (Oz), character in the HBO drama Oz
- Henry Stanton (soldier) (c.1796–1856), U.S. brevet brigadier general
- Henry Brewster Stanton (1805–1887), American anti-slavery activist and politician
- Henry Thompson Stanton (1834–1899), American poet
- Henry de Stanton, 13th-century English canon law jurist and judge
- Herbert Hughes-Stanton (1870–1937), British watercolour and oil painter
- Hervey de Stanton (1260–1327), English judge

=== I ===
- Ian Stanton (1950–1998), British singer-songwriter and disability rights activist

=== J ===
- James Stanton V (1771–1829), namesake of Stantonsburg, North Carolina
- James Stanton (water polo) (born 1983), Australian water polo goalkeeper
- James M. Stanton (born 1946), American Episcopalian bishop
- James V. Stanton (born 1932), U.S. representative from Ohio
- Jamie Stanton (born 1995), Australian rules footballer
- Jamie Stanton (alpine skier) (born 1994), American Paralympic alpine skier
- Jeff Stanton (born 1968), American motocross racer
- Jessie Stanton (1887–1976), American author on pre-school education
- Jim Stanton, American composer and political writer
- Jimmy Stanton (1860–1932), English footballer
- John Stanton (actor) (born 1944), Australian actor
- John Stanton (basketball) (1921–1989), American basketball player
- John Stanton (cricketer) (1901–1973), English cricketer
- John Stanton (journalist) (1956–2023), American journalist and author
- John Stanton (painter) (1857–1929), American painter and professor
- John A. Stanton (1857–1929), American painter and educator
- John W. Stanton (born 1955), American businessman
- J. William Stanton (1924–2002), American politician
- Johnny Stanton (born 1994), American football player
- Jonathan Stanton (1834–1918), American ornithologist and academic
- Joseph Stanton Jr. (1739–1821), American army officer and politician
- Joseph Stanton (born 1949), American art historian and poet

=== K ===
- Karen Stanton, British historian and academic
- Karen Clark Stanton (born 1955), American diplomat
- Kate Stanton (born 1998), Australian rules footballer
- Katie Jacobs Stanton (born 1970), American executive
- Kathy Stanton, Irish politician
- Kaylia Stanton (born 1994), Australian netball player
- Keith Stanton, British legal academic
- Krishna Stanton (born 1966), Australian distance runner

=== L ===
- Larry Stanton (1947–1984), American portrait artist
- Leroy Stanton (1946–2019), American baseball player
- Lewis E. Stanton (1833–1916), American attorney
- Lionel William Stanton (died 1897), Anglican minister in South Australia
- Lloyd Stanton, British film producer
- Louis L. Stanton (born 1927), American judge
- Lucy Stanton (abolitionist) (1831–1910), American abolitionist and feminist
- Lucy Celesta Stanton (1816–1878), American Mormon
- Lucy May Stanton (1875–1931), American painter

=== M ===
- Mac Stanton (born 1977), French electronic music producer
- Madeline Stanton (1898–1980), American librarian at Yale University
- Martin Stanton (born 1950), British psychoanalyst and writer
- Martin Walter Stanton (1897–1977), American Catholic bishop
- Mary Stanton (born 1947), American author
- Mary Irene Stanton (1862–1946), American educator
- Maura Stanton (born 1946), American poet and writer
- May Bonfils Stanton (1883–1962), American heiress and philanthropist
- Mike Stanton (left-handed pitcher) (born 1967), American baseball player
- Mike Stanton (right-handed pitcher) (born 1952), American baseball player
- Molly Stanton (born 1980), American actress

=== N ===
- Nadine Stanton (born 1975), New Zealand competitive shooter
- Nancy K. Stanton, American mathematician
- Nathan Stanton (born 1981), English footballer
- Neville Stanton (born 1975), Guyanese footballer
- Neville A. Stanton, British engineer and academic
- Nikki Stanton (born 1990), American soccer player
- Noel Stanton (1926–2009), British founder of the Jesus Army
- Nigel Stanton (born 1964), British diver

=== P ===
- Pat Stanton (born 1944), Scottish association football player and manager
- Patrick Stanton (1907–1976), American disc jockey and businessman
- Paul Stanton (actor) (1884–1955), American character actor
- Paul Stanton (ice hockey) (born 1967), American ice hockey player
- Paul Stanton (politician) (born 1985), American libertarian
- Paul T. Stanton (born c. 1973), United States Army general
- Peter Stanton (born 1940), Australian ecologist and botanist
- Phoebe Stanton (1914–2003), American architectural historian, urban planner, and professor
- Phoebe Stanton (teacher) (1844–1940), of South Australian private school
- Philip Stanton (born 1962), American artist and author based in Barcelona, Spain
- Phillip A. Stanton (1868–1945), American politician

=== R ===
- Ralph Gordon Stanton (1923–2010), Canadian mathematician and academic
- Reverend Father Stanton (1880–1937), Canadian football coach and missionary
- Richard Stanton (1876–1956), American silent film actor and director
- Richard Stanton of Rhiannon Davies and Richard Stanton, British activist
- Richard H. Stanton (1812–1891), Congressman from Kentucky
- Richard Limon Stanton (1926–2020), Australian geologist
- Richard Stanton-Jones (1926–1991), English aeronautical engineer
- Rick Stanton (born 1961), British civilian cave diver
- Robert Stanton (actor) (born 1963), American actor, director and playwright
- Robert Stanton (architect) (1900–1983), American architect
- Robert Stanton (Indiana politician) (1902–?), American dentist and Indiana state legislator
- Robert Stanton (merchant) (1793–1833), British politician
- Robert Stanton (park director) (born 1940), American administrator
- Robert Stanton (soccer) (born 1972), Australian soccer player and coach
- Robert Brewster Stanton (1846–1922), United States civil and mining engineer
- Robert L. Stanton (1810–1885), American Presbyterian minister and academic administrator
- Ron Stanton (1928–2012), Australian rugby league footballer
- Ronald Stanton (1928–2016), American businessman
- Rosemary Stanton (born 1944), Australian nutritionist and dietician
- Rosemary Brown Stanton (1924–2017), Bletchley Park employee in World War II
- Ryan Stanton (born 1989), Canadian ice hockey player

=== S ===
- Sam Stanton (born 1994), Scottish footballer
- Seabury Stanton (1892–1971), American businessman
- Shang Stanton (died 1889), American gambler
- Shonda Stanton, American softball coach
- Sid Stanton (1923–2005), English footballer
- Sophie Stanton (born 1971), English actress
- Stephen Stanton (born 1961), American voice actor
- Steve Stanton, Canadian author, editor and publisher
- Stiles Franklin Stanton (1846–1907), American broker
- Stuart Stanton, Australian rugby league player
- Stuart Stanton (surgeon) (1938–2024), British surgeon
- Susan Stanton (born 1959), American city administrator
- Susan Soon He Stanton, American playwright, television writer and screenwriter

=== T ===
- Thaddeus Harlan Stanton (1835–1900), Paymaster-General of the United States Army
- Theodore Stanton (1851–1925), American journalist
- Thomas Stanton (settler) (c.1616–1677), early settler in New England
- Thomas Stanton (Medal of Honor) (1869–1950), United States Navy sailor and recipient of the Medal of Honor
- Thomas Stanton (priest) (1806/7–1875), Anglican cleric
- Thomas Stanton (surgeon) (1875–1938), Canadian surgeon, entomologist and health administrator
- Sir Thomas Ernest Stanton (1865–1931), British engineer
- Tom Stanton (author) (born 1960), American nonfiction author
- Tom Stanton (baseball) (1874–1957), American baseball player
- Tom Stanton (cricketer) (born 1997), Irish cricketer
- Tom Stanton (footballer) (born 1948), Scottish footballer

=== V ===
- Val Stanton (1886-1967), English actor, athlete
- Vincent Henry Stanton (1846–1924), British theologian
- Vincent John Stanton (1817–1891), English missionary to Hong Kong

=== W ===
- Walter Stanton (1855-1943), English actor and performer
- Walter John Stanton (1828–1913), English civil engineer, industrialist and politician
- W. K. Stanton (Walter Kendall Stanton) (1891–1978), English organist, schoolmaster and composer
- William Stanton (disambiguation), several people, including those known as Bill or Will

=== Z ===
- Zed S. Stanton (1848–1921), American attorney and judge

== See also ==
- Stainton (surname)
