= John Stanton =

John Stanton may refer to:

- John Stanton (actor) (born 1944), Australian actor
- John Stanton (basketball) (1921–1989), American basketball player
- John Stanton (cricketer) (1901–1973), English cricketer
- John Stanton (journalist) (1956–2023), American journalist and writer
- John A. Stanton (1857–1929), American painter and professor
- John W. Stanton (born 1955), American businessman and baseball team owner
- J. William Stanton (1924–2002), American politician
