= Henry Stanton (disambiguation) =

Henry Brewster Stanton (1805–1887) was an American abolitionist and social activist.

Henry Stanton may also refer to:

- Henry Thompson Stanton (1834–1899), American poet
- Henry de Stanton, English medieval professor of canon law and university chancellor
- Henry Stanton (Oz), fictional character in the HBO drama Oz
- Henry Stanton (soldier) (c. 1796–1856), United States Army officer
