= Stuart Stanton (surgeon) =

Pioneering surgeon

- Born: Stuart Lawrence Richard Stanton; 24 October 1938; Dagenham
- Died: 21 May 2024 (aged 85); Jerusalem
- Education: City of London School; London Hospital Medical College
- Employers: Queen Charlotte's and Chelsea Hospital; Soho Hospital for Women; Royal Masonic Hospital; Institute of Urology; St George's Hospital

Stuart Lawrence Richard Stanton (1938–2024) was a British surgeon who pioneered urogynaecology in the UK. He was the professor of pelvic surgery and urogynaecology at St George's Hospital in London.

He researched and wrote extensively and trained many surgeons in techniques such as Burch colposuspension. As his students established the speciality in other countries, he was influential globally. He was especially supportive of Israel as he was Jewish and he spent most of his later life there. He was a fellow and founder member of the International Continence Society and other medical organisations.

== Early life and education ==
Stanton was born in Dagenham in Essex to a general practitioner (GP) and his wife, who lived over the surgery. He won a scholarship to the City of London School at age 10. The school had pioneered teaching of the sciences and Stanton excelled in these subjects.

He then studied medicine at the London Hospital Medical College for five years, starting in 1956. He had started to specialise in obstectrics there. He qualified as a doctor and developed his interest, working in several London hospitals. He became a Fellow of the Royal College of Surgeons (FRCS) in 1967 and Member of the Royal College of Obstetricians and Gynaecologists (MRCOG) in 1969.

== Urogynaecology ==
In 1971, he became a research registrar at the Institute of Urology under Richard Turner-Warwick. He was concerned that many women suffered from incontinence which was not well-treated. This required a combination of gynaecology and urology. In the US, they had been combined into the speciality of urogynaecology and so he visited specialists in the US such as Donald Ostergard and brought their techniques to the UK, especially colposuspension which became the best method of treating stress incontinence. His influence made the operation the most popular for that condition globally.

In 1972, he became senior registrar in obstectrics and gynaecology at St George's Hospital where he established a specialist service in urogynaecology, becoming a full time consultant in 1984. His research and reputation became prominent as he published 220 papers, served on the editorial boards of several journals and co-authored 13 textbooks. He held several visiting professorships and, in 1997, a professorial chair in pelvic surgery and urogynaecology was awarded by St George's. He pioneered training in the new techniques and taught 86 surgeons from 20 countries who went on to create similar departments and specialities elsewhere. Stanton was a founding member of the British Society of Urogynaecology (BSUG), the International Continence Society (ICS) and the International Urogynecological Association (IUA).

== Personal life ==
He married Ann Goldsmith in 1965. They had three daughters but divorced in 1991. He then married Julia Heller and they had two children.

He was an athlete as a student and won a championship race over the distance of half a mile. His later pastimes included ceramics, tennis and photography. But he was restless in retirement as he was driven by his work.

He was Jewish and active in the Jewish community from his youth when he attended synagogue regularly. In the UK, he supported organisations such as the Jewish Music Institute and South London Israel Forum. He became a visiting professor at the Hadassah Hospital in Jerusalem and visited it regularly for 20 years to treat patients and train Israeli doctors.

He moved to Jerusalem in retirement, doing charitable and cultural work there. In 2022, he was honoured by the Knesset for his services to urogynaecology in that country. He died in Jerusalem on 21 May 2024 with his family in attendance after a short illness.
