= General Stanton =

General Stanton may refer to:

- Edward Stanton (British Army officer) (1827–1907), British Army general
- Edwin Stanton (1814–1869), Union Army general-in-chief
- Henry Stanton (soldier) (c. 1796–1856), U.S. Army officer brevet brigadier general
- Joseph Stanton Jr. (1739–1821), Rhode Island Militia major general
- Thaddeus Harlan Stanton (1835–1900), U.S Army brigadier general
