= Thomas Stanton =

Thomas Stanton may refer to:

- Thomas Stanton (settler) (1616–1667), English settler, trader and negotiator in the Connecticut Colony
- Thomas Stanton (priest) (1806–1875), English archdeacon
- Thomas Ernest Stanton (1865–1931), English mechanical engineer
- Thomas Stanton (Medal of Honor) (1869–1950), United States Navy sailor and Medal of Honor recipient
- Thomas Stanton (surgeon), Canadian surgeon, entomologist and health administrator
- Thomas Stanton Lambert (1870–1921), British Army officer
- Tom Stanton (baseball) (1874–1957), American baseball player
- Tom Stanton (footballer) (born 1948), Scottish footballer and football manager
- Tom Stanton (author) (born 1960), American author
- Tom Stanton (cricketer) (born 1997), Irish cricketer
- Tom Stanton (Shortland Street), fictional character in 2011 show Shortland Street

== See also ==
- Thomas Staunton (disambiguation)
