= Thomas Staunton =

Thomas Staunton may refer to:

- Thomas Staunton (Nottinghamshire MP), MP for Nottinghamshire 1411
- Thomas Staunton (Ipswich MP), MP for Ipswich 1757–84

== See also ==
- Thomas Stanton (disambiguation)
- Staunton (surname)
