= Rajveer Purohit =

Indian-American urologist

- Born: September 9, 1971 (age 55); Jodhpur, India
- Education: Williams College, University of California, Columbia University College of Physicians and Surgeons, Columbia University Mailman School of Public Health
- Known for: Penile fracture treatment, Gender affirmation surgeries, Reconstructive urology
- Medical career
- Profession: Physician
- Institutions: Icahn School of Medicine at Mount Sinai, Mount Sinai Hospital New York Eye and Ear Infirmary
- Sub-specialties: Urologist
- Website: Mount Sinai Physician Page

Rajveer Purohit (born September 9, 1971) is an Indian-born American physician and urologist who is Director of Reconstructive Urology at The Mount Sinai Hospital in New York City and a professor in the Department of Urology at the Icahn School of Medicine at Mount Sinai.

Purohit is also director of Mount Sinai's one-year fellowship in reconstructive urology, which trains reconstructive procedures such as gender-affirming surgeries, vaginoplasty, metoidioplasty and phalloplasty. He co-developed the Purohit–Blaivas anterior urethral stricture staging system, a standardized method for classifying the severity of urethral strictures using cystoscopy.

He serves on the board of directors of the Society of Genitourinary Reconstructive Surgeons (GURS). With Miroslav Djordjevic he co-edited the Atlas of Operative Techniques in Gender Affirmation Surgery.

== Education and career ==
Purohit graduated from Williams College in 1993 with a B.A. in history, then earned an MD from Columbia University College of Physicians and Surgeons in 1998 and an MPH from Columbia University Mailman School of Public Health in 1999.

After medical school, he completed his surgical internship and urology residency at the University of California, San Francisco. He finished a fellowship in pelvic reconstruction and voiding dysfunction at Urocenter of New York under Jerry G. Blaivas, and then held a faculty appointment in the Department of Urology at Weill Cornell Medicine, and published research with Blavias in 2008 and 2015.

Purohit joined the Department of Urology at the Icahn School of Medicine at Mount Sinai in October 2017 as Director of Reconstructive Urology and was appointed professor of urology in June 2023. With Marci Bowers, co-authored a 2019 presentation on simplified penile inversion vaginoplasty.

== Research ==
Purohit's areas of research include reconstructive urology, voiding dysfunction, urethral strictures, gender affirmation surgery, mesh complications, reconstructive urology voiding dysfunction, minimally invasive urology, urogynecology, urologic oncology, treatment of complications of surgery and radiation therapy, and erectile dysfunction.

His research in urethral strictures revealed that low-stage urethral strictures rarely progresses and does not require surgery.

== Media recognition ==
Purohit is frequently invited by media to speak as an expert on penile fractures and urethroplasty. He is referenced in a book by Ross Asdourian, Broken Bananah, in which the author documented his experience with a traumatic penile fracture as well as his experience with the resulting reconstructive penile and urethral surgery performed by Purohit.

Television interviews include CNN and NBC’s Today Show.

He has been quoted in several international media outlets.

== Publications and editorial work ==
=== Books ===
- Blaivas, Jerry G., and Rajveer S. Purohit. Diagnosis and Treatment of Overactive Bladder. Oxford University Press, 2011. ISBN 978-0-19-975372-7.
- Purohit, Rajveer S., and Miroslav L. Djordjevic, editors. Atlas of Operative Techniques in Gender Affirmation Surgery. Academic Press/Elsevier, 2023. ISBN 978-0-323-98377-8.

=== Selected book chapters ===
- Purohit, Rajveer S., and Marshall L. Stoller. "Renal Colic Resulting From Renal Calculus Disease: Diagnosis and Management." In Urological Emergencies: A Practical Guide, edited by Hunter Wessells and Jack W. McAninch, pp. 241–262. Humana Press, 2005. ISBN 978-1-59259-886-1.
- Laudano, Melissa A., James M. Weinberger, Rajveer S. Purohit, and Jerry G. Blaivas. "Transvaginal Urethrolysis for Urethral Obstruction." In Female Pelvic Surgery, edited by Farzeen Firoozi, pp. 131–143. Springer, 2014. ISBN 978-1-4939-1503-3.
- Purohit, Rajveer S., and Jerry G. Blaivas. "Treatment of Overactive Bladder Refractory to Medications." In Minimally Invasive Therapy for Urinary Incontinence and Pelvic Organ Prolapse, pp. 123–132. Springer, 2014. ISBN 978-1-4939-0007-7.
- Purohit, Rajveer S., and Jerry G. Blaivas. "Female Urethral Reconstructive Surgery." In Complications of Female Incontinence and Pelvic Reconstructive Surgery, 2nd edition, edited by Howard B. Goldman, pp. 205–219. Springer, 2017. ISBN 978-3-319-49855-3.
- Kent, Marissa, and Rajveer S. Purohit. "Complications After Vaginoplasty." In Atlas of Operative Techniques in Gender Affirmation Surgery, pp. 167–181. Elsevier, 2023. ISBN 978-0-323-98377-8.
- De Rosa, Paige, and Rajveer S. Purohit. "Abdominal Phalloplasty." In Atlas of Operative Techniques in Gender Affirmation Surgery, pp. 305–325. Elsevier, 2023. ISBN 978-0-323-98377-8.
- Zisman, Ariel, Borko Stojanovic, Rajveer S. Purohit, and Miroslav L. Djordjevic. "Penile Prosthesis After Phalloplasty." In Atlas of Operative Techniques in Gender Affirmation Surgery, pp. 355–364. Elsevier, 2023. ISBN 978-0-323-98377-8.
- Sljivich, Michaela, Leyla Giordano, Marta R. Bizic, Miroslav L. Djordjevic, and Rajveer S. Purohit. "The Use of Bowel in Gender-Affirming Vaginoplasty." In Gender Affirming Vaginoplasty, pp. 165–185. Elsevier, 2025. ISBN 978-0-443-21776-0.
- Purohit, Rajveer S., Camille Torres, and Jerry G. Blaivas. "Female Urethral Reconstructive Surgery." In Complications of Urogynecology and Reconstructive Pelvic Surgery, edited by Howard B. Goldman and Jacqueline Zillioux, pp. 231–247. Springer, 2025. ISBN 978-3-032-00338-6.

=== Selected peer-reviewed articles ===
- Young J, Purohit RS. "Retained Vaginal Remnant and Urethrocutaneous Fistula in Transgender Man After Phalloplasty." Urology. 2020;136:e5–e6.
- Zisman A, Baiocco JA, Purohit RS. "Management of urethral strictures after masculinizing genital surgery in transgender men." Plastic and Aesthetic Research. 2022;9:15.
- Purohit RS, Kent M, Djordjevic ML. "Penile Prosthesis in Transgender Men after Phalloplasty." Indian Journal of Plastic Surgery. 2022;55(2):168–173.
- Valada A, Purohit RS, Djordjevic ML. "Musculocutaneous Latissimus Dorsi Phalloplasty: Technique and Tips." Urology. 2024;183:e323–e324.
- Ho P, Schmidt-Beuchat E, Sljivich M, Nyein E, Djordjevic ML, Tran A, Purohit RS. "Impact of vaginectomy technique on the outcomes of transmasculine gender affirming surgery." The Journal of Sexual Medicine. 2025;22(8):1483–1487.

=== Editorial work ===
Purohit and Djordjevic were guest editors of a collection in Plastic and Aesthetic Research titled "Urethroplasty: Current Techniques and Management of Complications".

== Professional associations ==
- Diplomate, American Board of Urology
- Member, Society of Genitourinary Reconstructive Surgeons (GURS)
- Member, American Urological Association
- Member, Society of Urodynamics and Female Urology (SUFU)
- Member, World Professional Association for Transgender Health (WPATH)
