= Vesicouterine fistula =

Abnormal communication between the bladder and uterus

- Other names: Youssef syndrome Menouria
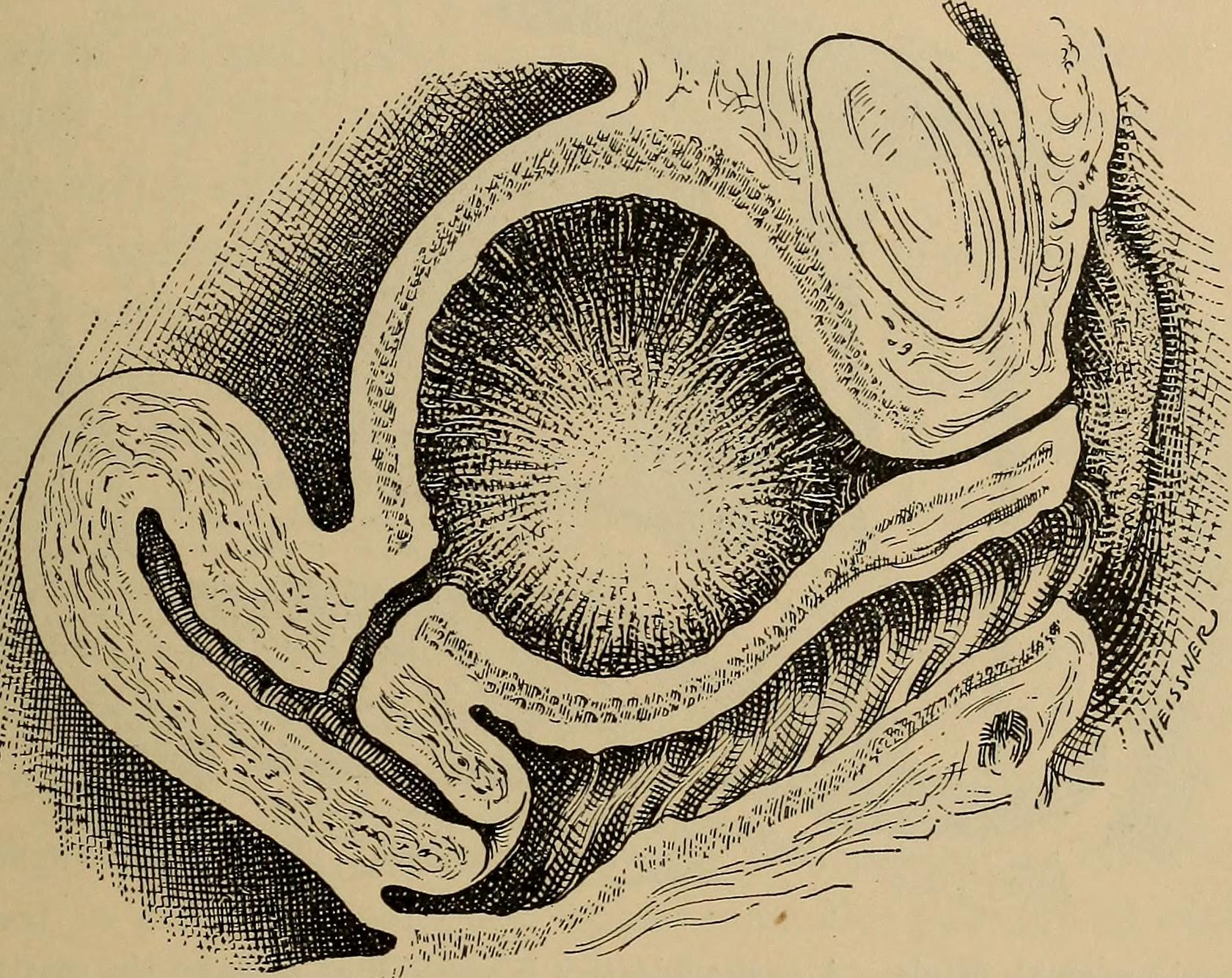
- Specialty: Urogynaecology
- Causes: Lower segment caesarean section
- Differential diagnosis: Endometriosis

Vesicouterine fistula refers to an abnormal communication between the bladder and uterus. The first case of vesicouterine fistula was reported in 1908. It was however first described in 1957 by Abdel Fattah Youssef, an obstetrician and gynaecologist in Kasr el-Aini hospital, Cairo, Egypt. It is characterized by a vesicouterine fistula above the level of the internal os, absence of menstrual bleeding, cyclical presence of blood in urine and absence of urinary incontinence with a patent cervical canal following a lower segment caesarean section. Six of such cases had been reported by other clinicians before the term Menouria was coined by Youssef.

== Pathology ==
Vesicouterine fistula is the least common type of urogenital fistula accounting for 1-4% of urogenital fistulas. It occurs following lower segment caesarean section and the incidence is increasing due to the increasing incidence of caesarean deliveries. The occurrence of menoruria in the absence of vaginal bleeding or passage of urine from the vagina is attributed to a sphincteric mechanism of the uterine isthmus.

Jozwik and Jozwik classified vesicouterine fistula into three types based on the route of menstrual flow;

I - Menstrual flow from the bladder only without urinary incontinence
II - Menstrual flow from both the bladder and vagina with urinary incontinence
III - Normal menstrual flow from the vagina only (no menouria) with urinary incontinence

Youssef syndrome corresponds to a type I vesicouterine fistula.

== Causes ==
Vesicouterine fistulas occur most commonly after lower segment caesarean sections (about 83-93% of cases). The possible mechanisms by which vesicouterine fistulas occur following caesarean sections include undetected bladder injury during caesarean section, inadvertent placement of a suture through the bladder during the repair of the uterus and abnormal blood vessel connections following multiple caesarean sections.

It may also present following use of obstetric forceps, manual placenta removal, external cephalic version, morbidly adherent placenta, surgical removal of fibroids, rupture of the uterus, perforation of the uterus and radiation therapy in the treatment of cervical cancer.

Vesicouterine fistula can also occur as a birth defect in conjunction with vaginal atresia.

== Diagnosis ==
The diagnosis of a vesicouterine fistula is made by demonstrating an abnormal connection between the cavities of the bladder and uterus. It can be diagnosed using hysterosalpingography, hysterography, cystography, magnetic resonance imaging (MRI) and computerised tomography. MRI has been found to have 100% accuracy in the diagnosis of vesicouterine fistula. It is also less invasive than other modalities and is considered the gold standard for diagnosis.

== Treatment ==
The options of treatment include watchful waiting for spontaneous resolution of the fistula, use of medications that can stop menstrual periods such as oral contraceptive pills, progesterone and gonadotropin releasing hormone analogs. Surgery can be carried out through the vagina, bladder or peritoneum and can be done via laparoscopic or robotic surgery.

Watchful waiting is the treatment of choice in case of small fistulas. The bladder is catheterised for a period of 4 to 8 weeks in order to allow spontaneous closure of the vesicouterine fistula. Fulguration of the fistula can also be done via cystoscopy in cases of small fistulas.

== Differential diagnosis ==
- Endometriosis

== See also ==
- Obstetric fistula
