= Dorothy Marshall (chemist) =

British chemist (b. 1868)

Dorothy Blanche Louisa Marshall
- Born: 12 December 1868; London
- Died: 1966 (aged 97–98)
- Citizenship: British
- Education: University College London, Bedford College
- Known for: Vaporisation of liquids
- Scientific career
- Fields: Chemistry, Physics, Electrical Technology
- Workplaces: Girton College, Cambridge Newnham College Avery Hill Training College Huddersfield Municipal High School Clapham High School National Physical Laboratory

Dorothy Blanche Louisa Marshall (12 December 1868 – 1966) was a British chemist who worked at Girton, Avery Hill and the National Physical Laboratory. In 1904, she signed a petition for women to be admitted as Fellows of the Chemical Society.

== Life ==
Dorothy Marshall was born on 12 December 1868 in London. She was one of the three daughters of Julian Marshall, connoisseur and collector, and Florence Ashton Thomas, musician and author . When Marshall was five years old, her father died at age 67. In 1922, her mother died.

== Education and Work ==
Marshall was educated at King Edward VI High School for Girls, Birmingham (KEVI) and went to Bedford College in 1886. Two years later, Marshall went on to study chemistry, physics and electrical technology at University College and graduated with a BSc (third class honours, chemistry) in 1891. As a postgraduate student at University College until 1894, Marshall studied heats of vaporisation of liquids . One of her three lengthy publications was co-authored with William Ramsay and the other one with Ernest Howard Griffiths, both appeared in 1896 and 1897. In 1896, Marshall was appointed as Demonstrator at Girton College, Cambridge and promoted to Resident Lecturer in Chemistry a year later. Marshall left Girton in 1906 to become a Senior Science Lecturer position at Avery Hill College. Appointed as Acting Principal in 1907, she resigned due to "illness" to refuse the position. In 1908, she became the Senior Science Mistress of Huddersfield Municipal High School. In 1913 she moved south to Clapham High School to take a position as Chemistry Mistress.

Like many other women in chemistry, Marshall started war work in 1916, in aeronautical engineering. This work was more in the realm of applied physics or engineering than pure chemistry, as it was looking at the heat flows of aero-engines. She co-authored two reports in 1916–17 with Thomas E. Stanton, one on the effect of surface roughness on the heat transmitted from hot bodies to fluids flowing over them, and the other on effect of surface roughness on the heat transmitted from hot surfaces to fluids flowing over them, with special reference to the case of the gills of an air-cooled engine. She was thereby one of the first women to be working on the properties of aero-engines, although a number of women were taken on at the end of the war, such as Frances B. Bradfield.

She worked with the National Physical Laboratory as scientific research assistant until the end of her career.

== Awards ==
As an excellent student, Marshall won several awards. She took three silver medals in analytical, organic, and general chemistry in 1888–1889. The following year, she won a prize in philosophy and logic. In 1889, she held a Tuffnell Scholarship.

== Works ==
In her papers on the heats of vaporisation of liquids, Marshall introduced a method of comparing directly the heats of evaporation of different liquids at their boiling points. The method used would conduct results that were not affected by errors in thermometer, changes in the specific heat of water, the capacity for heat of the calorimeter, and the loss or gain of heat by radiation. For setting up the apparatus, she wrote, "The liquid to be evaporated was contained in a small silver flask, connected with which was a spiral coil of silver tubing 18 feet in length. Both flask and spiral were within the calorimeter, and the water-vapour, after passing through the spiral, emerged from the apparatus at the temperature of the calorimeter. Surrounding the flask, and between it and the spiral, a coil of platinum-silver wire was arranged and flask, spiral, and coil were entirely immersed in a certain singularly limpid oil consisting of hydrocarbons only. "The calorimeter (which was filled to the roof with the oil, and the equality of temperature maintained by rapid stirring) was suspended by glass tubes within a steel chamber, whose walls were maintained at a constant temperature. So long, therefore, as the calorimeter and the surrounding walls were at equal temperatures, there was no loss or gain by radiation. If during an experiment the temperature of the surrounding walls changed, the method of experiment involved a corresponding change in the temperature of the calorimeter, and, therefore, some loss or gain of heat would be experienced. The apparatus was so designed that any such change in temperature was extremely small (in no case amounting to rhy°), yet, to estimate the loss or gain, it was necessary to know approximately the capacity for heat of the calorimeter and contents. Small differences between the temperature of the calorimeter and the surrounding walls would, during an experiment, be of no consequence provided that the oscillations were of such a nature that the mean temperature of the calorimeter was that of the surrounding space, and it will be found that this condition was fulfilled."

By using equation $L=[M/(m.e)].[(V.10^8)/J]$

where

L= heat in calories

M = mass of liquid vaporised

m = mass of copper deposited

e= electrochemical equivalent of copper

V = declustering potential in volts

J = mechanical equivalent of heat

Marshall calculated that the value of $L$ for benzene is 94.4 cal

=== Publications ===
Although her early work was largely on the applied physics of heat and its effects, she later also published, as lead author or co-author, on other aspects of flow, such as boundary layer effects and eddies, which had great relevance to the streamlining of aircraft, some of which were widely cited by others.

The Latent Heat of Evaporation of benzene. E. H. Griffiths M.A. F.R.S. & Miss Dorothy Marshall BSc The London, Edinburgh, and Dublin Philosophical Magazine and Journal of Science. Series 5. Volume 41, 1896 – Issue 248. Pages 1–37

II. A method of comparing directly the heats of evaporation of different liquids at their boiling-points. D Marshall, W Ramsay – The London, Edinburgh, and Dublin ..., 1896 – Taylor & Francis

On the heats of vaporisation of liquids at their boiling-points. Miss Dorothy Marshall BSc (UCL). The London, Edinburgh, and Dublin Philosophical Magazine and Journal of Science. Series 5. Volume 43, 1897 – Issue 260. Pages 27–32

On the conditions at the boundary of a fluid in turbulent motion. Thomas Edward Stanton, Dorothy Marshall, and Constance N. Bryant. Proceedings of the Royal Society of London. Series A, Containing Papers of a Mathematical and Physical Character. Published:3 August 1920

On the conditions at the boundary of a fluid in turbulent motion. Thomas Ernest Stanton; Dorothy Marshall; Constance N Bryant. London : His Majesty's Stationery Office, 1921. 19pp.

Eddy systems behind discs. T E Stanton; Dorothy Marshall. London : H.M.S.O., 1932. Series: Reports and memoranda (Great Britain. Aeronautical Research Committee), no. 1358. A

On the eddy system in the wake of flat circular plates in three dimensional flow. D Marshall, TE Stanton. Proceedings of the Royal Society of London. Series A, Containing Papers of a Mathematical and Physical Character 1931.

The growth of waves on water due to the action of the wind. Thomas Edward Stanton, Dorothy Marshall, R. Houghton, and Joseph Ernest Petavel. 137. Proceedings of the Royal Society of London. Series A, Containing Papers of a Mathematical and Physical Character. 2 August 1932. http://doi.org/10.1098/rspa.1932.0136
