= Janina Dill =

Political scientist

Academic background
- Education: University of Oxford
- Thesis: The definition of a legitimate target in US air warfare : a normative enquiry into the effectiveness of international law in the conduct of hostilities (2011)
- Doctoral advisor: Henry Shue

Janina Dill is the Dame Louise Richardson Chair in Global Security at the Blavatnik School of Government of the University of Oxford. She is known for her work in international humanitarian law.

== Education and career ==
Dill has a bachelors degree from Dresden and a masters degree from University of Cambridge. She earned her Ph.D. from University of Oxford. After her Ph.D. she was an assistant professor at the London School of Economics and then she was the John Gilbert Winant chair in American Foreign Policy at Nuffield College, Oxford. She was appointed at the Blavatnik School of Government in 2023.

As of 2025 she holds the Dame Louise Richardson Chair in Global Security at the Blavatnik School of Government, and she is the co-director of the Oxford Institute for Ethics, Law and Armed Conflict at the University of Oxford.

== Research ==
Dill is known for her work in international humanitarian law. She has spoken on a wide range of topics related to law and war, including the use of human shields by Hamas. She also studies how normative considerations can shape public opinion. Dill has written on how international law influences the choice of targets of attack in US air warfare, and the split between human rights and humanitarian law.

Dill doubted that the 2024 Lebanon electronic device attacks were proportionate, noting that people carry pagers to various places, including their homes. She questioned whether, given that hundreds of pagers exploded simultaneously, it was even possible for the attacker to meaningfully calculate the expected harm to civilians.

== Honors and awards ==
In 2021, she won a Philip Leverhulme Prize. In 2016 she was a runner up for the Birks Book Prize of The Society of Legal Scholars for her book Legitimate Targets? Social Construction, International Law and US Bombing (Cambridge University Press).

== Selected publications ==
- Dill, Janina (2014-10-31). Legitimate Targets?: Social Construction, International Law and US Bombing. Cambridge University Press. doi:10.1017/cbo9781107297463. ISBN 978-1-107-05675-6.
- Bohrer, Ziv; Dill, Janina; Duffy, Helen (2020-01-23). Law Applicable to Armed Conflict. Cambridge University Press. doi:10.1017/9781108674416. ISBN 978-1-108-67441-6.
- Dill, Janina (2023). "Threats to state survival as emergencies in international law". International Theory. 15 (2): 155–183. doi:10.1017/S1752971923000015. ISSN 1752-9719.
