= Jerry G. Blaivas =

American urologist

- Born: Brooklyn, New York
- Education: Tufts University School of Medicine, Boston City Hospital
- Years active: June, 1971 - present
- Spouse: Sue Blaivas
- Children: 3
- Medical career
- Profession: Urologist
- Institutions: Icahn School of Medicine at Mount Sinai, SUNY Downstate Medical Center Columbia University College of Physicians and Surgeons, Weill Medical College of Cornell University
- Research: BPH, urinary incontinence, and vaginal mesh complications
- Website: www.urocenterofnewyork.com

Jerry G. Blaivas is an American urologist and senior faculty at the Icahn School of Medicine at Mount Sinai in New York City and adjunct professor of Urology at SUNY Downstate Medical School in Brooklyn, as well as professor of clinical urology at College of Physicians and Surgeons, Columbia University and clinical professor of Urology at Weill Medical College of Cornell University. He has four patents pending, has received four research grants for which he served as the principal investigator, and served as a major in the United States Army assigned to the Walson Army Hospital. He additionally served as president for the Urodynamic Society (1992 – 1993).

== Biography ==
Blaivas received his MD at Tufts University School of Medicine in 1968; his internship and residency in general surgery were at Boston City Hospital from 1968 to 1971. His residency in urology was at Tufts Medical Center from 1973 to 1976, and his certification is with the American Board of Urology, where he has also served as an examiner in 1978. Blaivas is married and has three children.

== Research ==
Blaivas’ research has concentrated on BPH, urinary incontinence, and vaginal mesh complications. His pending patents focus on technological applications of data capture and medical information system. He was Principal Investigator on three grants focused on multiple sclerosis and has been funded by the National Multiple Sclerosis Society. Two of the projects studied voiding disturbances. He has been active in classification systems for incontinence, detrusor-external sphincter dyssynergia, overactive bladder, urinary urgency, nocturia, bladder outlet obstruction in women and urethral strictures. Many of his peer-reviewed articles are on urethral reconstruction in women, and he has performed over 140 urethral reconstructions.

== Professional activities ==
He was president of the Urodynamic Society (1992 – 1993), and founder and Editor-in-Chief of its journal Neurology and Urodynamics through 2007. In 1988, he founded (and is the medical director of) the Institute for Bladder and Prostate Research, a not-for-profit dedicated to research about treatment options for urological conditions, and is now their medical director. He is the Chief Scientific Officer for Symptelligence Medical Informatics. He is the chairman of three councils of the American Urological Association: the New Technology Council (1993 – 1997), the Biomedical Engineering Committee (1990 - 1993), and the Voiding Dysfunction Committee, (1996 - 2000)

== Honors and awards ==
Partial list:

- Ferdinand C. Valentine Award, New York Academy of Medicine, 2015
- “Four Fathers,” Society of Urodynamics, Female Pelvic Medicine & Urogenital Reconstruction, 2013
- Victor A. Politano Award, American Urological Association, 2009
- Establishment of the Annual Jerry G. Blaivas Honorary Lectureship, Society of Urodynamics and Female Urology, in 2007 in his honor.
- Continence Care Champion, National Association for Continence, 2005
- Lifetime Achievement Award, Society for Urodynamics and Female Urology, 1999
- Brantley Scott, M.D., Award, American Foundation for Urologic Disease, 1999
- J. Marion Sims Lecture, American Uro-Gynecologic Society, 1993

== Publications ==
=== Books edited ===
- NeuroUrology and Urodynamics: Principles and Practice, Edited by Yalla S, McGuire EM, Elbadawi A, Blaivas JG, New York, MacMillan Publishing Co., 1988 ISBN 0024308706
- Practical Neurourology: Genitourinary Complications in Neurourologic Disease, Edited by Blaivas JG, Chancellor MB. Butterworth-Heineman, Boston, 1995. ISBN 9780750695565
- Topics in Clinical Urology: Evaluation and Treatment of Urinary Incontinence, Edited by Blaivas JG. Igaku-Shoin. New York,1996. ISBN 9780896403062
- Blaivas JG, Chancellor MB, Verhaaren MR, Weiss JP (eds.). Atlas of Urodynamics (2nd Ed.), Wiley-Blackwell, 2007. ISBN 9781405146258
- Blaivas JG, Weiss JP. Benign Prostatic Hyperplasia and Lower Urinary Tract Symptoms, an Issue of Urologic Clinics (The Clinics: Internal Medicine). Saunders/Elsevier Health Sciences, 2009. ISBN 9781437712797
- Blaivas, JG, Purohit, RS, Diagnosis and Treatment of Overactive Bladder, Oxford University Press, New York, 2011 ISBN 9780199753727
- Weiss, JP, Blaivas, JG, van Kerrebroeck, PEV, Wein, AJ, Nocturia: Causes, Consequences and Clinical Approaches, Springer, New York, 2012 ISBN 9781461411550

=== Nonprofessional books ===
- Blaivas JG. Conquering Bladder and Prostate Problems: an Authoritative Guide for Men and Women, Plenum Publishing Corp. New York, 1998. ISBN 9780738204390

=== Articles ===
His most-cited peer-reviewed articles according to Google Scholar:

- Leach, GE; Dmochowski, RR; Appell, RA; Blaivas, JG; Hadley, HR; Luber, KM; Mostwin, JL; O'Donnell, PD; Roehrborn, CG (1997). "Female Stress Urinary Incontinence Clinical Guidelines Panel summary report on surgical management of female stress urinary incontinence. The American Urological Association". J Urol. 158: 875–80. doi:10.1097/00005392-199709000-00054. PMID 9258103. Cited by 895 articles as of 2019
- Abrams, P; Blaivas, JG; Stanton, SL; Andersen, JT (1988). "The standardisation of terminology of lower urinary tract function. The International Continence Society Committee on Standardisation of Terminology". Scand J Urol Nephrol Suppl. 114: 5–19. PMID 3201169. Cited by 598 related articles as of 2019
- Blaivas, JG; Olsson, CA (1988). "Stress incontinence: classification and surgical approach". J Urol. 139: 727–31. doi:10.1016/s0022-5347(17)42611-5. PMID 3352031. Cited by 537 articles as of 2019
- Blaivas, JG; Groutz, A (2000). "Bladder outlet obstruction nomogram for women with lower urinary tract symptomatology". Neurourol Urodyn. 19: 553–64. doi:10.1002/1520-6777(2000)19:5<553::aid-nau2>3.0.co;2-b. PMID 11002298. Cited by 408 articles as of 2019
- Blaivas, JG; Chaikin, DC (2011). "Pubovaginal fascial sling for the treatment of all types of stress urinary incontinence: surgical technique and long-term outcome". Urol Clin North Am. 38: 7–15, v. doi:10.1016/j.ucl.2010.12.002. PMID 21353074. Cited by 400 articles as of 2019
