= Ziv Bohrer =

Israeli jurist

- זיו בורר
- Born: Ziv Itzhak Bohrer; September 22, 1980
- Citizenship: Israel
- Occupations: Jurist, researcher, lecturer

Academic background
- Education: University of Haifa; Tel Aviv University

Academic work
- Discipline: Jurisprudence
- Sub-discipline: International law, international criminal law, international humanitarian law

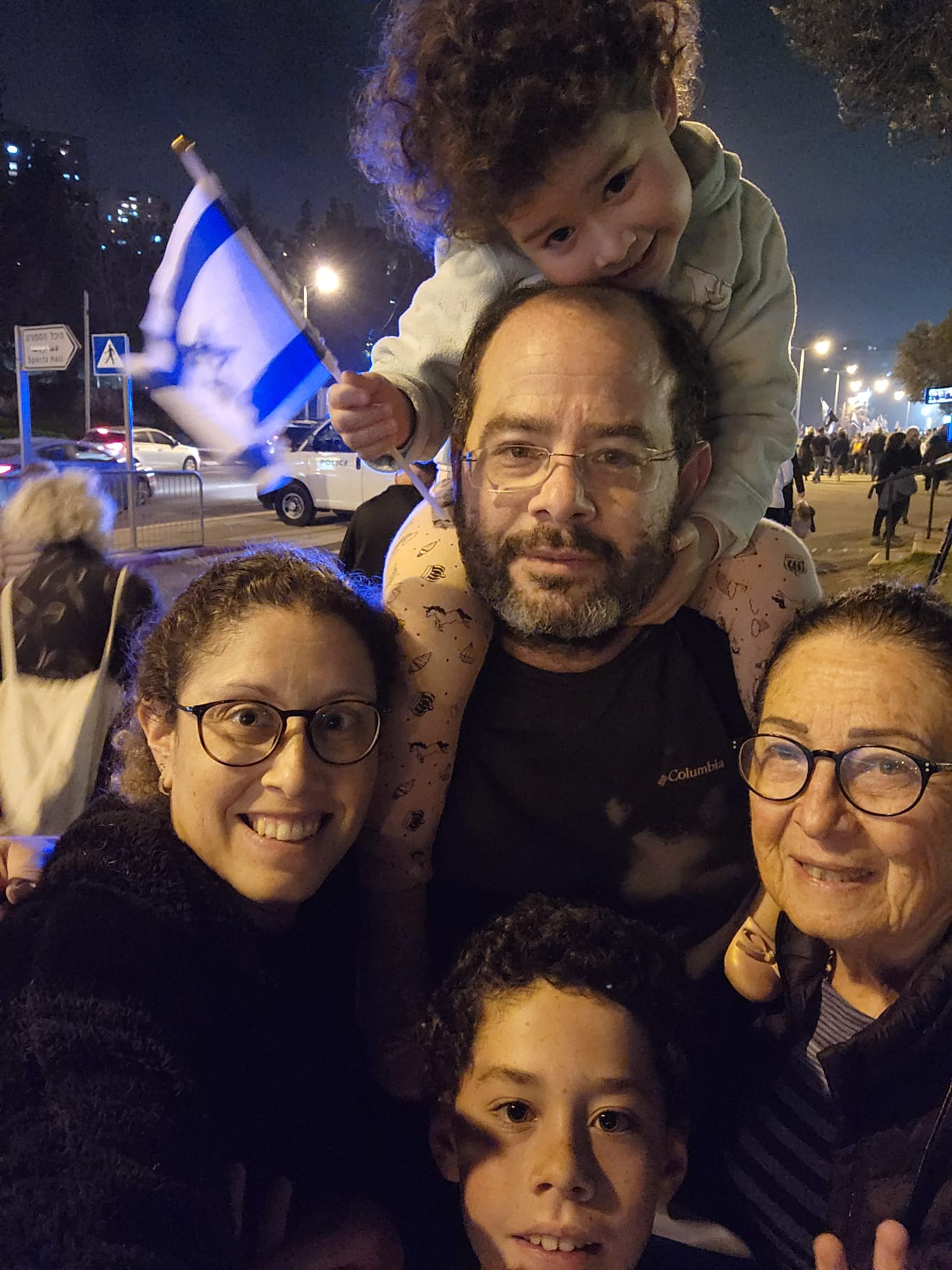
Ziv Bohrer in a 2023 pro-democracy demonstration, with his wife (Lena), his mother (Yocheved), and his children (Noa & Be'eri)

Ziv Itzhak Bohrer (Hebrew: זיו יצחק בורר; born 22 September 1980) is an Israeli jurist and researcher who specializes in public and criminal international law, as well as international humanitarian law. Bohrer is a senior lecturer at the Faculty of Law at Bar-Ilan University in Ramat Gan and a member of the Begin-Sadat Center for Strategic Studies.

== Education ==
Bohrer completed his bachelor's degree in law and psychology at the University of Haifa in 2002. In 2007, he completed his master's degree in law there, and in 2011 he received his doctorate in law from Tel Aviv University, where his doctoral thesis dealt with the superior orders defense, titled Superior orders defense: doctrinal and theoretical revision (Note: Hebrew: הגנת הצידוק עקב ציות לפקודה במשפט הפלילי המדינתי ובמשפט הבין-לאומי).

== Career ==
Between 2002 and 2006, he served in the Military Advocate General (MAG Corps'). In his last position in the unit, he served as the legal advisor to the Center for Employment of Civilian IDF Employees. In 2005, he received a certificate of excellence from the unit.

Since 2011, he has served as a visiting researcher at several research institutes and academic institutions, including the law faculties at the University of Michigan in the United States (2011–2012) and at University of Cambridge in the United Kingdom (2017), and at the Max Planck Institute for Comparative Public Law and International Law in Heidelberg, Germany (2019–2020).

Between 2012 and 2013, he served as a research fellow at the Sacher Institute at the Hebrew University of Jerusalem.

In 2015, he served as a visiting lecturer at the law faculty at the University of Georgia.

== Research ==
In 2020, he published two books on international criminal law: The justification defense based on obedience to orders and manifestly illegal orders: The existing and appropriate law in Israeli law (Note: Hebrew: הגנת הצידוק עקב ציות לפקודה ופקודות בלתי חוקיות בעליל: הדין המצוי והראוי במשפט הישראלי) published by the Israel Defense Forces' publication Maarachot, and Law applicable to armed conflict together with Helen Duffy and Janina Dill, published by Cambridge University Press. In the same year, he joined the academic advisory board of the Journal of the History of International Law, published by the Max Planck Institute. That same year, he was elected as a member of the Israel Academy of Sciences and Humanities' Young Scholars Forum in the Humanities and Social Sciences for the 2020–2021 academic year.

His articles have appeared in some of the most prominent journals in the field, including the Law and History Review and the European Journal of International Law.

In his research, Bohrer argues that the foundations of modern international criminal law are rooted in medieval chivalry and centuries-old customs. This position challenges the prevailing scholarly consensus, which views the field as a 20th century development, primarily emerging after World War II. Bohrer further contends that international law predates the national laws of various European states, contradicting the common view that international law evolved from domestic legal systems. Additionally, he co-authored an article with Danny Orbach analyzing the causes and prevention of war crimes as a product of competitive dynamics between both rivals and allies.

== Publications ==
- Bohrer, Ziv (2014). Lawyers in Warfare: Who Needs Them? (Report). Institute for National Security Studies. pp. 53–66. JSTOR resrep08957.7.
- Bohrer, Ziv (2016). "International Criminal Law's Millennium of Forgotten History". Law and History Review. 34 (2): 393–485. doi:10.1017/S073824801600002X. ISSN 0738-2480. JSTOR 24771456.
- Bohrer, Ziv (2018-12-20), "'Jolly Roger' (Pirate Flag)", International Law's Objects, Oxford University Press, pp. 259–271, doi:10.1093/oso/9780198798200.003.0022, ISBN 978-0-19-879820-0
- Bohrer, Ziv; Pirker, Benedikt (2022-12-05). "World War I: A Phoenix Moment in the History of International Criminal Tribunals". European Journal of International Law. 33 (3): 851–887. doi:10.1093/ejil/chac045. ISSN 0938-5428.
- Bohrer, Ziv (2023-08-02). "Nuremberg and Grotius's Scholarship as Non-Grotian Moments: On Novelty-Bolstering in International Law". Grotiana. 44 (1): 30–64. doi:10.1163/18760759-20230008. ISSN 0167-3831.
- Orbach, Danny; Bohrer, Ziv (November 2023). ""Let the Commander Respond": The Paradox of Obedience in the Imperial Japanese Armed Forces". Law and History Review. 41 (4): 817–839. doi:10.1017/S0738248023000391. ISSN 0738-2480.
- Orbach, Danny; Bohrer, Ziv (2025-08-04). "Atrocity and reciprocity during the Boxer War (1900–1901): Socio-legal perspectives". Modern Asian Studies: 1–52. doi:10.1017/S0026749X2500006X. ISSN 0026-749X.
