= Mac Stanton =

- Born: 1977 (age 48–49)
- Genre: French house
- Occupations: Label manager, producer
- Years active: 1995–present
- Label: So French Records
- Member of: Freshlovers

Mac Stanton (born 1977) is a French electronic music producer and the creator and manager of So French Records. Stanton is also part of the three-man (Stanton, Boss & Player) music group Freshlovers.

== Musical career ==
Stanton started producing at the age of 18. Stanton produces the "French Touch" style of house music.

In December 2008, Stanton created the So French Records record label. So French Records saw its first release in the Beverly Hills Chase EP by the Freshlovers. Beverly Hills Chase was remixed by a number of notable groups, including Superfunk, Super Mal, Jetset Hifi, Edwin Van Cleef, 4TrakZ, Vch Crew, Super 64, and Vox Populis.

Stanton has been featured on the music website In Your Speakers, describing him as an "up-and-coming Daft Punk protégé".

In February 2012, Stanton released his first album called A nos amours LP on So French Records, an album containing 17 tracks.

Stanton's album L'Odyssée was released in May 2017 on So French Records.

Stanton's new album L'Odyssée Live was released in June 2018 on So French Records.

Stanton released his third studio album Awesome in February 2020 on So French Records.

== Discography ==
Date	Release name	Artist(s)	Record label	Categorization
1 October 2009	Road 33 EP	Mac Stanton, Freshlovers	So French Records	SFR008
8 November 2010	A Nos Amours EP	Mac Stanton	So French Records	SFR023
22 November 2010	Friday Night EP	Mac Stanton, Freshlovers	So French Records	SFR024
11 April 2011	House Is Burnin' EP	Mac Stanton, Freshlovers	So French Records	SFR027
24 February 2012	A Nos Amours LP	Mac Stanton	So French Records	SFR035
24 February 2017	All Right EP	Mac Stanton	So French Records	Free Ep
26 May 2017	L'Odyssée LP	Mac Stanton	So French Records	Album
25 June 2018	L'Odyssée Live LP	Mac Stanton	So French Records	Album
28 February 2020	Awesome LP	Mac Stanton	So French Records	Album
24 February 2024	Holidays 909 LP	Mac Stanton	So French Records	Album
