= Staunton (surname) =

Staunton is a surname. Notable people with the surname include:

- George Leonard Staunton, English botanist
- Sir George Thomas Staunton, English traveller and orientalist
- Henry Staunton (businessman), British businessman
- Henry de Staunton, English medieval professor of canon law and university chancellor
- Howard Staunton, English chess master who lends his name to a style of chess pieces
- Imelda Staunton, English actress and singer
- Irene Staunton, Zimbabwean publisher and editor
- Madonna Staunton (1938–2019), Australian artist and poet
- Myles Staunton (1935–2011), Irish Fine Gael politician and businessman
- Steve Staunton, former Irish footballer and former manager of Ireland national team
- Thomas Staunton (Nottinghamshire MP), MP for Nottinghamshire 1411
- Thomas Staunton (Ipswich MP), MP for Ipswich 1757–84

== See also ==
- Stanton (surname)
