= British Society of Urogynaecology =

British Society of Urogynaecologists
- Abbreviation: BSUG
- Formation: 2001
- Founder: Linda Cardozo in collaboration with the RCOG and the Research Urogynaecology Society (RUGS) team
- Type: Charity
- Legal status: Society
- Purpose: Helping members deliver optimal care for women who want urogynaecological help: Guidelines, audit, training and research
- Headquarters: RCOG London, 10-18, Union St, London SE1 1SZ
- Members: Paid
- Official language: English
- Founding Chair: Professor Linda Cardozo
- Current Chair: Mr Ashish Pradhan
- Honorary President 2001 to 2019: Professor Stuart L Stanton
- Parent organization: RCOG
- Affiliations: IUGA, EUGA
- Staff: 2
- Website: www.bsug.org.uk

The British Society of Urogynaecology (BSUG) is a professional society in the United Kingdom for urogynaecologists.

BSUG assists its members help women suffering with urogynaecological concerns by promoting and raising standards in urogynaecology. The BSUG provides guidelines, training, research and clinical meetings, in conjunction with the Royal College of Obstetricians and Gynaecologists (RCOG).

== History ==
BSUG was formed in 2001 following a request from the President of the RCOG, Bob Shaw. He wanted to establish specialist societies who could advise the RCOG on their subspecialties. While he was keen to affiliate them to the college, this was initially rejected by the council. Nonetheless, the College Officers realised the importance of a close working relationship with specialist societies and a College Officers/Specialist Societies Liaison Group was formed. At the time of the request, apart from the Research Urogynaecology Society (RUGS), no British urogynaecological society existed. Linda Cardozo therefore proposed that one should be formed and approached then Mr Bob Freeman and Mr Vik Khullar, (now both Professors) Chairman and Secretary of RUGS at the time. They started working on a constitution and setting up a general committee/executive and subcommittees.

== Subcommittees ==
=== Audit Database subcommittee ===
This subcommittee provides all members a means of collecting data for all prolapse and incontinence surgery. This national database is useful for all clinicians and patients to compare and inform outcomes.

=== Governance subcommittee, ===
This subcommittee helps colleagues achieve the BSUG Accreditation and also provides Medico-legal opinion, if members have been trained in expert report writing. Thirty one units are now BSUG accredited.

=== Information Technology subcommittee ===
This subcommittee, has responsibility for the BSUG website, Patient Information, aides for clinicians and information pertaining to Consent Aside from studying the latest evidence to ensure we report best practice and data, the subcommittee, ensures patient information is directed at the patient by undertaking an assessment styled on the 'Plain English Campaign' followed by a public consultation on draft documents prior to publishing the final version.

=== Training subcommittee ===
This subcommittee strives to improve standards of training and assessment in urogynaecology. Liaising with the relevant RCOG committees on matters pertaining to urogynaecology advanced training modules and subspecialty training in urogynaecology has been developed. The team has also set up a multi-disciplinary urodynamic training accreditation with urologists, physiotherapists, continence advisers, medical physicists and others.

=== Research subcommittee ===
This committee promotes urogynaecology research in the UK. There has been collaboration with the UK Comprehensive Research Network (UKCRN) national trials portfolio and pelvic floor clinical studies group, towards developing new protocols.

=== Meetings subcommittee ===
This subcommittee organises meetings and training opportunities. There is the annual meeting, held jointly with the RCOG, in addition to other meetings, including meetings on sexual dysfunction, a surgical masterclass and obstetric pelvic floor injury.

=== Associate Members subcommittee ===
This subcommittee represents the junior doctors with an interest in Urogynaecology and amongst other things organises meetings for junior doctors who have an interest in urogynaecology.

== Road shows ==
BSUG runs meetings with urogynecologists on a regular basis in different locations around the United Kingdom,

In these meetings BSUG representatives explain the BSUG's role in setting and raising standards, through guidelines, promoting the RCOG's clinical standards, meetings, auditing outcomes through our database and, as an affiliate society to the IUGA, receiving the International Urogynecology Journal (IUJ) electronically.

== IUGA and EUGA ==
In 2004 BSUG formally affiliated to the International Urogynecological Association IUGA. Many BSUG members now attend the annual IUGA meeting, several are chairs of committees and the current and previous IUGA Presidents are BSUG members.

BSUG also has a relationship with EUGA (European Urogynaecological Association) .

== Executive positions ==
Chair	Dates	Vice Chair	Dates	Secretary	Dates	Treasurer	Dates
Linda Cardozo	2001-2006	Paul Hilton	2001-2006	Bob Freeman	2001-2006	Vik Khullar	2001-2006
Bob Freeman	2006-2009	Tony Smith	2006-2009	Ash Monga	2006-2009	Abdul Sultan	2006-2009
Tony Smith	2009-2012	Vik Khullar	2009-2012	Ranee Thakar	2009-2012	Simon Hill	2009-2014
Ash Monga	2012-2015	Alfred Cutner	2012-2015	Tim Hillard	2012-2015	Philip Toozs-Hobson	2014-2017
Alfred Cutner	2015-2017	Jonathan Duckett	2015-2017	Jason Cooper	2015-2018	Philip Toozs-Hobson	2014-2017
Jonathan Duckett	2017-2019	Swati Jha	2017-2019	Ashish Pradhan	2018-2021	Christian Philips	2017-2021
Swati Jha	2019-2021	Karen Ward	2019-2021	Ashish Pradhan	2018-2021	Karen Guerrero	2021-2024
Karen Ward	2021-2023	Ashish Pradhan	2021-2023	Azar Khunda	2021-2023	Karen Guerrero	2021-2024
Ashish Pradhan	2023-2025	Azar Khunda	2023-2025	Kapil Kaur	2023-2026	Karen Guerrero	2021-2024
