= William Stanton =

William Stanton may refer to:

== Art and achitecture ==
- William A. Stanton (architect), (1870–1948), American architect
- William Stanton (mason) (1639–1705), English mason and sculptor

== Entertainment ==
- William Graham Stanton (1917–1999), British radio playwright
- Will Stanton (actor) (1885–1969), American actor
- Will Stanton (author) (1918–1996), author of humorous fiction and articles
- Will Stanton, fictional character from The Dark Is Rising series
- William Stanton, fictional character from By Force of Arms

== Politics ==
- William A. Stanton (diplomat) (born 1947), American diplomat
- William F. Stanton (1923–2024), American politician, served in California legislature
- William Henry Stanton (MP) (1790–1870), British politician, Member of Parliament for Stroud
- William Henry Stanton (congressman) (1843–1900), American politician, Congressman from Pennsylvania
- J. William Stanton (1924–2002), American politician, Congressman from Ohio

== Other ==
- William A. Stanton, better known as Buck Stanton (1870–1909), American entomologist at Manila Observatory
- Mike Stanton (William Michael Stanton, born 1967), American baseball player
- Bill Stanton (footballer) (1890–1977), English footballer
- Bill Stanton (gridiron football) (1924–2010), Canadian football player, Ottawa Rough Riders
