= Legal Studies (law journal) =

Academic journal

- Discipline: law
- Language: English

Publication details
- History: 1981–present
- Publisher: Cambridge University Press (previously published by John Wiley & Sons)
- Frequency: Quarterly

Standard abbreviations
- ISO 4: Leg. Stud.

Indexing
- ISSN: 1748-121X

Links
- Journal homepage

Legal Studies (ISSN 1748-121X) is a peer-reviewed academic journal published on behalf of The Society of Legal Scholars (SLS). It was first published in 1981 by Wiley Press and, since 2018, has been published by Cambridge University Press.

Legal Studies is now recognised as "one of the leading generalist journals in the UK". It publishes peer-reviewed scholarly articles, notes, reports, and book reviews. A ranking of UK law journals based on statistical data from the 2001 Research Assessment Exercise uses Legal Studies as the 'benchmark'.

The winner of the Society of Legal Scholars' best paper award is published in the journal. In 2023, this award was given to Conall Mallory and Hélène Tyrrell for their article The Extrajudicial Voice, a study of the views of 13 very senior judges as to their role and conduct.
