= Louise Crow =

American painter (1891–1968)

- Born: September 14, 1891; Seattle, Washington, U.S.
- Died: July 26, 1968 (aged 76); San Mateo, California, U.S.
- Other names: Louise Crow Keech, Louise Boyac, Louise Crow Boyac
- Education: San Francisco Institute of Art; Cincinnati Art Academy; National Academy of Design
- Occupation: Painter
- Known for: Genre painting, portraiture
- Spouse: Roy Adalbert Keech (m. 1939–?)

Louise Crow (September 14, 1891 – July 26, 1968) was an American painter. She is best known for her portraits of Puebloans. She worked in oils and watercolors, and with a wide variety of subjects including landscapes, Northwest scenes of rugged mountains, seascapes, and portraits of such historical figures as Ezra Meeker, a pioneer who traveled the Oregon Trail. Her technique was crisp and clean, and is contemporary despite her working nearly one hundred years ago. Much of her work, which has been a challenge to locate, concentrated on California and Southwest themes. Institutions that own her include the New Mexico Museum of Art, the Museum and History and Industry and the Washington State Governor's Mansion.

== Biography ==
Louise Crow was born on September 14, 1891, in Seattle, Washington. She was raised in a prominent Seattle family, with members active as business leaders, politicians, and musicians.

From a young age Crow was determined to be an artist. In 1914 she attended William Merritt Chase's summer school in Carmel, California; and later studied at the San Francisco Institute of Art (1914 to 1917), under John A. Stanton and Frank Van Sloun. She began exhibiting in California and Seattle in 1915, then studied at the Art Students League under Max Weber, and at the National Academy of Design in New York in 1918. She pursued additional studies with the highly regarded Frank Duveneck at the Art Academy of Cincinnati, and like may other young artists, spent a few months painting in Paris.

Crow lived in Santa Fe, New Mexico from 1918 to 1921. During this time Crow concentrated on illustrating the Pueblo people and their surrounding landscape. In her first exhibition at the Museum of Art she showed fourteen paintings, and the review in El Palacio was very positive. Edgar Lee Hewett, who was an American anthropologist and archaeologist noticed the fine quality of her work and made her a fellow at the School of American Research in 1920. Crow had a preference for portraiture, her greatest interest being the multi-faceted nature of people. In gratitude of Hewett's support, she painted a portrait of him in 1918 and presented it as a gift to the Museum of New Mexico. Another one of her works in the museum is a portrait Yen-see-do. Painted before 1919, it is a striking image that merges realism with a flat modernist perspective, contrasting darker hues of red and black with pale purple and yellow. This portrait is among the more iconic works in the museums holdings.

Because of her work with Hewett the San Ildefonso Pueblo became the inspiration for her work. In 1921 Crow brought to Paris several of her paintings of Southwest subject matter, including her very large canvas, Eagle Dance, San Ildefonso, of 1919. The painting was selected for inclusion at the 1921 Salon d’ Automne and was favorably received. The next year she organized an exhibit in Rome. After returning to the United States she divided her rime between Seattle, where she opened a studio, San Francisco, and Santa Fe. When she returned to Santa Fe in 1938, Ina Sizer Cassidy wrote in an article: "It is not to expect too much to feel that the work of Louise Crow in the coming years will add much to the prestige of New Mexico, and Santa Fe in Particular, as an art center of the west."

Ultimately though, by 1938 Crow's circumstances had changed. Her family's fortune had been lost during The Great Depression. She married poet and WWI veteran, Roy A. Keech in 1939 in Santa Fe, New Mexico. Although she had experienced significant success early in life, her painting career was stifled by mental illness in later years. As her mental health deteriorated, she felt compelled to destroy many of the paintings that were once so highly acclaimed. Fewer that twenty of her works are known to exist today.

Towards the latter half of her life she used the last name Boyac. Crow died destitute on July 26, 1968, in San Mateo, California.

== Notable works ==
- Yen-See-Do, 1915, oil on canvas.
- Eagle Dance, San Ildenfonso, 1919, oil on canvas, 6 X 8 feet.
- The Artist's Mother, c. 1920 – c. 1925, oil on canvas
