= The Society of Legal Scholars =

Learned society

The Society of Legal Scholars (SLS) is the learned society for those who teach law in a university or similar institution or who are otherwise engaged in legal scholarship. As of the beginning of 2016 the Society had over 3,000 members consisting of academic and practising lawyers in a wide variety of subject areas. It has charitable status.

The SLS publishes one of the UK's leading generalist peer-reviewed law journals, Legal Studies.

The Society was founded in 1908 by Edward Jenks as The Society of Public Teachers of Law and changed its name to the SLS in 2002.

== List of presidents ==
President of The Society of Public Teachers of Law

- 1997–1999: Margaret Brazier
- 2000–2001: Joe Thomson

President of The Society of Legal Scholars

- 2008–2009: Sarah Worthington
- 2010-2011: David Feldman
- 2011–2012: Keith Stanton
- 2015–2016: Andrew Burrows
- 2015–2017: Imelda Maher
- 2024–2025: Duncan Sheehan
- 2025–2026: Claudina Richards
- 2026–2027: Joan Loughrey

== Prizes and awards ==
The society awards the Peter Birks and Margaret Brazier Prizes for Outstanding Legal Scholarship, annually. The Peter Birks award is given to scholars who have been in full-time academic employment for not more than 6 years and were not a professor on the date of publication of the book. The Brazier prize is awarded to scholars who have been in full-time academic employment for more than 6 years but not more than 15 years, and were not a professor on the date of publication of the book.

=== 2025 ===
Shortlisted:

1. Dr Haim Abraham, Tort Liability in Warfare: States’ Wrongs and Civilians’ Rights, Oxford University Press, 2024
2. Rachael Blakey, Rethinking Family Mediation: The Role of the Family Mediator in Contemporary Times, Bristol University Press, 2025
3. Professor Jordan English, Discharge of Contractual Obligations, Oxford University Press, 2025
4. Dr Victoria Hooton, Free Movement and Welfare Access in the European Union: Re-Balancing Conflicting Interests in Citizenship Jurisprudence, Hart Publishing, 2024
5. Dr Elizabeth Chloe Romanis, Biotechnology, Gestation and the Law, Oxford University Press, 2025

=== 2024 ===
Shortlisted:

1. Deval Desai, Expert Ignorance: The Law and Politics of Rule of Law Reform, Cambridge University Press, 2023.
2. Gabrielle Golding, Shaping Contracts for Work: The Normative Influence of Terms Implied by Law, Oxford University Press, 2023.
3. Timothy Liau, Standing in Private Law: Powers of Enforcement in the Law of Obligations and Trusts, Oxford University Press, 2023.
4. Vilija Vėlyvytė, Judicial Authority in EU Internal Market Law: Implications for the Balance of Competences and Powers, Hart Publishing, 2022.

The winner of the Peter Birks Prizes for Outstanding Early Career Legal Scholarship is Timothy Liau, Standing in Private Law: Powers of Enforcement in the Law of Obligations and Trusts, Oxford University Press, 2023.

Second prize was awarded to Vilija Vėlyvytė, Judicial Authority in EU Internal Market Law: Implications for the Balance of Competences and Powers, Hart Publishing, 2022.

=== 2023 ===
Shortlisted:

Dr Alysia Blackham, Reforming Age Discrimination Law: Beyond Individual Enforcement (OUP)

Dr Philippa Collins, Putting Human Rights to Work: Labour Law, The ECHR and the Employment Relation (OUP)

Dr Jodi Gardner, The Future of High-Cost Credit: Rethinking Payday Lending (Hart)

Dr Joshua Jowitt, Agency, Morality and Law (Hart)

Dr Jaime Lindsey, Reimagining the Court of Protection: Access to Justice in Mental Capacity Law (CUP)

Dr Sharon Thompson, Quiet Revolutionaries: The Married Women’s Association and Family Law (Hart)

The winner of the Peter Birks Prizes for Outstanding Legal Scholarship is Dr Alysia Blackham (Melbourne) for Reforming Age Discrimination Law: Beyond Individual Enforcement (OUP).

Second prize was awarded to Dr Sharon Thompson (Cardiff) for Quiet Revolutionaries: The Married Women’s Association and Family Law (Hart).

=== 2022 ===
Shortlisted:

Dr Beverley Clough, The Spaces of Mental Capacity Law: Moving beyond Binaries (Routledge)

Dr Dominic de Cogan, Tax Law, State-Building and the Constitution (Hart Publishing)

Dr Richard Martin, Policing Human Rights: Law, Narratives and Practice (OUP)

Dr Natasa Mavronicola, Torture, Inhumanity and Degradation under Article 3 of the ECHR: Absolute Rights and Absolute Wrongs (Hart Publishing)

Professor Natasa Mavronicola (Birmingham) is the winner of the Peter Birks Book Prize for Outstanding Legal Scholarship 2022 for Torture, Inhumanity and Degradation under Article 3 ECHR (Hart Publishing).

The runner up was Dr Dominic de Cogan (Cambridge) for Tax Law, State-Building and the Constitution (Hart Publishing).

=== 2021 ===
Shortlisted:

The Anatomy of Administrative Law, Dr Joanna Bell (Hart Publishing)

Reconceptualising Corporate Compliance: Responsibility, Freedom and the Law, Dr Anna Donovan (Hart Publishing)

Human Rights Imperialists: The Extraterritorial Application of the European Convention on Human Rights, Dr Conall Mallory (Hart Publishing)

Capitalism before Corporations: The Morality of Business Associations and the Roots of Commercial Equity and Law, Dr Andreas Televantos (Oxford University Press)

Respect and Criminal Justice, Dr Gabrielle Watson (Oxford University Press)

Dr Andreas Televantos is the winner of the Peter Birks Book Prize for Outstanding Legal Scholarship 2021 for Capitalism before Corporations: The Morality of Business Associations and the Roots of Commercial Equity and Law (Oxford University Press).

There were two joint runners up: Dr Joanna Bell for The Anatomy of Administrative Law (Hart Publishing) and Dr Anna Donovan for Reconceptualising Corporate Compliance: Responsibility, Freedom and the Law (Hart Publishing).

=== 2020 ===
Shortlisted:

Intersectional Discrimination, Dr Shreya Atrey (Oxford University Press)

Child Perpetrators on Trial, Dr Jastine Barrett (Cambridge University Press)

Values in the Supreme Court: Decisions, Division and Diversity, Dr Rachel Cahill O’Callaghan (Hart Publishing)

Art and Modern Copyright: The Contested Image, Dr Elena Cooper (Cambridge University Press)

The EU as a Global Regulator for Environmental Protection: A Legitimacy Perspective, Dr Ioanna Hadjiyianni (Hart Publishing)

Legal Validity: The Fabric of Justice, Dr Maris Kopcke (Hart Publishing)

A Case for Shareholders’ Fiduciary Duties in Common Law Asia, Ernest Lim (Cambridge University Press)

The Construction of Guilt in China: An Empirical Account of Routine Chinese Injustice, Dr Yu Mou (Hart Publishing)

Dr Yu Mou is the winner of the Peter Birks Prize for Outstanding Legal Scholarship 2020 for The Construction of Guilt in China: An Empirical Account of Routine Chinese Injustice (Hart Publishing).

There were two joint runners up: Dr Shreya Atrey for Intersectional Discrimination (Oxford University Press) and Dr Ernest Lim for A Case for Shareholders’ Fiduciary Duties in Common Law Asia (Cambridge University Press).

=== 2019 ===
Dr Oisin Suttle (Belfast) is the winner of the Peter Birks Book Prize for Outstanding Legal Scholarship (2019) for Distributive Justice and World Trade Law – A Political Theory of International Trade Regulation (Cambridge University Press).

There were two joint runners up: Dr Noam Gur (QMUL) – Legal Directives and Practical Reasons (Oxford University Press) and Dr Hélène Tyrrell (Newcastle) – Human Rights in the UK and the Influence of Foreign Jurisprudence (Hart Publishing).

=== 2018 ===
Dr Nimer Sultany (SOAS) is the winner of the Peter Birks Book Prize for Outstanding Legal Scholarship (2018) for Law and Revolution: Legitimacy and Constitutionalism After the Arab Spring. (OUP).

Runner-up: Dr Lydia Hayes (Cardiff) for Stories of Care: A Labour of Law. Gender and Class at Work. (Palgrave)

=== 2017 ===
Devyani Prabhat (Bristol) is the winner of the Peter Birks Book Prize for Outstanding Legal Scholarship (2017) for Unleashing the Force of Law; Legal Mobilization, National Security, and Basic Freedoms. (Palgrave MacMillan).

Runner-up: Alysia Blackham (Melbourne) for Extending Working Life for Older Workers: Age Discrimination Law, Policy and Practice. (Hart Publishing)

=== 2016 ===
Jason Varuhas, (Melbourne) is the winner of the Peter Birks Book Prize for Outstanding Legal Scholarship (2016) for Damages and Human Rights (Hart Publishing).

There were two joint runners up: Janina Dill, for Legitimate Targets? Social Construction, International Law and US Bombing (Cambridge University Press) and Sandy Steel, for Proof of Causation in Tort Law (Cambridge University Press).

=== 2015 ===
Katja LH Samuel, University of Reading – Judging The OIC, the UN, and Counter-Terrorism Law-Making: Conflicting or Cooperative Legal Orders? (Studies in International Law, Hart Publishing),

Runners-up: Paul S Davies,University of Oxford, Accessory Liability (Hart Studies in Private Law: Hart Publishing).

=== 2014 ===
Dr Jeff King, of UCL, Judging Social Rights (Cambridge Studies in Constitutional Law, CUP).

Runners-up: Dr James Goudkamp (Oxford University) Tort Law Defences (Hart Studies in Private Law, Hart Publishing);

and to Dr Jure Vidmar, (Oxford University) with his book Democratic Statehood in International Law: The Emergence of New States in Post-Cold War Practice (Studies in International Law, Hart Publishing).

=== 2013 ===
Erika Rackley, “Women, Judging and the Judiciary: From Difference to Diversity”, ( Routledge Cavendish).

=== 2025 ===
Shortlisted:

1. Dr Jennifer Aston, Deserted wives and economic divorce in 19th Century England and Wales, Hart Publishing, 2024
2. Dr Thomas Muinzer, Major Cases in Climate Law: A Critical Introduction, Hart Publishing, 2025
3. Ailbhe O’Loughlin, Law and Personality Disorder: Human Rights, Human Risks, and Rehabilitation, Oxford University Press, 2024

=== 2024 ===
Shortlisted:

1. Foluke Adebisi, Decolonisation and Legal Knowledge: Reflections on Power and Possibility, Bristol University Press, 2023
2. Joshua Paine, The Functions of International Adjudication and International Environmental Litigation, Cambridge University Press, 2024
3. Brian Tobin, The Legal Recognition of Same-Sex Relationships: Emerging Families in Ireland and Beyond, Hart Publishing, 2023

The winner of the Margaret Brazier Prizes for Outstanding Mid-Career Legal Scholarship is Foluke Adebisi, Decolonisation and Legal Knowledge: Reflections on Power and Possibility, Bristol University Press, 2023.

Second prize was awarded to Joshua Paine, The Functions of International Adjudication and International Environmental Litigation, Cambridge University Press, 2024
