= Trammo =

American chemical company

Trammo, Inc., (formerly known as Transammonia, Inc.)
- logo_alt=Trammo Company Logo
- Company type: Privately held company
- Founded: 1965
- Founder: Ronald P. Stanton
- Headquarters: New York City, NY, and Palm Beach Gardens, FL, United States
- Key people: Edward G. Weiner, CEO and President (as of 2025)
- Products: Anhydrous ammonia, Finished fertilizer, Nitric acid, Petroleum coke, Sulfur, Sulfuric acid
- Services: Trading, import and export, logistics, distribution, marketing, and merchandising
- Number of employees: 150
- Website: www.trammo.com

Trammo, Inc., (formerly known as Transammonia, Inc., also known as Trammo Group), engages in the international commerce, trade, transportation, distribution, and marketing of the raw materials critical to the fertilizer, mining, and petrochemical industries. Its products include anhydrous ammonia, sulfur, sulfuric acid, finished fertilizers, petroleum coke, and nitric acid. The company was established by Ronald Stanton in 1965, and is currently headquartered in New York City. The company has offices in Europe, Asia, North America, South America, Middle East, and South Africa.

Trammo owns production assets in North Bend, Ohio (Nitric Acid). Trammo also either owns or operates terminals in Meredosia and Niota, Illinois (Ammonia), Nanjing, Jiangsu, China (Ammonia), and Port of Batumi, Georgia (Sulfur and Finished Fertilizers).

== History ==
Transammonia, founded by Ronald P. Stanton in 1965, specialized in the international trade of ammonia. Transammonia has since evolved as a market leader in petroleum coke, sulfur, anhydrous ammonia, and sulfuric acid, with niche positions in nitric acid and finished fertilizer. The Company changed its name from Transammonia, Inc. to Trammo, Inc. on October 29, 2013. The Trammo trademark has long been associated with the company and had been the name of several subsidiaries. The name change reflected the current broad range of products and markets in which the company trades, in addition to ammonia.

In the fiscal year that ended on May 1, 1990, Transammonia posted sales of US$1.1 billion. In 2006, the company ventured into natural gas gathering in the United States. In 2007, the company was ranked by Forbes magazine as among the top 50 private companies in the United States. In 2012, the company was ranked as #24 by Forbes magazine in its list of the largest private companies in the United States. In 2022, the company was ranked as #13 in Crain's list of the largest privately held companies in the New York area and #133 in the Forbes magazine's list of the largest private companies in the United States. In the fiscal year that ended December 31, 2021, Trammo posted sales of over US$4.2 billion.

== Controversy ==
In 2010, Transammonia ended the dealings of its Swiss subsidiary, Trammo Trading, with Iranian companies, in part as a response to an investigation by CNBC regarding the company's involvement with entities within Iran. The United States has prohibitions against commerce in Iran, in part to persuade that country to disengage in nuclear development. Transammonia maintained that its foreign subsidiary's Iranian dealings were allowed under U.S. law, but decided to end them anyway. The company stated, "the small amount of business done there does not justify the reputational risk currently associated with doing business with entities located in Iran, due to the growing international concern over the policies of the current regime there."

== Products ==
- Anhydrous ammonia
- Fertilizer
- Nitric acid
- Petroleum coke
- Sulfur
- Sulfuric acid
