= Hannah Stanton =

English social worker and anti-apartheid activist

- from her 1961 book
- Born: 30 November 1913; Teddington
- Died: 9 December 1993 (aged 80); Esher
- Known for: anti-apartheid humanitarian

Hannah Margaret Stanton (30 November 1913 – 9 December 1993) was a British social worker and anti-apartheid activist. She was arrested in South Africa and was returned home as a "prohibited immigrant" in 1960 where she became a spokesperson for the anti-apartheid movement.

== Life ==
Stanton was born in Teddington in 1913. Her mother was Martha Grace (born Child) (1878–1953) and her father, Thomas Ernest Stanton, worked for the National Physics Laboratory becoming a Fellow of the Royal Society when she was a baby.

Her first work was a hospital almoner after graduating in 1936 after studying English at University College, London. She was employed at the David Lewis Northern Hospital and she stayed there until the end of the war. From 1945 to 1948 she was in Austria working with the Friends' Relief Service who were helping people displaced by the war.

She returned to university to study theology at Somerville College in Oxford. She had two brothers and one of them, Thomas, was a missionary in South Africa. She went to visit on holiday and decided to become a warden at a women's mission at Lady Selborne, Pretoria. She was employed to teach theology to the students but where she became involved in politics. She protested with and on behalf of the Black South Africans. Lady Selbourne was a suburb of Pretoria and since 1905 it had been an area where the native people were allowed to legally own land. The suburb was useful as it supplied cheap labour to Pretoria's white residents. However the area was too popular for the liking of the authorities, but they struggled to find a legal basis for seizing the land as the residents had freehold properties.

Stanton was arrested on 30 March 1960 and after a period of solitary confinement she found a new friend when she shared a cell with anti-apartheid activist Helen Joseph. Joseph was involved in an unsuccessful four-year trial accusing her of high treason. Stanton's arrest was politically embarrassing and she was returned home as a "prohibited immigrant" in May 1960 where she became a spokesperson for the anti-apartheid movement. In 1961 her book Go Well, Stay Well; South Africa, August 1956 to May 1960 was published to some acclaim documenting her time in South Africa.

Stanton died in 1993 in Esher.
