= Edwin van Cleef =

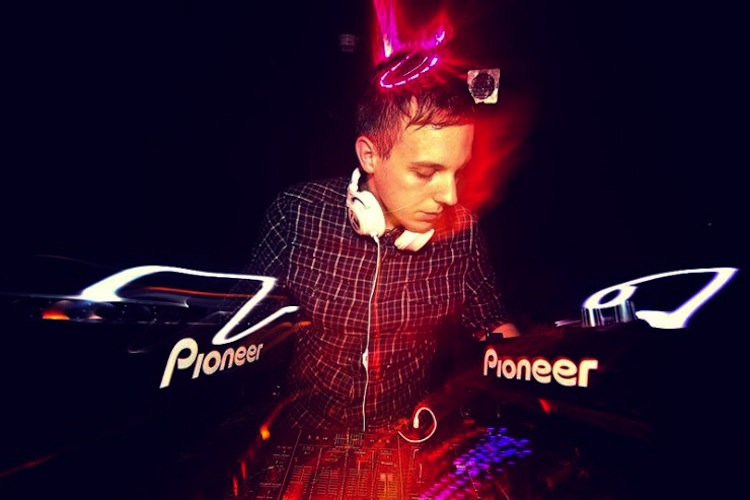
- Edwin van Cleef DJing at The Nest, London

Background information
- Born: Ash Howarth
- Genres: Nu-Disco, electroclash, synthpop, post-disco,
- Years active: 2009–present
- Label: Schmooze
- Website: www.edwinvancleef.co.uk

Ash Howarth, better known by his stage name Edwin van Cleef, is a nu-disco/electronic musician from Leeds, England.

== Career ==
In 2009 Edwin released his first EP entitled "Overtaken" on his own label, Space Disco. It included remixes from FM Attack, Neo Tokyo and Mille.

In 2011 Edwin released his cover of Phoenix – Lisztomania featuring Kids at Midnight singer Jane Elizabeth Hanley. Lisztomania received widespread coverage from multiple Music Blogs around the world as well as appearing on Ministry of Sound's Uncovered Volume 3 in Australia and Off The Rocker's Sofa Disco compilation released on Avex in Japan.

Around the same time, Edwin's second EP entitled "Never Be Alone at Night" was released on the label Schmooze, including the songs "Never Be alone at Night feat. Gemini Club", "Triton" and "I Feel You". The title track also appeared on the Fierce Disco V Compilation.

Edwin van Cleef has been playlisted by major DJs such as Laidback Luke, The Aston Shuffle, and Matt Darey and has also had songs playlisted by DJs on radio stations such as BBC Radio 1 in the UK and Triple J in Australia.

As well as his own material, Edwin has officially remixed artists such as Chilly Gonzales, Nelly Furtado, Shinichi Osawa and The Knocks. Unofficial remixes include the likes of John Legend, Phoenix and Metronomy.

== Discography ==
=== Singles and EPs ===
- "Overtaken" (2009)
- "Never Be Alone at Night" (2011)
- "Falling/Nala" (2011)
- "All I Think About Is You" (2012)
- "Two As One" (2013)

=== Remixes ===
- Freshlovers – Beverley Hills Chase (2009)
- Vicknoise – Get Away (2010)
- Jolly – Da Bump (2010)
- Funkstar Deluxe – Do You Feel (2010)
- Housse de Racket – Champions (2010)
- The Futureheads – Heartbeat Song (2011)
- Chilly Gonzales – You Can Dance (2011)
- Shinichi Osawa feat. Tommie Sunshine – Love Will Guide You (2011)
- Nelly Furtado – The Night Is Young (2011)
- The Penelopes – Sally in the Galaxy (2012)
- John Legend – Rolling in the Deep (2012)
- Mighty Mouse – Between The Pavement and the Stars (2012)
- Allan Guevara – You Know (2012)
- Cosmo Black – Blind (2012)
- The Knocks – The Feeling (2013)
- Phoenix – Trying To Be Cool (2013)
- Metronomy – I'm Aquarius (2013)

=== Covers ===
- Phoenix – Lisztomania (2011)
