= Patrick Stanton =

American disc jockey, music historian, radio personality, voice actor, and actor

- Born: Patrick Joseph Stanton; May 22, 1907; Cork, Ireland
- Died: March 1, 1976 (aged 68); Philadelphia, Pennsylvania, U.S.
- Education: Holy Ghost Preparatory School
- Occupation(s): Disc jockey, radio personality, radio station owner
- Years active: 1927–1976
- Spouse: Mary De Mey (m. 1937)
- Children: 3

Patrick Joseph Stanton (May 22, 1907 – March 1, 1976) was an American radio personality, disc jockey, businessman, and a cultural figure in the city of Philadelphia for almost fifty years. He was the originator and host of the Irish Hour radio program that aired on various stations from 1926–1976, and the owner of the city's WJMJ radio station, from 1947 to 1965. Stanton also served as the president of the Poor Richard Club, and as press secretary to Philadelphia Mayor James Tate.

== Early life and work ==
Stanton was born in County Cork, in 1907, the 8th of 16 children. He emigrated to the United States as a child and lived with a widowed aunt in Philadelphia. He almost did not make it to the New World, as only a case of "Scarletina" or Scarlet Fever, kept him from boarding the Titanic. He travelled on another White Star ocean liner, the Haverford, arriving safely in America and settling in Philadelphia.

Stanton attended Holy Ghost Prep School and as a young man he joined local theater companies and later had a stint making films and doing vaudeville in New York City. But the stage career did not take off and he ultimately found his vocation in radio.

== Radio career ==
Stanton started out as a radio announcer for WIAD, broadcasting from the Essex hotel. He began writing and delivering ad copy to supplement his announcer's salary. The station later became WELK and finally WDAS.

Stanton became Philadelphia's pioneer DJ and originated the Irish Hour radio program that was a mainstay in the city for decades. The program featured ninety minutes of Irish music, news and interviews pitched at the city's Irish community from 1926 until Stanton's death, just days before the program's 50th anniversary in 1976.

In the late 1930s, when the anti-semitic priest Father Charles Coughlin came to prominence, Stanton's station refused to carry his broadcasts, a decision that prompted Coughlin's backers to picket the station. Coughlin did not air again on WDAS during Stanton's tenure as vice-president of the station.

Stanton's radio voice was called a "baritone with a haunting lilt." In Erin's Heirs, Irish Bonds of Community, author Dennis Clark described his Irish Hour as

. . . a tonic against loneliness, a weekly feast of musical delights, and an invitation to weekly dances, concerts, meetings, and festivities of ardent sociability. The depersonalization and disillusionments of the city might loom on every side, but at Sunday noon, after the racing melody of "O'Sullivan Mor" when Pat Stanton's familiar voice welcomed the Irish to commune with the spirit of their own tradition, the old feelings of warmth and Celtic vitality were renewed, and the Irish heard once again all of the echoing gaiety, melancholy, and drama of their past.

Stanton left WDAS in 1946 and formed his own company and station, WJMJ, for "Jesus, Mary, and Joseph," and continued the Irish Hour program for the rest of his life. WJMJ also carried other ethnic hours for the diverse city, including the Greek Hour, the Polish Hour, and the Italian Hour, and Stanton himself performed a Yiddish language program in which his script was translated into phonetics that he could deliver. His love for Ireland permeated his work and he organized many benefits for Irish churches and religious orders during his radio career.

Stanton served as President of the Philadelphia Radio and Television Broadcasters Association in 1953. He was the Person of the Year for Philadelphia's Broadcast Pioneers in 1972 and earned posthumous admission to its Hall of Fame in 2003.

== Films ==
Stanton produced some of the earliest travelogues of Ireland for an American audience including "Here is Ireland," which premiered at the Belmont Movie Theater in West Philadelphia in 1939 and earned fine reviews. It was among the first full-color features about the Emerald Isle and enjoyed in both Ireland and the U.S.A. The film featured Stanton's lifelong friend, the third President of Ireland, Eamon de Valera.

== Politics ==
Stanton joked that he was such a chronic Republican that he "didn't even vote for Kennedy." Nonetheless, Democratic mayor James Tate lured Stanton out of retirement to serve as his press secretary in 1968. Stanton retired from City Hall in 1970.

In 1966, Stanton was Grand Marshal of Philadelphia's St. Patrick's Day Parade.

== Retirement ==
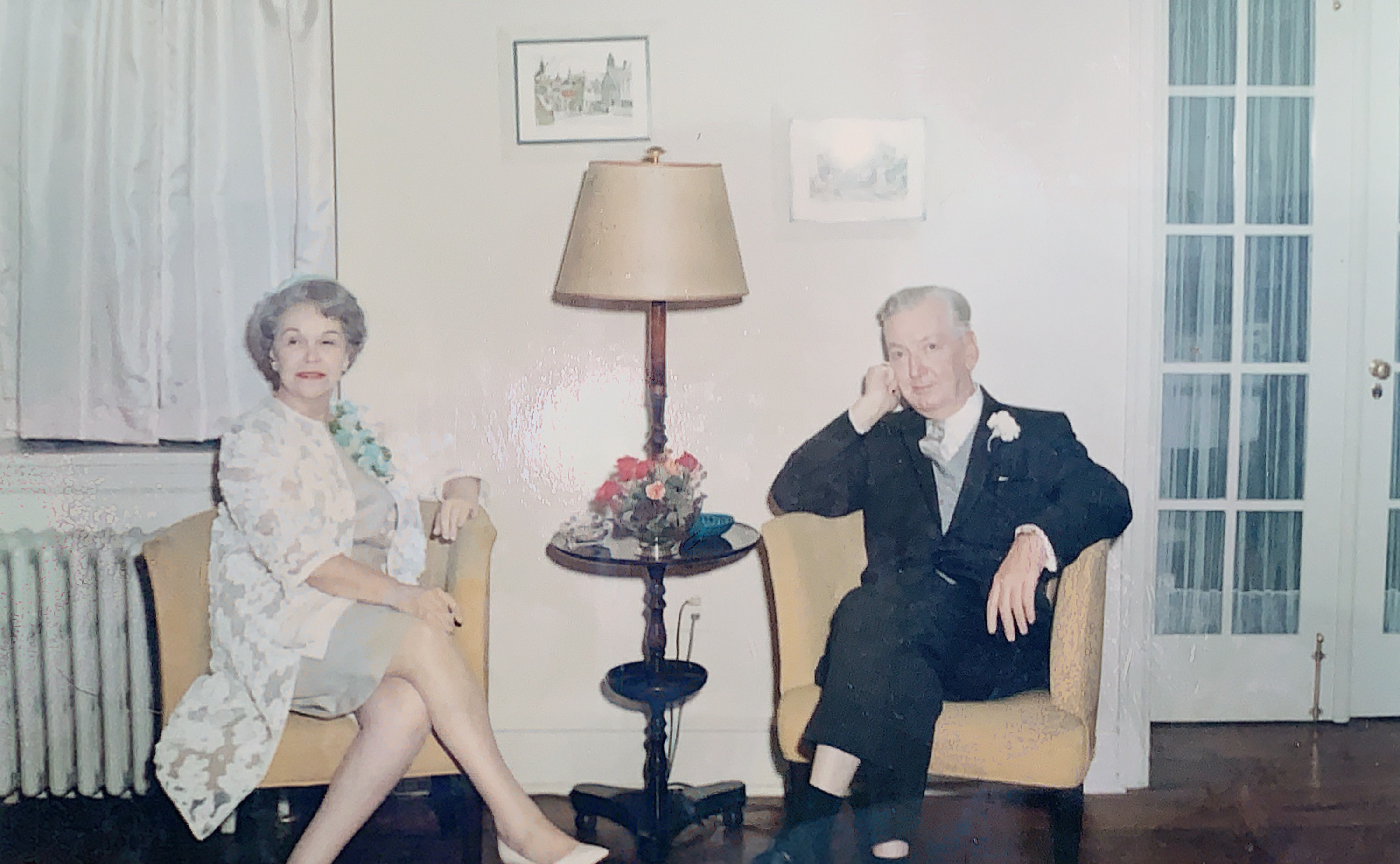
Patrick Stanton and Mary (De Mey) Stanton, 1967

After a career described as an "unstoppable surge of luck and hustle," Stanton retired in 1970, though he continued to produce and host the Irish Hour for six more years. Many of his papers are collected and on file with the Philadelphia Historical Society.

== Personal life ==
In 1937 Stanton married Mary De Mey from Southwest Philadelphia. They had three children, Mary Ellen, Patrick, and Suzanne, who in turn had 10 children and 23 grandchildren. He died in 1976. His wife Mary died in 1996.
