= Burch colposuspension =

Procedure to treat urinary incontinence

- Specialty: Urologist

The Burch colposuspension is a procedure to treat urinary incontinence due to pelvic floor relaxation. The paravaginal fascia is attached to Cooper's ligament. The purpose is to suspend the prolapsed urethra so that the urethrovesical junction and proximal urethra are replaced in the abdominal cavity.
