= Urogynecology =

Sub-specialty of urology and gynecology

Urogynecologist
Occupation
- Names: Doctor, Medical Specialist, Surgeon
- Occupation type: Gynecology, Urology, Specialty, Surgery
- Activity sectors: Medicine, Surgery

Description
- Competencies: Patient Care, Education, Research
- Education required: Doctor of Medicine (MD); Doctor of Osteopathic Medicine (DO); Bachelor of Medicine, Bachelor of Surgery (MBBS/MBChB)
- Fields of employment: Hospitals, Clinics
- Related jobs: Gynecologist, Urologist

Urogynecology or urogynaecology is a surgical sub-specialty of urology and gynecology.

== History ==
In 1893, Howard Kelly, a gynecologist and pioneering urogynecologist, invented an air cystoscope which was simply a handheld, hollow tube with a glass partition. When the American Surgical Society, later the American College of Surgeons, met in Baltimore in 1900, a contest was held between Howard Kelly and Hugh Hampton Young, who is often considered the father of modern urology. Using his air cystoscope, Kelly inserted ureteral catheters in a female patient in just 3 minutes. Young equaled this time in a male patient. So began the friendly competitive rivalry between gynecologists and urologists in the area of female urology and urogynecology. This friendly competition continued for decades. In modern times, the mutual interest of obstetricians, gynecologists, and urologists in pelvic floor problems in women has led to a more collaborative effort.

In the UK, the rivalry between the specialities was an obstacle but Stuart Stanton introduced and established the combined subspeciality after visiting the US in the 1970s to learn the techniques.

== Education and training ==
Urogynecologists are medical professionals who have been to medical school and achieved their basic medical degree, followed by postgraduate training in Obstetrics and Gynaecology (OB-GYN). They then undertake further training in Urogynecology to achieve accreditation/board certification in this subspecialty. Training programme requirements and duration varies from country to country but usually tend to be around 2–3 years in most places. Urogynaecology fellowship programmes are available in some countries, but not all and the levels of formal accreditation and certification vary from country to country.

The International Urogynecological Association (IUGA) is a global body for professionals practising in the field of urogynaecology and female pelvic medicine and reconstructive surgery. IUGA facilitates training for physicians from countries which do not have formal training programmes by maintaining and publishing a directory of fellowship programmes. IUGA also provides educational opportunities for urogynecologists both online and in-person, develops terminology and standardization for the field. The International Continence Society (ICS) is another global organization which strives to improve the quality of life for people affected by urinary, bowel and pelvic floor disorders through education, and research.

== Scope of practice ==
Urogynecology is a sub-specialty of Gynecology, and in some countries is also known as Female Pelvic Medicine and Reconstructive Surgery. A urogynecologist manages clinical problems associated with dysfunction of the pelvic floor and bladder. Pelvic floor disorders affect the bladder, reproductive organs, and bowels. Common pelvic floor disorders include urinary incontinence, pelvic organ prolapse and fecal incontinence. Increasingly, Urogynecologists are also responsible for the care of women who have experienced trauma to the perineum during childbirth.

There is some crossover with the subspecialty of Female Urology - these doctors are urologists who undergo additional training to be able to manage female urinary incontinence, pelvic organ prolapse and interstitial cystitis/PBS. In addition, there are colorectal surgeons who have a special interest in anal incontinence and pelvic floor dysfunction related to rectal function. Contemporary urogynecological practice encourages multidisciplinary teams working in the care of patients, with collaborative input from urogynecologists, urologists, colorectal surgeons, elderly care physicians, and physiotherapists. This is especially important in the care of patients with complex problems, e.g. those who have undergone previous surgery or who have combined incontinence and prolapse, or combined urinary and bowel problems. Multidisciplinary team meetings are an important part of the management pathway of these women.

Urogynaecologists manage women with urinary incontinence and pelvic floor dysfunction. The clinical conditions that a urogynecologist may see include stress incontinence, overactive bladder, voiding difficulty, bladder pain, urethral pain, vaginal or uterine prolapse, obstructed defecation, anal incontinence, and perineal injury. They may also care for women with vesicovaginal or rectovaginal fistulae with specialist training, and in conjunction with other specialties.

Patients will usually be assessed using a combination of history taking, examination (including pelvic examination and assessment of prolapse using validated systems such as the Pelvic Organ Prolapse Quantification System and assessment of quality of life impact using validated questionnaires, including the assessment of sexual function, using Pelvic Organ Prolapse/Incontinence Sexual Questionnaire IUGA- Revised [PISQ-IR]. A bladder diary is often used to quantify an individual's fluid intake, and the number of voids per day and night, as well as the volume the bladder can hold on a day-to-day basis. Further investigations might include urodynamics or a cystoscopy. Treatment usually starts with conservative measures such as pelvic floor muscle training, fluid and food modification or bladder training. Drug therapies can be used for overactive bladder, which may include antimuscarinic drugs or beta 3 receptor agonists - both of these help to control the urgency that is the key component of overactive bladder. If medications fail, more invasive options such as injections of botulinum toxin into the bladder muscle, or neuromodulation are other options for symptom relief. Surgical treatments can be offered for stress incontinence and/or uterovaginal prolapse if pelvic floor muscle training is unsuccessful.

Urogynecological problems are seldom life-threatening, but they do have a major impact on the quality of life of affected individuals. Urogynecologists will usually use quality of life improvement as a treatment goal, and there is a major focus on optimising symptoms using conservative measures before embarking on more invasive treatments.

Some conditions treated in urogynecology practice include:

- Cystocele
- Enterocele
- Female genital prolapse
- Fecal incontinence
- Urinary incontinence
- Interstitial cystitis
- Lichen planus
- Lichen sclerosus
- Müllerian agenesis
- Overactive bladder
- Painful intercourse
- Pelvic organ prolapse
- Rectocele
- Rectovaginal fistula
- Recurrent urinary tract infections
- Urinary incontinence
- Urinary retention
- Vaginal agenesis
- Vaginal septum
- Vesicocutaneous fistula
- Vesicouterine fistula
- Vesicovaginal fistula
- Voiding difficulties

Diagnostic tests and procedures performed include:

- Cystourethroscopy
- Urodynamic testing
- Ultrasound

Specialty treatments available include:

- Abdominal reconstruction
- Behavioral modification
- Biofeedback
- Botulinum toxin injection
- Dietary modification
- Fascial grafts
- Laparoscopic reconstruction
- Medications
- Pelvic floor re-education
- Pessary (for prolapse and incontinence)
- Pubovaginal slings
- Relaxation techniques
- Robotic reconstruction
- Sacral nerve stimulation
- Urethral injections
- Urethral reconstruction
- Urge suppression drills
- Vaginal reconstruction

== See also ==
- J. Marion Sims – father of American gynecology. Best known for repairing vesicovaginal fistulas.
- Howard Atwood Kelly – famous American gynecologist.
