= Keith Stanton =

British legal academic

Keith Stanton is a British legal academic who was head of the Law Department at the University of Bristol. Stanton is the co-editor of The Common Law World Review, and has been elected President of the Society of Legal Scholars for 2011-2012.
