= Phoebe Stanton (teacher) =

Phoebe Pittar Stanton (c. 1844 – January 1940) was a teacher and co-principal of a private boarding school "Blanche Villa" in Glenelg, South Australia.

== History ==
Stanton was a daughter of Anglican clergyman Rev. Lionel William Stanton (died 1897), who emigrated to South Australia in 1864 aboard the steamer Eastern Empire. He served as rector of St Mary's Church, Kooringa (a suburb of Burra) 1864–1874 and also operated a small school there. He returned to England, where he was made rector of Coombe Keynes, Dorset, England. Some time around 1870, his wife Anna Thipps Stanton founded "Blanche Villa" in a huge 16-roomed residence on Glenelg's Broadway, running the school with the aid of her eldest daughters, Esther, who died in 1918 and is remembered by a stained glass window in St Peter's Church, Glenelg, Phoebe, and Annie, who died in England in 1922. At first it was strictly a boarding school for girls, who beside the "three 'R's" were taught Latin and French, painting and embroidery. It later became a preparatory school for boys under 12 years of age.

The school closed sometime around 1910, but at least one person, Thorburn Brailsford Robertson, continued to board with Miss Stanton, in his case until he graduated from university in 1905.

In retirement, Phoebe Stanton was a familiar sight in Glenelg, transporting herself on a tricycle. She died in 1940, aged 95.

Among her past students were physiologist Thorburn Brailsford Robertson and violinist Eugene Alderman (c. 1884 – 13 June 1916).

Her siblings include:

- Lionel William Stanton (14 October 1843 – 15 August 1925), for some years Assistant Inspector-General of Education for South Australia. He was awarded the ISO in 1915.
- Kathleen Pittar Stanton ( – 3 June 1929), who married S. G. Kingston.
