= Ronald Stanton =

- Born: Ronald Philip Steinberg; March 26, 1928; Wiesbaden, Germany
- Died: September 26, 2016 (age 88); Manhattan, New York
- Spouse(s): Ruth Schloss (divorced); Mei Wu (divorced)
- Children: with Schloss: --Oliver Stanton with Wu: --Hedi Stanton --Philip Stanton

Ronald P. Stanton (March 26, 1928 – September 26, 2016) was an American businessman who founded Transammonia Inc (now Trammo, Inc).

== Biography ==
Stanton was born Ronald Philip Steinberg to a Jewish family in Wiesbaden, Germany on March 26, 1928, the son of Hedwig (née Kern) and Eric Steinberg. His parents divorced when he was one and he and his mother moved in with her parents. In 1937, he and his mother fled from Nazi Germany to New York City. His paternal grandparents remained in Germany where they committed suicide in order to avoid being taken to the concentration camps.

Stanton attended public schools and changed his surname to "Stanton" after high school. In 1950, he earned a B.A. from the City College of New York and then served in the United States Army. After his service, he went to work for the International Ore and Fertilizer Corporation eventually becoming executive vice president of the fertilizer trading division. In 1965, he left the company and founded his own specialized trading and distribution company then named Transammonia Inc. Trammo grew rapidly marketing, trading, distributing, and transporting ammonia, fertilizers, liquefied petroleum gases, petrochemicals, coal, sulfuric acid, and sulfur. By 2009, it was one of the largest privately owned companies in New York.

== Philanthropy ==
Stanton typically donated anonymously. In 2008, he donated $25 million to Lincoln Center (the plaza at Lincoln Center is named Ronald P. Stanton Way). In 2006, he donated $100 million gift to Yeshiva University. He ultimately gave away $300 million during his life, mostly in New York. Stanton served on the boards of Yeshiva University, Lincoln Center, NewYork-Presbyterian Hospital, and the Brooklyn Academy of Music.

== Personal life ==
Stanton was married twice. His first wife was Ruth Schloss; they had one son, Oliver Stanton before divorcing. His second wife was Mei Wu; they had two children: Hedi Stanton and Philip Stanton before divorcing. Stanton was an art collector owning works by Renoir, Matisse, and Picasso.
