= International Continence Society =

UK charity

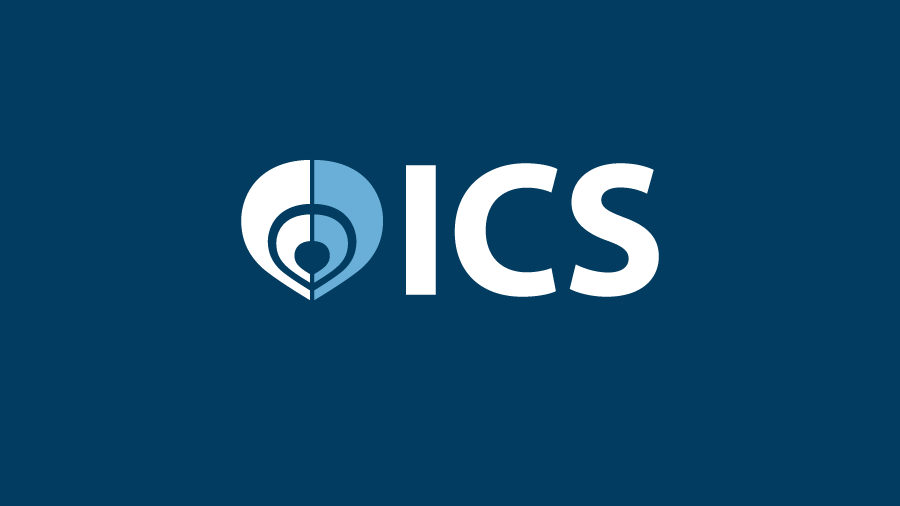
- Formation: 1971
- Type: International non-governmental organization
- Headquarters: Bristol, UK
- Region served: Worldwide
- General Secretary: Professor David Castro Diaz
- Website: www.ics.org

The International Continence Society (ICS) is a registered UK charity with a global health focus on the development in the field of incontinence.

It strives to improve the quality of life for people affected by urinary, bowel and pelvic floor disorders by advancing basic and clinical science through education, research, and advocacy. Its membership is multi-disciplinary, some of the fields covered being urology, gynaecology, neurology, physiotherapy, and nursing.

The official journal of the ICS is the Journal of Neurourology and Urodynamics, published as six bi-monthly issues.

The ICS Annual Meeting was first held in Exeter in 1971. It attracts over 3,000 delegates, with recent locations being Philadelphia 2018, Florence 2017, Tokyo 2016, Montreal Canada 2015, Rio de Janeiro 2014, Barcelona 2013, Beijing 2012, Glasgow 2011, Toronto 2010, San Francisco 2009, Cairo 2008, Rotterdam 2007, Christchurch 2006, Montreal 2005, Paris 2004, Florence 2003, Heidelberg 2002 and Seoul 2001.

The ICS has 13 committees covering different disciplines and areas of incontinence which work on projects relating to the committees purpose:

- Board of Trustees
- Education Committee
- Scientific Committee
- Standardization Steering Committee
- Nursing Committee
- Physiotherapy Committee
- Developing World Committee
- Neurourology Promotion Committee
- Urodynamics Committee
- Ethics Committee
- Publications and Communications Committee
- Children and Young Adults Committee
- Meetings Committee

== World Continence Week ==
The ICS Continence Promotion Committee initiated World Continence Day at the ICS annual meeting in Cairo, 2008, which then became World Continence Week in 2009, to promote awareness of continence and remove the stigma attached to the issue. It is held in the last full week of June each year, in which medical professionals who work within the field of incontinence hold public events to inform he general public on the subject of incontinence with the aim of raise awareness about incontinence related issues, and inform the public of where they can seek help.

World Continence week is now observed in over 24 countries worldwide including South Korea, China, Singapore, Poland, Slovakia, New Zealand, Germany, Canada, the United States, the United Kingdom, Australia, the Netherlands and Belgium.
