= Thomas Ernest Stanton =

British mechanical engineer (1865–1931)

Sir Thomas Ernest Stanton CBE FRS
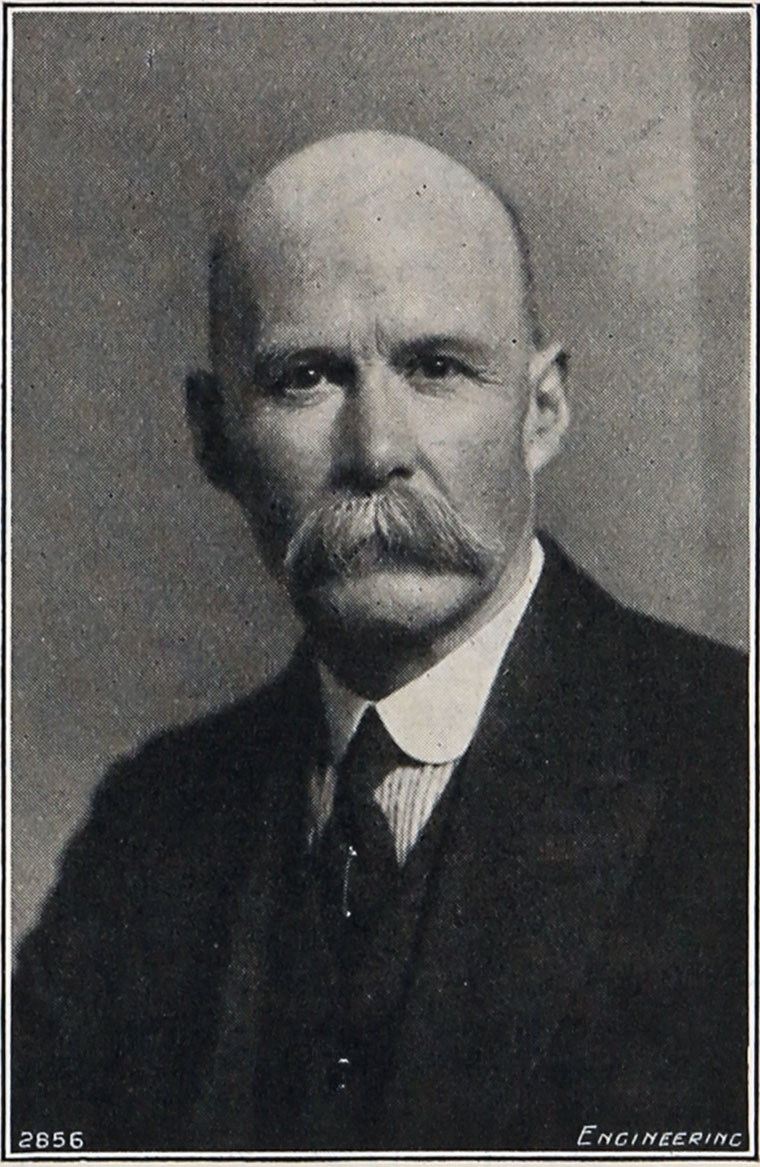
- Born: 12 December 1865; Atherstone, Warwickshire, UK
- Died: 30 August 1931 (aged 65); Pevensey Bay
- Known for: Stanton number
- Spouse: Martha Grace Child
- Children: 3, including Hannah Margaret Stanton

Academic background
- Education: Owens College, Manchester; University of Liverpool

Academic work
- Discipline: mechanical engineering
- Institutions: University College, Bristol; National Physical Laboratory
- Main interests: fluid dynamics and tribology

Sir Thomas Ernest Stanton CBE FRS (12 December 1865 – 30 August 1931) was a British mechanical engineer and a specialist in fluid dynamics and tribology. He was the first to construct a supersonic wind tunnel in 1921. The eponymous Stanton number is based on his research on the transfer of heat between metal surfaces through a separating thin layer of lubricating fluid.

== Life ==
Stanton was born at Atherstone, Warwickshire, to plumber Thomas and his wife Mary Ann Wagstaff. Educated at the local grammar school, he then apprenticed at Gimson and Co. engineers before going to Owens College, Manchester in 1887. He received a BSc in engineering in 1891 and worked for five years under Professor Osborne Reynolds. He then joined the University of Liverpool in 1896 and received a DSc in 1898 and became a professor the next year at University College, Bristol. He joined the National Physical Laboratory in 1901 and was involved in the testing of materials. He began wind tunnel studies in 1903 and by 1921 he had constructed a supersonic wind tunnel of 3 inch diameter going to 3.2 times the speed of sound for testing projectiles. This work was conducted secretly for the Britain's Ordnance Committee. It was here that he and Dorothy Marshall made studies on heat flow and found a relation between surface heat transfer rate, temperature difference and friction coefficients that is now known as Stanton number. Stanton was elected Fellow of the Royal Society in 1914 and was knighted in 1928 for his contributions to the wartime effort.

Stanton married Martha Grace Child in 1912 and they had two sons and a daughter, Hannah Margaret Stanton who was a leading anti-apartheid activist. He retired in 1930 and was living at Pevensy Bay where he was recovering after one surgery and preparing for another. His body was found, drowned, dressed in night clothes on 30 August 1931 off the beach near his family home.
