= Bill Stanton (gridiron football) =

American gridiron football player (1924–2010)

No. 53, 51
- Positions: Halfback, End

Personal information
- Born: April 21, 1924); Dillon, South Carolina, U.S.
- Died: May 9, 2010 (aged 86); Garner, North Carolina, U.S.
- Listed height: 6 ft 2 in (1.88 m)
- Listed weight: 210 lb (95 kg)

Career information
- High school: South Robeson (Rowland, North Carolina)
- College: North Carolina State (1945–1947)
- NFL draft: 1948: 27th round, 252nd overall pick

Career history

Playing
- Buffalo Bills (1949); Ottawa Rough Riders (1950–1952)

Coaching
- Ottawa Rough Riders (1953) Line coach

Awards and highlights
- Grey Cup champion (1951)
- Stats at Pro Football Reference

William McKinnon Stanton (April 21, 1924 – May 9, 2010) was an American professional football player who played for the Ottawa Rough Riders. He won the Grey Cup with them in 1951. He previously played football for and attended North Carolina State University, and in 1949 for the Buffalo Bills of the All-America Football Conference (AAFC). He died in 2010.
