= John Stanton (cricketer) =

English cricketer

Personal information
- Born: 8 March 1901; Bristol, England
- Died: 27 June 1973 (aged 72); Midhurst, Sussex
- Batting: Right-handed

Domestic team information
- Years: Team
- 1921–1922: Gloucestershire
- Source: Cricinfo, 26 March 2014

John Stanton (8 March 1901 – 27 June 1973) was an English cricketer. He played for Gloucestershire between 1921 and 1922.
