= John A. Stanton =

American painter

John Aloysius Stanton
- Born: September 15, 1857; Grass Valley, California, U.S.
- Died: August 25, 1929 (aged 71); Palo Alto, California, U.S.
- Burial place: Holy Cross Cemetery
- Occupations: Painter, educator, academic administrator
- Known for: landscape and religious paintings
- Spouse: Anita H. Banahan (m. 1895–?)
- Children: 5

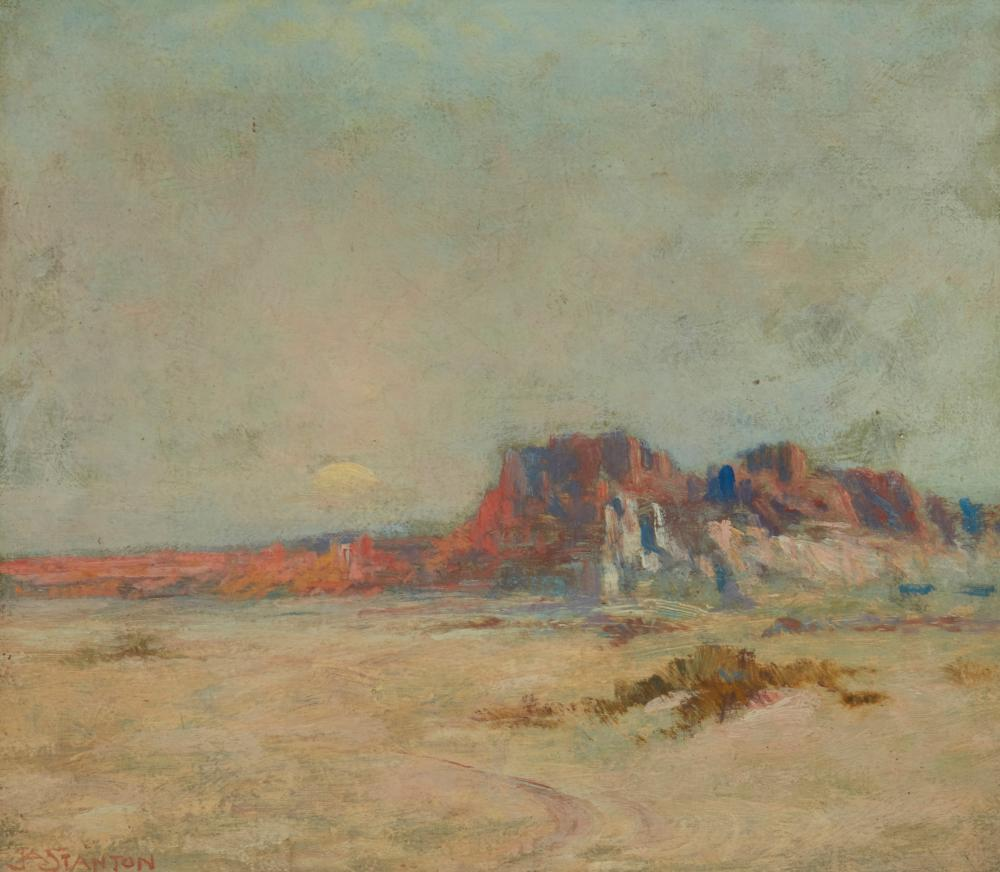
John Stanton (1857-1929) Desert bluffs Oil on canvas Signed lower left

John Aloysius Stanton (September 15, 1857 – August 25, 1929) was an American landscape and religious painter. He was a professor and the dean of faculty of the San Francisco Art Institute.

== Life ==
John Aloysius Stanton was born on September 15, 1857, in Grass Valley, California. When he was a child, his family moved to San Francisco's Mission District. Stanton attended St. Ignatius High School (now St. Ignatius College Preparatory), a private, Catholic preparatory school in San Francisco.

Stanton was a landscape and religious painter. He was a professor at the San Francisco Art Institute for 26 years, and he also served as its dean of faculty. He was a member of the Bohemian Club.

With his wife Anita (née Banahan), Stanton had three daughters and two sons. They moved in 1904 to Palo Alto, California, where he died on August 25, 1929.

His neighbor in Palo Alto was a young Paul Twohig Carey (1900–2001) whom he gave art lessons to, and Carey went on to become a notable artist. Other notable students of Stanton include Ethel McAllister Grubb, and Louise Crow. His work can be seen at the Fine Arts Museums of San Francisco and the Harvard Art Museums.
