= John Stanton (basketball) =

American basketball player

Personal information
- Born: June 2, 1921 Chicago, Illinois, U.S.
- Died: February 1, 1989 (aged 67)
- Listed height: 6 ft 0 in (1.83 m)
- Listed weight: 175 lb (79 kg)

Career information
- High school: St. George (Evanston, Illinois)
- College: Loyola Chicago (1940–1943)
- Playing career: 1942–1950
- Position: Guard

Career history
- 1942–1943: Chicago Ramblers
- 1946–1947: Anderson Duffey Packers
- 1947: Chicago Shamrocks
- 1949–1950: Racine Knights

John Thomas Stanton (June 2, 1921 – February 1, 1989) was an American professional basketball player. He appeared in seven games for the Anderson Duffey Packers in the National Basketball League during the 1946–47 season.

Stanton spent one semester attending Villanova University before transferring to Loyola University Chicago, where he played varsity basketball from his sophomore through senior seasons.
