= Henry Stanton (soldier) =

American military officer (c. 1796–1856)

Henry Stanton (c. 1796–1856) was a United States Army officer who was brevetted brigadier-general for meritorious conduct in the Mexican War (1846–1848).

== Biography ==
Stanton was born in Vermont around 1796. He was appointed a lieutenant in the light artillery on June 29, 1813, and an assistant deputy quartermaster-general in July of the same year. He was then appointed military secretary to General George Izard in 1814, followed by a role as deputy quartermaster-general, with the rank of major on May 13, 1820. He served as adjutant-general under General Thomas S. Jesup in Florida from 1836 to 1837, and as assistant quartermaster-general, with the rank of colonel from 7 July 7, 1838, and was brevetted brigadier-general for meritorious conduct in the Mexican War on January 1, 1847. He died at Fort Hamilton, New York on 1 August 1856.
