= Henry de Stanton =

English jurist, churchman and university chancellor

Henry de Stanton (also Staunton) was an English medieval Canon law jurist, judge, churchman, and university chancellor.

Henry de Stanton was a Professor of Canon law. Between 1280 and 1282, he was Chancellor of the University of Oxford. During his chancellorship, the university appointed a group of masters to investigate how to put the Will of William of Durham (died 1249) into effect to establish University College at Oxford.

Henry de Stanton was vicar of St Peter's-in-the-East in Oxford. He was also a commissary judge and an official of the Court of the Arches.

Academic offices
Preceded by John de Pontissara	Chancellor of the University of Oxford; 1280–1282	Succeeded by William de Montfort
