= Chalking =

Chalking may refer to:

- Chalking – the progressive powdering of the paint film on a painted surface
- Chalking the door – Christian tradition of blessing one's home
- Chalking the door (eviction) – Scottish legal practice
- Warchalking – Graffiti indicating open Wi-Fi

== See also ==
- Chalk – Soft carbonate rock
