= Chislehurst Caves =

Former mine in London, England

Coordinates: 51.4074°N 0.0575°E

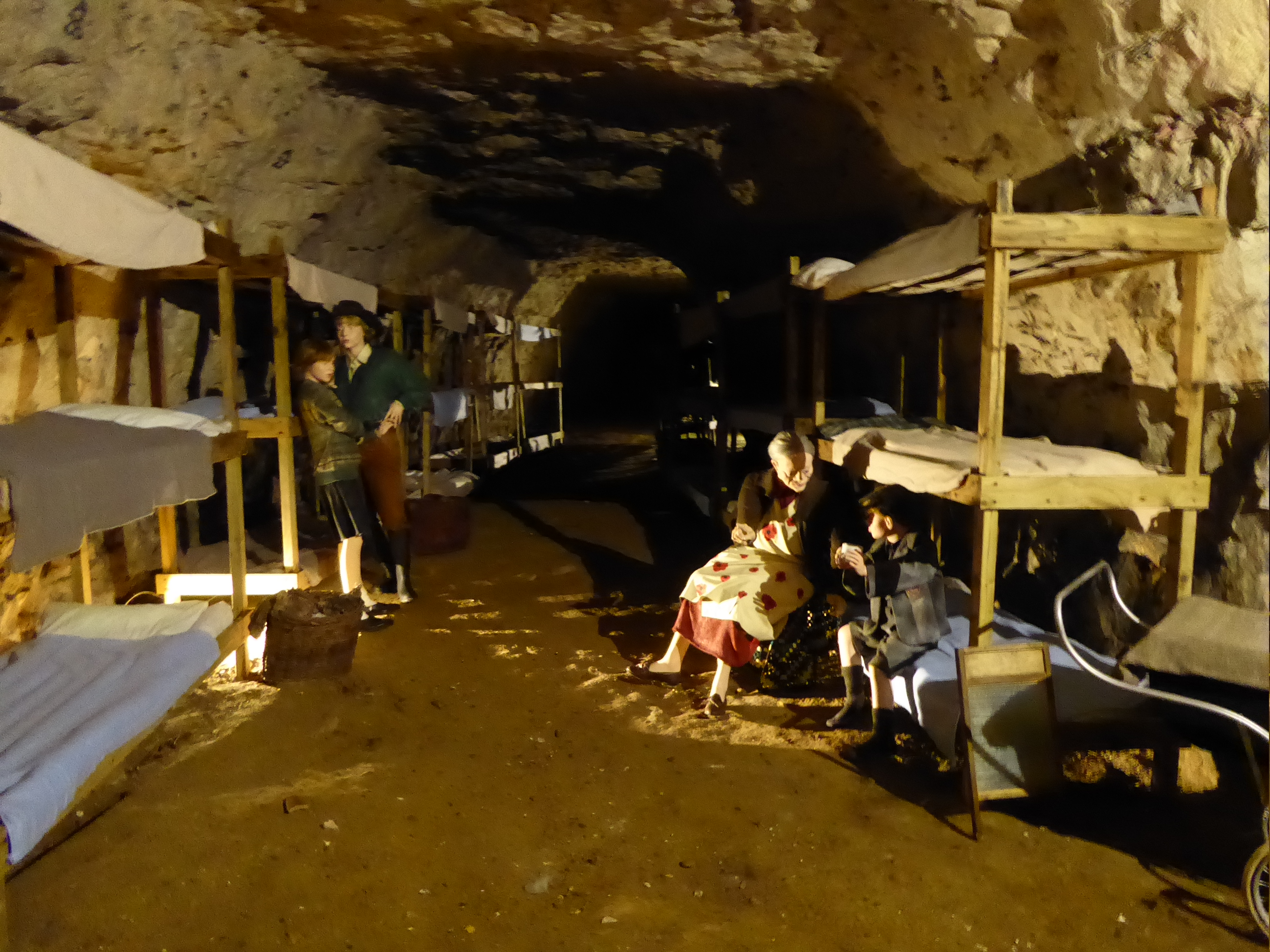
A recreation of a Second World War dormitory in Chislehurst Caves

The Chislehurst Caves are a series of intersecting man-made tunnels and caverns covering some 22 miles (35.4 km) in Chislehurst in the London Borough of Bromley.

Today the caves are a tourist attraction and, although they are called caves, they are entirely man-made and were dug and used as chalk and flint mines. The earliest recorded mention of the mines and lime-burning kilns above dates from a 9th-century Saxon charter and then not again until around 1232AD; they are believed to have been last worked in the 1840s. From the mid-13th to early 19th centuries the "caves" were created and expanded from the mining of raw chalk, flint and lime-burning chalk.

During World War I the caves were used as an ammunition storage dump associated with the Royal Arsenal at Woolwich. In the 1930s the tunnels were used for mushroom cultivation.

== Second World War shelter ==
When the aerial bombardment of London began in September 1940, the caves were used as an air-raid shelter. Soon they became an underground city accommodating up to 15,000 inhabitants (who each paid a penny to enter). The tunnels were fitted with electric lighting, toilets and washing facilities; a chapel was built and also a hospital.

The caves are located close to Chislehurst railway station and many people arrived there to then enter the shelter. Shortly after VE Day the shelter was officially closed. There was one child born in the caves, christened in the cave chapel with the name of Cavena Wakeman, who had the name until she turned 18, when she legally changed her first name to Rose and using Cavena as her middle name.

== Mythology ==
In 1903, William Nichols, then Vice President of the British Archaeological Association, produced a theory that the mines were made by the Druids, Romans and Saxons. This theory was used to give names to the three parts of the caves: tour guides point out supposed Druid altars and Roman features. However, this is based on Dr Nichols' writings and has not been verified.

The earliest documented evidence for a chalk cave is in 1737. (However, the earliest recorded mention of the mines and lime-burning kilns above, dates from a 9th-century Saxon charter and then not again until around 1232, this being that most likely because there was no taxation on them prior to 1232.) An opposing article in the next issue showed the similarity of the workings to coal mines in the Newcastle area, and argued that most of the excavation had been made in the last two centuries and that the evidence for any dene-holes was slight. However, a dene-hole does exist in what is known as the middle section.

The caves were used between 1830 and the 1860s for producing lime. The 25-inch to a mile (approx 1:2,500) Ordnance Survey map of 1862–63 describes the place as a "chalk pit" and marks an "engine house" and two remaining kilns. A further investigation produced, among other evidence, a letter from the son of one of the workers.

== TV and film ==
The caves have appeared in several television programmes including episodes of Doctor Who from 1972 titled The Mutants. In an episode of Seven Natural Wonders presented by Bill Oddie, the caves were presented as one of the wonders of the London area. The caves were also used in the films Beat Girl, The Tribe and Inseminoid and in music videos for metal bands Iron Maiden - ("Can I Play With Madness") – and "Cradle of Filth". They appear in Episode Five of The Tyrant King (1968).

The caves featured in two episodes of Most Haunted. A 20-year investigation into the haunting of the caves by author James Wilkinson containing the testimonies of many of the guides and owners over a 50-year period was published in 2011 entitled The Ghosts of Chislehurst Caves.

James Braxton visited the caves on Antiques Road Trip's Series 23, episode 6.

== Music venue ==
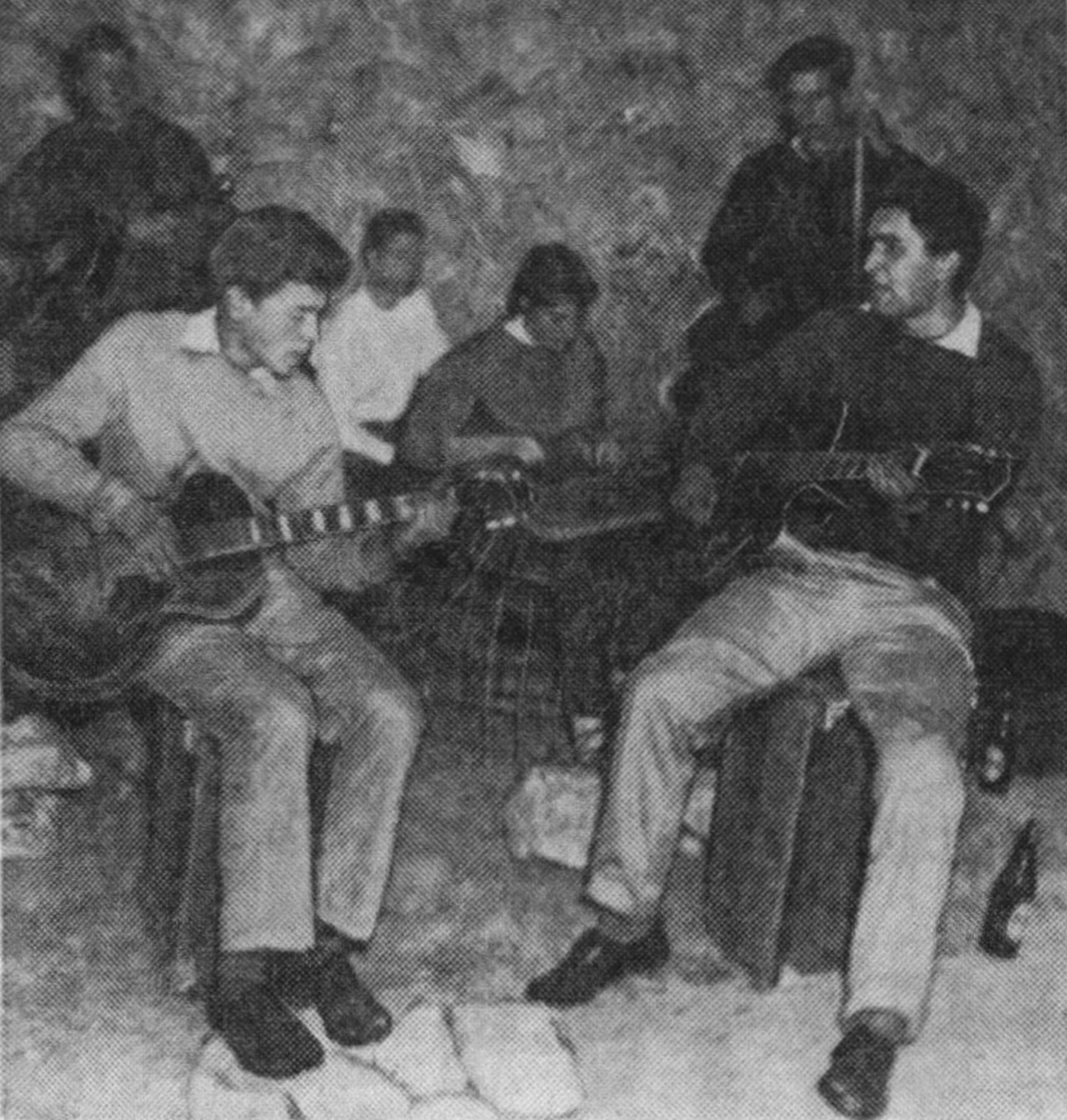
The Alcove Skiffle Group performing in the Chislehurst Caves in 1957

In the 1950s and 1960s, the caves were used as a skiffle and rock music venue.

From the mid 1950s to until the early 1960s, Lonnie Donegan played there along with other early British rockers such as Adam Faith, and Marty Wilde. Even American rockers such as Gene Vincent and Eddie Cochran played here during the early 1960s.

David Bowie was known to have performed there four times: June 1962, 17 November 1962, in 1964 and 4 March 1966.

Pink Floyd played there on 8 December 1967.

Jimi Hendrix played there twice: 16 December 1966 and 27 January 1967.

The Yardbirds played there on 1 July 1966.

Eric Burdon and The Animals performed there on 6 October 1967.

The Herd played there on 7 February 1968.

Other artists that have played there were the Shadows, Tommy Steele, Johnny Kidd and the Pirates, Status Quo, The Pretty Things. The Troggs and jazz acts including Acker Bilk, Humphrey Lyttelton and Kenny Ball.

Radio Caroline broadcast performances on a Saturday night with DJs such as Dave Lee Travis, Johnnie Walker, Tony Blackburn and Simon Dee, who would bring down music acts such as Muddy Waters.
