= Shell Grotto, Margate =

Underground structure decorated with seashells

Coordinates: 51°23′17″N 1°23′24″E

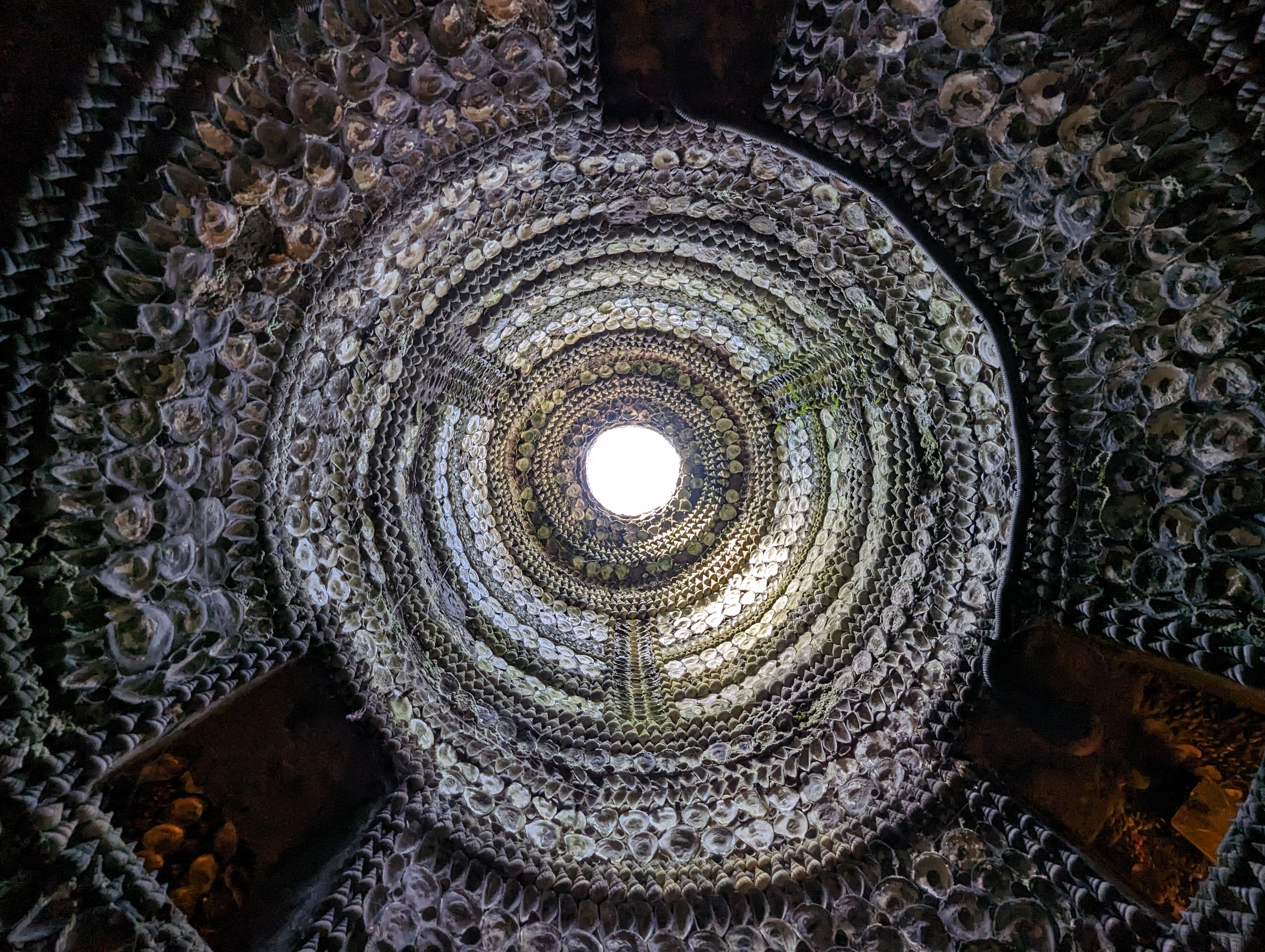
The dome inside the Shell Grotto

The Shell Grotto, sometimes called the Shell Temple, is an ornate underground shell grotto in the seaside town of Margate, Kent, England. The grotto, which has a passageway and main room, was dug out from chalk, a soft limestone common in the region. Almost all the surface area of the walls and roof is covered in mosaics created entirely of seashells, totalling about 2,000 square feet (190 m^{2}) of mosaic, with approximately 4.6 million shells. Its age, creators, and purpose are unknown, which has inspired a wide range of speculation, although several other shell grottos in England were made in the 18th century. This grotto was rediscovered in about 1835 and first opened to the public as a privately-owned tourist attraction in 1837. The grotto is a Grade I-listed building and remains open to the public. Attached to the grotto is a modern museum room, cafe, and gift shop.

== Structure and decoration ==
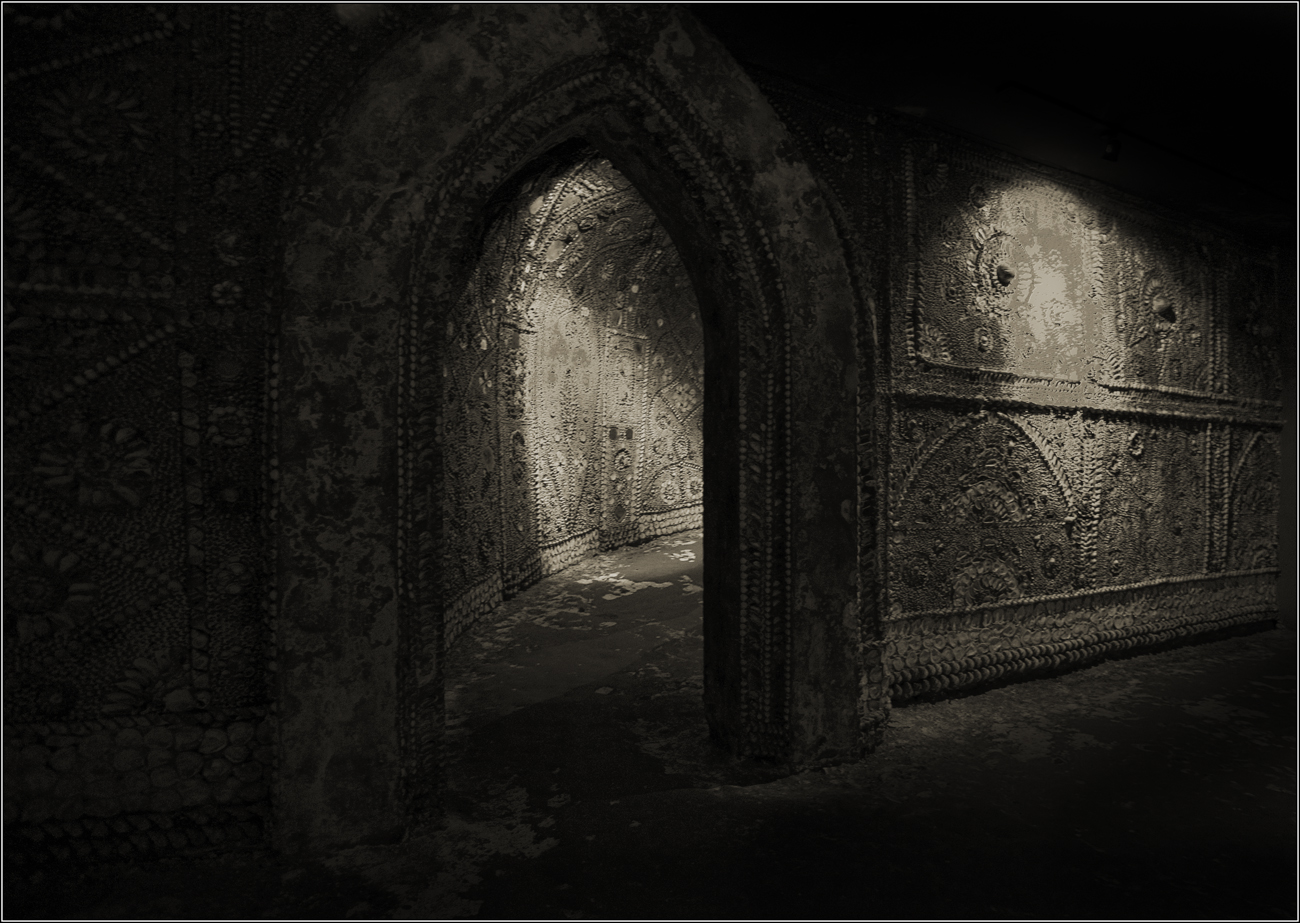
Inside the Shell Grotto

The Shell Grotto consists of a winding subterranean passageway, about 8 feet (2.4 m) high and 70 feet (21 m) in length, terminating in a rectangular room, referred to as the "altar chamber" and measuring approximately 15 by 20 ft (5 by 6 m).

The grotto is entirely underground. Steps at the upper end lead into a passage about 3 feet 6 inches (1.07 m) wide, roughly hewn out of the chalk, which winds down in serpentine fashion until it reaches an arch, the walls and roof of which here onward are covered in with shell mosaic. The arch leads to what is known as the "rotunda", a central circular column, meeting at the farther side at the dome – a shaft rising to the surface, capped to allow some daylight into the structure. The sub-base of the dome is triangular, equilateral, and with an arch in the centre of each side. The two arches in the sides are those leading from the rotunda, whilst the arch in the base leads into the "serpentine passage". This passage, with its curving walls and over-arching vaults, is rich in mosaics of varied design.

At the end of the serpentine passage, a further arch leads into the rectangular chamber. Here the decoration takes on a more formal and geometric character, but still finely drawn and executed. The subjects are chiefly star and sun shapes. The focal point, the "altar", is the curved niche, which faces the gothic-style entrance arch.

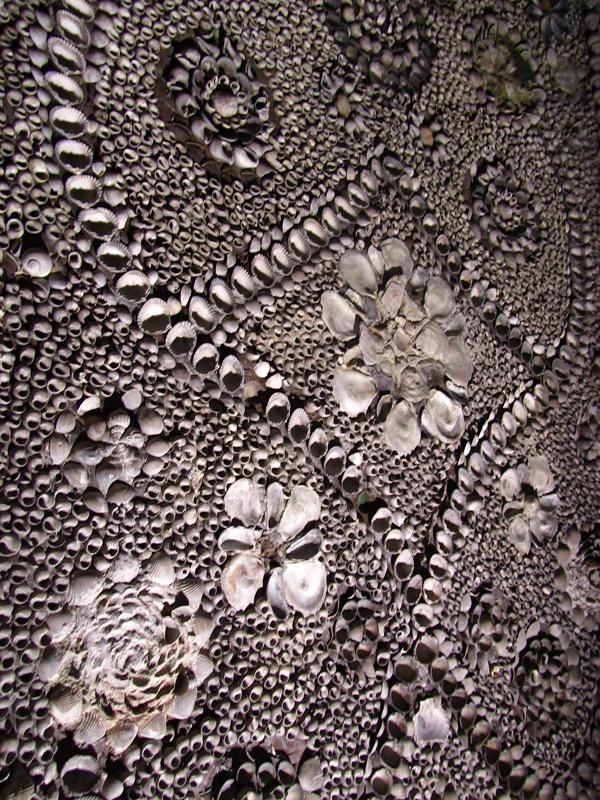
A detail of the shells

The most frequently used shells throughout the mosaic – mussels, cockles, whelks, limpets, scallops, and oysters – are largely local. They could have been found in sufficient numbers from four possible bays: Walpole Bay in Cliftonville; Pegwell Bay especially at Shellness Point, Cliffsend, near Richborough; Sandwich Bay, Sandwich; and Shellness on the Isle of Sheppey. The majority of the mosaic is formed from the flat winkle, which is used to create the background infill between the designs. However, this shell is found only rarely locally, so could have been collected from shores west of Southampton, where it is abundant.

== History ==
=== Origins ===
The origin and purpose of the structure are unknown. A member of the Kent Archaeological Society analyzed the grotto and concluded in 2006 that it was likely a mediaeval denehole, a small chalk mine, reworked and decorated in the 17th or 18th century. For example, that era of decoration would be contemporary with the shell grotto built around 1720 in Pope's villa in Twickenham. Historic England concluded that the decoration may have been created or added to in the early 19th century.

People have come up with a variety of speculations and hypotheses for the age and purpose of the grotto, such as: it was an 18th or 19th-century rich man's folly; it was connected with the Knights Templar or Freemasonry. In the late 1940s, a writer, who was also interested in the Baconian theory of Shakespeare authorship, published a book about his theory of Phoenician origins for the shell grotto. In 1952, a member of the Canadian Geographical Society said there were similarities between the shell decorations and Bronze Age art from the Minoan civilization.

=== Discovery ===
There are conflicting accounts of the grotto's discovery, although most agree on a date of 1835. The earliest reference to the discovery appears in an 1838 article in a predecessor of the Kentish Mercury:

Belle Vue cottage, a detached residence, has been lately been purchased by a gentleman, who, having occasion for some alterations, directed the workmen to excavate some few feet, during which operation the work was impeded a large stone, the gentleman being immediately called to the spot, directed a minute examination, which led to the discovery of an extensive grotto, completely studded with shells in curious devices, most elaborately worked up, extending an immense distance in serpentine walks, alcoves, and lanes, the whole forming one of the most curious and interesting sights that can possibly conceived, and must have been executed by torch light. We understand the proprietor intends shortly to open the whole for exhibition, at small charge for admission.

It has remained in private ownership ever since.

=== Tourist attraction and historic site ===
In 1932, a new owner took over the grotto, and soon afterwards substituted electric lighting for the gas lighting that, over the decades, had blackened the once-colourful shells. Cleaning trials show that in the majority of the grotto, the shells have lost their colour under the dirt and are white.

One of the walls was damaged by bombing during World War II and later reconstructed.

In 1973, the grotto was added to the National Heritage List for England as a Grade I listed building.

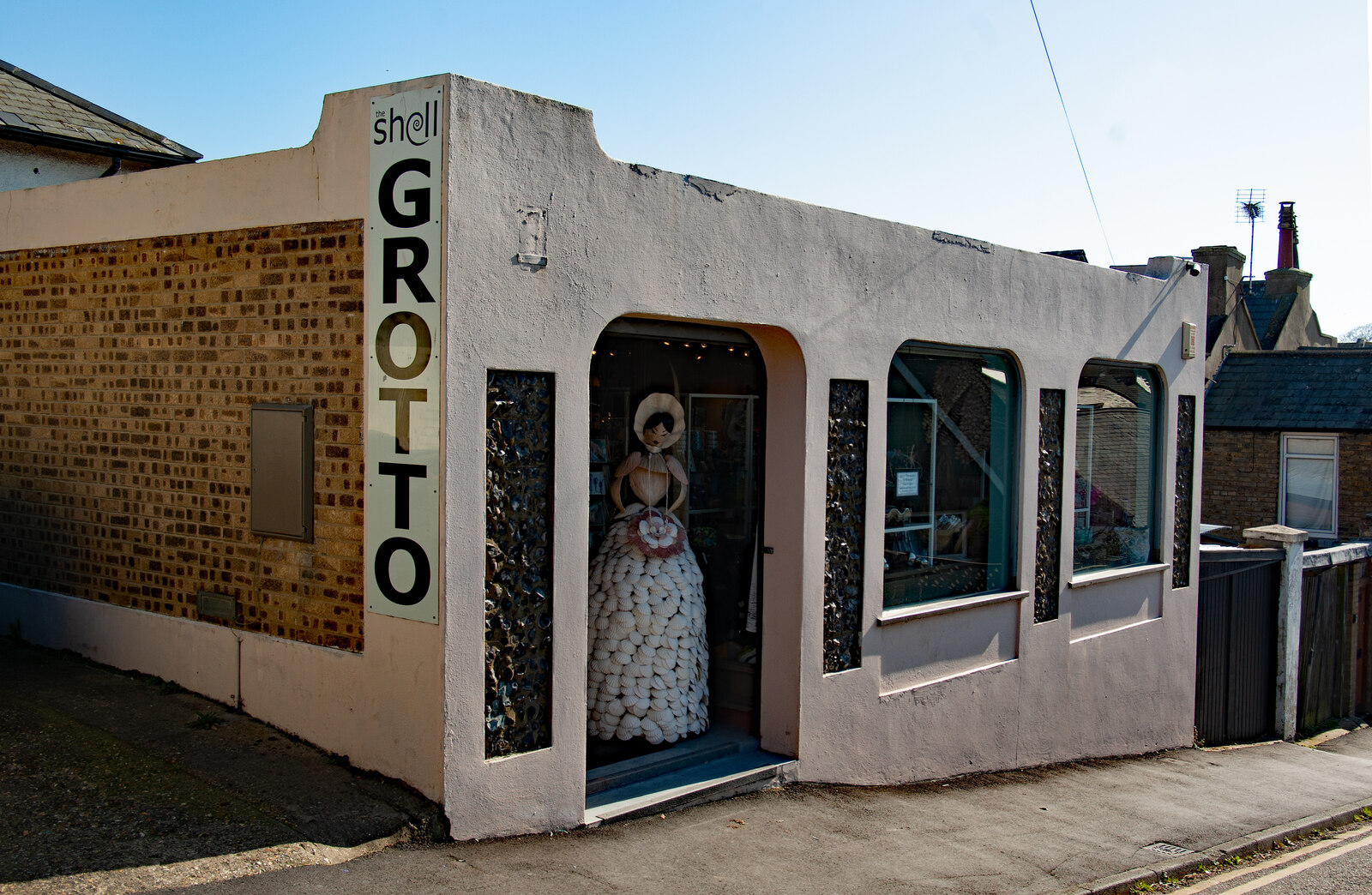
Museum room and souvenir shop

It was listed for sale in 1976. In 1981, new owners purchased the grotto and adjacent houses. In 1992, they said they averaged about 17,000 visitors during the tourist season between Easter and October, down from 30,000 in the early 1980s. They also operated the nearby Margate Caves attraction. In 1999, the grotto was put up for sale again.

The structure has suffered the effects of water penetration. By 1999, it needed significant reinforcement and drainage improvements.

The Friends of the Shell Grotto was formed in 2008 and is a not-for-profit trust established to promote, conserve, and preserve the grotto as a unique historical monument.

It was removed from the Heritage at Risk Register in 2012 after a five-year conservation programme, carried out in partnership with Historic England. A scheme to sponsor replacement mosaic panels, the Roundel Project, was established in 2012. The craftspeople who worked to restore the shell decorations were nominated for an English Heritage award in 2012. Additional restoration work was undertaken in 2025.

The owner has participated in initiatives to bring more tourism and economic activity to Margate. Other local tourist attractions include the Margate Museum and Crab Museum.

== Cultural depictions ==
Novels that feature the grotto include The Realm of Shells (2006), by Sonia Overall, and Elijah's Mermaid (2012), by Essie Fox. Rosa Rankin-Gee's 2021 novel Dreamland also contains a description of the shell grotto.

== Bibliography ==
- Barker, Nigel; Brodie, Allan; Dermott, Nick; Jessop, Lucy; Winter, Gary (2007). Margate's Seaside Heritage. Informed Conservation series. English Heritage. ISBN 978-1905624669.
- Bayley, Harold (1974). The Lost Language of Symbolism. Ernest Benn Ltd. ISBN 0-510-40801-X.
- Bridgewater, Howard (1957) [First published 1948]. The Grotto (3rd ed.). Keighley, Yorkshire, UK: Rydal Press / Kent Archaeological Society.
- Chaplin, Dorothea (1935). Matter, Myth, and Spirit. Rider & Co. ASIN B0000D5LFU. LCCN 77374723. OCLC 2366409. OL 4611002M.
- Cory, Harper (1949). The Goddess at Margate. Bedford, UK: Henry Burt & Son Ltd.
- Fanthorpe, Lionel; Fanthorpe, Patricia (1999). The World's Most Mysterious Places. Hounslow Press. ISBN 0-888-822-065.
- Haslam, Ruby (1974). The Shell Temple. Regency Press.
- Haslam, Ruby (2002). "The shell grotto at Margate". In Beamon, Sylvia (ed.). Underground Mythology. Able Publishing. ISBN 978-1-903607-20-6.
- Haslam, Ruby (2009). Reality and Imagery: The grottoes of Margate and Twickenham. Athena Press. ISBN 978-1-84748-349-2.
- Howard, Michael (1989). Earth Mysteries. Robert Hale. ISBN 0-709-039-336.
- Jackson, Hazelle (2001). Shell Houses and Grottoes. Shire Publications. ISBN 0-7478-0522-9.
- Jones, Barbara (1974) [1953]. Follies and Grottoes (rev. 2nd ed.). Constable. ASIN B0000CINFP.
- le Gear, Rod (2012). Underground Thanet. Trust for Thanet Archaeology.
- Marsh, Patricia Jane (2020) [2011, 2015]. The Enigma of the Margate Shell Grotto, An examination of the theories on its origins (rev. 3rd ed.). Martyrs Field Publications. ISBN 978-0-9569437-2-9 (2020); ISBN 978-0-9569437-1-2 (2015); ISBN 978-0-9569437-0-5 (2011).
- Mitchell, C.A. (c. 1949). The Grotto: A study of one of the first great civilizations. Margate, UK: Cooper the Printer Ltd.
- Pennick, Nigel (1981). The Subterranean Kingdom. Turnstone. ISBN 0-855-001-402.
- Shaw, Conan; Shaw, Nellie I. (1954). The Shell Temple of Margate: An archaic masterpiece. Margate, UK: Cooper the Printer.
- Vennemann, Theo (Spring 2017). "The shell grottoes of Thanet and Rome: Carthaginian sanctuaries?". Interdisciplinary Journal for Germanic Linguistics and Semiotic Analysis. 22 (1). International and Area Studies, University of California, Berkeley: 69–110.
