= Crab Museum =

Museum in Margate, Kent, England

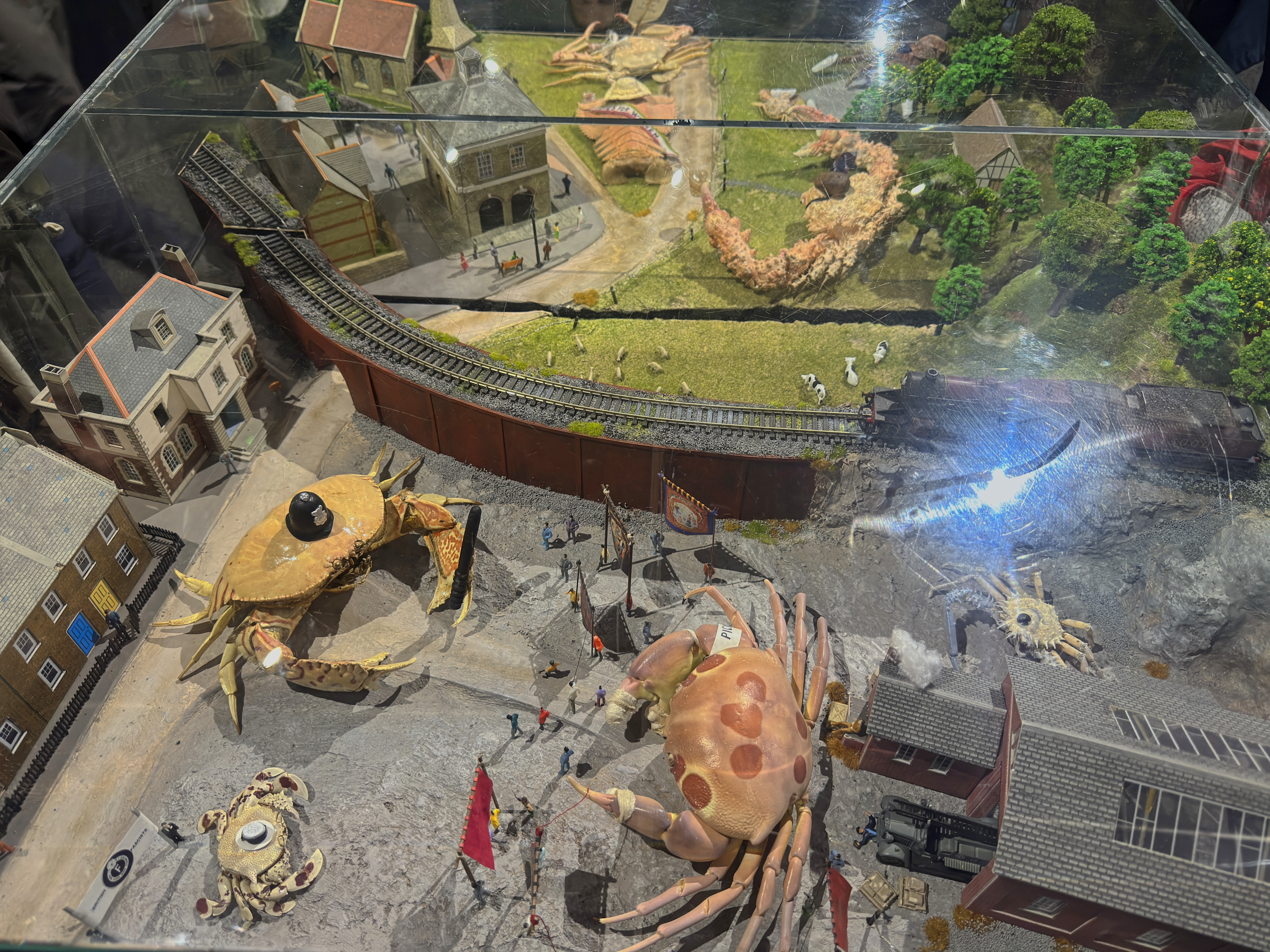
- Part of an exhibit at the museum
- Established: 2021
- Location: Broad Street, Margate, Kent
- Directors: Bertie Suesat-Williams; Ned Suesat-Williams; Chase Coley
- Website: www.crabmuseum.org

The Crab Museum is a small idiosyncratic museum in Margate, Kent, England. Billed as "Europe’s first and only museum dedicated to the decapod", it was founded in 2021 by Chase Coley, Bertie Suesat-Williams, and Ned Suesat-Williams.

It is located in the upstairs floor of the Pie Factory building on Broad Street in Margate Old Town. The lower floor operates as Pie Factory Gallery.

== Overview ==
None of the Crab Museum's founders had any crab or museum backgrounds, and they opened without a collection of artefacts. They reported that they could have dedicated the museum to slugs or worms, and considered a museum of hexagons at one point. They ultimately landed on crabs because of the "many directions that a crab can take you. You can use crabs to talk about everything from global politics to fidget spinners".

The museum is free to enter. It is funded with merchandise sales from the gift shop and crowdfunding, with initial funds from a loan. Visitors increased from about 20,000 in 2022 to about 80,000 in 2023. It is set to undergo expansion in 2025 with a new roof garden. The Crab Museum were given a 150-million-year-old fossil of a shrimp as its first artefact. In 2023, the founders said they were taking courses on preservation, in part to enable streams of government funding.

== Exhibits and approach ==
Partly intended as a nod to Margate's "eccentric" attractions, the Crab Museum employs "science, humour and philosophy", to present crab information in the broader context of natural history and complex ecosystems. Absurdist displays and irreverent cartoon drawings were created by artist Ed Stockham.

"The pompom crab has worked out that if they lose one of their sea anemones in a fight, they can rip the other one in half, and it will regrow into two. So this animal that has effectively no brain has worked out tool use and propagation, or what we humans would refer to as cloning."
However, "... few people consider crabs intelligent in a traditional sense".
– Bertie Suesat-Williams

An article in The Guardian called the Crab Museum "very funny". One diorama shows three different species of crab by presenting the crabs in period costumes, as if participating in the 1926 general strike. A sign explains that the species live in different parts of the world and do not interact, so "it would be misleading to depict them in a realistic natural setting."

The founders hope the Crab Museum changes the museum sector, with Bertie holding up their model as more enjoyable and far less dependent on the fossil fuel industry. "It’s more interdisciplinary. It’s more fun to go to. It’s more engaging."

== Events ==
The Crab Museum collaborated with Butterfly Conservation on the 2023 Conservation Fest.

In April 2024, the Crab Museum held a "World's Funniest Crab Joke" competition judged by children, the founders, and comedians including Rose Matafeo, Phil Wang, Harry Hill and Sally Phillips. Submissions had to be PG, and could not feature lobsters in the punchline ("pinchline" in the official guidelines). The winning submission was as follows: "A man walks into a restaurant with a crab under his arm and says, 'Do you make crab cakes?' The manager answers, 'Yes, we do.' 'Good,' says the man, 'because it’s his birthday.'"

During Pride 2024, the Crab Museum hosted a temporary exhibition in partnership with the Vagina Museum. Later that year, Robin Ince put on a show at the Crab Museum titled The Universe and the Neurodiverse: Stories from Outer and Inner Space.

The trio of co-founders created a non-fiction children's book about the evolution of bums, published in 2025 by Quarto.

== Reception ==
The Crab Museum won a 2023 Digital Culture Award for its "radical and unhinged" social media presence, awarded by Arts Council England. "They saw over 26,000 visitors in 2022, are now the highest rated tourist attraction in Margate, and their international renown has seen them invited as keynote speakers to Crabcon 2023."

A staff member of London's Natural History Museum told The New York Times that the Crab Museum "teaches more in a small space and short time than many others with far larger budgets".

== See also ==
- Margate Caves
- Shell Grotto, Margate
