= National Student Pride =

Former annual British LGBTQ student event

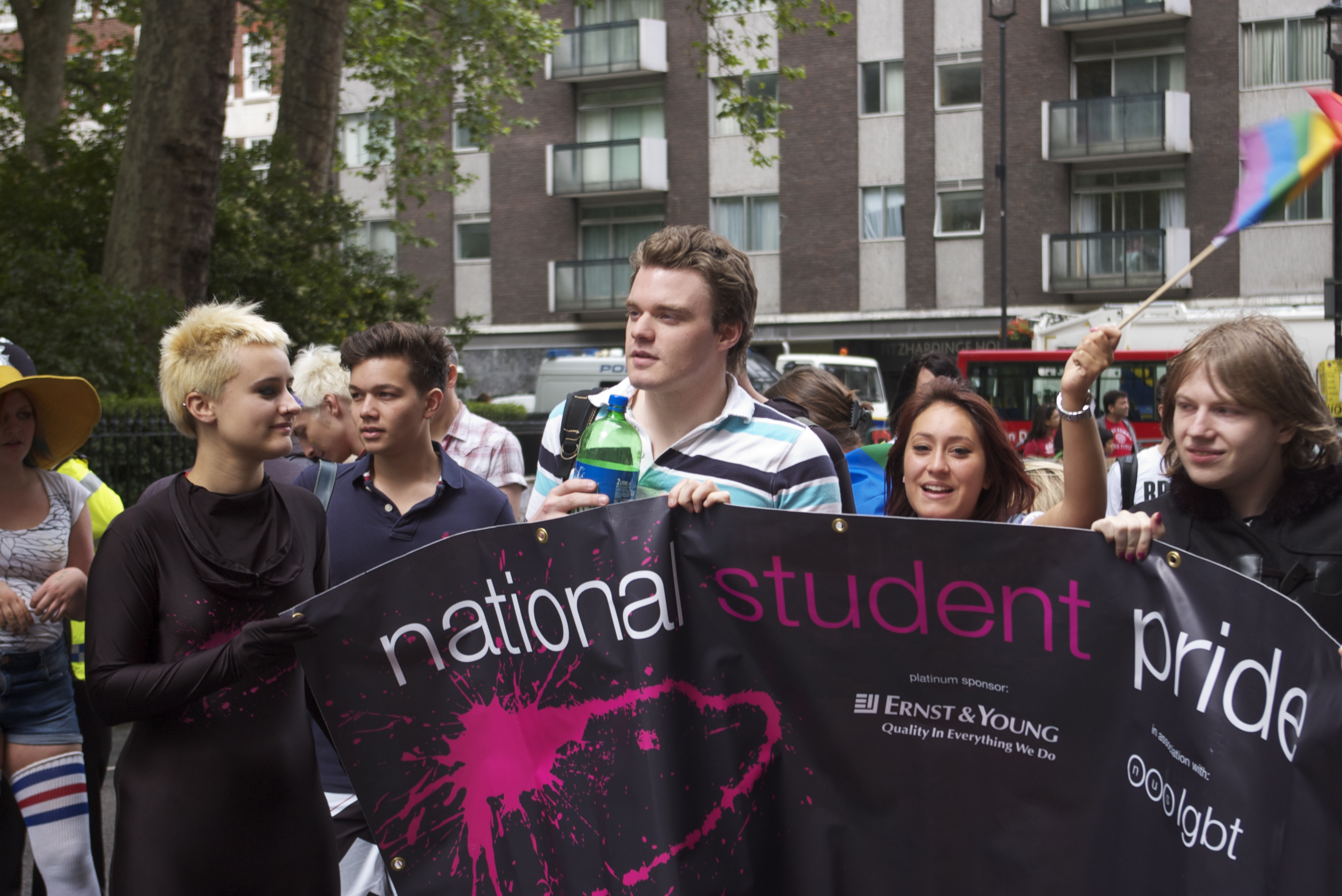
- National Student Pride marching at WorldPride London 2012
- Status: Ended
- Country: United Kingdom
- Years active: 2005–2026
- Founder: Tom Guy
- Website: studentpride.co.uk

National Student Pride, often referred to as Student Pride, was the largest LGBTQ student event in the United Kingdom. Established in 2005 in response to a talk by a trainee vicar hosted by the Christian union at Oxford Brookes University, the event became largely focused around what in 2020 was the UK's largest diversity careers fair, through which it gained most of its funding. It also featured talks and panel discussions as well as launch parties and after-parties. It continued until 2026 when it ended due to a lack of corporate funding.

== History ==
=== 2005–09: Founding and first events ===
National Student Pride was founded in 2005, looking to give LGBTQ students in the UK visibility, community, and access to inclusive employers. Founders included Tom Guy, who has stated that the organisation was founded "in direct response to a homophobic and deeply divisive talk given by a trainee vicar at Oxford Brookes University," hosted by the university's Christian union. Its first event was centred on a panel discussion which featured both a vicar and a rabbi.

=== 2010–19 ===
Over 1,500 students attended National Student Pride 2012, after which musician Elton John and filmmaker David Furnish were announced as ambassadors for the event. The 2013 event took place in Brighton from 1–3 March. Debate panellists included actor Charlie Condou, BBC presenter Evan Davis, Channel 4 News culture editor Matthew Cain, and former England rugby union player Ben Cohen. The X Factor star Lucy Spraggan was expected to perform.

The 2015 National Student Pride event, in its second year at the University of Westminster, was expected to be attended by hundreds of students coming from up to 130 different universities. Scheduled speakers included BBC presenter Evan Davis, transgender comedian Bethany Black, and journalist Owen Jones. A talk by Haitham al-Haddad, who had previously described homosexuality as "a scourge" and "a criminal act" was scheduled a day prior to the event, and the university's LGBTI society responded to the invitation by launching a petition to block the visit which gained nearly 2,500 signatures by 23 February. National Student Pride's spokesperson responded that the decision to invite him was "disappointing," that "Homosexuality is not a scourge," and that they were going ahead with the event. Al-Haddad's talk was later postponed.

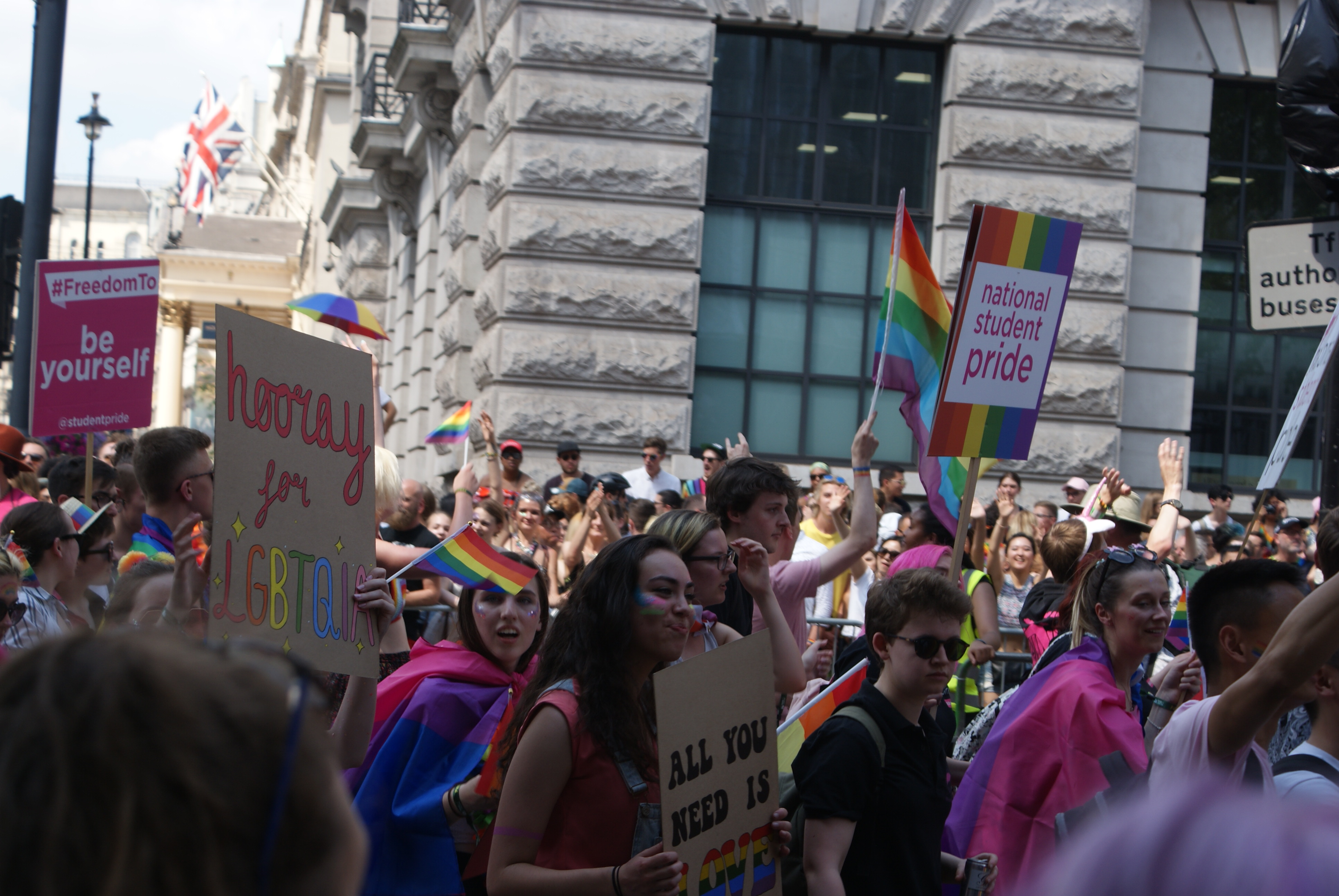
National Student Pride at Pride in London 2018

In 2019, the London nightclub Heaven hosted National Student Pride's after-party.

=== 2020–25 ===
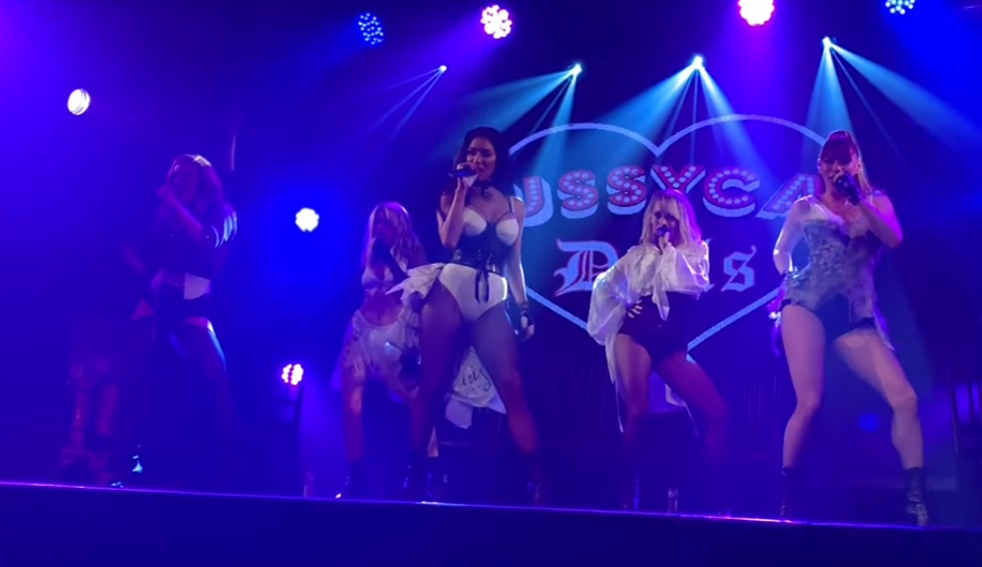
The Pussycat Dolls performing at National Student Pride at the nightclub Heaven in 2020

The opening party of National Student Pride 2020, from 21 to 23 February, was held at the nightclub G-A-Y Late. Corporate attendees, at the University of Westminster's Marylebone Campus, included Clifford Chance, Enterprise Rent-A-Car, Lloyds Banking Group, Santander, and ASOS. Evan Davis interviewed Sir Ian McKellen on stage at the event for the QueerAF podcast. A sexual health panel featured clinician Ranj Singh, trans activist Charlie Craggs, and Vagina Museum founder Florence Schechter. Heaven, then known as G-A-Y Heaven, again hosted the event's after-party, which was scheduled to feature the Pussycat Dolls. The final event that year was 'Draglympics', a brunch hosted by drag performers Tia Kofi and Dolly Trolley at the Marylbone Campus.

National Student Pride 2021 was a fully digital event, taking place from 19 to 25 April. It had a focus on four issues which were mental health, women, transgender education and Black Lives Matter. Events included an interview with Stephen Fry, a show hosted by Nick Grimshaw, Munroe Bergdorf, as well as an online quiz with Lorraine Kelly, Lawrence Chaney, Suzi Ruffell, Charlie Craggs, and Tia Kofi.

53 companies were willing to sign up to the careers fair for the 2023 event.

National Student Pride 2024, from 23 to 25 February, was expected to host over 2,000 attendees, and had 24 sponsors. On 23 February, drag queen Crystal and author Juno Dawson hosted the launch party which included the National Student Pride Awards. A panel discussion on LGBTQ people in television and film, hosted by magazine Attitude's editor Cliff Joannou, was scheduled to feature writer Russell T Davies, and actors Bel Priestley, Nathaniel Curtis, Noel Thomas and Jack Wolfe. A 'Queer Question Time' panel involving politicians from each major British party, chaired by Natasha Devon, was also scheduled. There would also be a 'Researching the Rainbow' panel featuring LGBTQ academics and researchers.

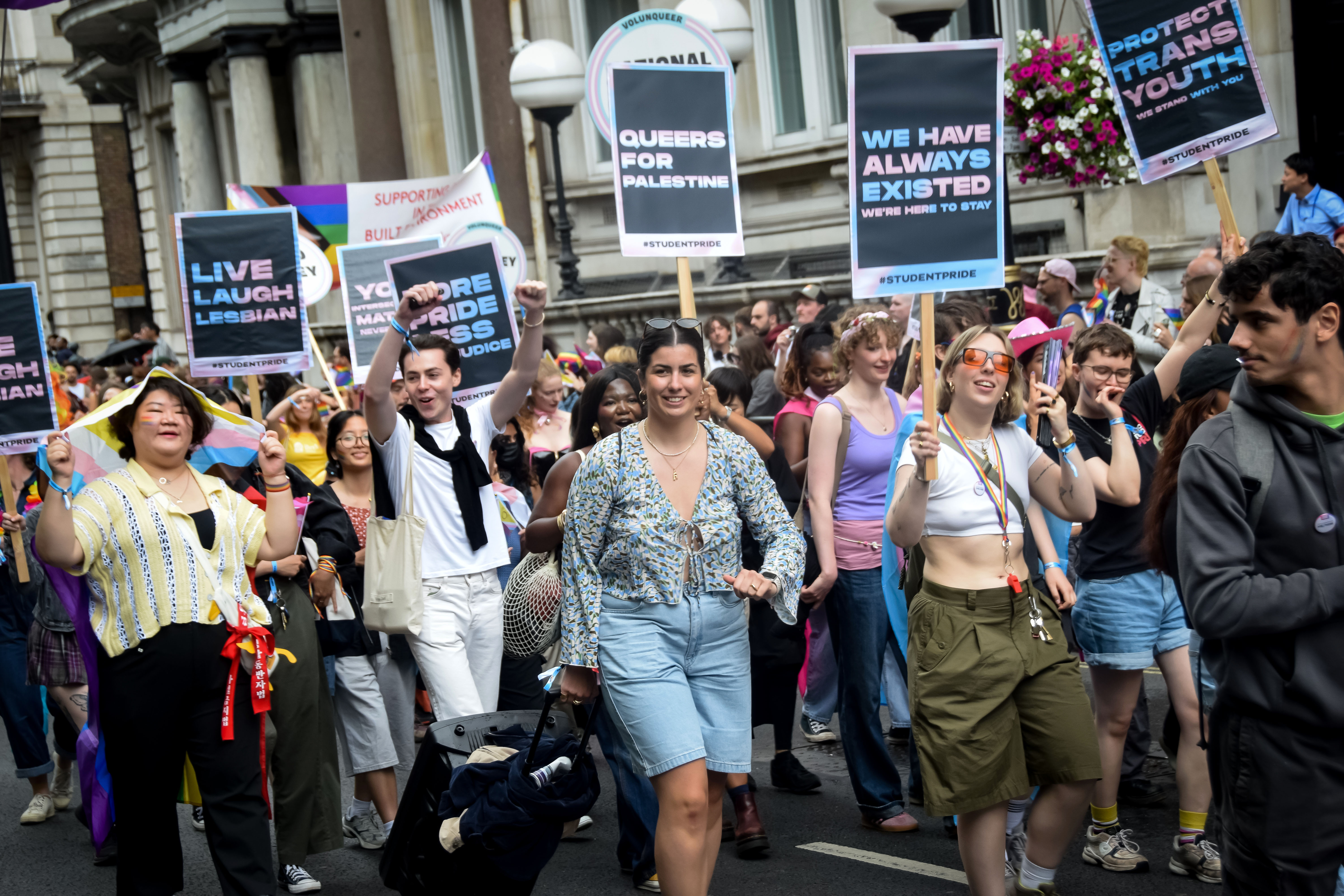
National Student Pride at Pride in London 2025

In 2025, after some LGBTQ groups protested against National Student Pride due to some of its sponsors' links to the fossil fuel industry and Israel, the organisation introduced an ethical sponsorship policy.

=== 2026: Final event ===
On 11 February 2026, NSP announced that its 2026 festival on 13–14 February would be its last, which it attributed to a "sustained" decrease in corporate funding due to widespread cuts to diversity, equity and inclusion budgets and thus reduced attendance of these companies at its careers fair; the organisation's income had decreased by about two thirds over two years, to eight sponsors. Tom Guy additionally noted that fewer companies were also willing to attend the careers fair, at a total of 20 that year. Organisers have stated that they hoped the event would return in the future with a new form and new team. The 2026 event itself was scheduled to end with a "Dragstravaganza finale" featuring guests Amanda and Jessie from The Traitors.
