= Denehole =

Type of chalk cave in England

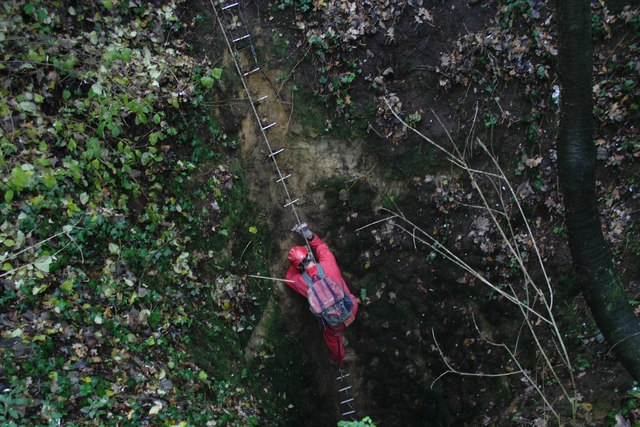
Descending into a denehole in Essex

A denehole (alternatively dene hole or dene-hole) is an underground structure consisting of a number of small chalk caves entered by a vertical shaft. The name is given to certain caves or excavations in England, which have been popularly supposed to have been created by the Danes or some other of the early northern invaders of the country. The common spelling Dane hole is adduced as evidence of this, and individual names, such as Vortigern's Caves at Margate, and Canute's Gold Mine near Bexley, naturally follow the same theory. The word, however, is probably derived from the Anglo Saxon den, a hole or valley. The lack of evidence found in them has led to long arguments as to their function.

== Form ==
The general outline of the formation of these caves is invariably the same. The entrance is a vertical shaft some 3 feet (1 m) in diameter falling, on an average, to a depth of 60 feet (20 m). The depth is regulated by the depth of the chalk layer from the surface, although chalk can be found within a few feet, or even inches, from the surface. A depth of from 45 to 80 feet (14 to 24 m) or more is a characteristic feature.

Footholds were cut into the sides of the shaft to allow people to climb in and out. The shaft, when the chalk is reached, widens out into a domed chamber with a roof of chalk some 3 feet thick. The walls frequently contract somewhat as they near the floor. As a rule the main chamber is 16 to 18 feet in height, beneath each shaft. From this excessive height it has been inferred that the caves were not primarily intended for habitations or even hiding-places. In most cases, between two and four sub-chambers are present, excavated laterally from the floor level, the roof being supported by pillars of chalk left standing.

== Distribution ==
There are many underground excavations in the south of England, also found to some extent in the Midlands and the north, but true deneholes are found chiefly in those parts of Kent and Essex along the lower banks of the Thames. With one exception there are no recorded specimens farther east than those of the Grays Thurrock district, situated in Hangman's Wood, on the north, and one near Challock on the south side of the river south of Faversham. Isolated specimens have been discovered in various parts of Kent and Essex, but the most important groups have been found at Grays Thurrock, in the districts of Woolwich, Abbey Wood and Bexley, and at Gravesend. Those at Bexley and Grays Thurrock are the most valuable still existing. It is generally found that the tool work on the roof or ceiling is rougher than that on the walls, where an upright position could be maintained.

== History ==
Pliny the Elder wrote about British chalk extraction in AD 70, and archaeological evidence shows that at least some of the deneholes were being exploited during prehistory. Casts taken of some of the pick-holes near the roof show that, in all probability, they were made by bone or horn picks. Numerous bone picks have been discovered in Essex and Kent. These pick-holes are amongst the most valuable data for the study of deneholes, and have assisted in fixing the date of their formation to pre-Roman times. However, very few artifacts which would provide dating evidence or assisted in determining the uses of these prehistoric excavations have been discovered in any of the known deneholes. Chrétien de Troyes has a passage on caves in Britain which may have reference to deneholes, and tradition of the 14th century treated the deneholes of Grays as the fabled gold mines of Cunobeline (or Cymbeline) of the 1st century.

In 1225 Henry III gave every man the right to sink a marl pit on his own land. Spreading chalk on the fields was a common practice in the Middle Ages. This appears to have continued into the 19th century. The need for chalk in agriculture supports the theory that the origin of deneholes was for chalk extraction.

Vortigern's Caves at Margate are possibly deneholes which have been adapted later for other purposes; and excellent examples of various pick-holes may be seen on different parts of the walls. The Shell Grotto in Margate may also have been adapted from a denehole.

Local tradition in some cases suggests the use of these caves by smugglers. Illicit traffic was common not only on the coast but in the Thames as far up the river as Barking Creek. The theory is at least plausible that these ready-made hiding-places, which were difficult of approach and dangerous to descend, were used in this way.

== Purpose ==
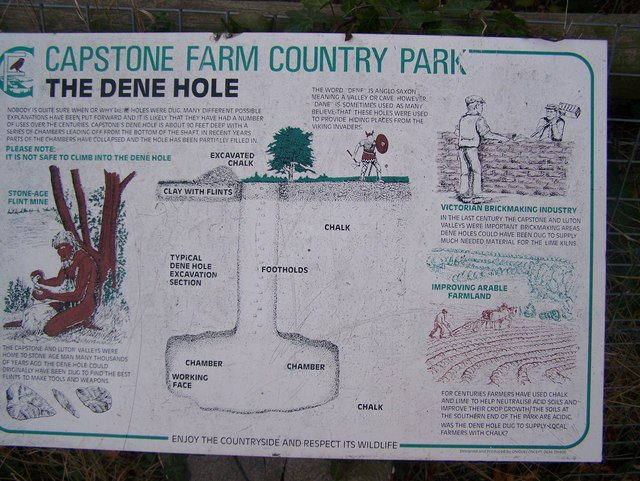
Information sign about the Dene Hole in Capstone Farm Country Park

By the end of the nineteenth century, three purposes had been suggested for which deneholes may have been originally excavated:

- as hiding-places or dwellings,
- as storehouses for grain, or
- as draw-wells for the extraction of chalk for agricultural uses.

For several reasons it is unlikely that they were used as habitations, although they may have been used occasionally as hiding places. Silos, or underground storehouses, are well-known in southern Europe and in Morocco. It has been suggested that grain was stored unthreshed and carefully protected from damp by straw. A curious smoothness of the roof of one of the chambers of the Gravesend twin-chamber denehole has been put forward as additional evidence in support of this theory.

Since the 1950s the theory that they were ancient chalk mines has gained acceptance. This was formerly thought unlikely, as it was reasoned that chalk could have been obtained outcropping close by. J.E.L. Caiger worked in Kent excavating, surveying and researching deneholes, and concluded that they were excavated in prehistoric, Roman, medieval and even post-medieval times in order to produce a supply of unpolluted chalk to spread on fields for the purposes of marling. By excavating a narrow shaft the miners used up as little of the productive agricultural land as possible. He suggested various other practical matters that supported his ideas, including the facts that opencast chalk extraction would require moving the material further than necessary and that shallower chalk deposits have much of their minor mineral content leached out by groundwater.
