= Margate Caves =

Tourist attraction in Kent, England

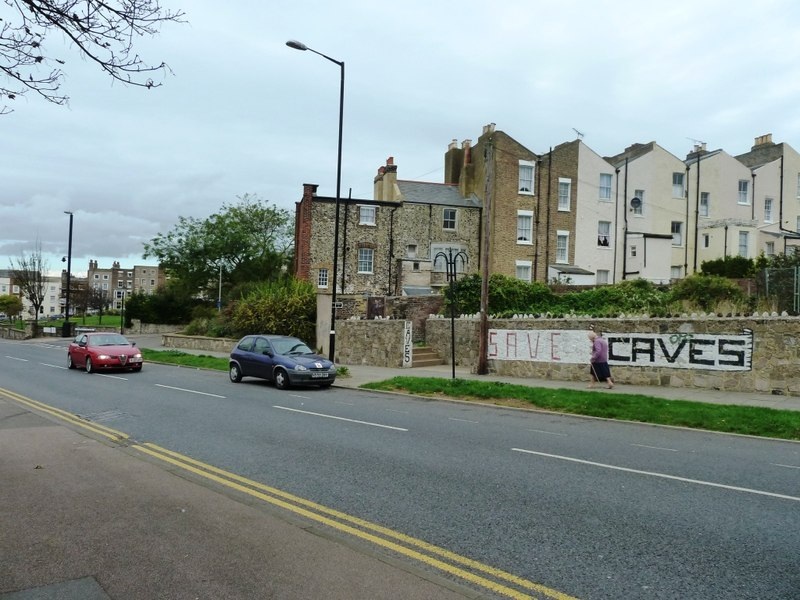
- The site of the caves in 2014.
- Coordinates: 51.390190°N 1.386665°E
- Website: www.margatecaves.co.uk

The Margate Caves are a tourist attraction in Margate. The caves were originally dug as a chalk mine in the area between Margate and Cliftonville. The caves were opened as Victorian seaside attraction in 1863 under the fictional name The Vortigern Caves. Their walls were decorated with gaudy murals (of soldiers and pirates). The cave's popularity continued into the 20th century but were closed in 2004.

After a local campaign starting in 2011 the caves were once again opened to visitors in 2019, with a newly built centre with a cafe, shop and exhibition space.

== See also ==
- Shell Grotto, Margate
