= Florence Schechter =

Founder of Vagina Museum

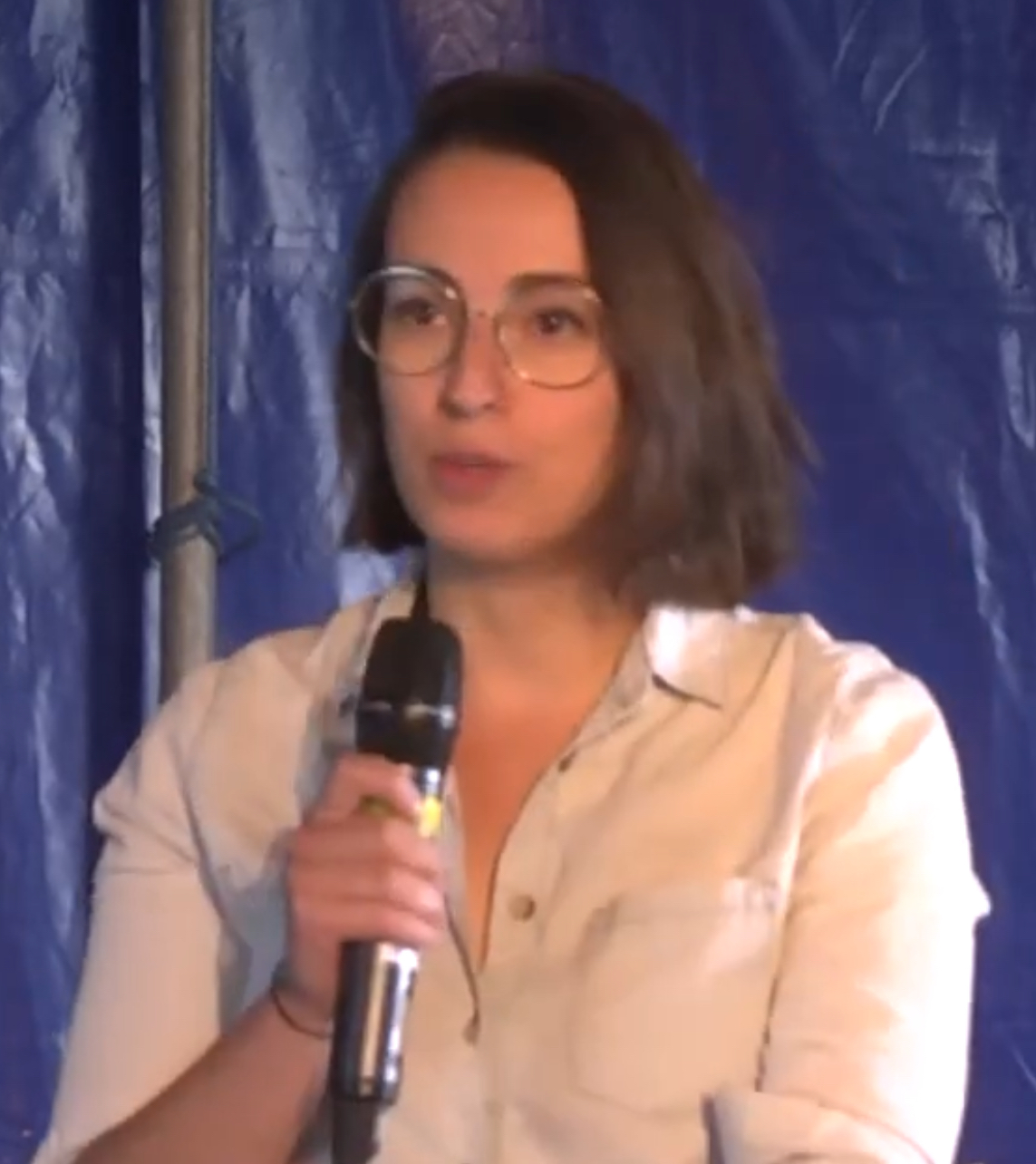
- Schechter in 2018

Hackney London Borough Councillor for Brownswood
- Incumbent
- Assumed office 8 May 2026
- Preceded by: Clare Potter
- Majority: 218

Personal details
- Party: Green
- Education: University of Birmingham (BSc)
- Occupation: Museum Director, Author, Public Speaker
- Website: www.floschechter.com

Florence Schechter is a British activist and politician, who is also the founder of the Vagina Museum and was director from 2017 to 2024. She has served as a Green Party councillor for Brownswood ward in Hackney Council since May 2026. She is also cabinet member for Finance, Resident Services and Digital.

She is also a consultant, science communicator, and public speaker. Her debut book, V: An Empowering Celebration of the Vulva and Vagina, was published by Penguin Random House in March 2023.

== Early life and education ==
Schechter's father is Klezmer musician Grigori Schechter. She graduated from the University of Birmingham in 2014 with a BSc in Biochemistry.

Prior to the Vagina Museum, she interned at the BBC show QI.

== Vagina Museum ==
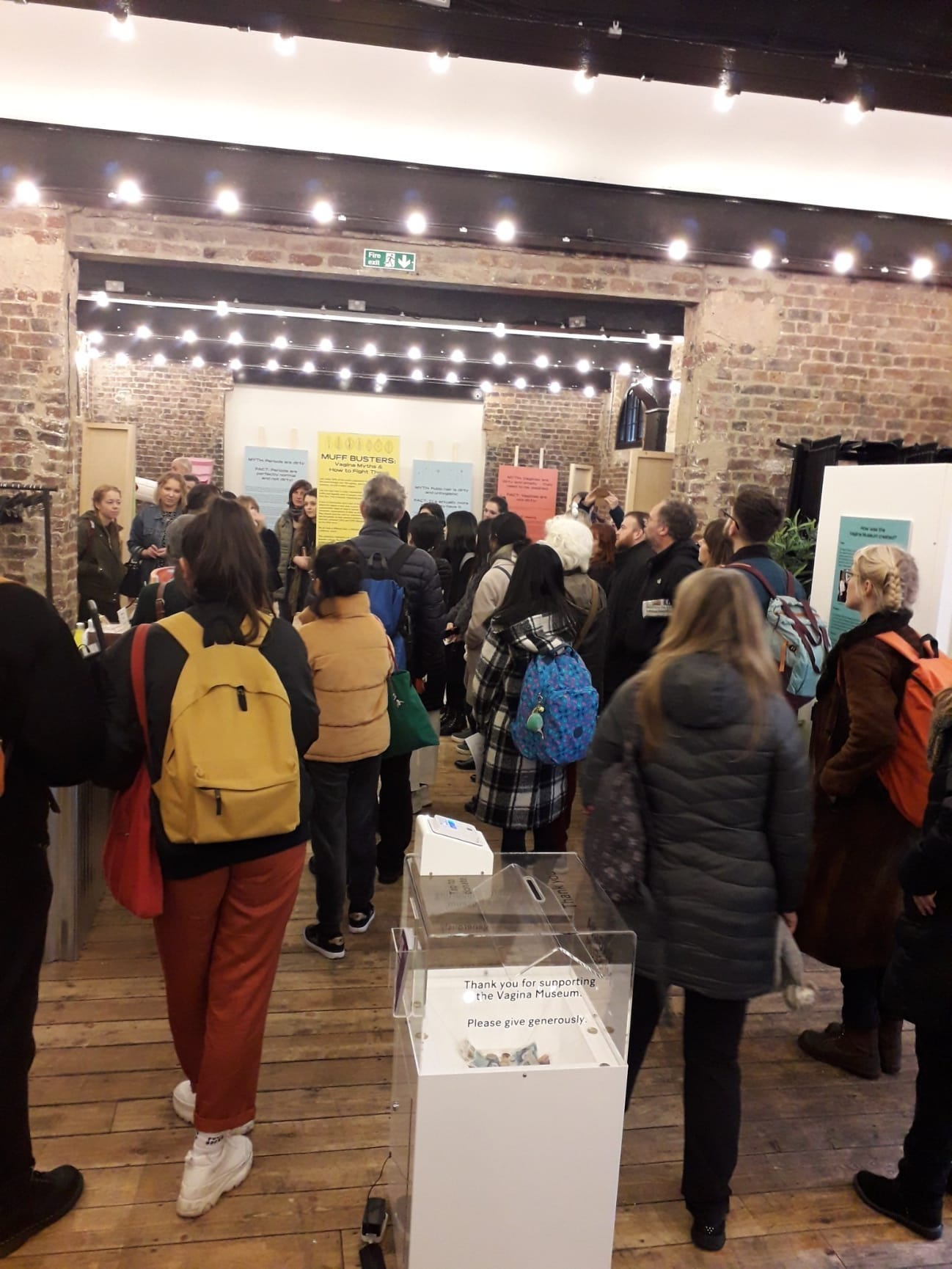
Visitors at the Vagina Museum exhibition Muff Busters - Vagina Myths and How to Fight Them

In 2017, Schechter founded the Vagina Museum after discovering that there was a penis museum in Iceland, but no vagina equivalent anywhere in the world. She was the Vagina Museum's Director from 2017 to 2024. The first ever fundraising event was held at Unit 5 Gallery, London in May 2017. The first pop up exhibition was held in August 2017 at the Edinburgh Fringe Festival. The following year, it toured an exhibition around the UK called Is Your Vagina Normal?.

The Vagina Museum opened its first semi-permanent location in Camden Market with the inaugural exhibition Muff Busters: Vagina Myths and How to Fight Them, opening on 16 November 2019. To open the museum, a fundraising campaign was held which raised almost £50,000. In 2021, the Vagina Museum closed its doors in Camden Market after the landlords refused to renew the lease in their unit. The Vagina Museum reopened in its second location in March 2022 in ENTER, a venue located in Bethnal Green. The museum then opened in its long-term location in two railway arches in Bethnal Green after a crowdfunding campaign that raised over £85,000.

The museum is dedicated to being trans-inclusive.

Schechter has lectured around the world about her work with the Vagina Museum, including the Royal Institution, British Science Festival, Conway Hall, Freud Museum, and National Student Pride.

== Politics ==
In the 2026 Hackney London Borough Council election, Schechter was elected as councillor for Brownswood ward with 1,370 votes. Turnout was 45.01%, and the two Green party candidates, Schechter and Councillor Soraya Adejare, received 51.56% of the votes.

The following Monday, it was announced that newly elected Mayor Zoë Garbett had selected Schechter to serve as cabinet member for finance, resident services and digital. Her portfolio includes budget and financial strategy, capital programme, digital, customer services, democracy, legal, citizens assemblies, HR, trade union relations, performance and risk.

Schechter sits on the Cabinet Procurement and Insourcing Committee, Pensions Committee and Standards Committee. She also sits on the board of the North London Waste Authority.

In 2026, Schechter faced controversy following an Instagram post in which she invited people “inspired by the protests in France” to join an anti-austerity protest organised in London. She then did an interview with LBC to clarify she was referring to the peaceful protesters.

== Writing ==
On 11 October 2022, it was announced that Penguin would be publishing Schechter's debut book V: An Empowering Celebration of the Vulva and Vagina. The book was published in March 2023 and is illustrated by Nadia Akingbule. The book is suitable for ages 14+. As part of the marketing campaign, she went on tour to Cheltenham Science Festival, Surgeons' Hall Museum, Burgh House, and Conway Hall.

Schechter is currently signed with United Agents.

She has also written articles for a number of publications including DIVA magazine, Metro, and The Huffington Post.

In 2024, she published a guide for the museums sector called "So You Want to Build a Museum".

== Public speaking ==
Schechter has been working in the science communication sector since 2016, mostly based around biology. She has written and presented a number of podcasts for Chemistry World, podcast of the Royal Society of Chemistry, and for the BBC's Boring Talks.

In 2019, Schechter performed her debut show "Queer by Nature" at Vaults Festival, all about same sex sexual behaviour in animals.

She has spoken at and contributed to a number of different conferences and festivals including Green Man Festival, Imperial College London, and Bradford Literature Festival. She gave the keynote speech at SCI:COM 2022 at Dublin's Aviva Stadium and British Science Festival 2024.

Schechter has appeared in a number of podcasts including The Guilty Feminist, Doing It with Hannah Witton, Drunk Women Solving Crime, and Arts & Culture.

She was a contributor to the Peacock documentary Queer Planet, which premiered in 2024.

== Honours and awards ==
Schechter came highly commended in the Women of the Future Awards in 2017.

In 2019, she won Pioneer of the Year in the Sexual Freedom Awards.

In 2020, she was nominated for the Rising Star of the Year Award with DIVA magazine.

In 2023, she came highly commended in the Young Entrepreneur Category at the DIVA awards.

== Personal life ==
Schechter is bisexual.
