= Palm Bay, Kent =

Area of Margate, Kent, England

Coordinates: 51.3927°N 1.4125°E

Palm Bay
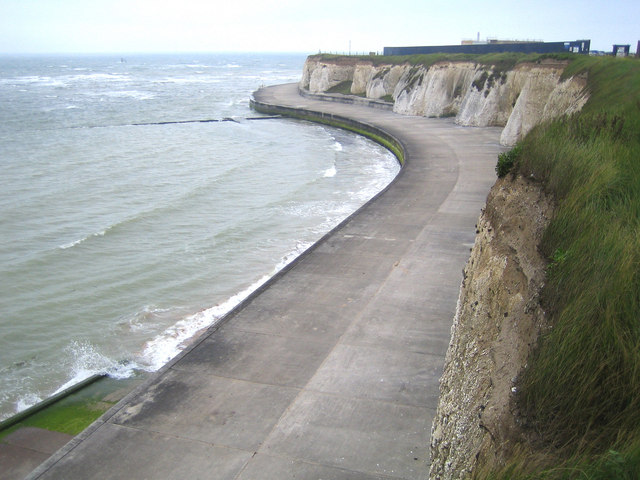
- Palm Bay

- Location within Kent
- OS grid reference: TR321701
- District: Thanet
- Shire county: Kent
- Region: South East
- Country: England
- Sovereign state: United Kingdom
- Post town: Margate
- Postcode district: CT9
- Dialling code: 01843
- Police: Kent
- Fire: Kent
- Ambulance: South East Coast
- UK Parliament: East Thanet

Palm Bay is an area of Cliftonville, a suburb of Margate in Kent, England.

The area is predominantly housing, but also has recreational land for the general public. Palm Bay is one of many bays round the coast of Thanet. It lies between Walpole and Botany Bays and is popular as a centre for Jet Skiing, the eastern end of Palm Bay is also known as Forness Bay and is the home to a local water skiing club.

The original Palm Bay estate was built in the 1930s as a number of large, wide avenues with detached and semi-detached houses with driveways, garages and gardens. This land was sold by Mr Sidney Simon Van Den Bergh to the Palm Bay Estate Co on 23 June 1924. Such avenues include Gloucester Avenue and Leicester Avenue.

The estate covers the eastern part of Cliftonville and was fields when the first was built. It extends east beyond Northumberland Avenue and has been developed in phases. An earlier phase covered the northern ends of Leicester and Gloucester Avenues and the whole of Clarence and Magnolia Avenues; the later phase extending eastwards of Princess Margaret Avenue is a Wimpy style housing estate with small houses largely identical in appearance and of less substantial build quality than the original 1930s estate.

This is also the location of the Kent Airshow, first taking place in 2005 and again in 2006. For 2007, 2008 and 2009 the airshow was called the Big Event and featured a funfair as well as the air displays.

== See also ==
- Thanet
- North Thanet
- Palm Bay Primary School

Local Council

- Thanet District Council
