= Chalk =

Soft carbonate rock

- Sedimentary rock
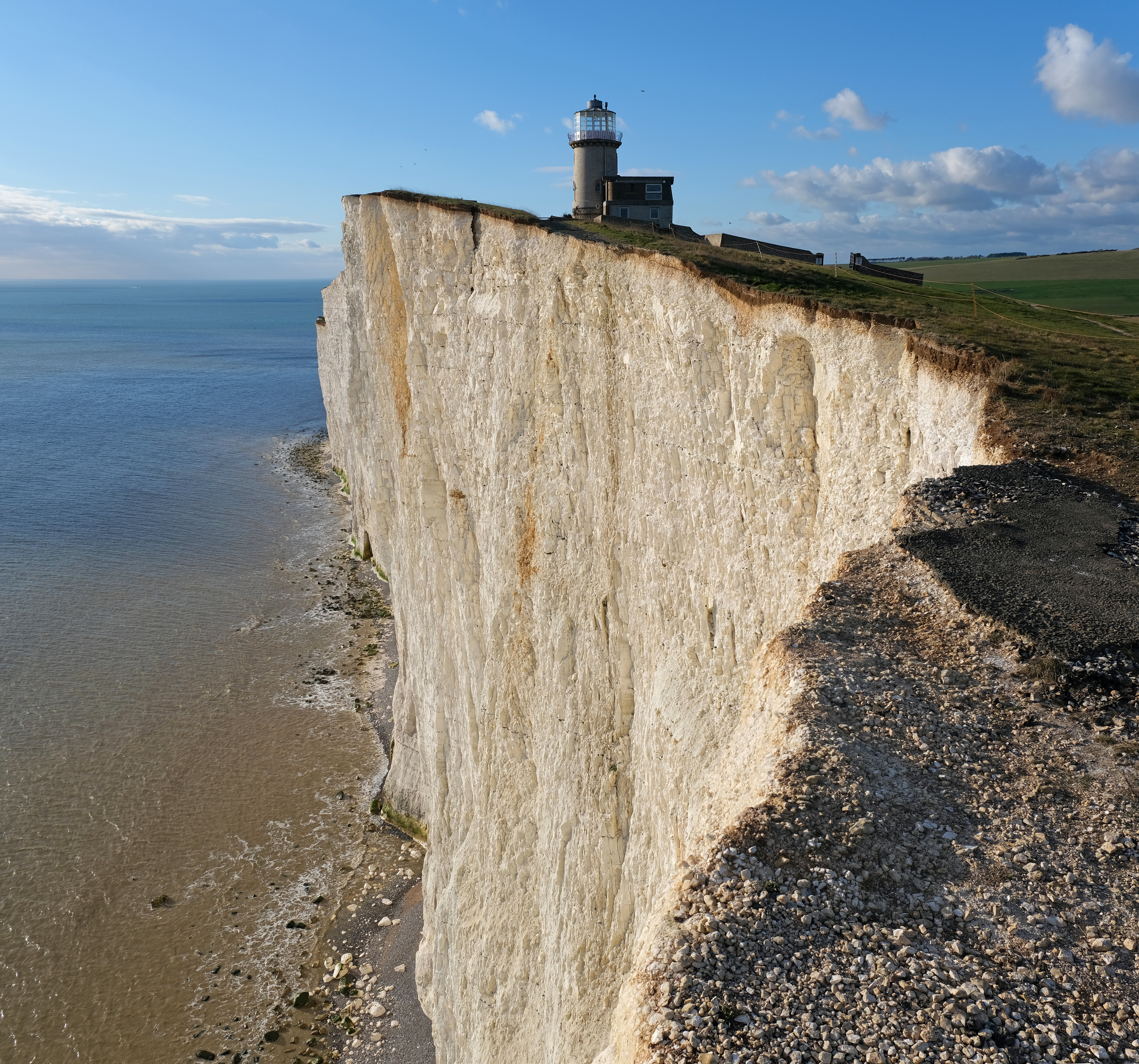
- Beachy Head is a part of the extensive Southern England Chalk Formation.

Composition
- Calcite (calcium carbonate)

Chalk is a soft, white, porous, sedimentary carbonate rock. It is a form of limestone composed of the mineral calcite and originally formed under the sea by the accumulation and lithification of hard parts of organisms, mostly microscopic plankton, which had settled to the sea floor. Chalk is common throughout Western Europe, where deposits underlie parts of France, and steep cliffs are often seen where they meet the sea in places such as the Dover cliffs on the Kent coast of the English Channel.

Chalk is mined for use in industry, such as for quicklime, bricks and builder's putty, and in agriculture, for raising pH in soils with high acidity. It is also used for "blackboard chalk" for writing and drawing on various types of surfaces, although these can also be manufactured from other carbonate-based minerals or gypsum.

== Description ==
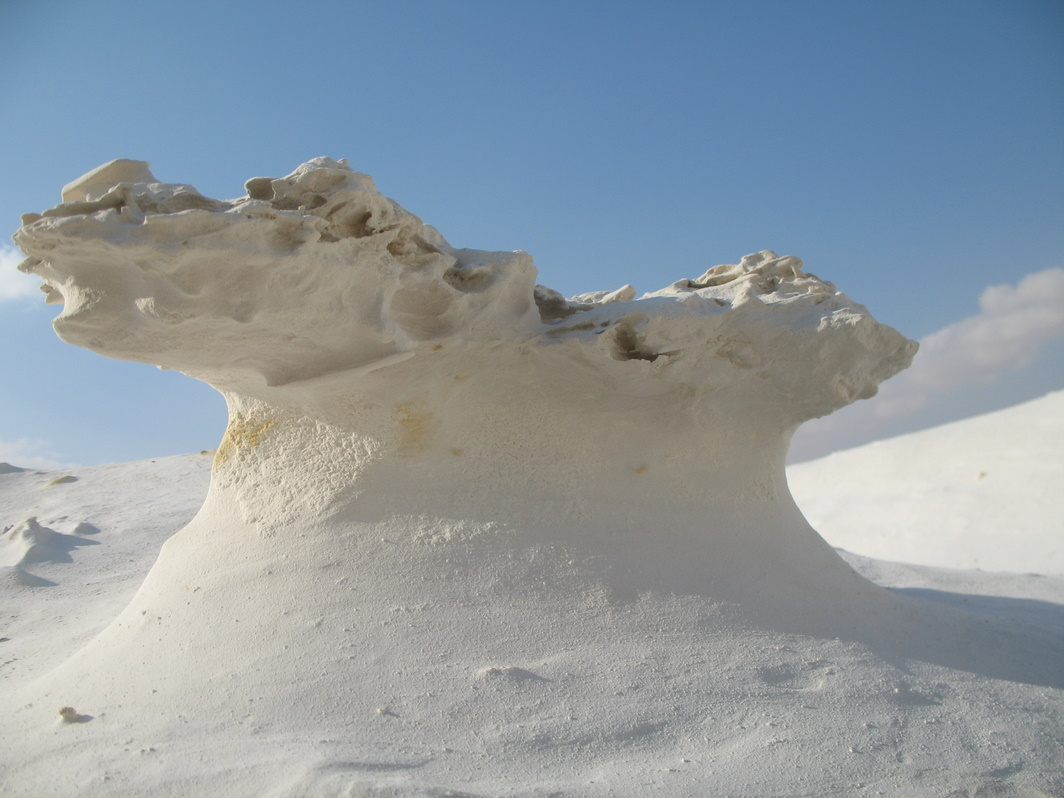
"Nitzana Chalk curves" situated at Western Negev, Israel, are chalk deposits formed in the Mesozoic era's Tethys Ocean

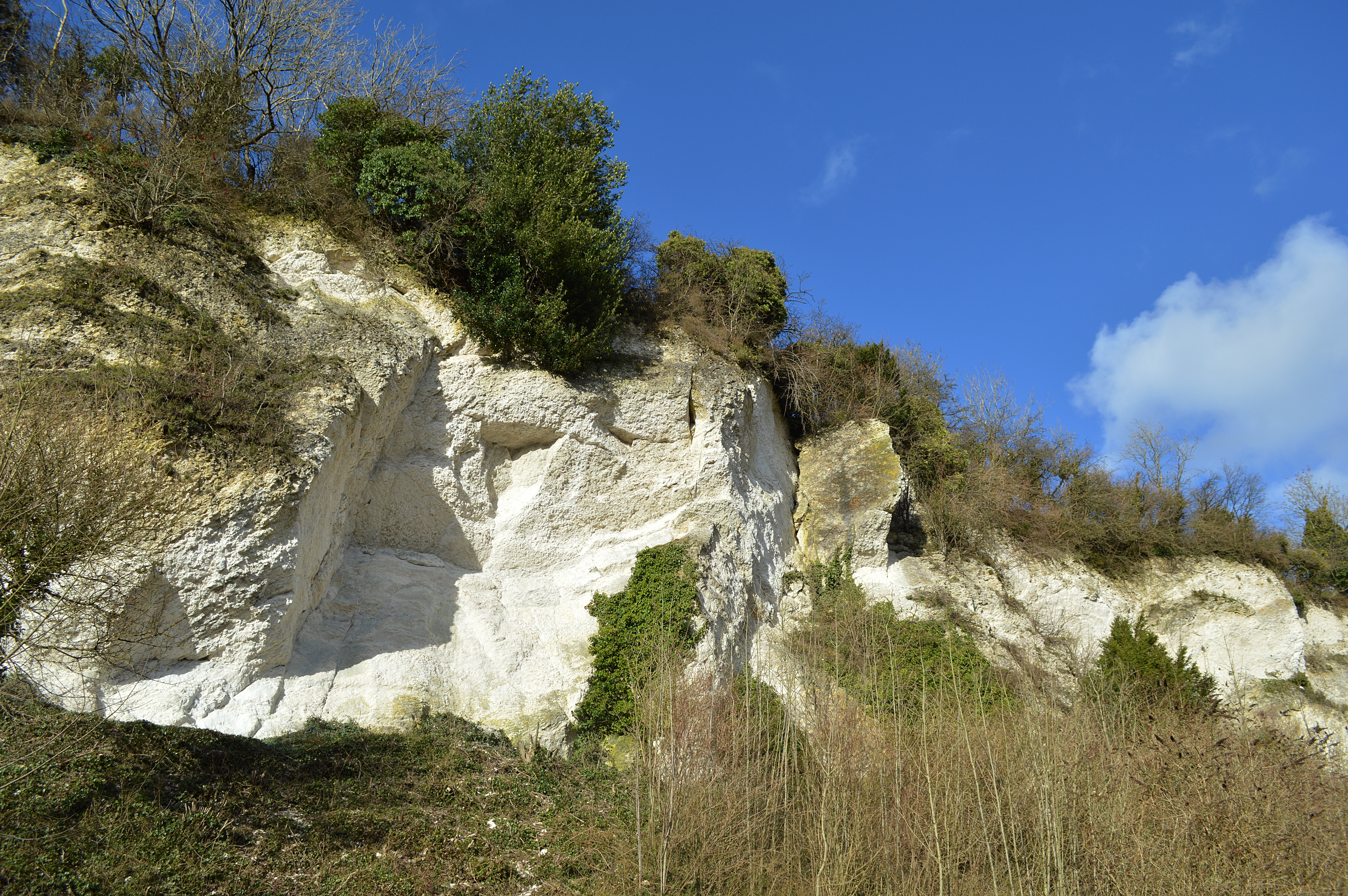
Open chalk pit, Seale, Surrey, UK

Chalk is a fine-textured, earthy type of limestone distinguished by its light colour, softness, and high porosity. It is composed mostly of tiny fragments of the calcite shells or skeletons of plankton, such as foraminifera or coccolithophores. These fragments mostly take the form of calcite plates ranging from 0.5 to 4 microns in size, though about 10% to 25% of a typical chalk is composed of fragments that are 10 to 100 microns in size. The larger fragments include intact plankton skeletons and skeletal fragments of larger organisms, such as molluscs, echinoderms, or bryozoans.

Chalk is typically almost pure calcite, CaCO_{3}, with just 2% to 4% of other minerals. These are usually quartz and clay minerals, though collophane (cryptocrystalline apatite, a phosphate mineral) is also sometimes present, as nodules or as small pellets interpreted as faecal pellets. In some chalk beds, the calcite has been converted to dolomite, CaMg(CO_{3})_{2}, and in a few cases the dolomitized chalk has been dedolomitized back to calcite.

Chalk is highly porous, with typical values of porosity ranging from 35 to 47 per cent. While it is similar in appearance to both gypsum and diatomite, chalk is identifiable by its hardness, fossil content, and its reaction to acid (it produces effervescence on contact).

== Formation ==
In Western Europe, chalk was formed in the Late Cretaceous Epoch and the early Palaeocene Epoch (between 100 and 61 million years ago). It was deposited on extensive continental shelves at depths between 100 and 600 metres (330 and 1,970 ft), during a time of nonseasonal (likely arid) climate that reduced the amount of erosion from nearby exposed rock. The lack of nearby erosion explains the high purity of chalk. The coccolithophores, foraminifera, and other microscopic organisms, from which the chalk came, mostly form low-magnesium calcite skeletons, so the sediments were already in the form of highly stable low-magnesium calcite when deposited. This is in contrast with most other limestones, which formed from high-magnesium calcite or aragonite that rapidly converted to the more stable low-magnesium calcite after deposition, resulting in the early cementation of such limestones. In chalk, the absence of calcium carbonate conversion process prevented early cementation, and it accounts for chalk's high porosity. Additionally, chalk is the only form of limestone that commonly shows signs of compaction.

Flint (a type of chert) is very common as bands parallel to the bedding or as nodules in seams, or linings to fractures, embedded in chalk. It is probably derived from sponge spicules or other siliceous organisms as water is expelled upwards during compaction. Flint is often deposited around larger fossils such as Echinoidea which may be silicified (i.e. replaced molecule by molecule by flint).

== Geology and geographic distribution ==
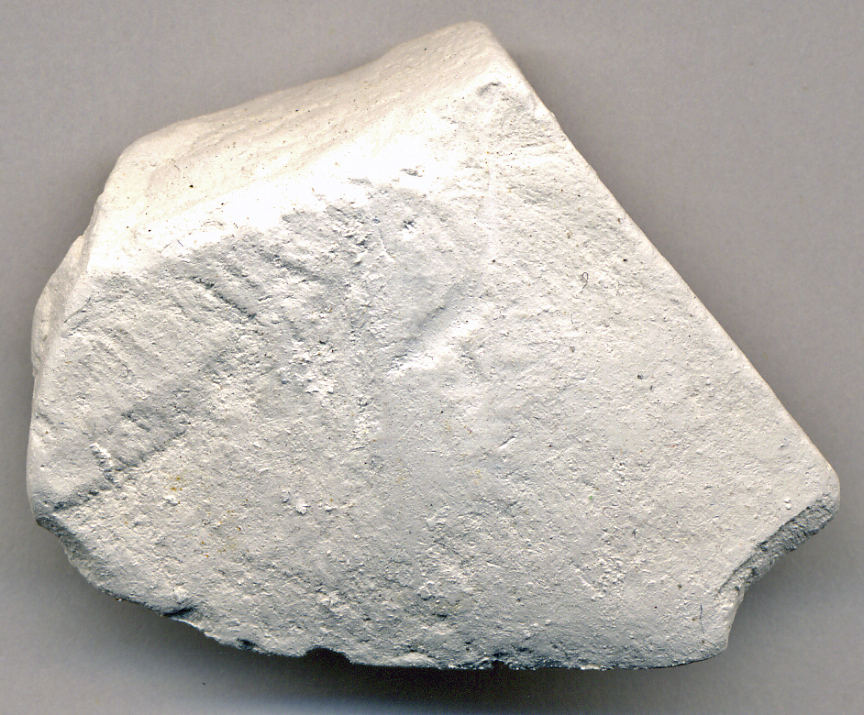
Chalk from the White Cliffs of Dover, England

Chalk is so common in Cretaceous marine beds that the Cretaceous Period was named for these deposits. The name Cretaceous was derived from Latin creta, meaning chalk. Some deposits of chalk were formed after the Cretaceous.

The Chalk Group is a European stratigraphic unit deposited during the late Cretaceous Period. It forms the famous White Cliffs of Dover in Kent, England, as well as their counterparts of the Cap Blanc-Nez on the other side of the Dover Strait. The Champagne region of France is mostly underlain by chalk deposits, which contain artificial caves used for wine storage. Some of the highest chalk cliffs in the world occur at Jasmund National Park in Germany and at Møns Klint in Denmark.

Chalk deposits are also found in Cretaceous beds on other continents, such as the Austin Chalk, Selma Group, and Niobrara Formations of the North American interior. Chalk is also found in western Egypt (Khoman Formation) and western Australia (Miria Formation).

Chalk of Oligocene to Neogene age has been found in drill cores of rock under the Pacific Ocean at Stewart Arch in the Solomon Islands.

There are layers of chalk, containing Globorotalia, in the Nicosia Formation of Cyprus, which formed during the Pliocene.

== Mining ==
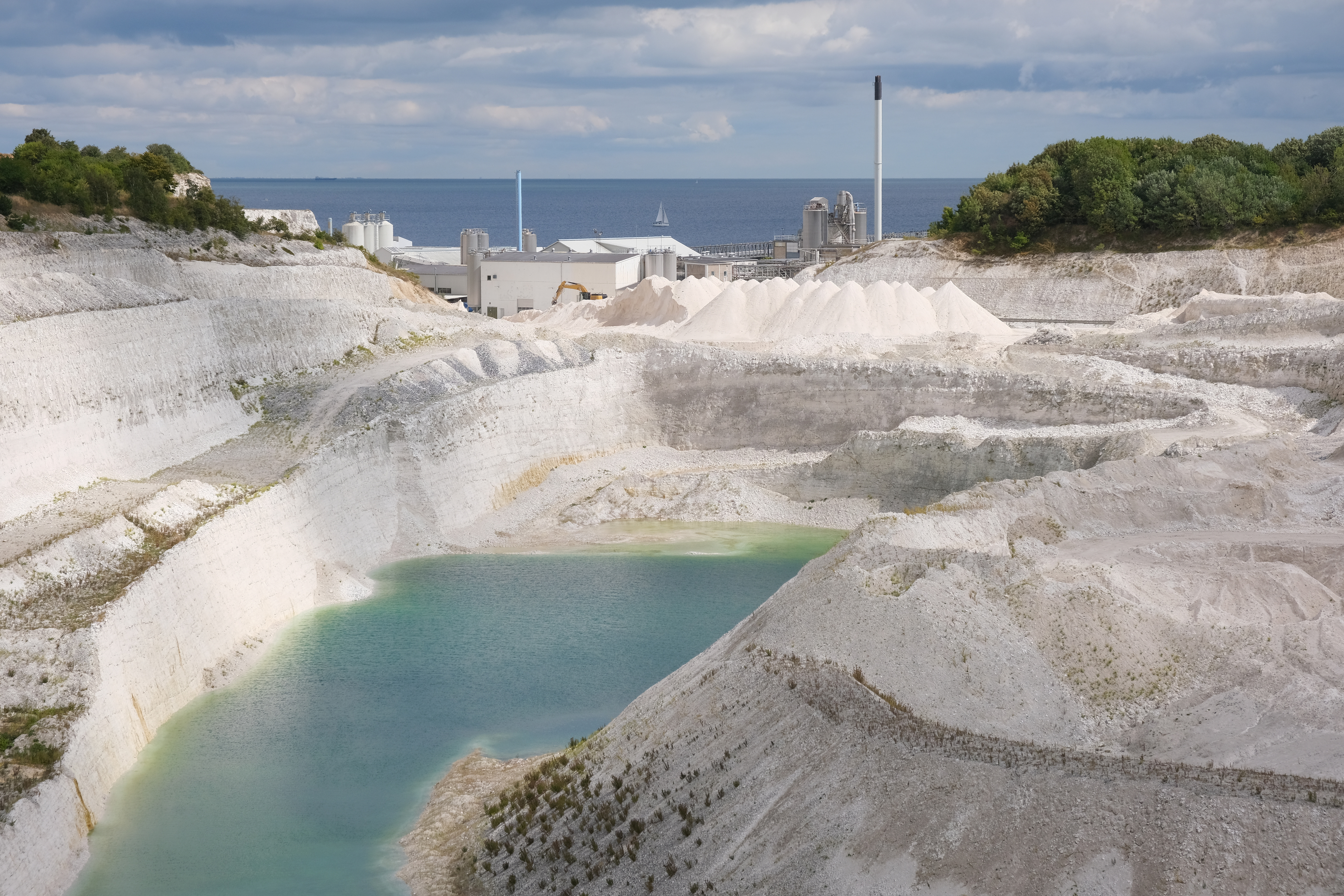
Stevns chalk quarry in Denmark

Chalk is mined from chalk deposits both above ground and underground. Chalk mining boomed during the Industrial Revolution, due to the great need for cement, as well as quicklime and bricks.

== Uses ==
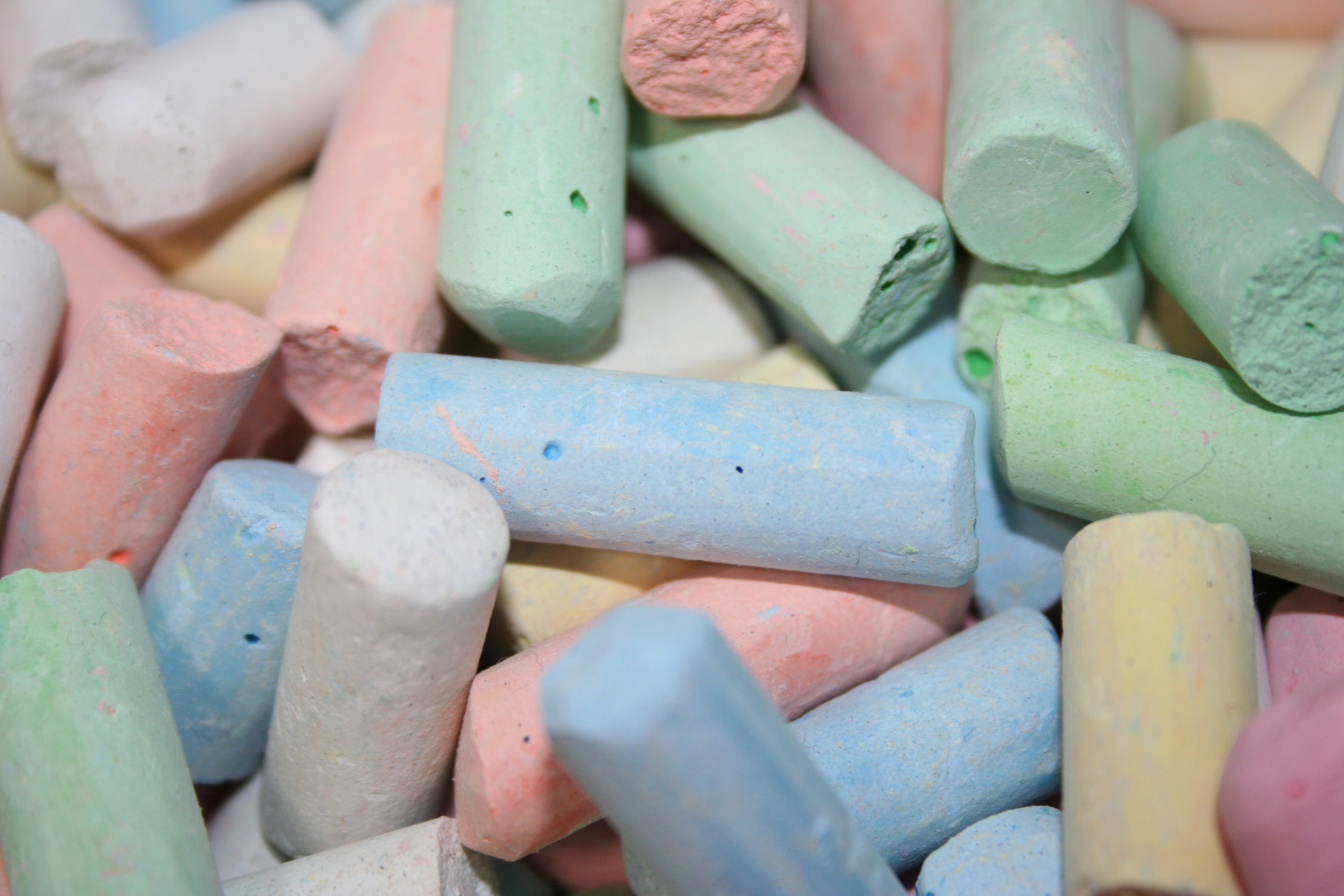
Chalk in different colors

Most people first encounter chalk in school where it refers to blackboard chalk, which was originally made of mineral chalk, since it easily crumbles and leaves particles that stick loosely to rough surfaces, allowing it to make writing that can be readily erased. Blackboard chalk manufacturers now may use mineral chalk, other mineral sources of calcium carbonate, or the mineral gypsum (calcium sulfate). While gypsum-based blackboard chalk is the lowest cost to produce, and thus widely used in the developing world, use of carbonate-based chalk produces larger particles and thus less dust, and it is marketed as "dustless chalk".

Coloured chalks, pastel chalks, and sidewalk chalk (shaped into larger sticks and often coloured), used to draw on sidewalks, streets, and driveways, are primarily made of gypsum rather than calcium carbonate chalk.

Black chalk is similarly used by artists for drawing. It is a bituminous or carbonaceous shale, rather than calcium carbonate. Similarly red chalk, made of red ochre, is used for drawing in red.

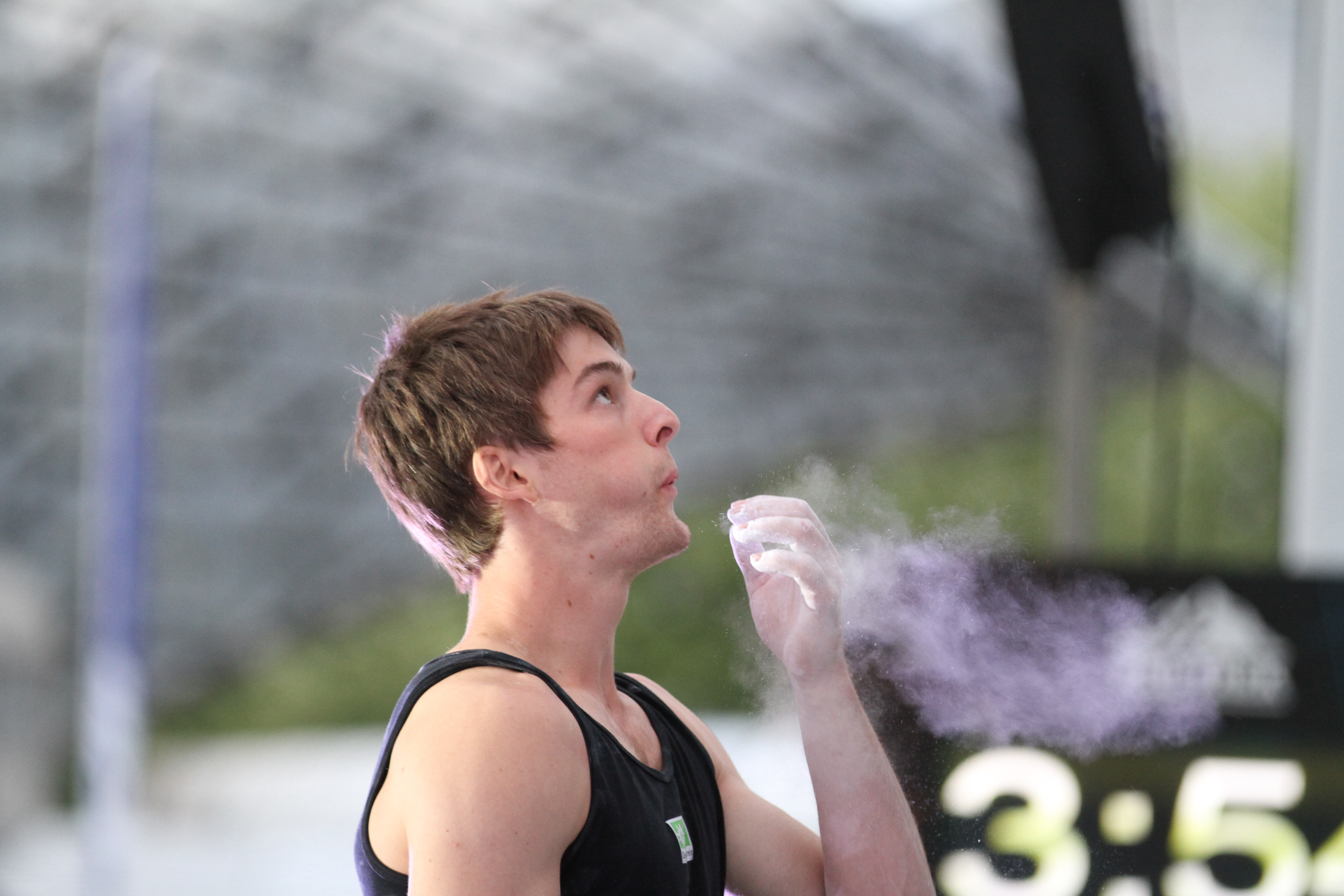
Climber Jan Hojer blows surplus chalk from his hand.

Magnesium carbonate chalk is commonly used as a drying agent to obtain better grip by gymnasts and rock climbers.

Glazing putty mainly contains chalk as a filler in linseed oil.

Chalk and other forms of limestone may be used for their properties as a base. Chalk is a source of quicklime by thermal decomposition, or slaked lime following quenching of quicklime with water. In agriculture, chalk is used for raising pH in soils with high acidity. Small doses of chalk can also be used as an antacid. Additionally, the small particles of chalk make it a substance ideal for cleaning and polishing. For example, toothpaste commonly contains small amounts of chalk, which serves as a mild abrasive. Polishing chalk is chalk prepared with a carefully controlled grain size, for very fine polishing of metals.

French chalk (also known as tailor's chalk) is traditionally a hard chalk used to make temporary markings on cloth, mainly by tailors. It is now usually made of talc (magnesium silicate).

Chalk beds form important petroleum reservoirs in the North Sea and along the Gulf Coast of North America.

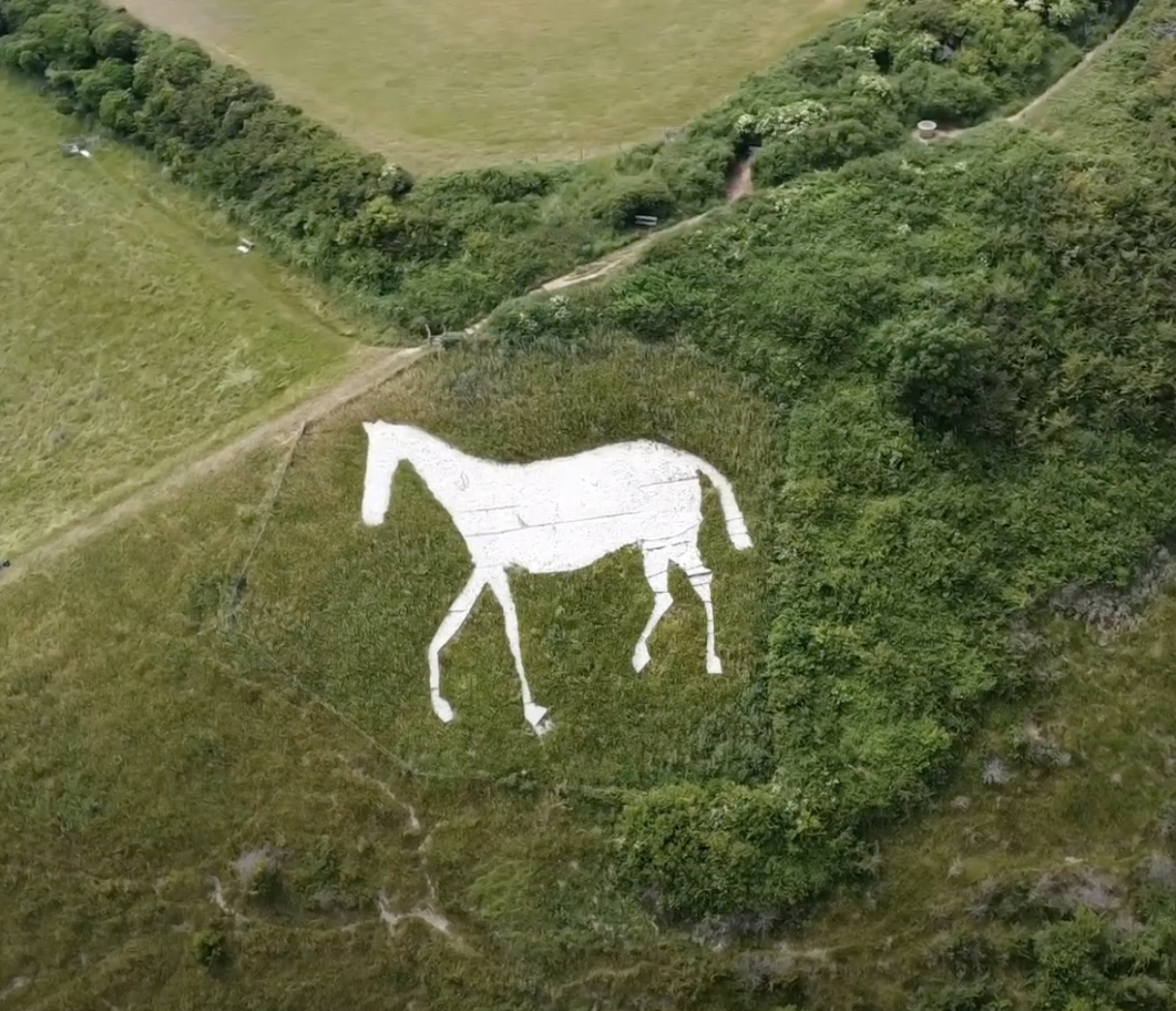
The Litlington White Horse, a hill figure created by exposing the natural whiteness of the chalk bedrock.

The high contrast between white chalk and green turf has led to the creation of hill figures throughout the chalk downlands of England. By "scouring"—the process of removing the overlying vegetation to reveal the porous white limestone beneath—monumental geoglyphs are created. A notable 20th-century example is the Litlington White Horse located in East Sussex. Managed by the National Trust, the figure is maintained by periodically clearing away encroaching weeds and refreshing the exposed chalk surfaces to preserve its visibility against the hillside.

=== Previous uses ===
In southeast England, deneholes are a notable example of ancient chalk pits. Such bell pits may also mark the sites of ancient flint mines, where the prime object was to remove flint nodules for stone tool manufacture. The surface remains at Cissbury Ring are one such example, but perhaps the most famous is the extensive complex at Grime's Graves in Norfolk.

Chalk was traditionally used in recreation. In field sports, such as tennis played on grass, powdered chalk was used to mark the boundary lines of the playing field or court. If a ball hits the line, a cloud of chalk or pigment dust will be visible. In recent years, powdered chalk has been replaced with titanium dioxide. In gymnastics, rock-climbing, weightlifting and tug of war, chalk — now usually magnesium carbonate — is applied to the hands and feet to remove perspiration and reduce slipping.

Chalk may also be used as a house construction material instead of brick or wattle and daub: quarried chalk was cut into blocks and used as ashlar, or loose chalk was rammed into blocks and laid in mortar. There are still houses standing which have been constructed using chalk as the main building material. Most are pre-Victorian though a few are more recent.

A mixture of chalk and mercury can be used as fingerprint powder. However, because of the toxicity of the mercury, the use of such mixtures for fingerprinting was abandoned in 1967.

== See also ==
- Blackboard – Reusable writing surface
- Chalk carving – Method of shaping chalk
- Chalk line – Tool for marking straight lines
- Chalk stream – Rivers rising from chalk bedrock
- Chalking the door – Christian tradition of blessing one's home
- Chalking the door (eviction) – Scottish legal practice
- Chalk (military) – Military term for a group of paratroopers that deploys from a single aircraft
- Climbing chalk – Powder used to improve grip of the hands
- Clunch – Traditional building material of chalky limestone rock
- Hill figure – Type of landscape design
- Pastel – Powdered-pigment-based art medium
- Sanguine (red chalk) – Redddish brown drawing material
- List of types of limestone – Limestone deposits listed by location
- Warchalking – Graffiti indicating open Wi-Fi
