= Vagina Museum =

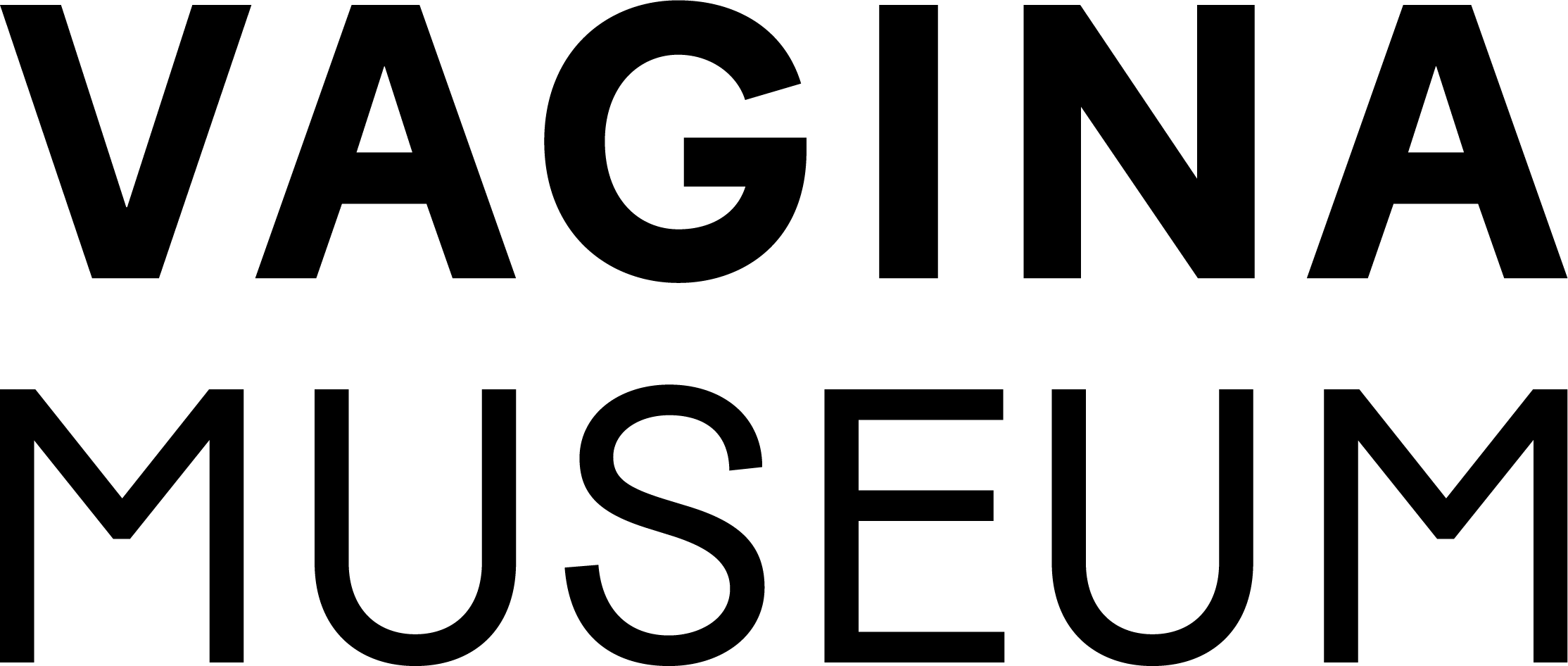

- Location within Greater London
- Established: March 2017
- Location: London, UK
- Type: Museum
- Visitors: 119,000 (2020)
- Founder: Florence Schechter
- Website: vaginamuseum.co.uk

The Vagina Museum is the world's first brick and mortar museum about the female reproductive system. The project is based in the United Kingdom, and moved into its first fixed location in Camden Market, London, in October 2019. Its first exhibition opened on 16 November 2019. It moved to its second premises in Bethnal Green in March 2022 where it remained until February 2023. It reopened in its next long-term home in two railway arches in Bethnal Green in November 2023.

== Description ==
The Vagina Museum was founded by Florence Schechter in response to a lack of gynaecological representation within the culture and heritage sector throughout the world. The museum usually hosts two temporary exhibitions per year which explore a multitude of topics surrounding gynaecological health, social history, activism and discourse, as well as an events programme of talks, workshops, comedy, theatre and performance art.

== History ==
The project to create the Vagina Museum was launched when the founder, Florence Schechter, discovered there was a penis museum in Iceland, the Icelandic Phallological Museum, but there was no equivalent for the vagina or vulva.

=== 2017–2018: Pop up phase ===
The museum's first event, a comedy fundraiser, was held on 19 May 2017 headlined by Hayley Ellis. It has run a number of events since, including participating in a residency with The Mothership Group called Superculture. Events as part of this residency have included a talk on "Vulvanomics" by Emma L. E. Rees, author of The Vagina: A Literary and Cultural History, and a screening of the 2007 film Teeth (see vagina dentata) followed by a Q&A with Amanda DiGioia, the author of Childbirth and Parenting in Horror Texts: The Marginalized and the Monstrous and various comedy nights. They have also held events at Limmud Festival 2017 and the Royal Institution.

The museum held its first exhibition in August 2017 in Edinburgh, Scotland. Its second pop up exhibition was called "Is Your Vagina Normal?", and it travelled around the UK to Ancient House, Thetford, Brainchild Festival 2018, SQIFF 2018, and Museums Association Conference 2018.

In the 2017 Women of the Future Awards, Schechter was commended in the arts and culture category for her work with the Vagina Museum.

A permanent museum was proposed with exhibitions on gynaecological anatomy from science to art to culture, which was to be trans-inclusive.

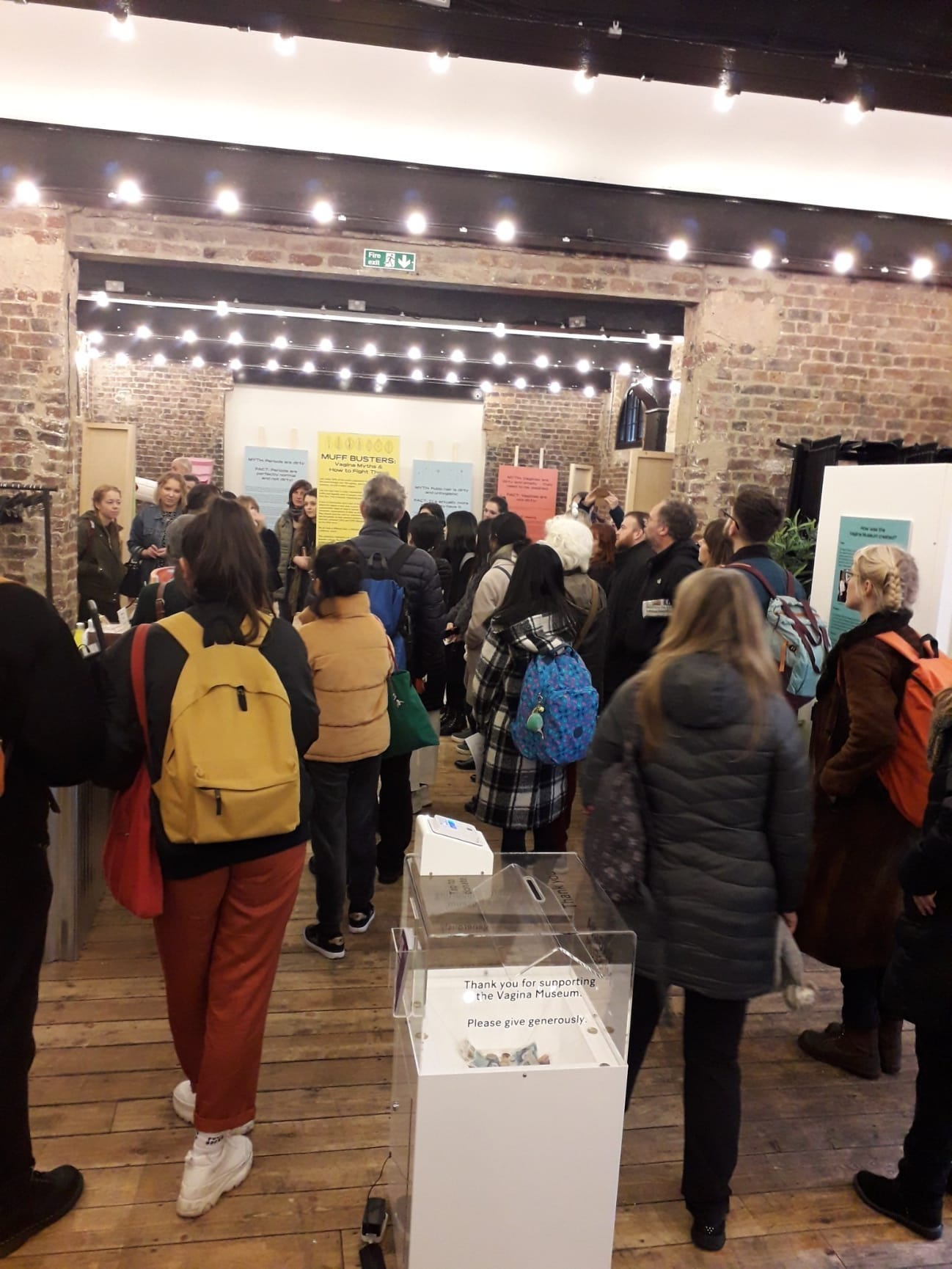
Visitors at the inaugural exhibition "Muff Busters - Vagina Myths and How To Fight Them"

=== 2019: Camden Market premises ===
On 21 March 2019, the Vagina Museum launched a crowdfunder to raise money to open a premises in Camden Market.

The project was supported by Camden Council, and leader of Camden Council Georgia Gould said:

Camden has a proud and radical history of challenging prejudice and orthodoxy, however, we acknowledge that the stigma associated with talking about gynaecological health has meant ignorance, confusion, shame, and poor medical care for too many. 65% of 16-to-25 year olds say they have a problem using the word vagina or vulva with almost half of 18-to-24 year old women say they are too embarrassed to talk about sexual health issues. We are therefore incredibly excited that the Vagina Museum is seeking to establish in Camden, and hope that it is funded to provide an inclusive and intersectional centre for learning, creativity, activism, and outreach that will add immeasurably to our collective understanding of our bodies.

The crowdfunder raised £48,945 and in October 2019, the museum moved into Camden Stables Market and began a programme of events. It opened its first exhibition, Muff Busters: vagina myths and how to fight them in November 2019. This exhibition was scheduled to end on 29 March 2020, but closed a few days earlier due to national lockdown restrictions in the UK. The next exhibition, Periods: A Brief History opened on 21 May 2021.

In August 2021, the museum announced that its landlord had decided not to extend its lease beyond September. The Camden Market site closed but the museum retained its online presence while it sought a new premises. On 22 February 2022, it announced a relocation to 18 Victoria Park Square in Bethnal Green and a scheduled reopening date of 19 March 2022.

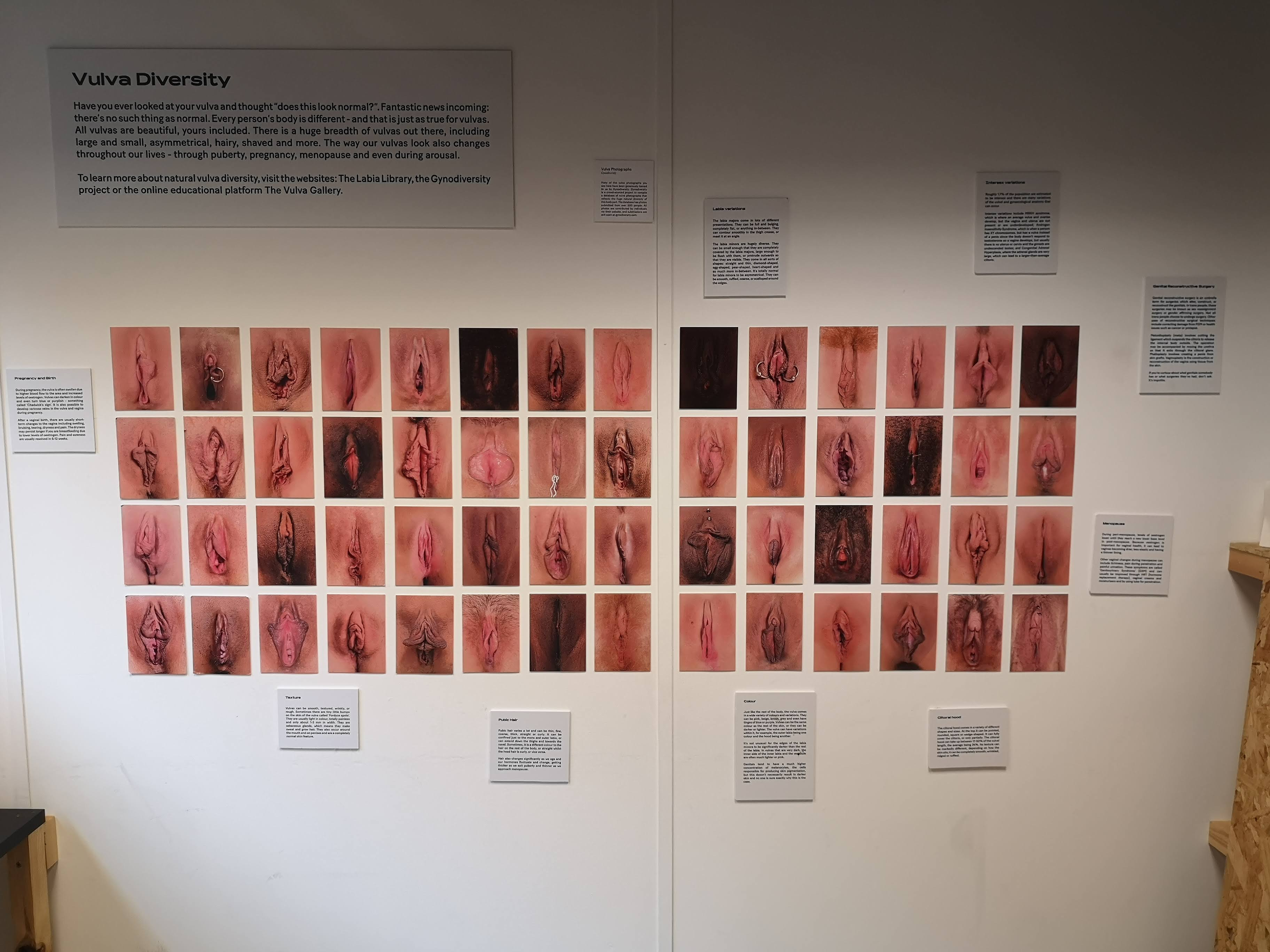
Vulva diversity display in the permanent exhibition at the Victoria Park Square location

=== 2022–2023: Victoria Park Square, Bethnal Green premises ===
On 19 March, the Vagina Museum reopened at 18 Victoria Park Square in Bethnal Green. The museum opened with its exhibition Periods: A Brief History, along with a new permanent exhibition titled From A to V. Prior to the reopening, the museum was advertised on billboards in the vicinity with cheeky puns about other local businesses in the area.

The Vagina Museum closed its original Bethnal Green premises on 2 February 2023.

=== 2023–present: Poyser Street, Bethnal Green premises ===
Following a fundraising drive in 2023 raising over £85,000 in which over 2,500 people donated, the museum found new premises on Poyser Street, Bethnal Green. It signed a lease with The Arch Co for six years. The museum reopened in November 2023, initially on the ground floor only as lifts were not yet available. A range of temporary exhibitions are planned, with the first one about endometriosis. Its first exhibition in its temporary gallery, titled "Endometriosis: Into The Unknown" was created in collaboration with Oxford EndoCare, part of the Nuffield Department of Women's and Reproductive Health, and the Wellcome Centre for Human Genetics based at the University of Oxford.

In 2024, the Vagina Museum opened two further galleries, a "community gallery" and a permanent exhibition gallery. During Pride 2024, the Crab Museum in Margate hosted a temporary exhibition in partnership with the Vagina Museum. In October 2024, to mark Black History Month, the Museum announced that the galleries would be named after the "Mothers of Gynecology": Anarcha, Lucy, and Betsey.

== See also ==
- Culture and menstruation
- Icelandic Phallological Museum
- List of sex museums
- Vagina and vulva in art
- Vulva activism
