= Cliftonville =

Area of Margate, Kent, England

Coordinates: 51.3881°N 1.4046°E

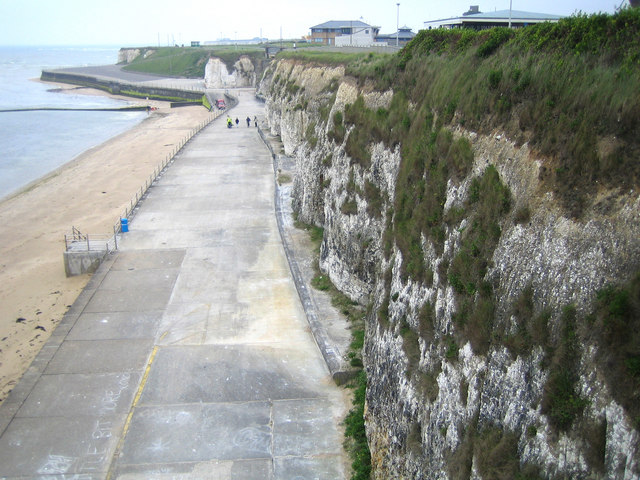
- Walpole Bay cliffs, Cliftonville

- Location within Kent
- Population: 12,900 (2005)
- OS grid reference: TR369709
- District: Thanet
- Shire county: Kent
- Region: South East
- Country: England
- Sovereign state: United Kingdom
- Post town: Margate
- Postcode district: CT9
- Dialling code: 01843
- Police: Kent
- Fire: Kent
- Ambulance: South East Coast
- UK Parliament: East Thanet

Cliftonville is a coastal area of Margate in the Thanet district of Kent, England. It includes the Palm Bay estate, built in the 1930s with wide avenues and detached and semi-detached houses with driveways, garages and gardens.

== East Cliftonville ==
The estate covers the eastern part of Cliftonville and was fields when first built. It extends east beyond Northumberland Avenue and has been developed in phases. An earlier phase covered the northern ends of Leicester and Gloucester Avenues and the whole of Clarence and Magnolia Avenues; the later phase extending eastwards of Princess Margaret Avenue is a Wimpey-style housing estate with small houses largely identical in appearance and of less substantial build quality than the original 1930s estate.

The eastward expansion of Cliftonville has included much of the former parish of Northdown including Northdown Park and House.

== West Cliftonville ==
West Cliftonville was originally developed as an upmarket resort. It had until the 1980s many small private hotels and guest houses. The seafront area once included a large Butlins complex.

== Facilities ==
The shopping area of Cliftonville is called Northdown Road and includes a number of main banks and building societies, larger corporate concerns including Costa and Tesco, a number of family run specialist shops including an award-winning art gallery, a post office, several pubs and bars, many unique and upmarket coffee shops and cafes, three churches and a number of estate and letting agents as well as an award-winning media company all along its two-mile length.

=== Tidal pool ===
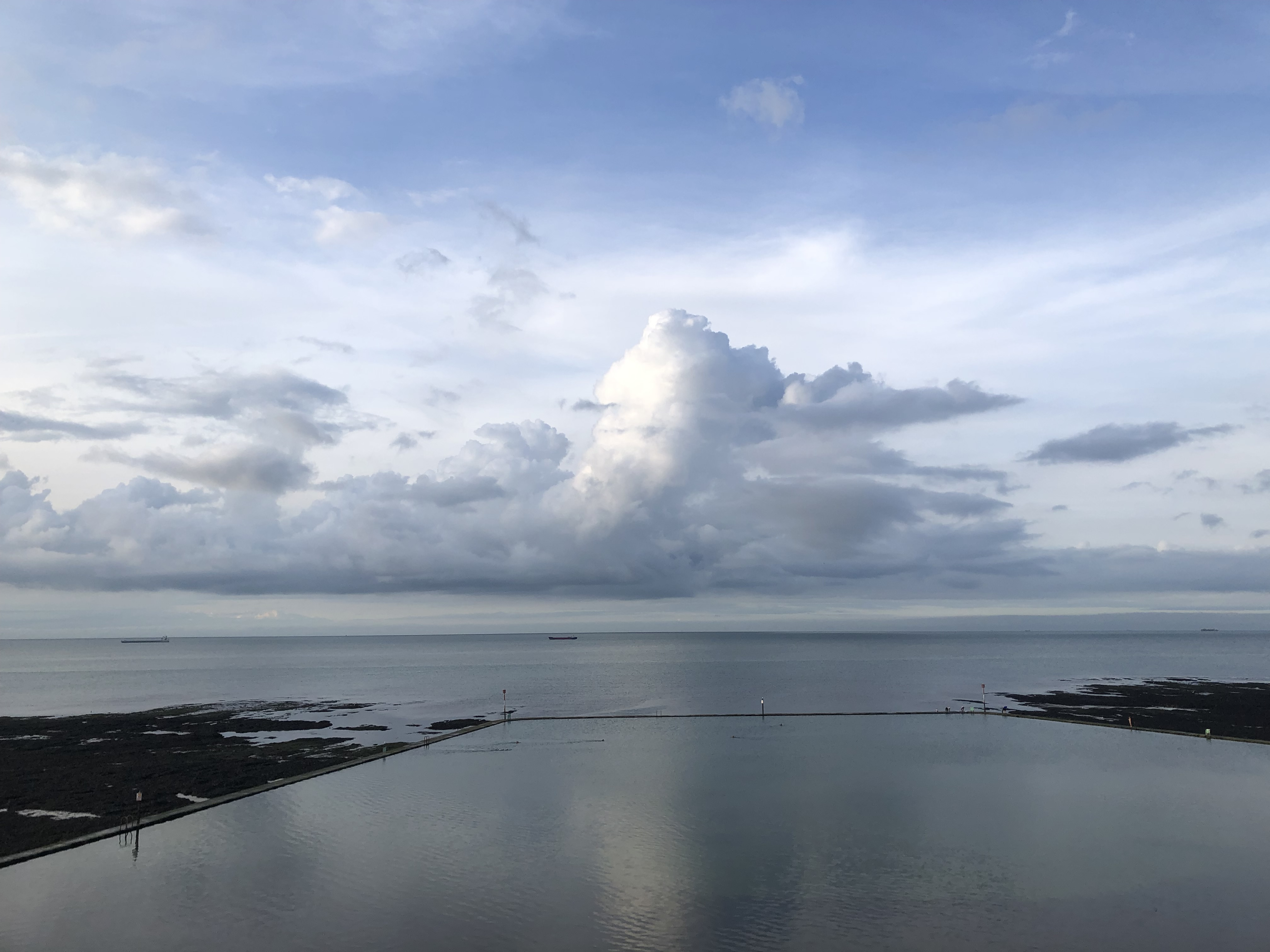
The View of Walpole Bay Tidal Pool from the nearby cliff

The Walpole Bay Tidal Pool is a tidal lido pool in the village. The pool was opened in 1937 and is a Grade II listed structure. The pool covers over four acres and its dimensions are 450 ft long, 300 ft wide at the seaward end and 550 ft long at the landward end. It cost circa £7,000. It was designed by Margate Borough Engineer A E Borg.

The Pool covers around 4 acres and is believed to be the largest tidal pool in the UK. During high tide the walls of the pool are totally submerged by the sea. As the tide recedes, water drains out through drainage points around the edge of pool. There are freshwater springs within the walls of the pool which feed into the water.

The pool is popular with the local community and is used regularly throughout the year, even during the winter months. Aside from the nearby carpark there are currently no additional facilities, such as showers or toilets for users of the pool. The pool is never staffed with a lifeguard.

North Irish filmmaker Kathryn Ferguson made a documentary short about the tidal pool, called Taking the Waters in 2018.

== Entertainment ==
Cliftonville also has an indoor ten-pin bowling alley and sports bar, tennis courts. The Oval Bandstand and Lawns is a significant part of Cliftonville's cultural landscape. The Oval Bandstand is a large capacity outdoor amphitheatre in Cliftonville and is open throughout the year. The Oval Lawns comprises over 4 acres of public amenity space owned and managed by not-for-profit GRASS Cliftonville CIC. This year the social enterprise will be hosting over 25 Summer Sunday community events, 4 outdoor cinemas, and will welcome over 15,000 visitors through the gates.

The famous Winter Gardens theatre was built in 1911 in a neo-Grecian style, designed by the Borough Surveyor, Mr E A Borg . Faith In Strangers also exists in Cliftonville Faith in Strangers A 350 capacity venue, bar, workspace and soon to be restaurant, open to all. Margate Arts Club is a small venue with membership for the artistic crowd of Cliftonville.

== Writing and poetry ==
During the first half of the 20th century Cliftonville was considered the fashionable hotel quarter of Margate. It was during the autumn of 1921 that T.S. Eliot spent a period of convalescence at the Albemarle Hotel, Cliftonville. His widow has confirmed that he found inspiration for, and wrote significant sections of The Waste Land in the Grade II-listed Nayland Rock promenade shelter.

The spirit of early 20th century Cliftonville was caught by John Betjeman in his poem "Margate Pier".

== Notable people ==
The stage and film actor Trevor Howard was born in Cliftonville in 1913.

- Frederick Treves (actor), born Cliftonville, 1932.

== See also ==
- Botany Bay, Kent
- Shell Grotto, Margate
