= Chalking the door (eviction) =

Scottish legal practice

In Scotland through the mid- to late 1800s, chalking the door of a tenement was a way of notifying residents that they must move out by a given day.

By custom, leases and other similar contracts began or ended on the Scottish term days, which are Whitsunday and Martinmas. If a landlord wished to evict tenants in a particular tenement, the law dictated that, at the landlord's request, a burgh officer, in presence of witnesses, would chalk the primary door of the tenement forty days before Whitsunday or St. Martin's Day. The burgh officer would then record the fact that the chalking had been accomplished and this document was signed by the officer and the witnesses.

The chalking indicated to tenants that they must vacate the premises by the next Term Day, when the lease expired. Tenants who failed to vacate by that date could then be evicted on six days' notice via a so-called "charge".
