= Chalk mining =

Extracting chalk from deposits by mining

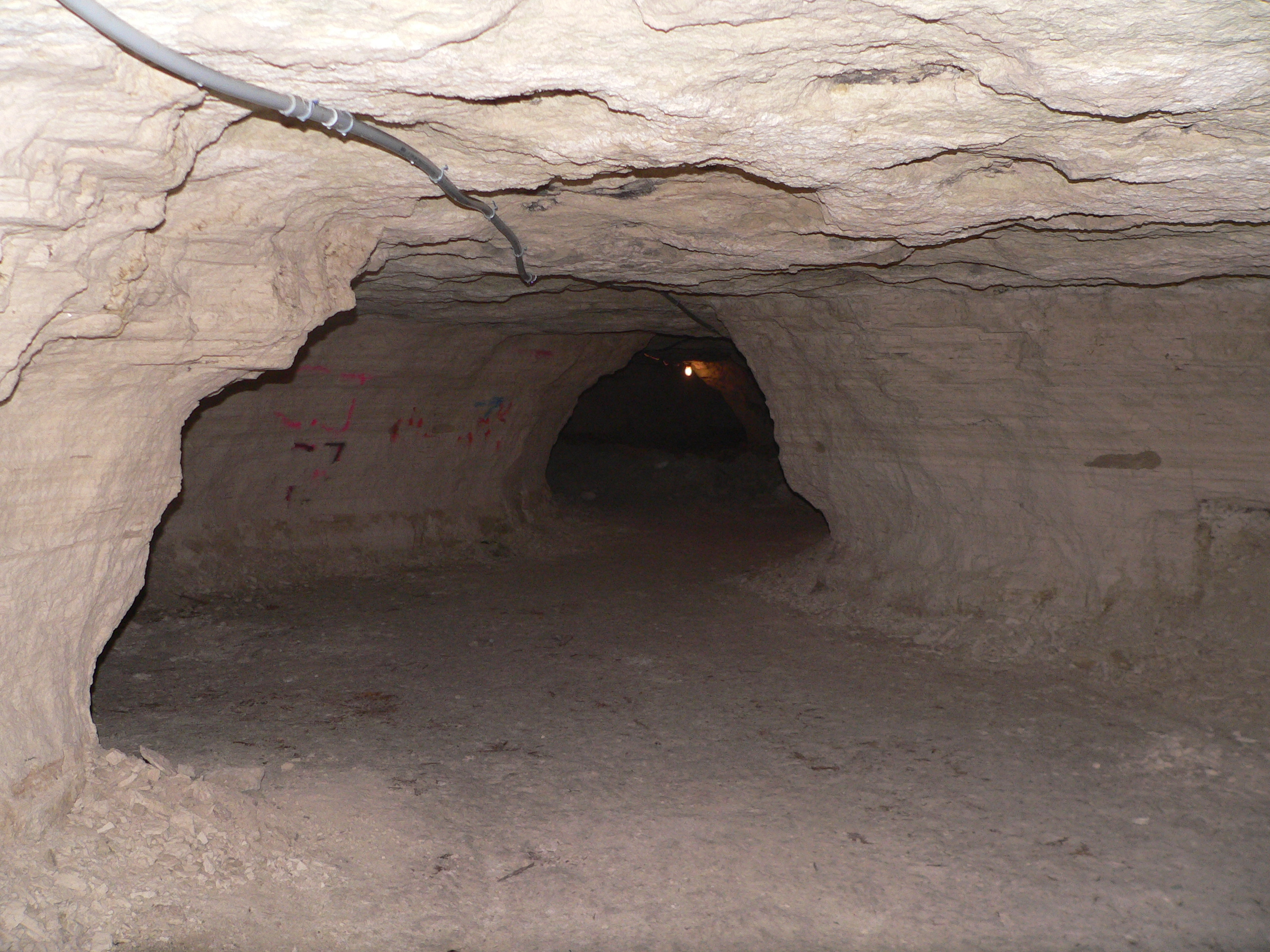
Chalk mine near Scotia, Nebraska

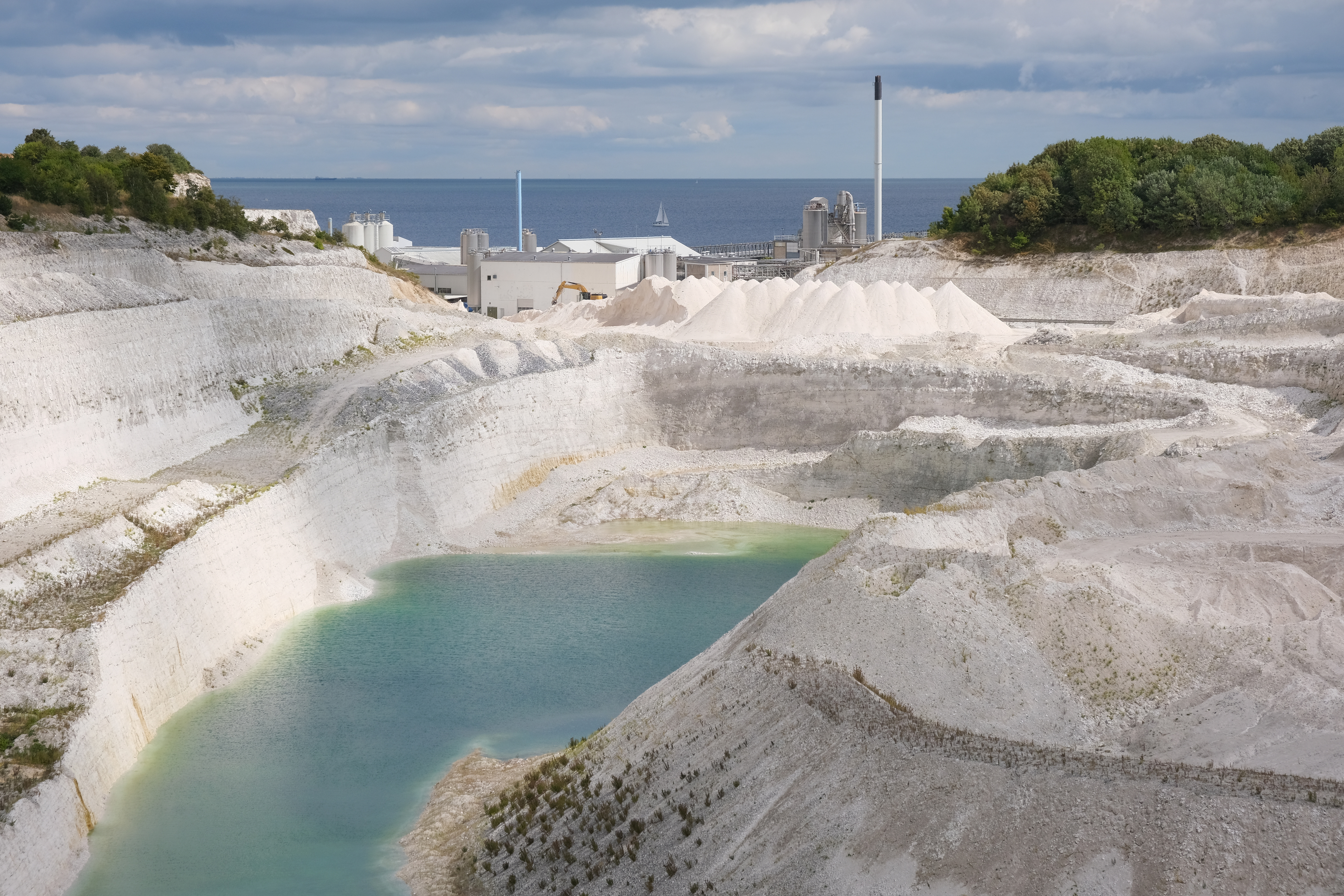
Open pit chalk quarry in Stevns, Denmark

Chalk mining is the extraction of chalk from underground and above ground deposits by mining. Mined chalk is used mostly to make cement and bricks.

Chalk mining was widespread in Britain in the 19th century because of the large amount of construction underway (and the Industrial Revolution). Some chalk mines were extensively large, with passages up to 25 feet (7.6 m) high and 15 feet (4.6 m) wide, their passages taking the form of a Norman arch. Because of chalk's softness, picks and shovels were used to excavate tunnels. Stepped slabs were dug into the chalk, allowing many miners to dig at the same time. Care had to be taken to avoid collapse, and places in which the chalk was soft were simply abandoned.

A link was reported in the United Kingdom in 2017 between sinkholes opening up and the location of former chalk mines. The softness of chalk, as well as rain and erosion, has caused the ground in some places to collapse into the remnants of ancient chalk mines and tunnels.

== See also ==
- Denehole
- Rügen chalk
