= Shell room =

A shell room may refer to:

- Shell grotto – an early modern decorative folly
  - The Shell Room at Woburn Abbey in England
- Magazine (artillery)#Naval magazines – a room for military ammunition, especially naval
