= Grotto =

Natural or artificial cave associated with use by humans

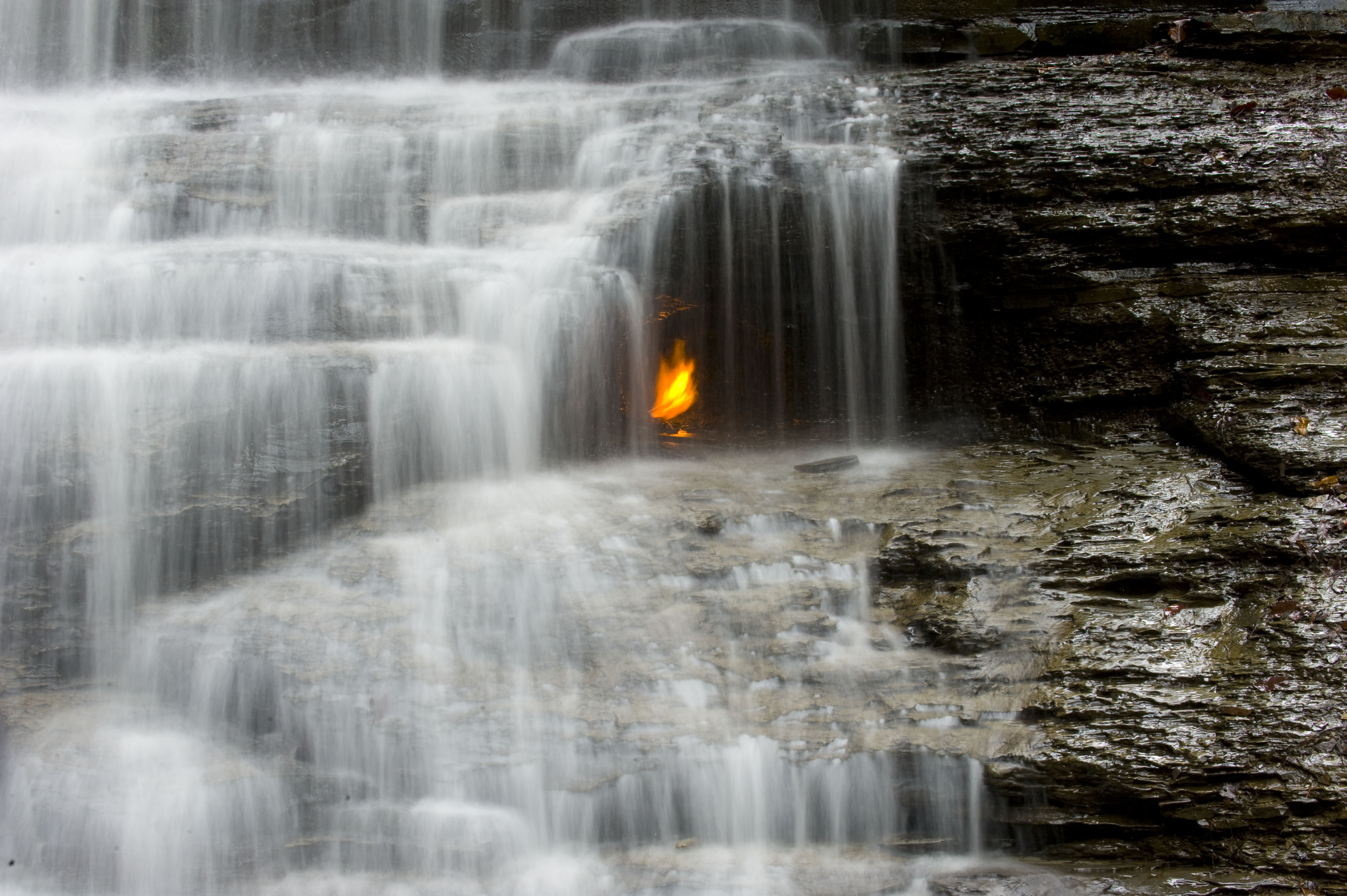
Eternal Flame Falls in New York has an eternal flame inside a small grotto behind the falls

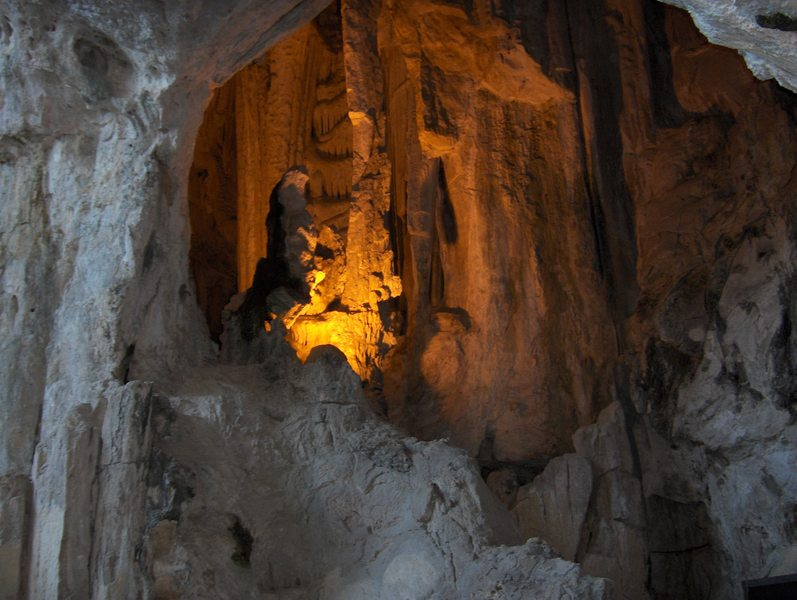
Grutas de García in Nuevo León, Mexico

A grotto or grot is a natural or artificial cave or covered recess. Naturally occurring grottoes are often small caves near water that are usually flooded or often flooded at high tide. Sometimes, artificial grottoes are used as garden features. The Grotta Azzurra at Capri and the grotto at Tiberius' Villa Jovis in the Bay of Naples are examples of popular natural seashore grottoes.

== Etymology ==
The word grotto comes from Italian grotta, Vulgar Latin grupta, and Latin crypta ("a crypt"). It is also related by a historical accident to the word grotesque. In the late 15th century, Romans accidentally unearthed Nero's Domus Aurea on the Palatine Hill—a series of rooms, decorated with designs of garlands, slender architectural framework, foliage, and animals. The rooms had sunk underground over time. The Romans who discovered this historical monument found it very strange, partly because it was uncovered from an "underworld" source. This led the Romans of that era to give it the name grottesca, from which came the French grotesque.

== Antiquity ==
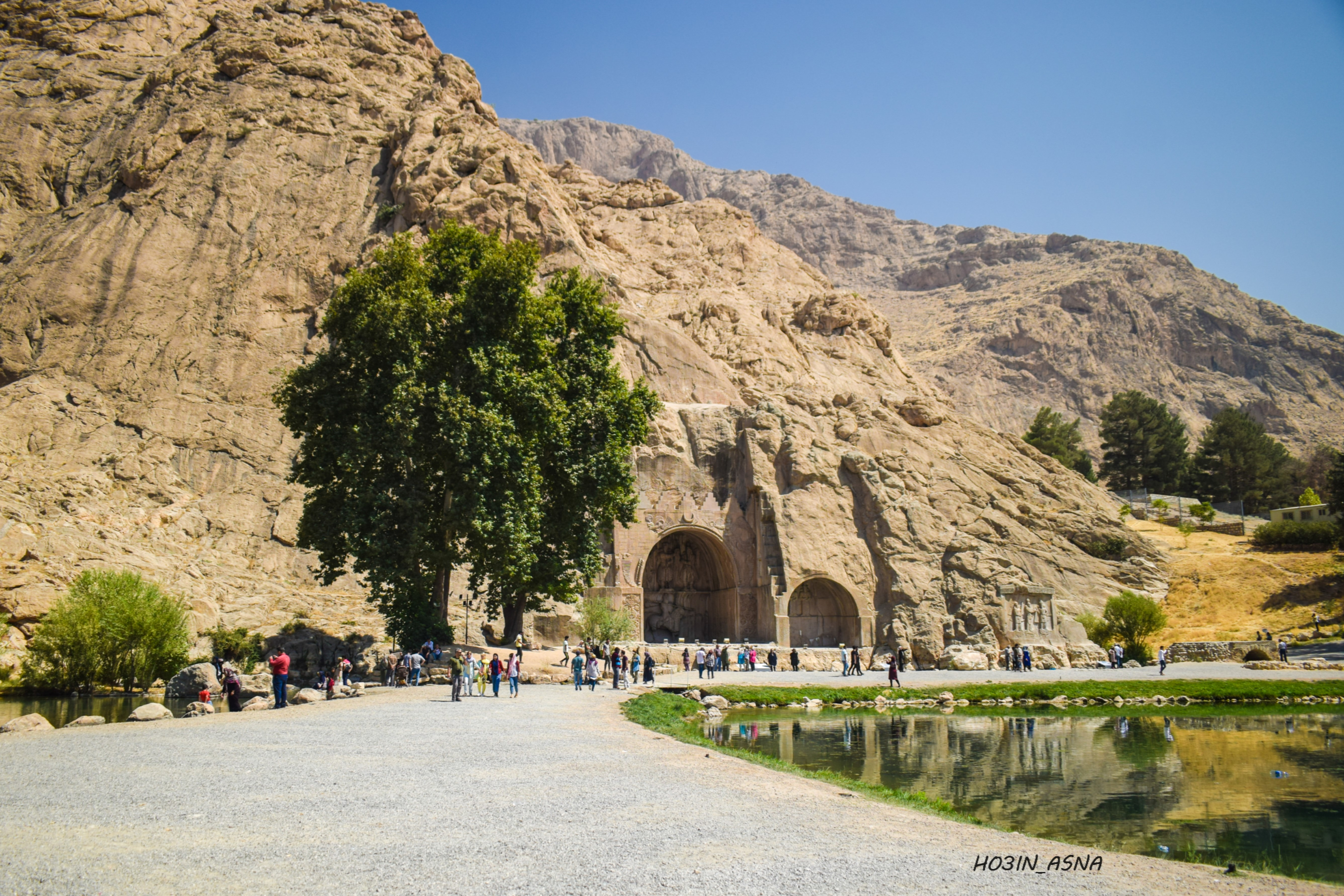
Two vaulted grottoes called Taq-e Bostan, located in Iran, Sassanian era

Grottoes were very popular in Greek and Roman culture. Spring-fed grottoes were a feature of Apollo's oracles at Delphi, Corinth, and Clarus. The Hellenistic city of Rhodes was designed with rock-cut artificial grottoes incorporated into the city, made to look natural. At the great Roman sanctuary of Praeneste south of Rome, the oldest portion of the primitive sanctuary was situated on the second lowest terrace, in a grotto in the natural rock where a spring developed into a well. According to tradition, Praeneste's sacred spring had a native nymph, who was honored in a grotto-like watery nymphaeum.

== Cellars in Ticino ==
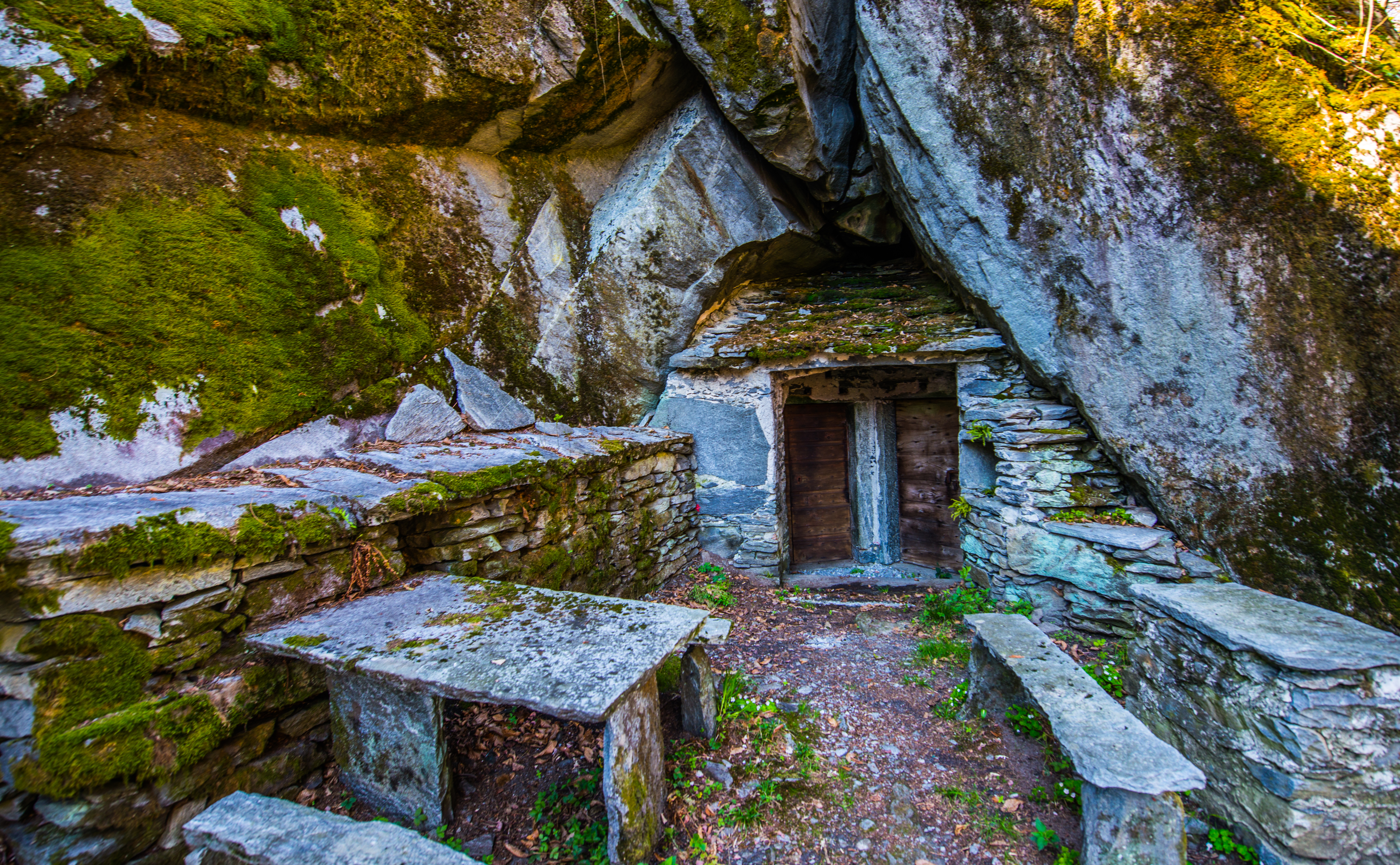
Grotto in Cevio

In Ticino, the Italian-speaking part of Switzerland, grottoes were places where wine and food were stored and preserved. They were built by exploiting the morphology of rocks and boulders, to create rooms with a cool climate suitable for food, particularly milk and cheese, as well as potatoes, sausages, and wine storage.

The importance of these cellars is demonstrated in their number; for example, there are 40 grotti in Maggia, no fewer in Moghegno, and about 70 in Cevio behind Case Franzoni. Some grotti have been opened to the public, as in Avegno, but most have lost their original character as they became rustic restaurants which serve basic local food and drink. A true grotto is dug out under a rock or between two boulders, where subterranean air currents keep the room cool. Often a grotto had a second floor with another one or two rooms for the fermentation cask and tools of the vintage. In front of the grotto were a table and benches of stone, where the farmers could rest and refresh themselves.

== Garden grottoes ==
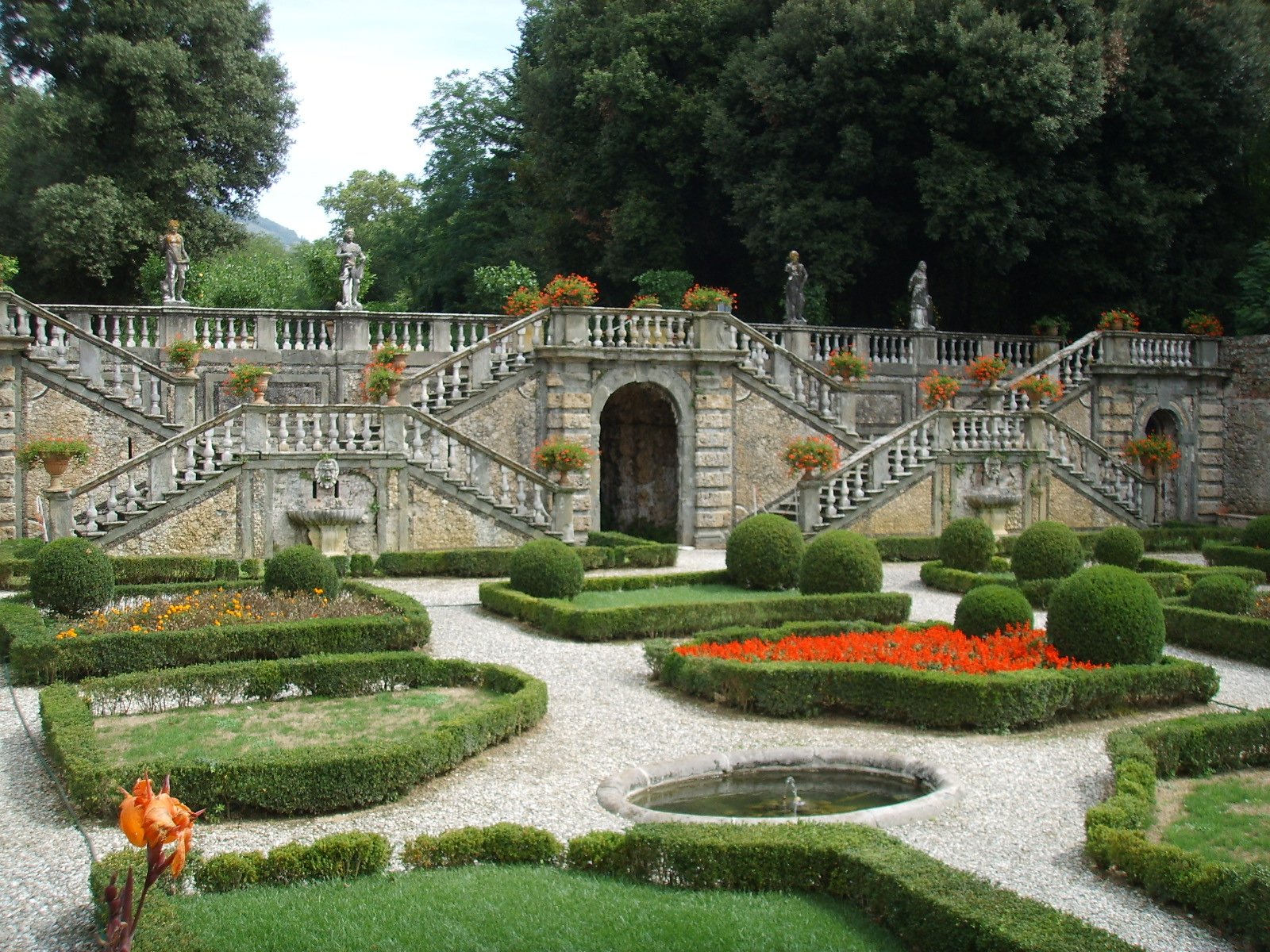
Grotto entrance, Villa Torrigiani

The popularity of artificial grottoes introduced the Mannerist style to Italian and French gardens of the mid-16th century. Two famous grottoes in the Boboli Gardens of Palazzo Pitti were begun by Vasari and completed by Ammanati and Buontalenti between 1583 and 1593. One of these grottoes originally housed the Prisoners of Michelangelo. Before the Boboli grotto, a garden was laid out by Niccolò Tribolo at the Medici Villa Castello, near Florence. At Pratolino, in spite of the dryness of the site, there was a Grotto of Cupid (surviving), with water tricks for the unsuspecting visitor. The Fonte di Fata Morgana ("Fata Morgana's Spring") at Grassina, not far from Florence, is a small garden building, built in 1573–74 as a garden feature in the extensive grounds of the Villa "Riposo" (rest) of Bernardo Vecchietti. It is decorated with sculptures in the Giambolognan manner.

The outsides of garden grottoes are often designed to look like an enormous rock, a rustic porch, or a rocky overhang. Inside, they are decorated as a temple or with fountains, stalactites, and imitation gems and shells (sometimes made in ceramic); herms and mermaids, mythological subjects suited to the space; and naiads, or river gods whose urns spilled water into pools. Damp grottoes were cool places to retreat from the Italian sun, but they also became fashionable in the cool drizzle of the Île-de-France. In the Kuskovo Estate, there is the Grotto Pavilion, built between 1755 and 1761.

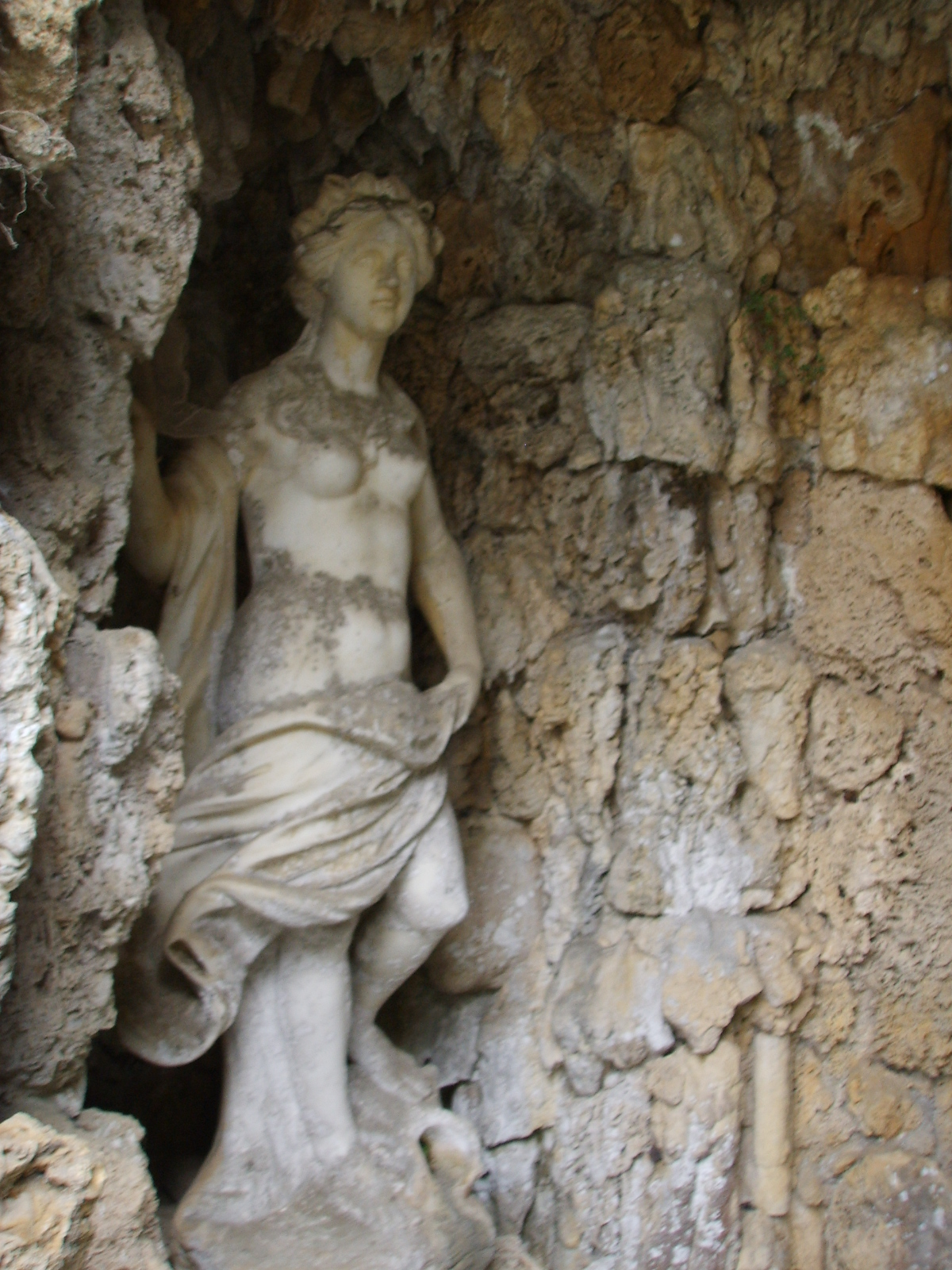
Sculpture in a grotto setting, Villa Torrigiani, Lucca

Grottoes could also serve as baths; an example of this is at the Palazzo del Te, in the 'Casino della Grotta', where a small suite of intimate rooms is laid out around a grotto and loggetta (covered balcony). Courtiers once bathed in the small cascade that splashed over the pebbles and shells encrusted in the floor and walls.

Grottoes have also served as chapels, or at Villa Farnese at Caprarola, a little theater designed in the grotto manner. They were often combined with cascading fountains in Renaissance gardens.

The grotto designed by Bernard Palissy for Catherine de' Medici's château in Paris, the Tuileries, was renowned. There are also grottoes in the gardens designed by André Le Nôtre for Versailles. In England, an early garden grotto was built at Wilton House in the 1630s, probably by Isaac de Caus.

Grottoes were suitable for less formal gardens too. Pope's Grotto, created by Alexander Pope, is almost all that survives of one of the first landscape gardens in England, at Twickenham. Pope was inspired after seeing grottoes in Italy during a visit there. Efforts are underway to restore his grotto. There are grottoes in the landscape gardens of Painshill Park, Stowe, Clandon Park, and Stourhead. Scott's Grotto is a series of interconnected chambers, extending 67 ft (20 metres) into the chalk hillside on the outskirts of Ware, Hertfordshire. Built during the late 18th century, the chambers and tunnels are lined with shells, flints, and pieces of colored glass. The Romantic generation of tourists might not actually visit Fingal's Cave, on the remote isle of Staffa in the Scottish Hebrides, but they have often heard of it, perhaps through Felix Mendelssohn's "Hebrides Overture", better known as "Fingal's Cave", which was inspired by his visit. In the 19th century, when miniature Matterhorns and rock gardens became fashionable, a grotto was often found, such as at Ascott House. In Bavaria, Ludwig's Linderhof contains an abstraction of the grotto under Venusberg, which is figured in Wagner's Tannhäuser.

Although grottoes have largely fallen from fashion since the British Picturesque movement, architects and artists occasionally try to redefine the grotto in contemporary design works. Such examples include Frederick Kiesler's Grotto of Meditation for New Harmony (1964), ARM'st post-modern Storey Hall (1995), Aranda/Lasch's Grotto Concept, (2005), DSDHA's Potters Field Park Pavilions (2008), Callum Moreton's Grotto pavilion (2010), and Antonino Cardillo's Grottoes series (2013–2016).

== Religious grottoes ==
Many Roman Catholics visit a grotto where Bernadette Soubirous saw apparitions of Our Lady of Lourdes. Numerous garden shrines are modeled after these apparitions. They can commonly be found displayed in gardens and churches, among other places (see Lourdes grotto).

The largest grotto is believed to be the Grotto of the Redemption in West Bend, Iowa.

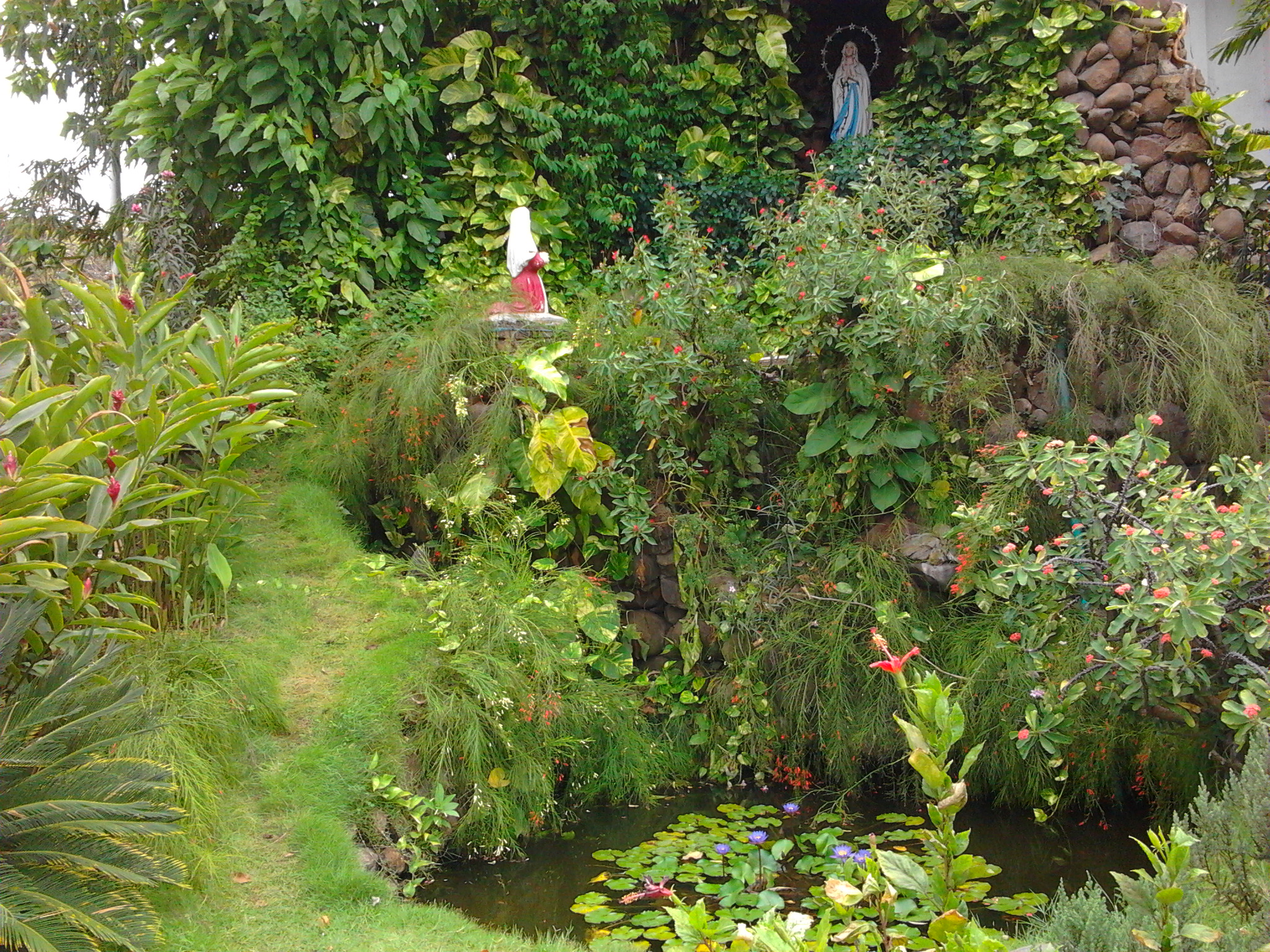
Marian grotto with a lily pond in San Thome Basilica, Chennai

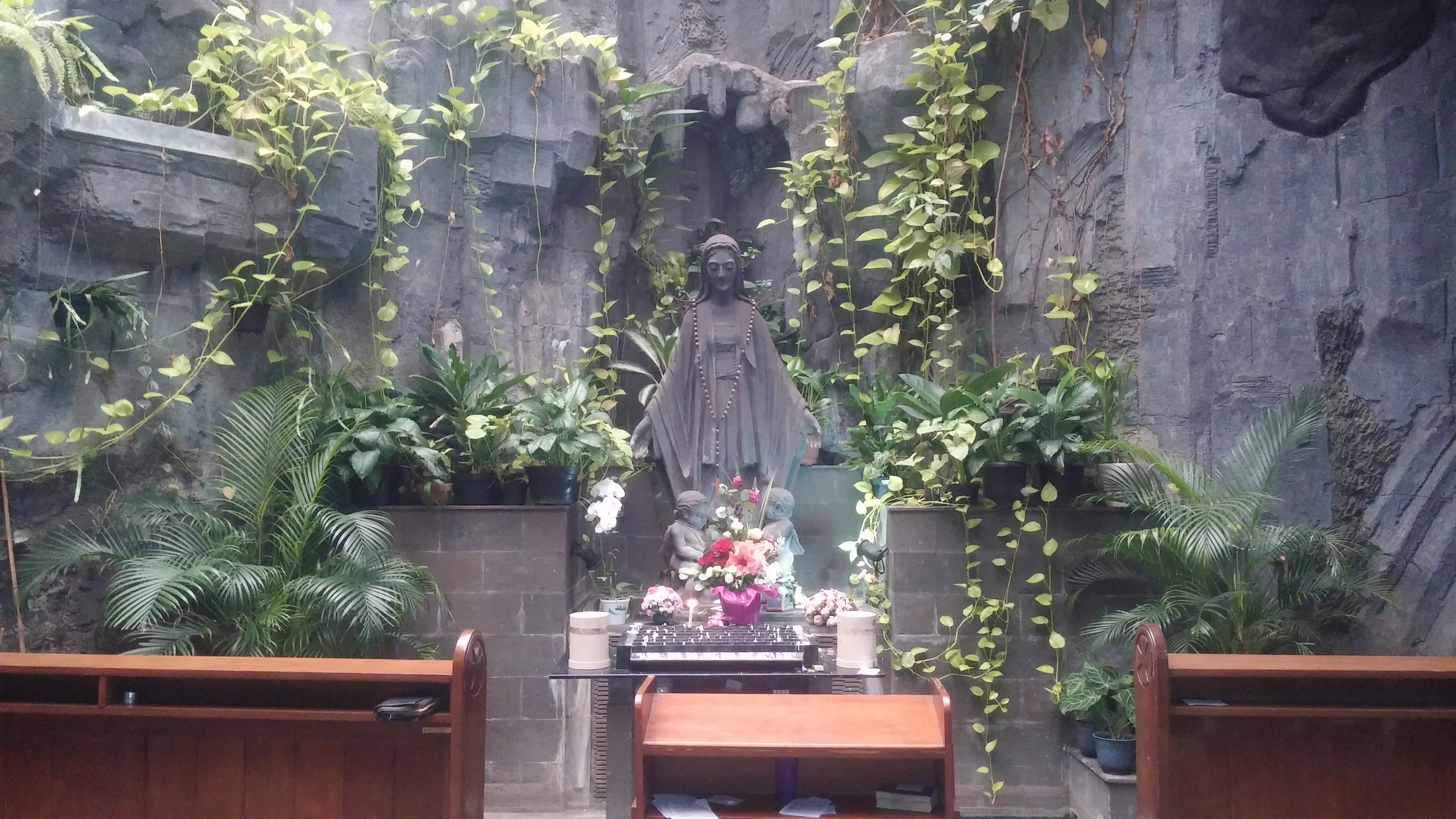
Modern Marian grotto at a church in Jakarta, Indonesia

Today, artificial grottoes are purchased and built for ornamental and devotional purposes. They are often used as shrines in which to place statues of saints, particularly the Virgin Mary, in outdoor gardens.

== Gallery ==
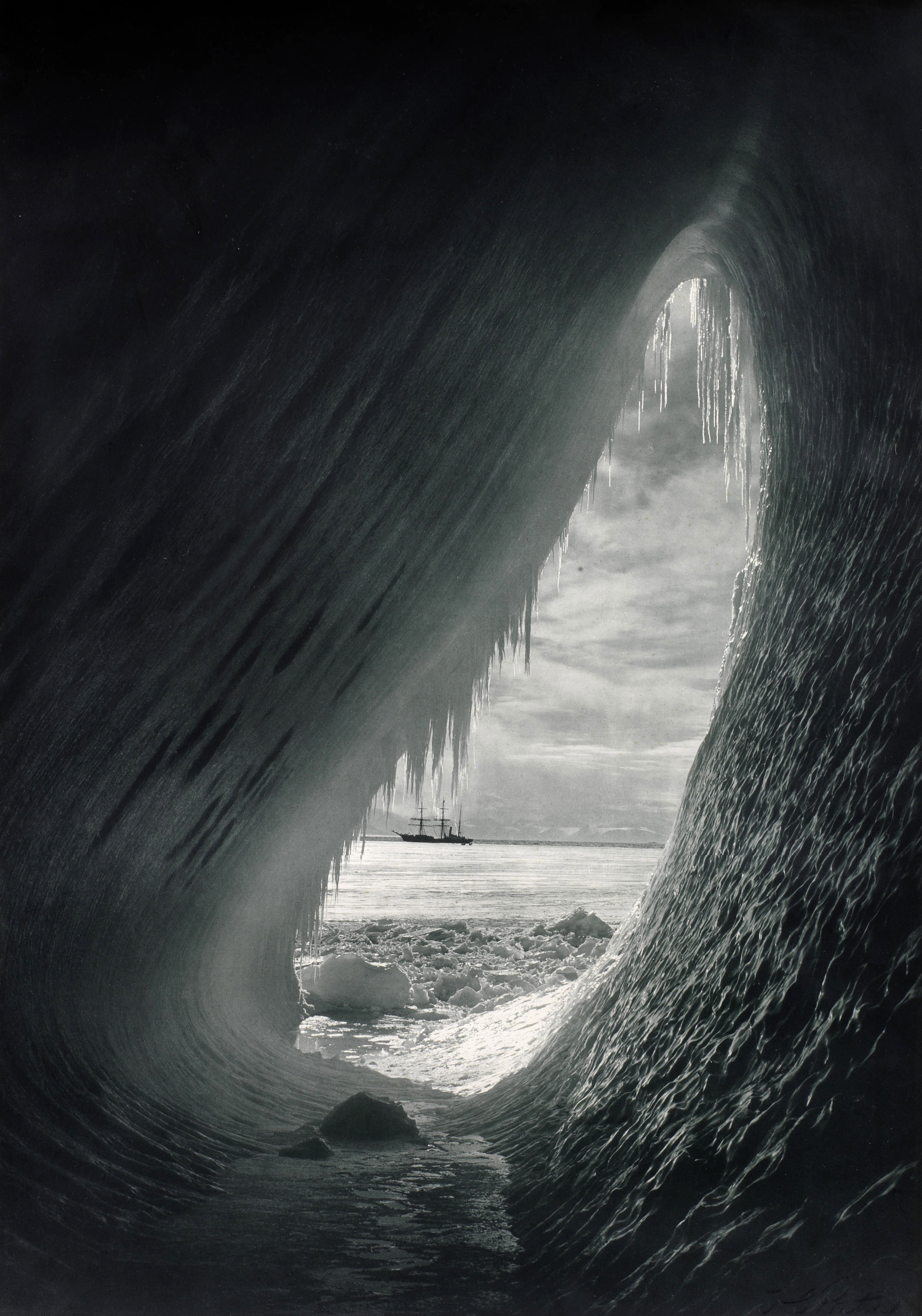
Grotto in an iceberg with the Terra Nova ship in the background (1911) during the 'British Antarctic Expedition' by Herbert G. Ponting

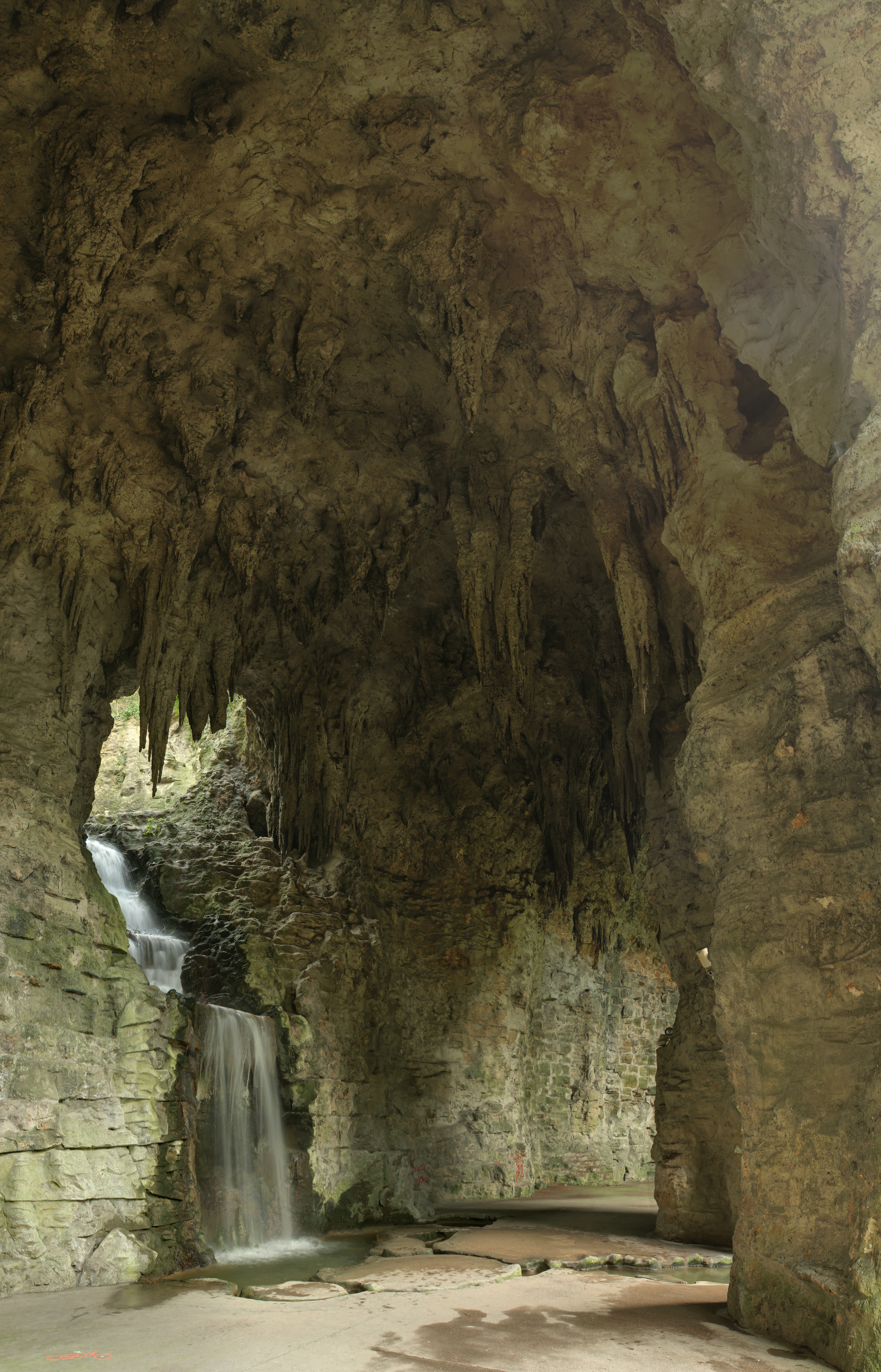
Grotto of the Buttes-Chaumont in Paris

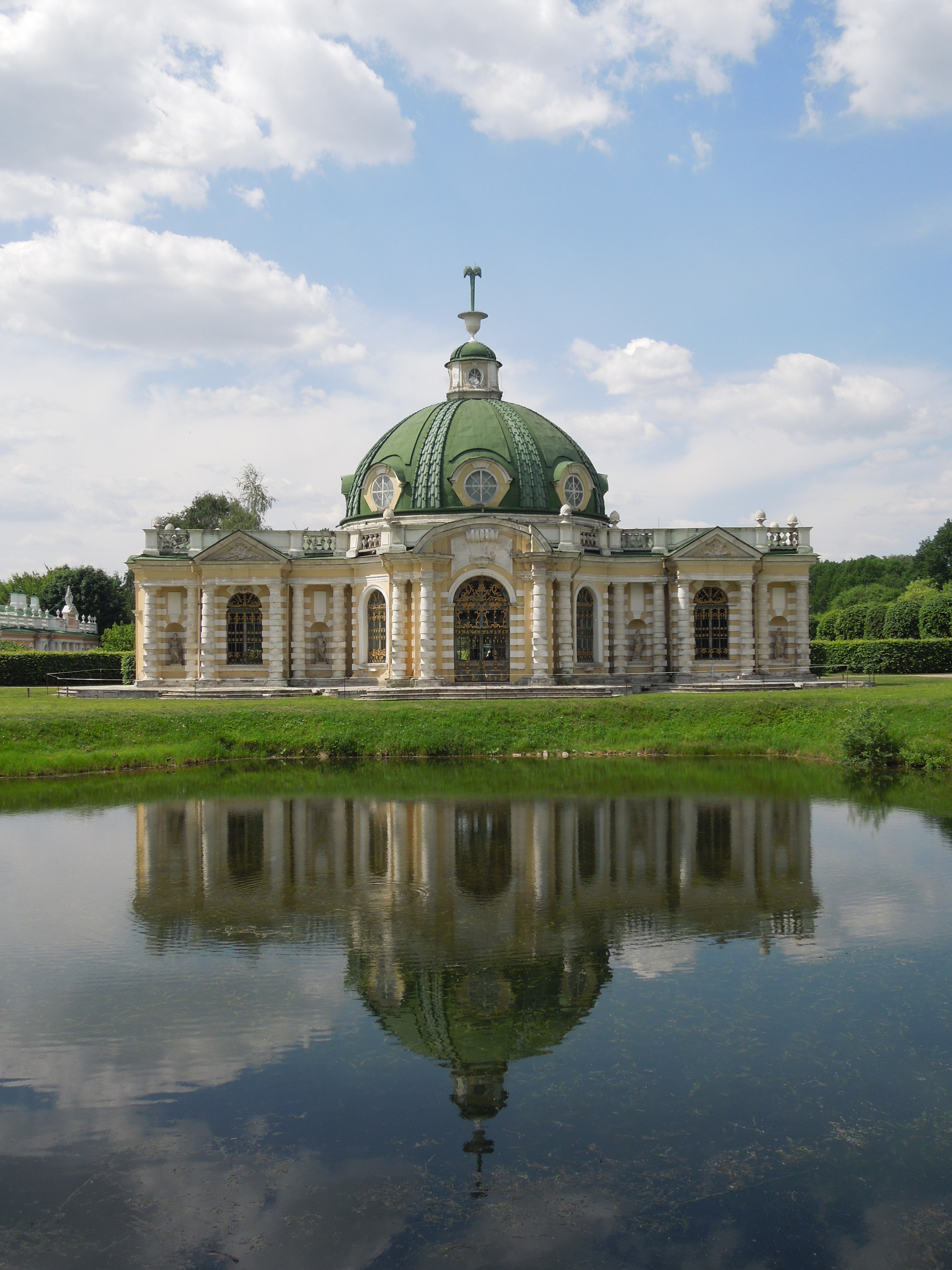
Grotto pavilion in Kuskovo, Moscow (1775)

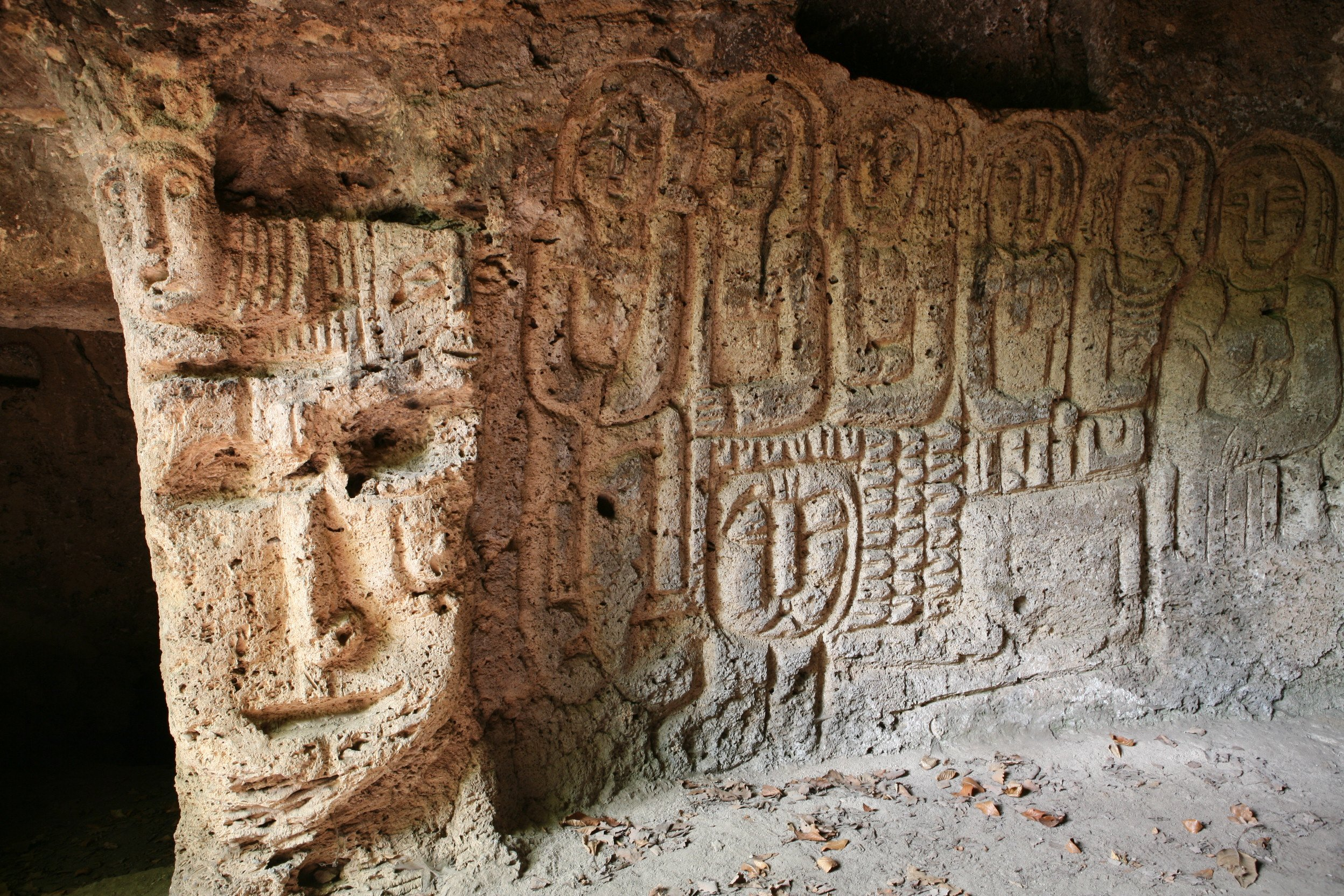
Anapat Grotto, Lastiver, Armenia

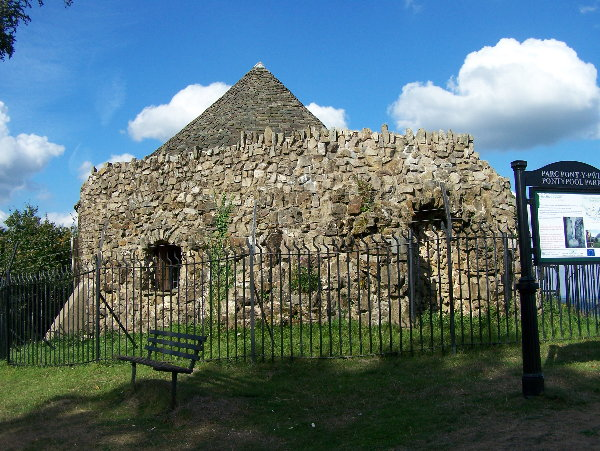
Shell Grotto, Wales

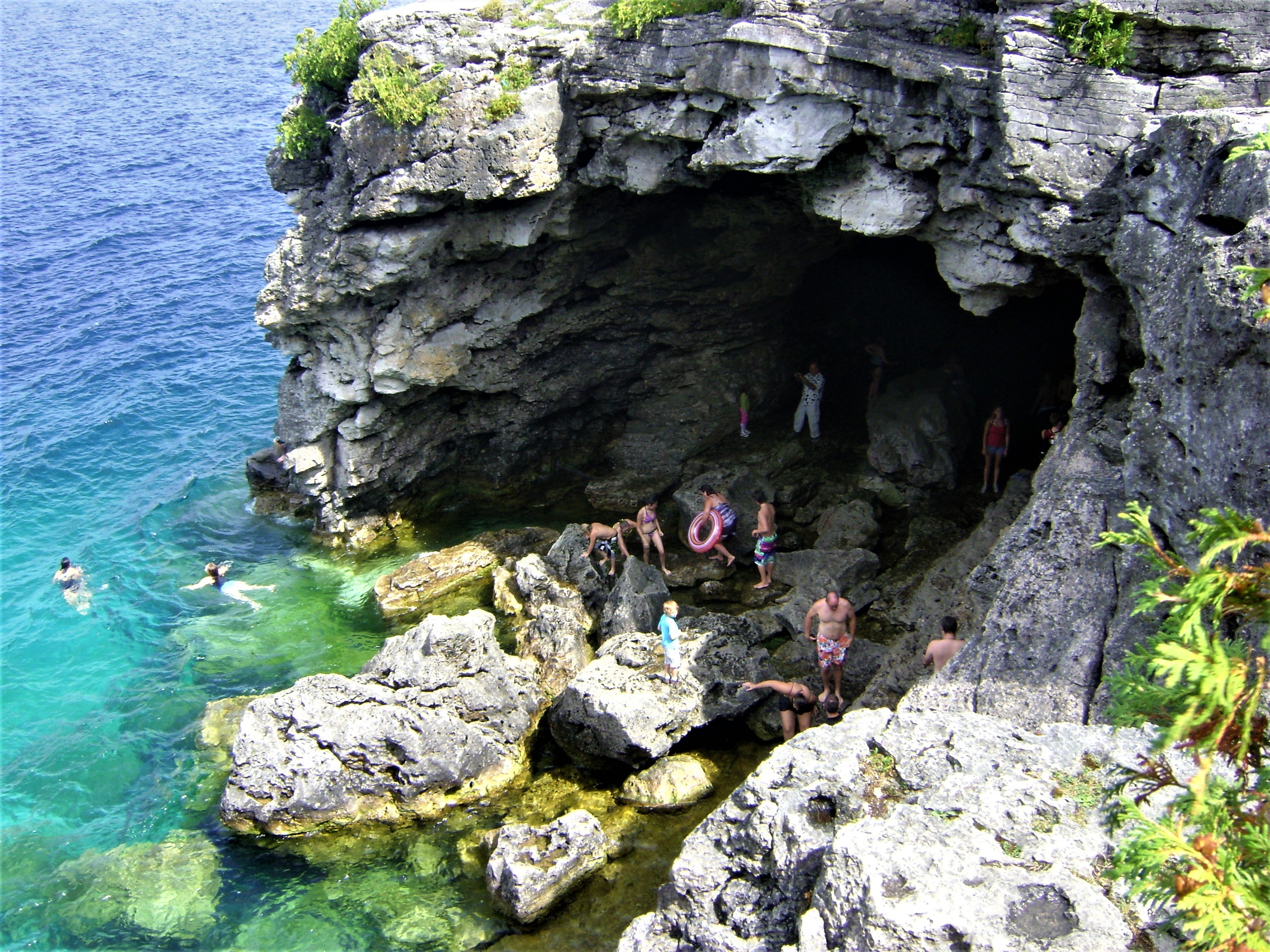
The Grotto in Bruce Peninsula National Park, Canada

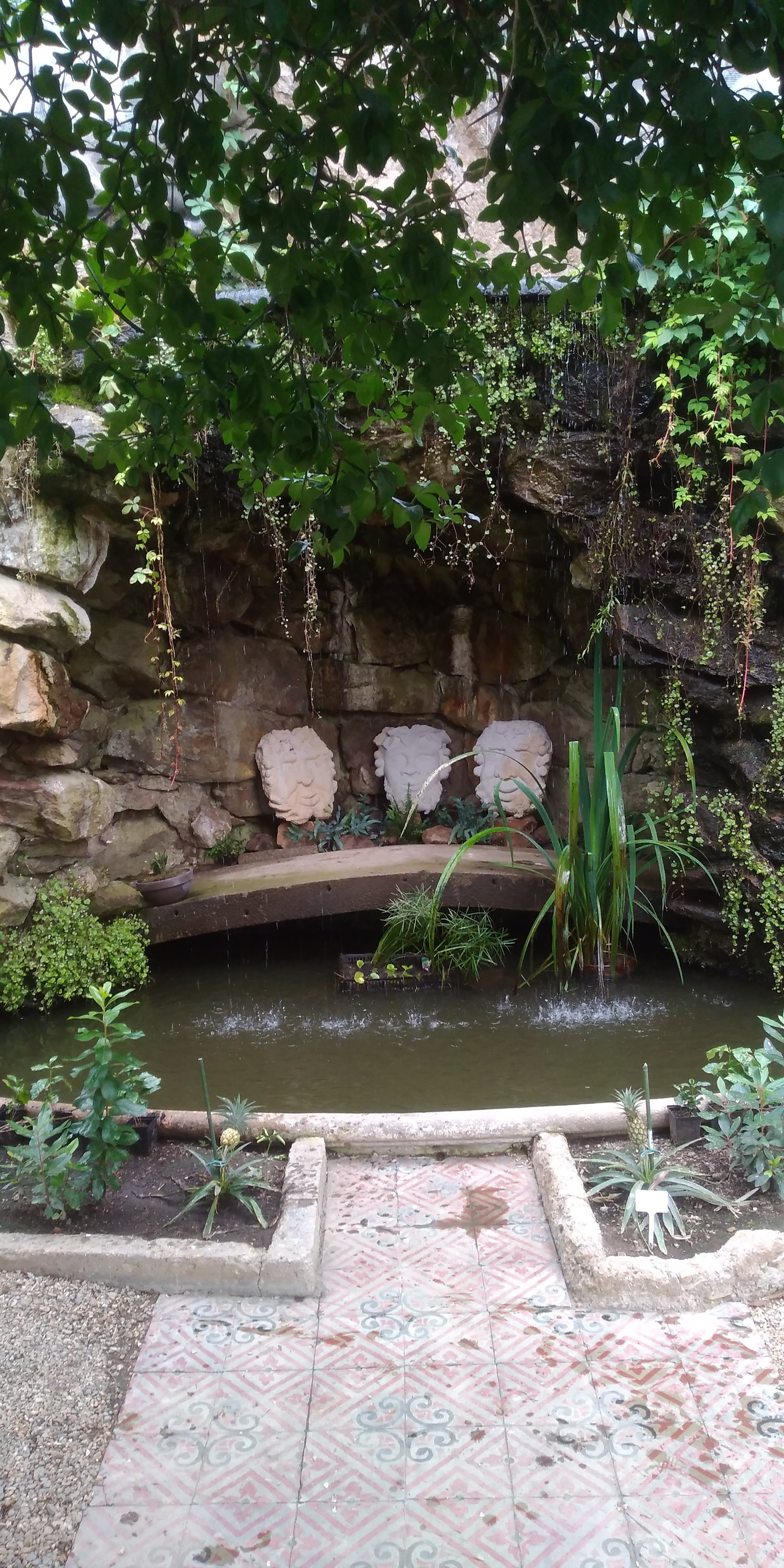
The grotto in the greenhouse of Světlá nad Sázavou Castle

== See also ==
- Cave
- Architecture of cathedrals and great churches
- Blue Grotto, former underground wine storage vaults in the anchorages under the Brooklyn Bridge, on the Manhattan side
- Caves of Hercules
- Grotto-heavens, Chinese religious usage associated with Daoist religion
- Karst
- Shell grotto
- Tunnels in popular culture
