= Fonte della Fata Morgana =

Coordinates: 43°43′54″N 11°16′43″E

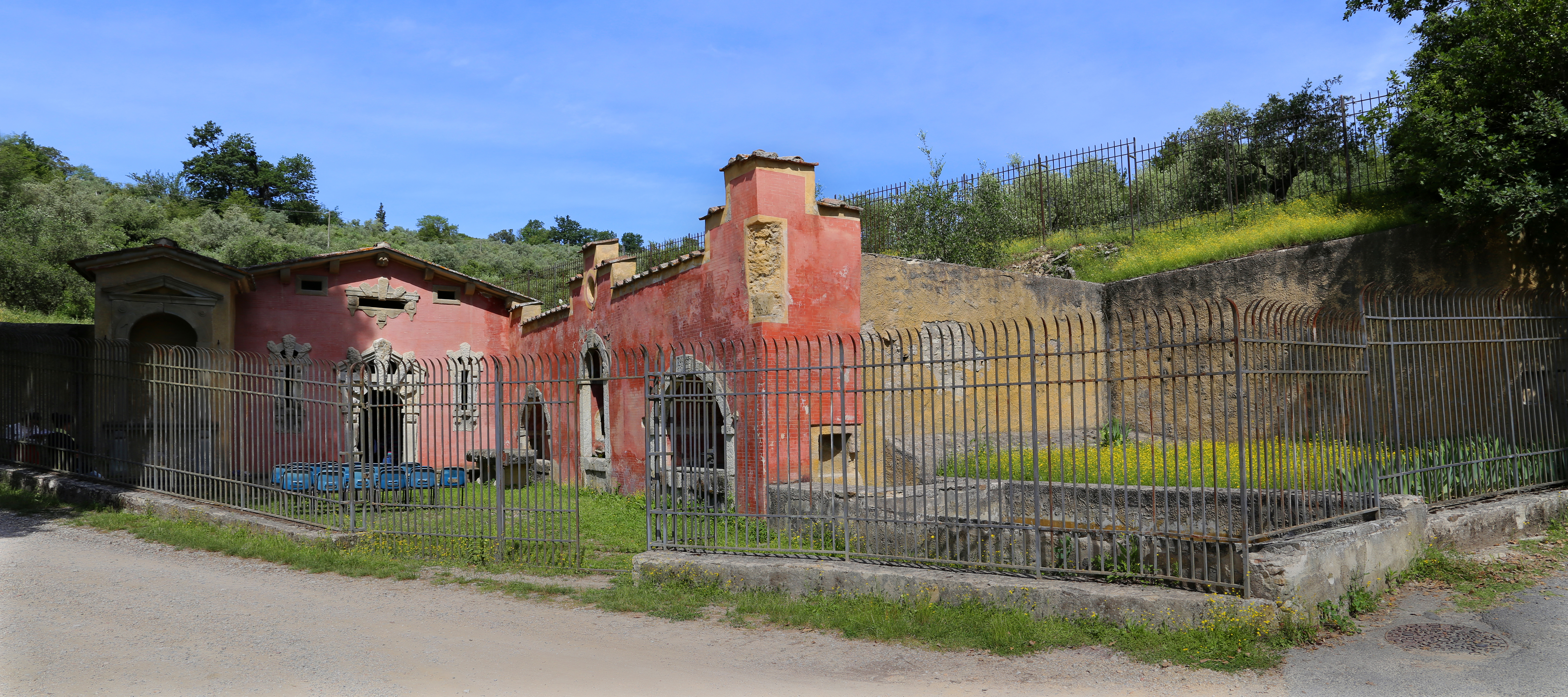
Fonte della Fata Morgana

The Fonte della Fata Morgana (Fountain of Fata Morgana), locally also called '"Casina delle Fate" (Little Fairy House), at Grassina, is a small garden building located not far from Florence, Italy, in the comune of Bagno a Ripoli. It was built in 1573–1574 as a garden feature in the extensive grounds of the Villa il Riposo of Bernardo Vecchietti on the slope of the hill called Fattucchia.

The Fonte della Fata Morgana at one time was enriched by sculptures, including a bust of Morgana by Flemish artist Giambologna in the nymphaeum, which is now in a private collection. The site has been under restoration and redevelopment since 2016.

It is among that group of artificial garden grottoes and nymphaeums made for private gardens, and less well known than those in the Boboli Gardens or the Medici villa at Pratolino.
