= John Scott of Amwell =

English Quaker poet and writer

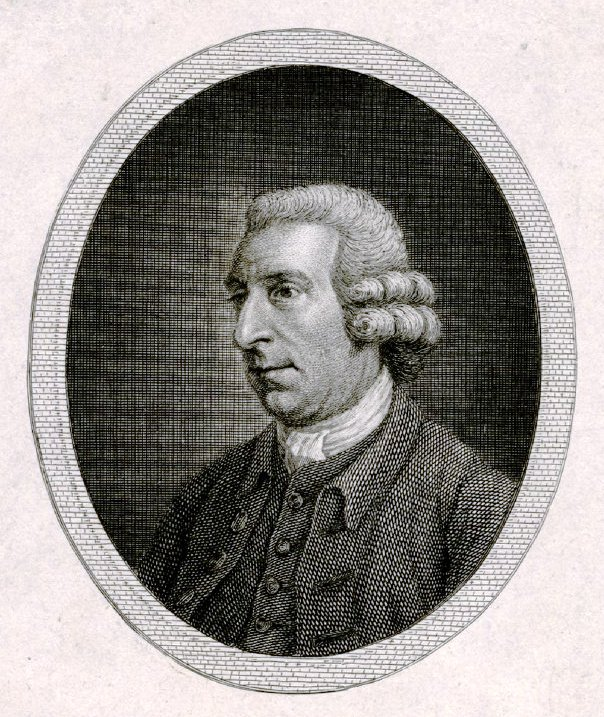
A portrait engraving for the title page of Scott's Poetical Works, 1782

John Scott (9 January 1731 – 12 December 1783), known as Scott of Amwell, was an English landscape gardener and writer on social matters. He was also the first notable Quaker poet, although in modern times he is remembered for only one anti-militarist poem.

== Life ==
John Scott was the son of a successful London draper who later retired to Amwell House in the Hertfordshire village of Great Amwell and worked from there as a maltster. The family were Quakers and John's elder brother Samuel (1719–88) eventually settled in Hertford as a Quaker minister. Scott stayed at home and undertook the improvement of the grounds from 1760, modelling them on those of William Shenstone at the Leasowes, which he visited. Its principal feature was a grotto consisting of six subterranean rooms whose surfaces were covered in flints, shells and minerals,

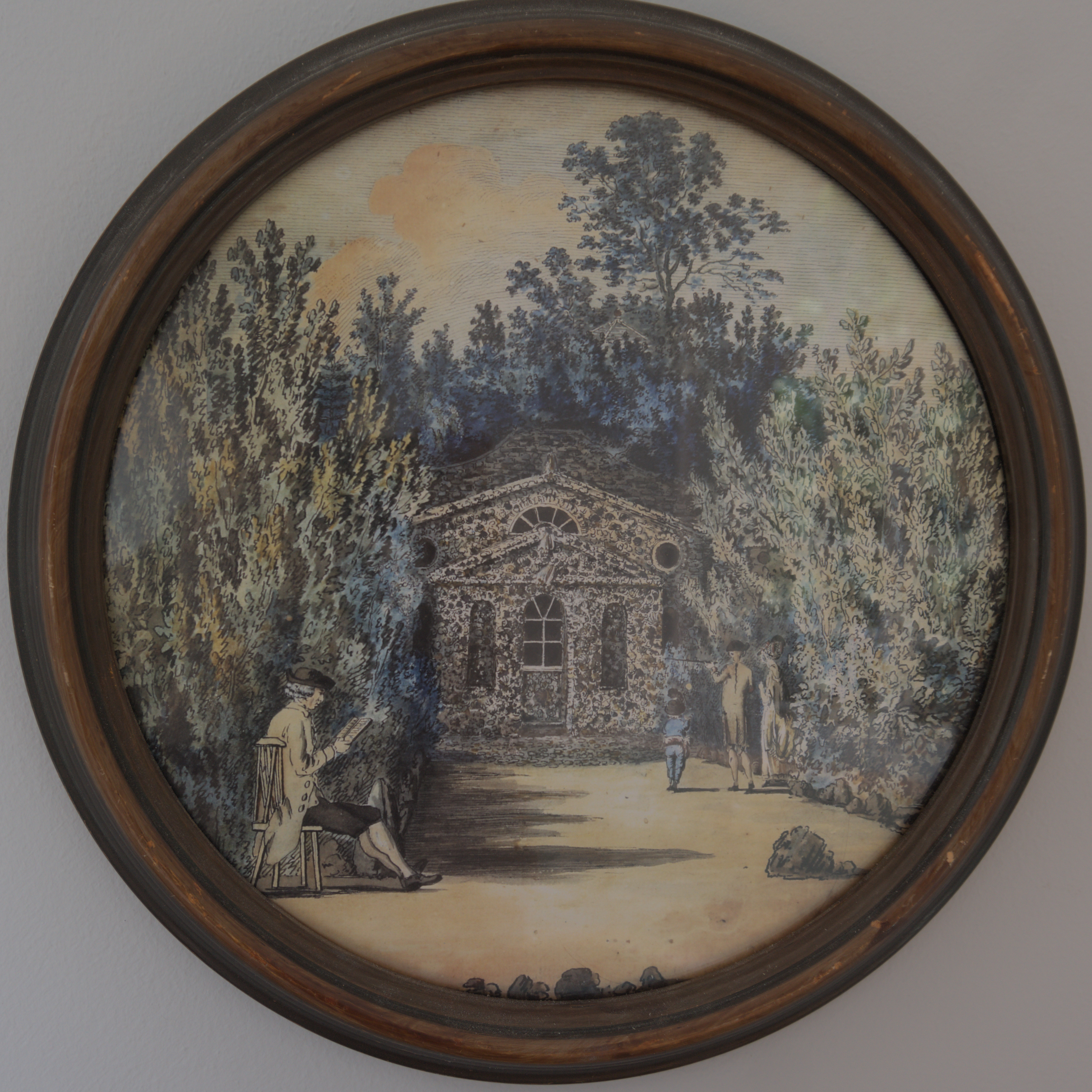
A contemporary engraving of Scott's Grotto at Amwell

Where glossy pebbles pave the varied floors,
And rough flint-walls are deck'd with shells and ores,
And silvery pearls, spread o'er the roofs on high,
Glimmer like faint stars in a twilight sky.

His poem "The Garden" goes on to reject the formal style of garden for Shenstone’s ideal of a managed wilderness. On visiting it, the celebrated Samuel Johnson declared that "none but a poet could have made such a garden." The grotto continued as a tourist attraction into Victorian times but, having then fallen out of use, was restored in 1991 as "the most complete of the grotto-builder’s art".

Scott lacked a full or satisfactory education and had only come to a knowledge of poetry through friendship with a bricklayer autodidact, whose daughter Sarah Frogley he eventually married in 1767. She died in childbirth the following year and in 1770 he married Maria De Horne, by whom he had a daughter, also named Maria. In 1773 he published his social Observations on the present state of the parochial and vagrant poor, a criticism of the Poor Law which was approved, although its recommendations did not gain parliamentary support. He was also celebrated as an expert on the turnpike roads, on which he wrote in 1773 and expanded in 1778 under the title A Digest of the Highway and General Turnpike Laws. He was an active member of three Hertfordshire turnpike trusts and his book was later praised as by "the ablest Turnpike Trustee of his time" Another political pamphlet, "The Constitution Defended", was a reply to Samuel Johnson’s "False Alarm" (1770).

Scott had been making occasional visits to London since 1760 and there made the acquaintance of John Hoole, who introduced him to Dr Johnson. Though they disagreed politically, Johnson remarked that "he loved Mr Scott" and meant to write his life, although death intervened before he could do so. Scott himself died of a fever caught during a visit to London in 1783. After his death his Critical essays on several English poets was published in 1785, together with a life of him written by John Hoole. These had originated from Scott's dissatisfaction with some of the essays in Johnson’s recent Lives of the Most Eminent English Poets and was meant to supply a corrective view.

== Poetry ==
Scott’s preferred method of composing poetry was described by Hoole as taking place after the rest of the family were in bed, when "it was frequently his custom to sit in a dark room, and when he had composed a number of lines, he would go into another room where a candle was burning, in order to commit them to paper." His earliest published works outside of magazines were the “Four Elegies descriptive and moral” (1760). In the fashion of Gray's Elegy, these record the passing of the seasons rather than an individual and were written in cross-rhymed quatrains. Such writing was not to the taste of Dr Johnson who, when Boswell urged that Scott was “a very middle-rate poet, who pleased many readers”, argued that only excellence was admirable. Afterwards it was not until 1776 that Scott published “Amwell, a descriptive poem” in blank verse that takes the almost Wordsworthian stance that the countryside with which he became acquainted “in early youth… gave rapture to my soul; and often still on life’s calm moments sheds serener joy.” It was after this poem that he became known as Scott of Amwell in the 18th century.

Later he published his “Moral Eclogues” (1778), followed soon after by his collected Poetical Works (1782), which was to be reprinted in 1786 and 1795 and later included in omnibus volumes in 1808 and 1822. The portrait prefixed to his works is not a correct likeness and caused Scott dissatisfaction. Among several other illustrations in the body of the book were two vignettes and two oval plates by the young William Blake.

Particular itemisation is one facet of Scott's style, avoiding the generalised Augustan diction of earlier poets:

There spread the wild rose, there the woodbine twin'd;
There stood green fern, there o'er the grassy ground
Sweet camomile and ale-hoof spread around;
And centaury red, and yellow cinquefoil grew,
And scarlet campion and cyanus blue;
And tufted thyme, and marjoram's purple bloom,
And ruddy strawberries yielding rich perfume.

There is a wide range of literary and geographical reference as well. Two poems respond to the work of Mark Akenside and there is a sonnet on Shenstone’s elegies. The “Mexican Prophecy” is set at the time of the Spanish conquest of the Aztec Empire and in his “Oriental Eclogues” Scott follows the example of William Collins by writing three set in Arabia, India and China. The last of these deals with the historical poet Li Po.

He protested in his Letter to the Critical Reviewers that not all his poems were included in the Poetical Works. Twelve unpublished poems are among his papers at the Friends' Library or in other letters to friends. They include four long odes and four sonnets, numbered V-VIII, which he may have planned to include in a cooperative volume with Joseph Cockfield.

The poem by which Scott is most remembered now is “The Drum” (Ode 13), an anti-war poem beginning “I hate that drum’s discordant sound” which was widely reprinted after its publication. In England it was set as a vocal piece by Benjamin Frankel as part of his “8 Songs” (Op. 32, 1959), and later by Christopher Dowie. In the 21st century it has been set to music by the Quaker composer Ned Rorem as the opening piece in his song cycle "Aftermath" (2001), an immediate pacifist reaction to the vengeful spirit that followed the attacks of 9/11. There was also a later US setting for choir and snare drum by William F. Funk in 2004, and in Canada it was set by Robert Rival as the sixth in his cycle "Red Moon and other songs of war" (2007).

== Sources ==
- John Scott of Amwell (1956) Lawrence D. Stewart
- Scott of Amwell, Dr. Johnson's Quaker Critic (2001) David Perman
- Scott's letters at the Friends' Library, London (Dimsdale MSS)
