= Shell Grotto, Nienoord =

Shell grotto in Nienoord, Leek, Netherlands

Coordinates: 53°10′00″N 6°23′41″E

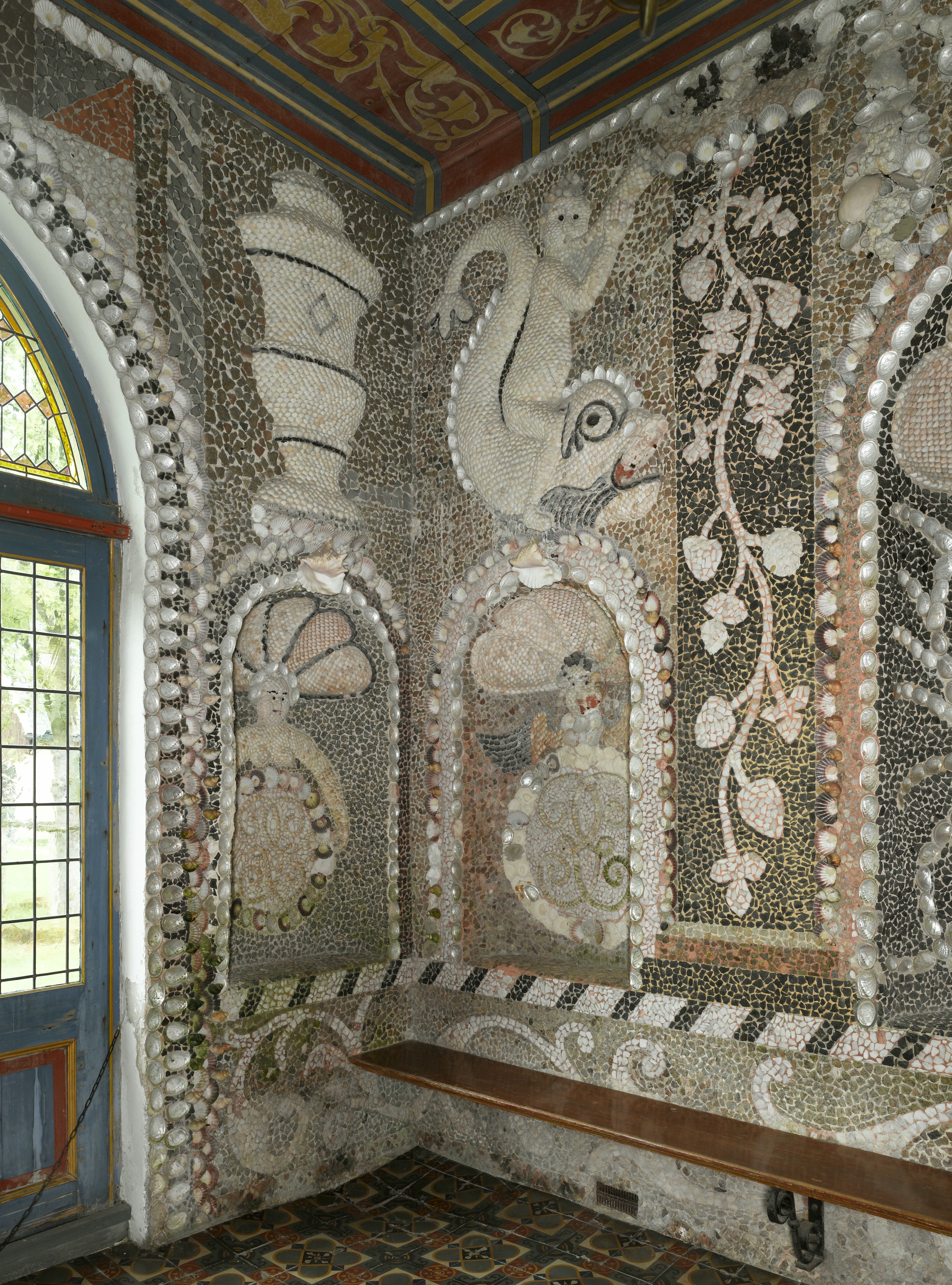
Detail of the Shell Grotto, Nienoord, in a rectangular wooden pavilion.

The Shell Grotto Nienoord (Dutch: Schelpengrot) is a shell grotto built around the year 1700 at the behest of Anna van Ewsum, in a cupola in the southern gardens of the former borg on the Nienoord estate in Leek, in the northeastern Netherlands.

The grotto was originally built as a treasury for the jonkheers of Nienoord. All that is known about the reason for covering the cupola's interior in shells, comes from a folk tale.

A girl from the village of Leek was working at the castle. She was very curious about the castle's treasury. So one day, when the jonkheer and his wife were on a trip, she asked the jonkheer's daughter whether she could take a look at the treasury. Persuaded, the daughter opened the treasury to the girl. She found it lovely and danced through the room. Quickly, her master's daughter had had enough of waiting and walked off, closing the treasury's door behind her. She forgot about the girl, leaving her locked up. When the jonkheer returned home, he discovered the girl, and punished her by locking her up indefinitely in the treasury. She would only be released once she had covered all the walls in shells. For decades, the girl toiled on, piecing together the mosaic. After she had finished her work, she was let out. Happy to be free once more, she ran towards the village, where, at her arrival, she looked at herself in the clear water. She was so shocked by the sight of her old, haggard face, that she collapsed never to get up again.

This is not the only shell grotto in the Netherlands. Others can be found on the Rosendael Caste estate (Rozendaal, Gelderland, built in 1722) and in Het Loo Palace (Apeldoorn, Gelderland).

== Gallery ==
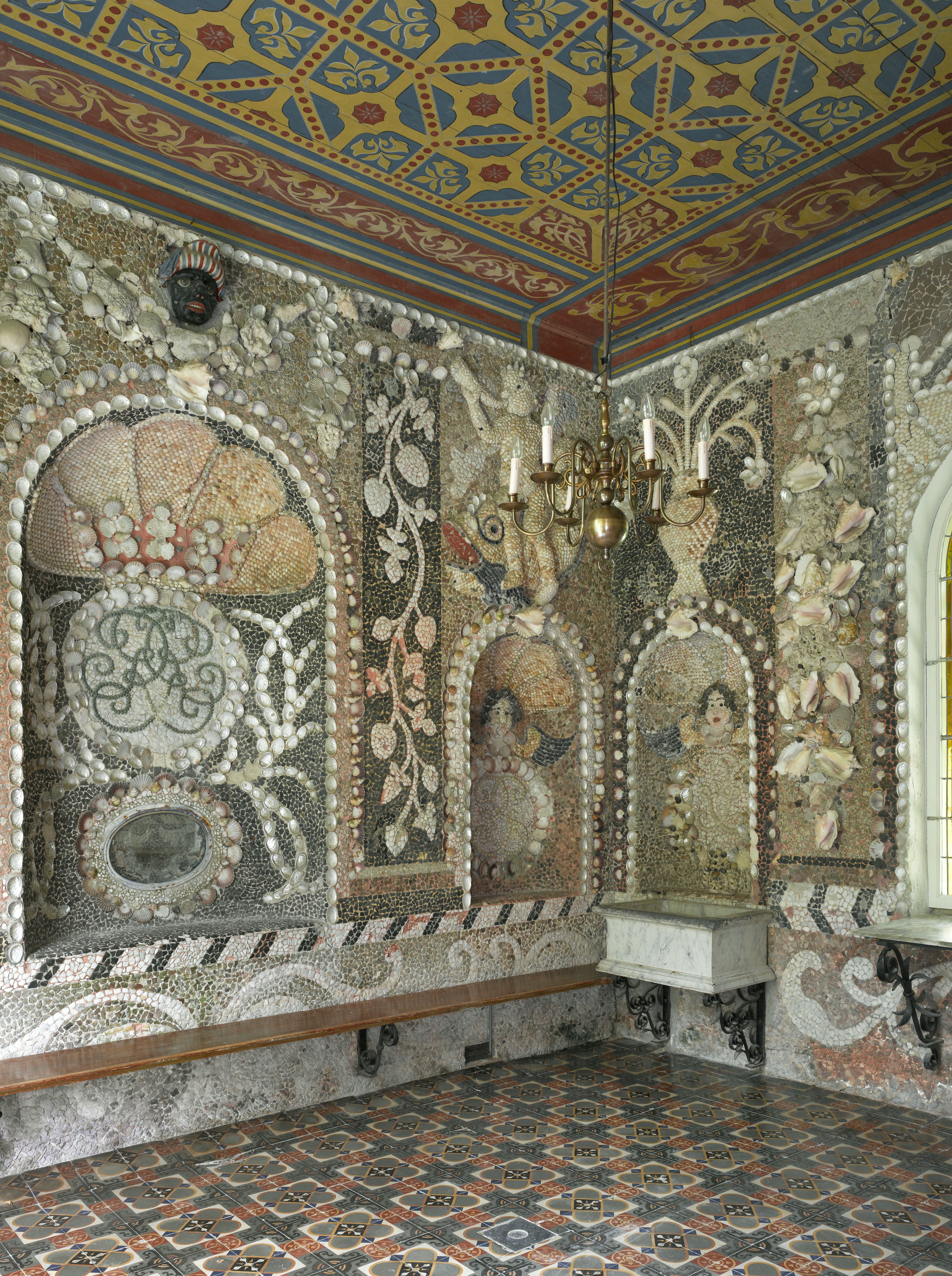

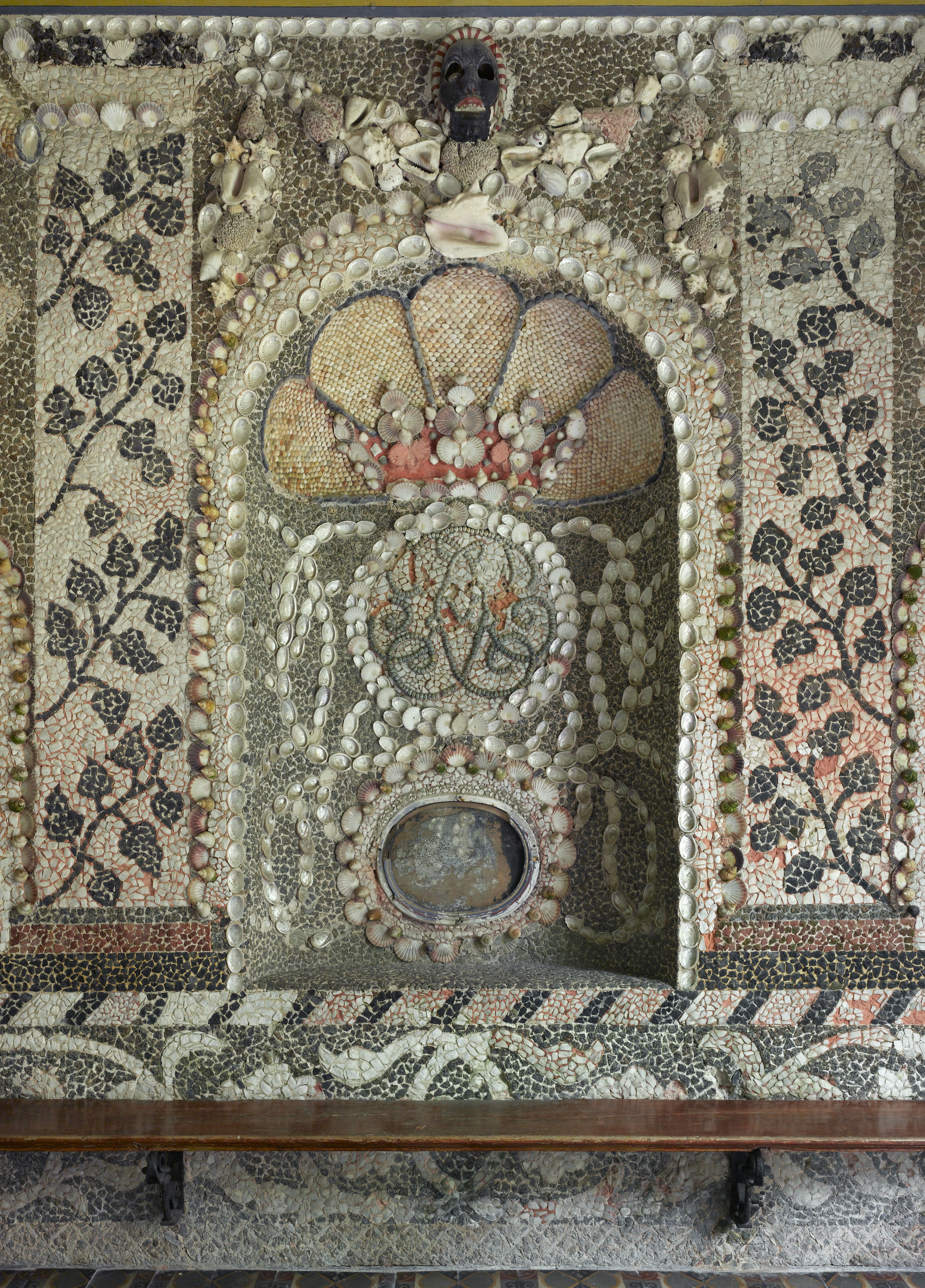

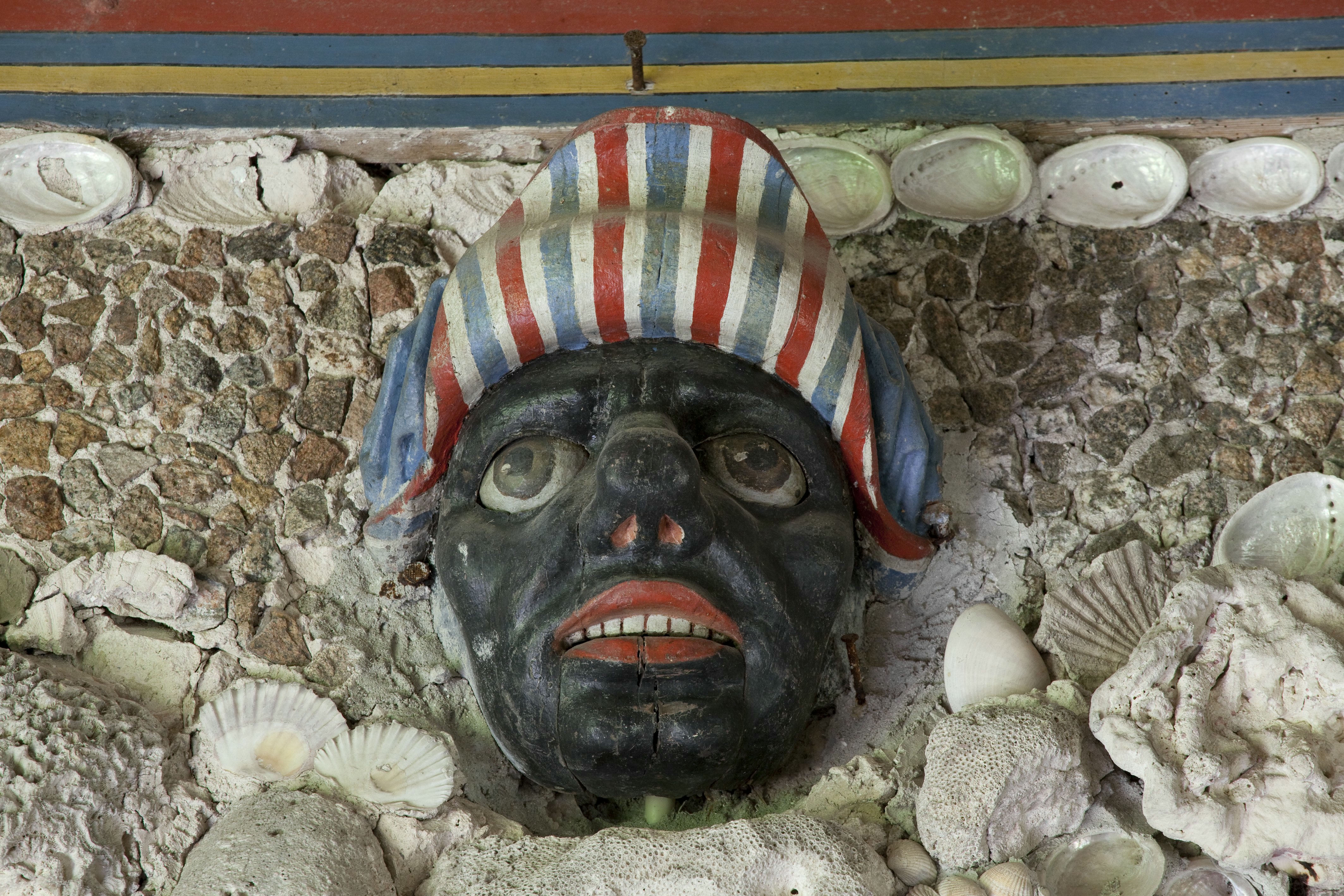

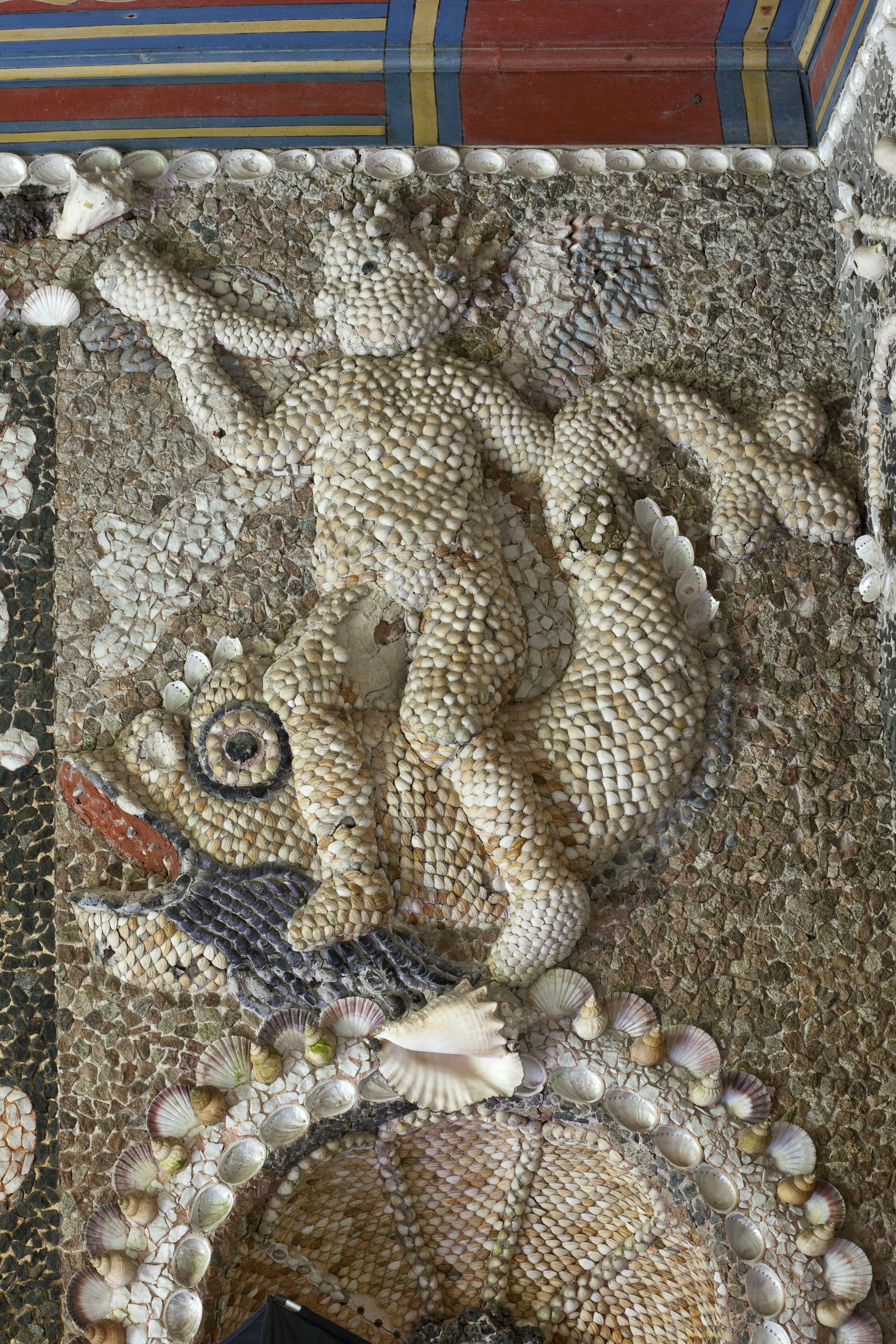

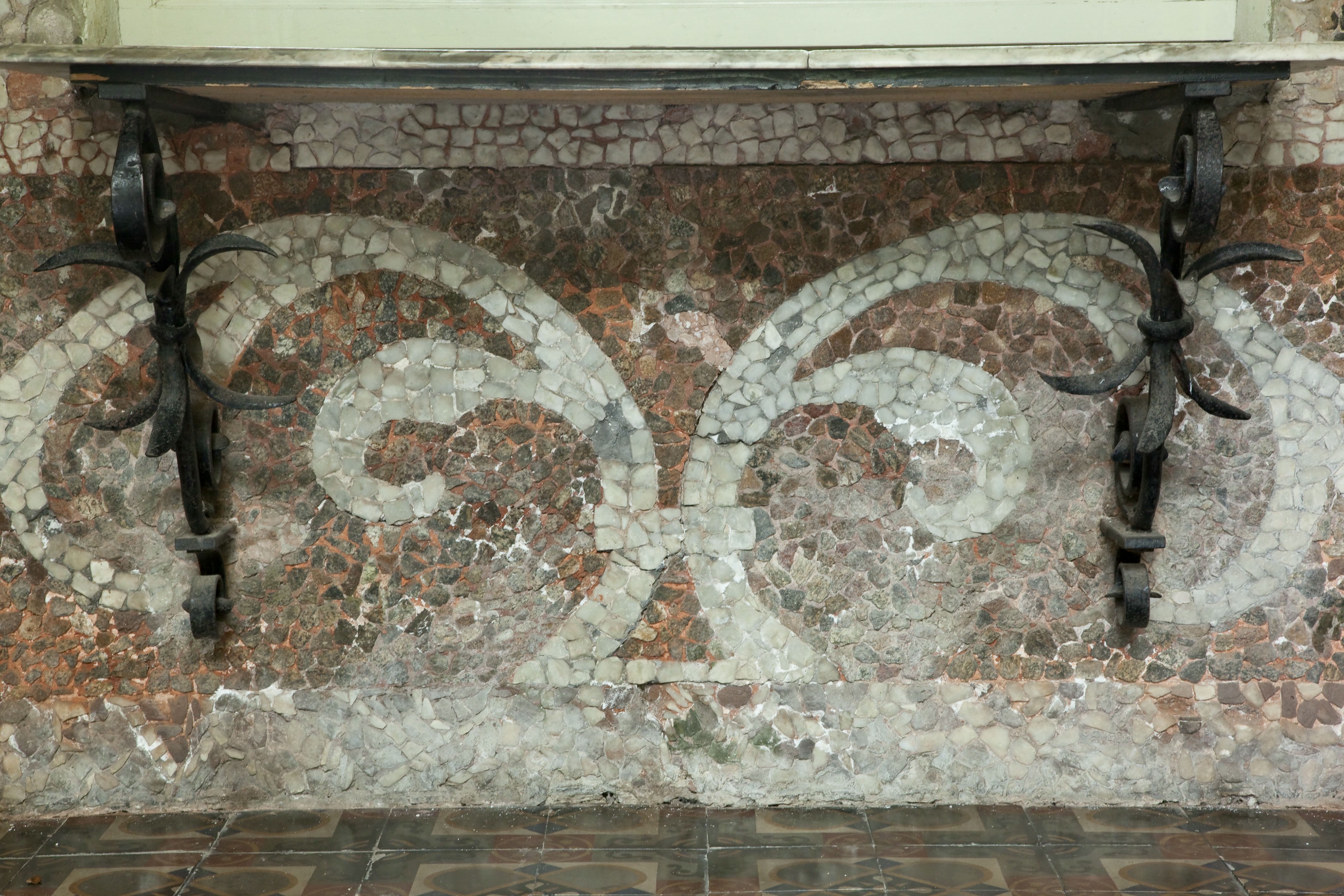

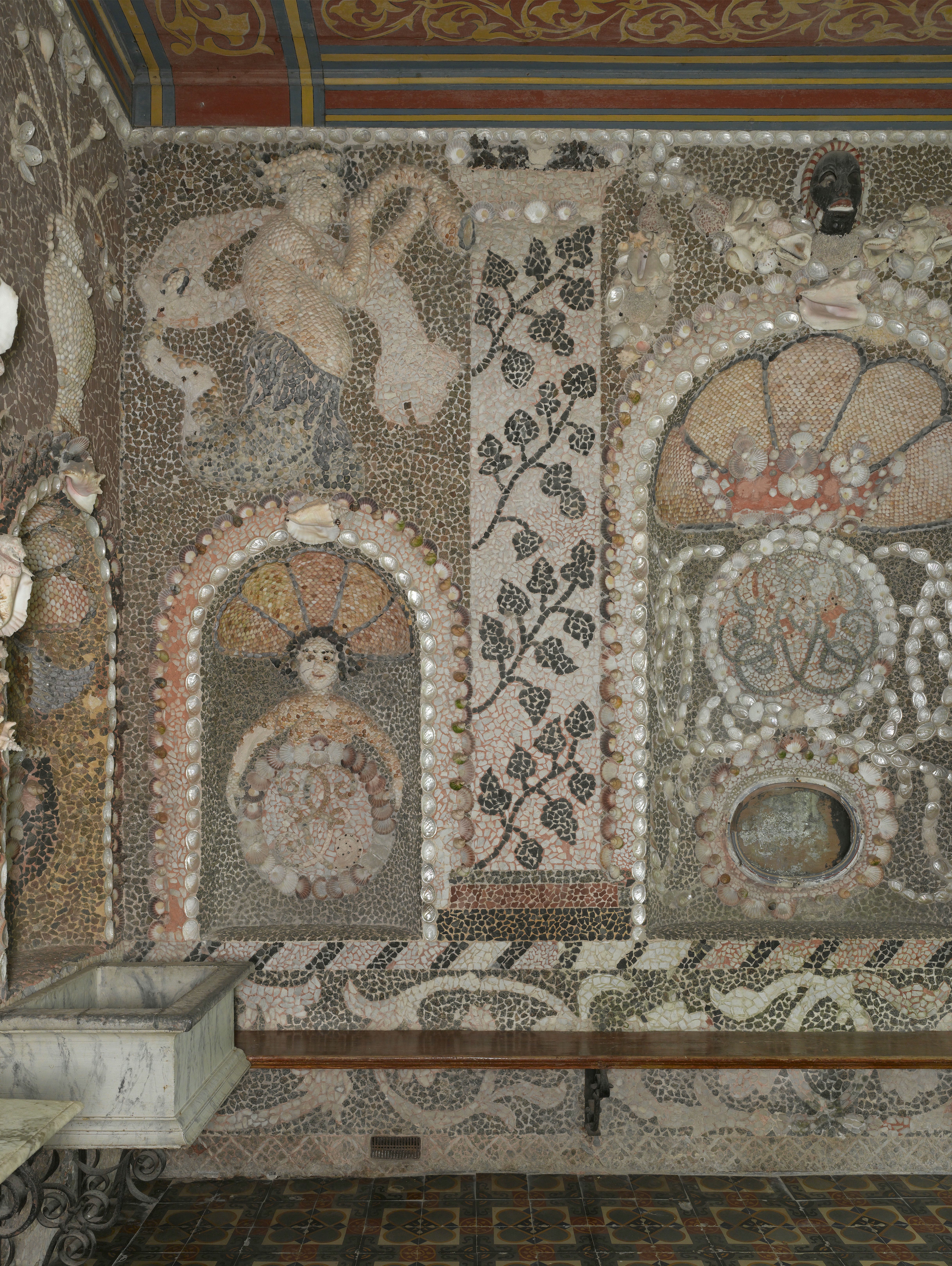

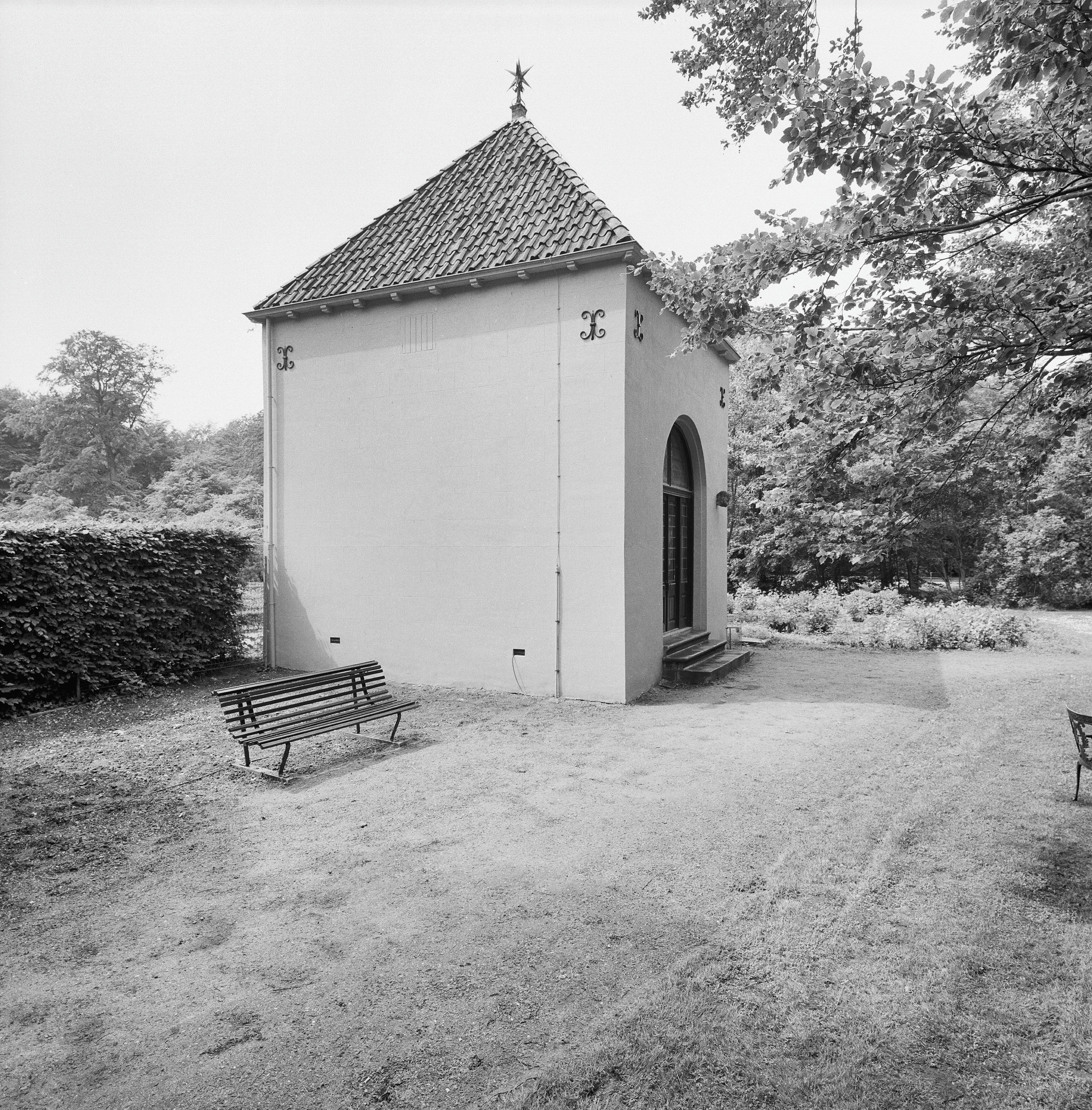
