= Shell grotto =

Architectural folly decorated with seashells

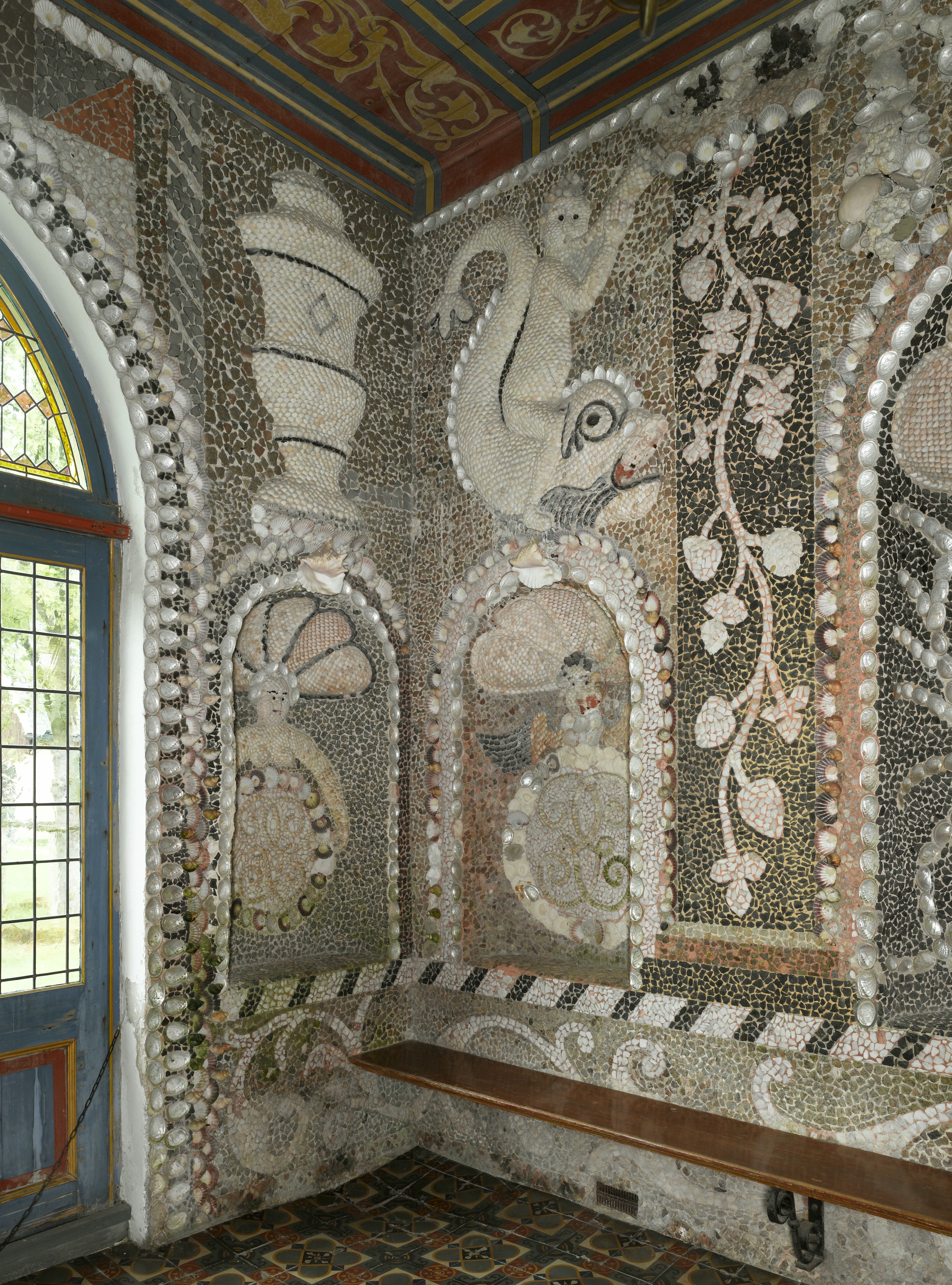
Detail of the Shell Grotto, Nienoord, Netherlands, in a rectangular wooden pavilion, c. 1700

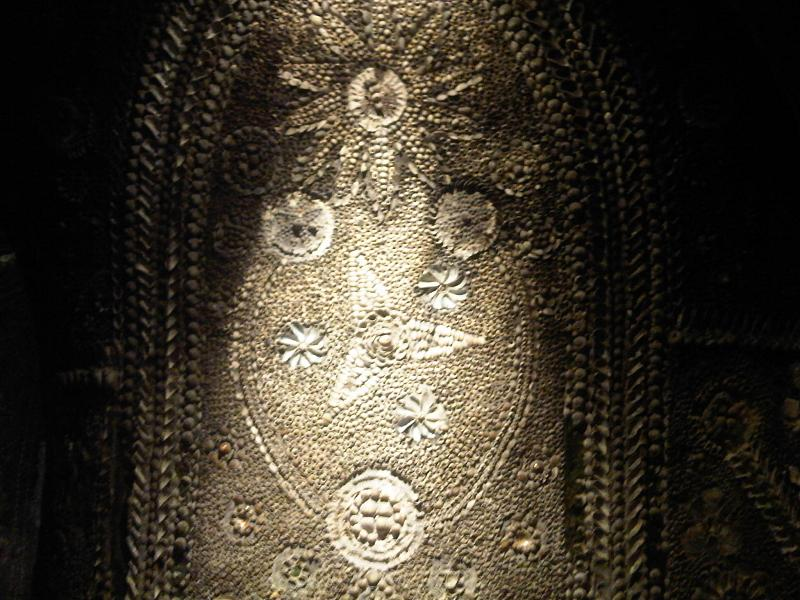
Part of the Shell Grotto in Margate

A shell grotto is a type of folly, a grotto decorated with sea shells. The shell grotto was a popular feature of many British country houses in the 17th and 18th centuries. It suited the Baroque and Rococo styles (which used swirling motifs similar to sea shells) and often represented the mimicry of architectural features from the Italian Renaissance (themselves copies from Classical times). The idea of a grotto was originally a means to enhance a dank undercroft, or provide an antechamber before a piano nobile, but later it became a garden feature independent of the house, sometimes on the edge of a lake, with water flowing through it.

== History ==
Early grottos were mainly of the shell grotto type, mimicking a sea-cave, or in the form of a nymphaeum. The shells were often laid out in strict patterns in contemporary decorative styles used for plasterwork and the like. Later there was a move towards more naturalistic cave-like grottoes, sometimes showing the early influence of the Romantic movement.

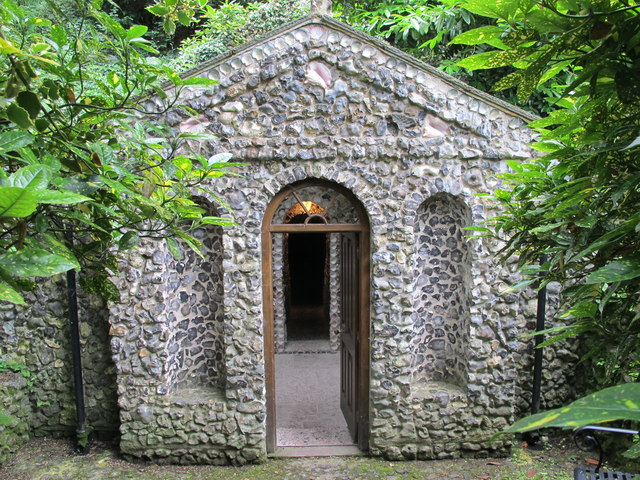
The porch of Scott's Grotto today

The first recorded shell grotto in England was at Whitehall Palace; James I had it built in the undercroft of the Banqueting House in 1624, but it has not survived. Two years later the Duke of Bedford had a shell room built at Woburn Abbey, featuring shell mosaics and carved stone. This, and another at Skipton Castle, built in 1627, are the only surviving examples from the 17th century.

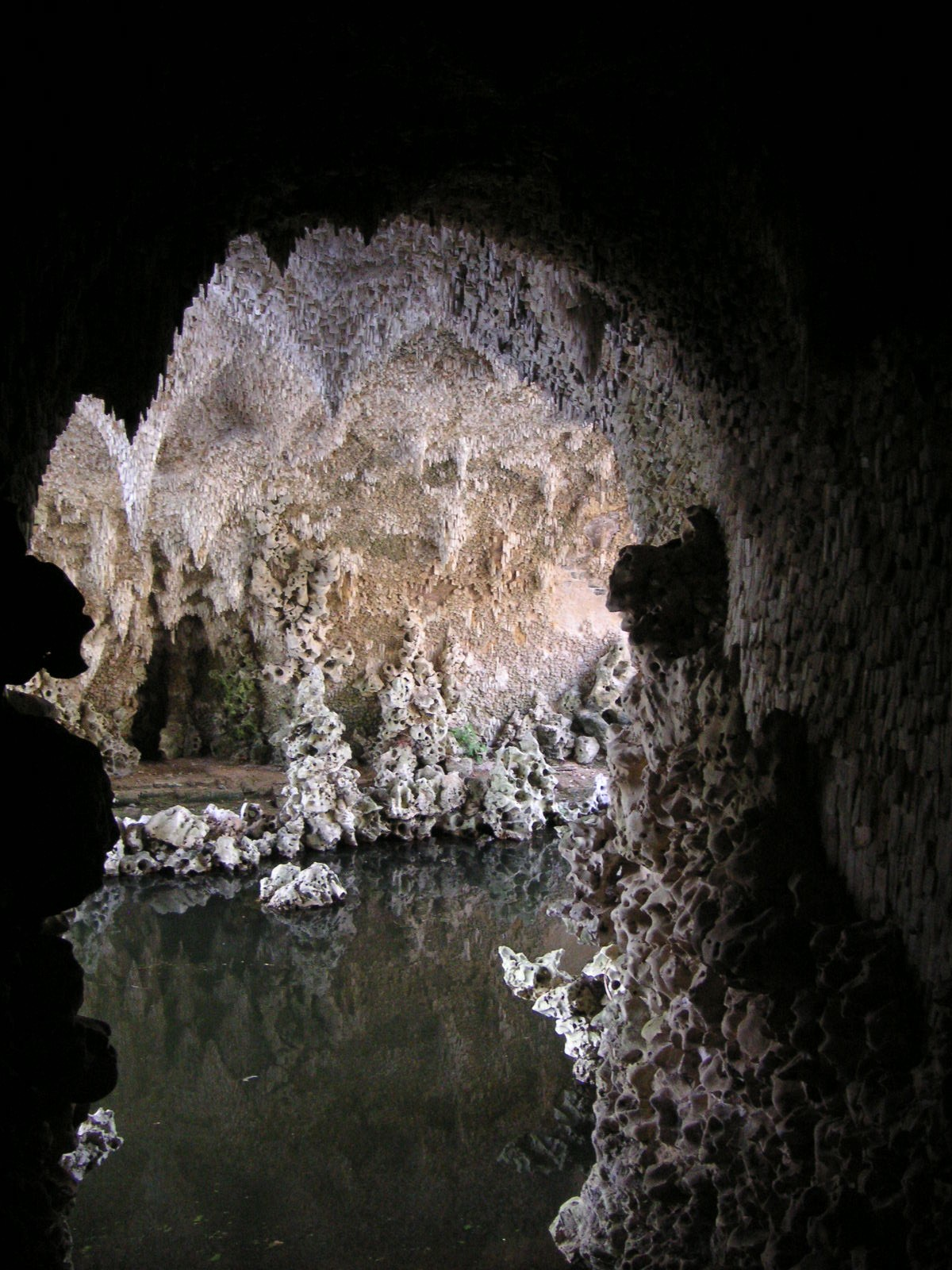
The shell-free Crystal Grotto at Painshill

Shell grottoes were an expensive luxury: the grotto at Oatlands Park cost £25,000 in 1781 and took 11 years to build; and at Fisherwick Park the Marquess of Donegall spent £10,000 on shells alone in 1789. The Grotto at Margate has 2,000 square feet or 190 square metres of mosaic, using some 4.6 million shells.

By the end of the 18th century, fashion had moved on to more naturalistic cave-like structures, like the weathered rock and crystal "Crystal Grotto" at Painshill in Surrey, before falling out of favour altogether. These were mostly outside, in garden pavilions, or built as caves beside water features. Many were demolished or have fallen into disrepair, but some 200 grottos of all types are known to have survived in some form in the UK.

== Examples ==
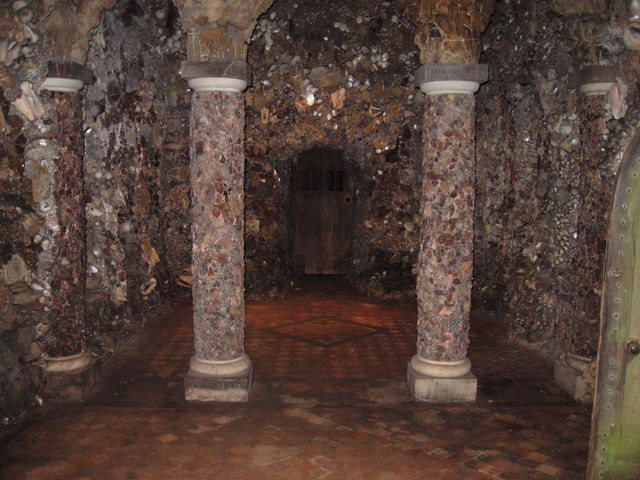
Goldney Hall, Bristol, England, begun 1737

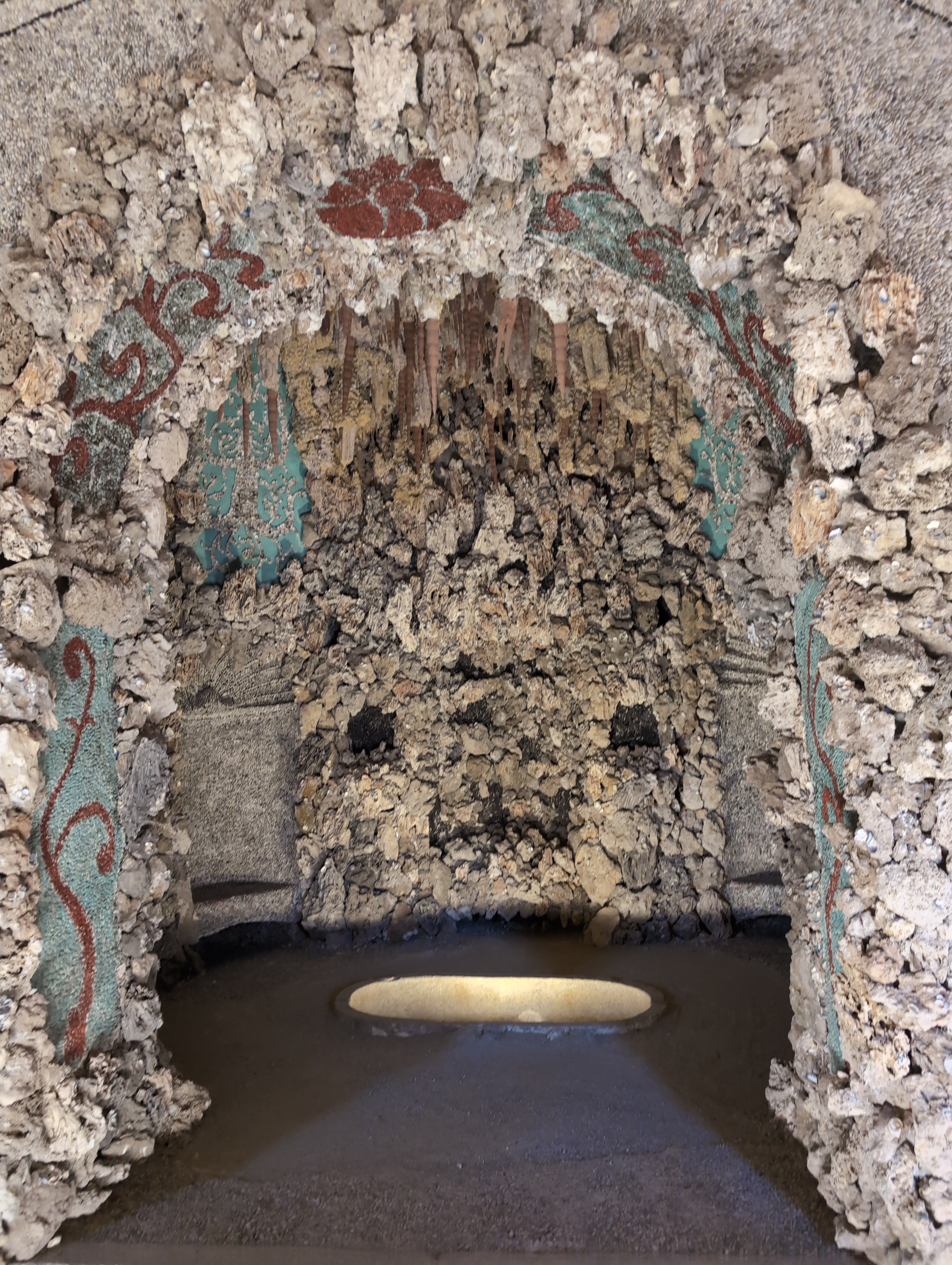
View inside the Sala Terrena in Schloss Greinburg

- The Grotto at Wanstead Park in Wanstead, Greater London; built about 1762 and now a ruin.
- Headley-Whitney Museum, in Lexington, Kentucky, US where a former three car garage was transformed into a shell grotto
- Paua House in Bluff, New Zealand, now partly re-created at Canterbury Museum, Christchurch
- Sala Terrena, Greinburg Castle, Grein, Austria, a grotto decorated with Danube pebbles in marine motifs, built 1625
- Scott's Grotto, in Ware, Hertfordshire, England
- Shell Grotto, Margate, Kent, England
- Shell Grotto, Pontypool, Wales
- The Shell Room at Woburn Abbey, the earliest surviving 17th-century shell grotto
- The east tower of Skipton Castle's gatehouse contains a 17th-century shell grotto
- Shell Grotto, Nienoord, a "treasury" at the Nienoord estate in Leek, Netherlands, c. 1700
- The Shell Grotto at Château de Vendeuvre
- The Shell Grotto at Endsleigh Cottage, England
- The Shell House in Terrington, N Yorkshire, UK
- Shell-covered gardening sheds in Grosvenor Gardens, London
- Shell-lined grotto at Goldney Hall, Bristol, England, begun 1737

== See also ==
- Shellcraft
