= Scott's Grotto =

Grade I listed building in Ware, Hertfordshire, England

Coordinates: 51°48′24″N 0°02′00″W

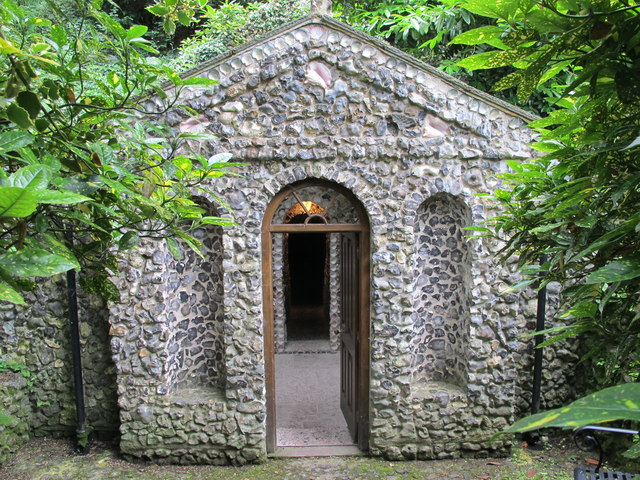
The porch of Scott's Grotto today.

Scott's Grotto in Ware, Hertfordshire, is a Grade I listed building and with six chambers the most extensive shell grotto in the United Kingdom. "It is, although on a small scale, far more complex than Alexander Pope's at Twickenham. Compared with the grotto at Stourhead, on the other hand, it is minute, but that only enhances the enchantment." The surrounding gardens and structures are Grade II* listed.

The grotto is set into the northeast face of a hill, and comprises an entrance hall and a series of six chambers extending over 65 feet (20 m) into and 30 feet (9.1 m) below the chalk hillside, together with air shafts, light wells and connecting passages. The chambers are decorated with shells, stones such as flint and fossils, and coloured glass. A plan drawn in 1900 calls the six chambers the "Council Chamber" (a circular chamber 12 feet (3.7 m) in diameter to the right of the entrance, with a domed roof light), and smaller chambers to the left of the entrance are named the "Committee Room No 2" (a square chamber with niches) and the "Refreshments Room"; on the centreline, connected by an air shaft, are the "Consulting Room", the "Committee Room", and the "Robing Room".

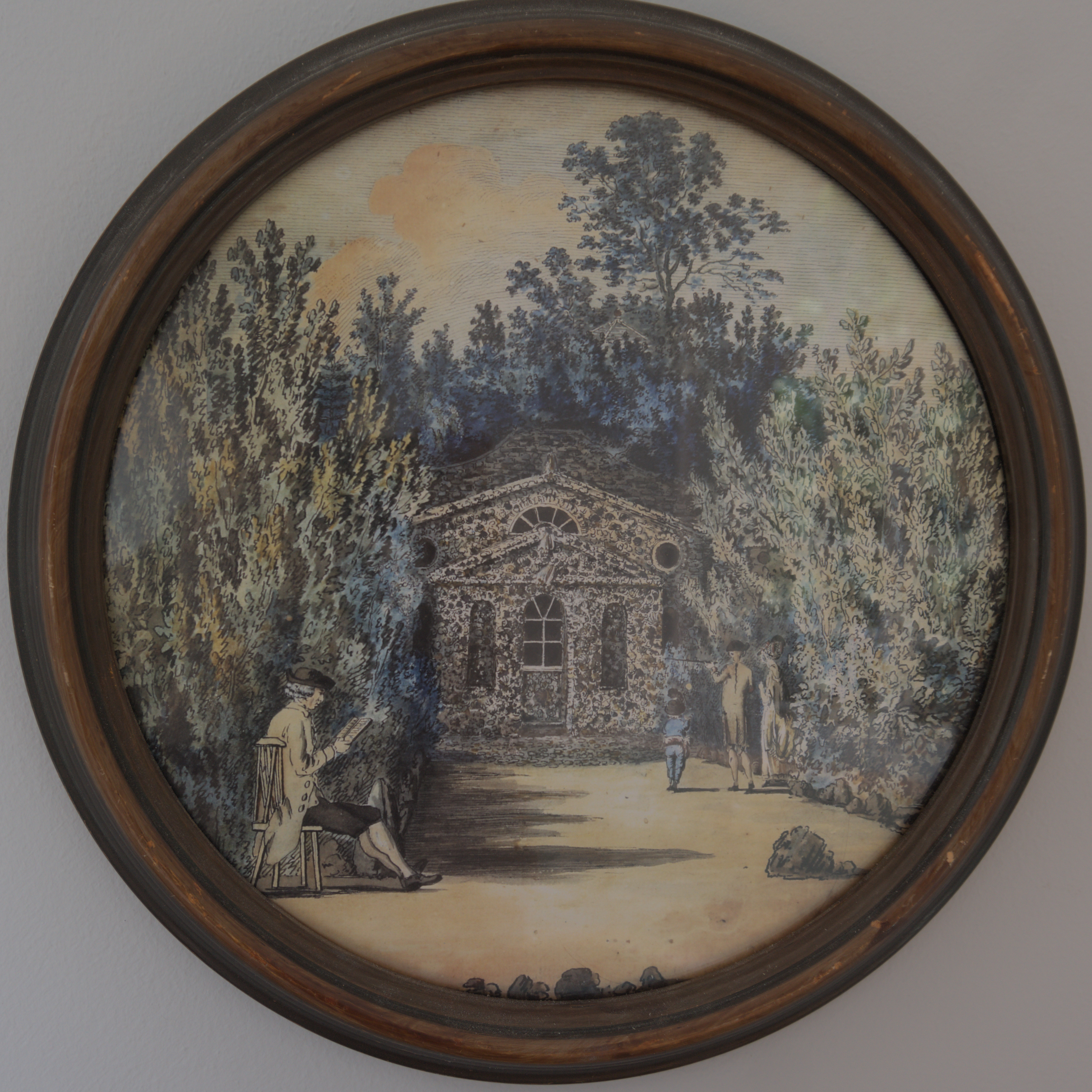
An 18th century contemporary engraving of Scott's Grotto at Amwell.

The grotto was formerly in the garden of Amwell House. Its construction may have taken several years and was completed by John Scott, an 18th-century Quaker poet who inherited Amwell House from his father in 1768. Scott also had other romantic features built in his garden, including an octagonal gazebo on the hillside above. Scott kept a book which lists 3,000 visitors from 1779 to 1787. Samuel Johnson visited in 1773, describing it as a "fairy hall".

The house and garden were inherited by Scott's daughter Marie. The nearby Scotts Road was built after she died in 1863 and the land was acquired by British Land for development. The grotto was opened to visiting tourists in the 19th century, and become a listed building in 1950. Modern houses were built on Scotts Road in the 1960s and 1970s; originally the builders intended to demolish the grotto to build houses, but the local council intervened and the grotto was left in a patch of open ground.

The grotto was acquired by East Hertfordshire District Council in 1974, and was restored in 1990–91 by the Ware Society. The works included a reconstruction of the entrance hall that had been demolished in 1960: a small fragment of the demolished Berlin Wall was inserted in the entrance hall as a time marker. The architect for the restoration was James Howley and the project manager David Perman, Hon. Secretary of the Ware Society.

The grotto and gardens are now owned and managed by the Scott's Grotto Trust, Charity Number 1180709.

== See also ==
- Shell grotto
