= Storm tides of the North Sea =

Storm tides in the North Sea are coastal floods caused by storms

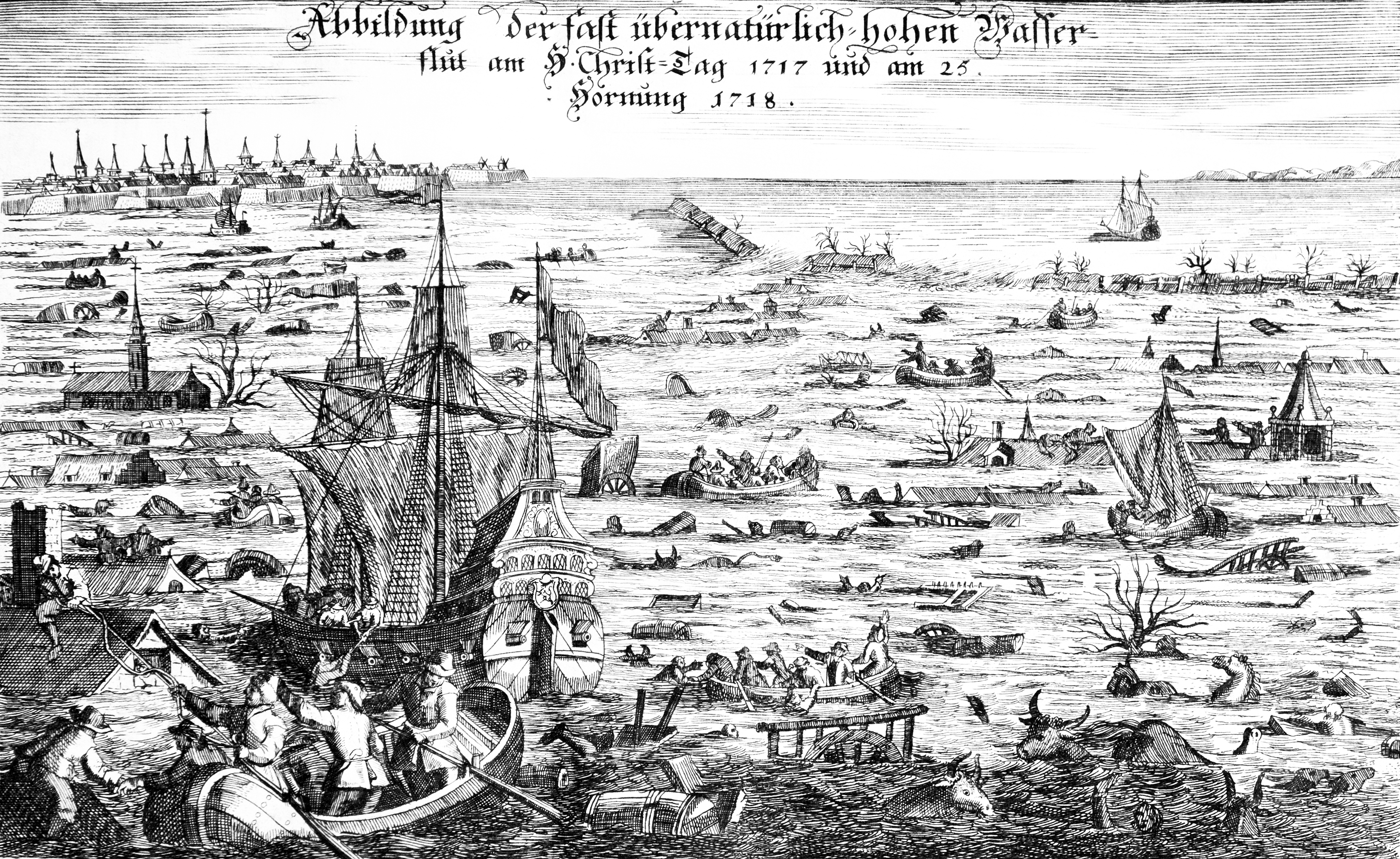
The Christmas Flood of 1717

Storm tides of the North Sea are coastal floods associated with extratropical cyclones crossing over the North Sea, the severity of which is affected by the shallowness of the sea and the orientation of the shoreline relative to the storm's path, as well as the timing of tides. The water level can rise to more than 5 metres (17 ft) above the normal tide as a result of storm tides.

Northern Germany and Denmark are particularly susceptible to storm tides. The coastline of the German Bight forms an L-shape facing northwest. Also vulnerable are the United Kingdom and the Netherlands, where the sea shallows and is funnelled toward the English Channel.

Storm tides are a regular occurrence in the North Sea basin; several form each year. Although most do not cause significant damage, the impact of some has been devastating. During one, the February flood of 1825, the Danish coastline changed, as the North Jutlandic Island became separated from the Jutland Peninsula.

== Major storm tides ==
- 838, December 26, Netherlands, more than 2,400 deaths
- 1014, September 28, Netherlands, several thousands of deaths
- 1099, November 11, The Anglo-Saxon Chronicle states, that in London "On the festival of St Martin, the sea flood sprung up to such a height and did so much harm as no man remembered that it ever did before".
- 1164, February 16, Saint Juliana flood, Netherlands and Germany, several thousands of deaths
- 1170, November 1, All Saints' Flood, Netherlands, marks beginning of creation of Zuiderzee
- 1212, Netherlands, possible 36,000 or 60,000 deaths, but doubt whether it happened at all.
- 1219, January 16, Saint Marcellus flood, Netherlands and Germany, 36,000 deaths struck West Friesland
- 1248, a year with three storm tides in The Netherlands with major inundations
- 1277, Netherlands and Germany, formation of Dollart
- 1277, Netherlands and Germany, formation of Lauwerszee
- 1282, Netherlands, separates island of Texel from mainland
- 1287, December 13, Saint Lucia flood, Netherlands, formation of Waddenzee and Zuiderzee, 50,000–80,000 deaths. Major impact on Cinque Ports in England.
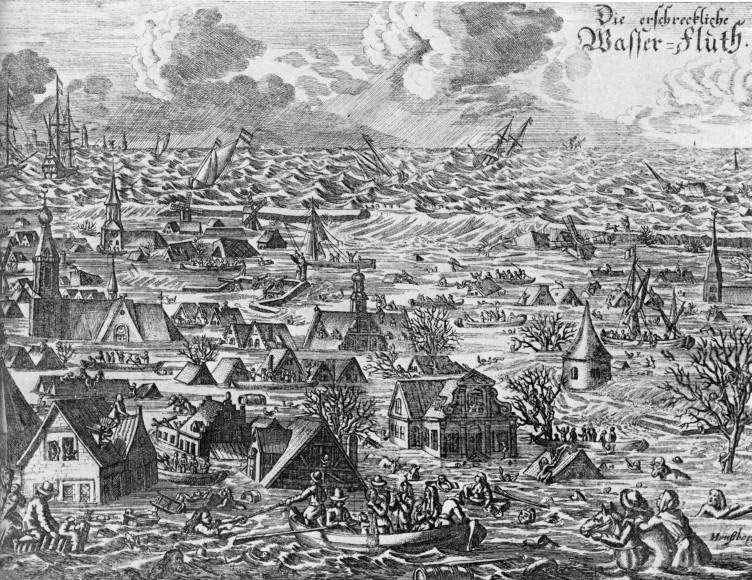
  The Burchardi flood in October 1634
- 1288, February 5, Saint Agathaflood, Netherlands, several thousands of deaths
- 1322, Netherlands and Belgium, Flanders loses all coastal islands, many deaths especially in Holland, Zeeland and Flanders
- 1334, November 23, Netherlands, several thousands of deaths
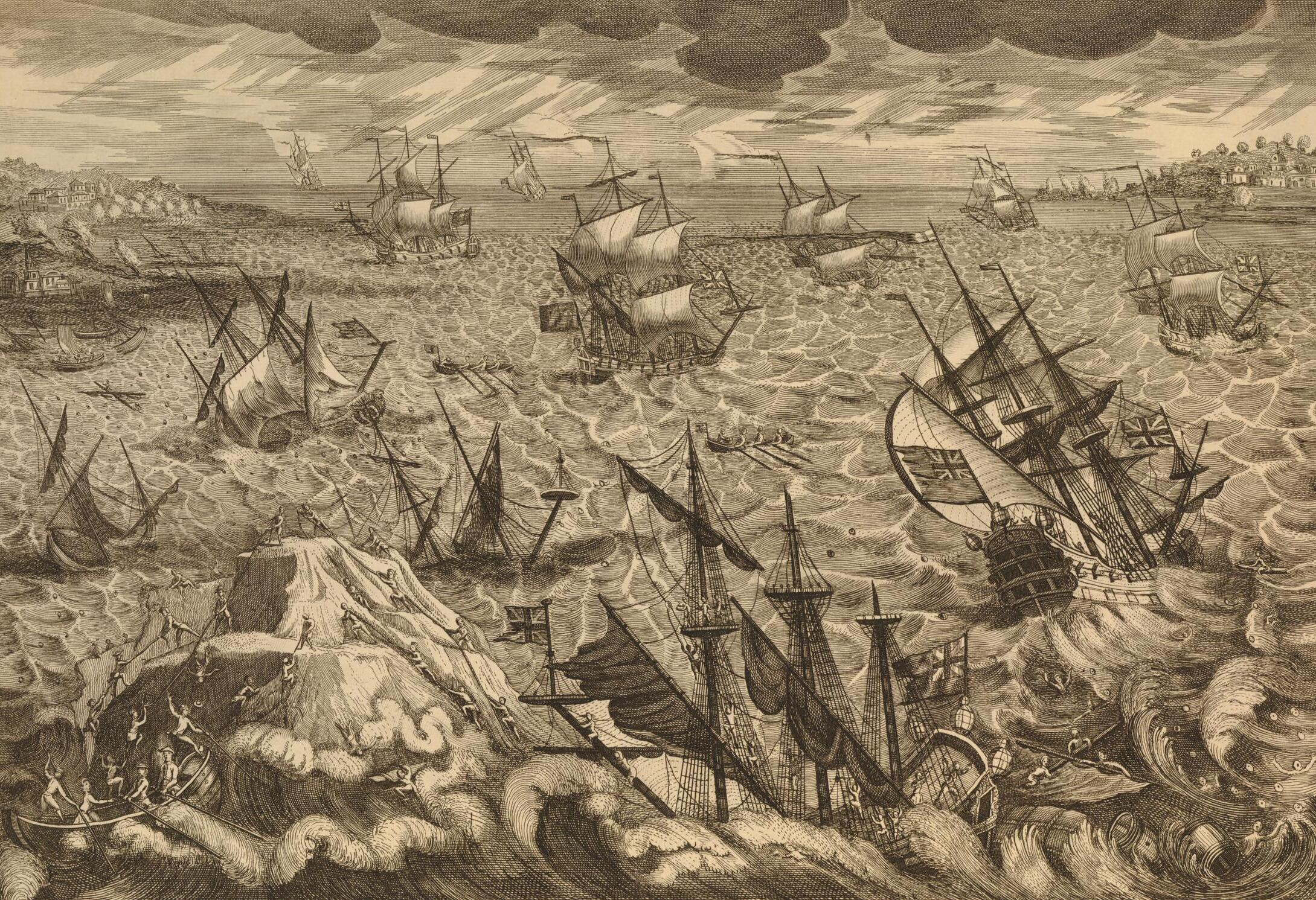
  The Great Storm of 1703
- 1362, January 16, Grote Mandrenke (big drowner of men) or Saint Marcellus flood, Belgium, Netherlands, Germany and Denmark, created a great part of the Wadden Sea and caused the end of the city of Rungholt; 25,000 to 40,000 deaths, according to some sources 100,000 deaths
- 1404, November 19, first Saint Elisabeth flood, Belgium and Netherlands, major loss of land
- 1421, November 19, second Saint Elisabeth flood, Netherlands, storm tide in combination with extreme high water in rivers due to heavy rains, 10,000 to 100,000 deaths
- 1424, November 18, third Saint Elisabeth flood, Netherlands
- 1468, Ursula flood, should have been more forceful than second Saint Elisabeth flood
- 1477, first Cosmas- and Damianus flood, Netherlands and Germany, many thousands of deaths
- 1530, November 5, St. Felix's Flood, Belgium and Netherlands, many towns disappear, more than 100,000 deaths
- 1532, November 1, All Saints flood, Belgium, Netherlands and Germany, several towns disappear, many thousands of deaths
- 1570, November 1, All Saints flood, Belgium and Netherlands, several towns disappear, more than 20,000 deaths
- 1571–72, unknown date, marine flooding on the Lincolnshire coast between Boston and Grimsby resulted in the loss of "all the saltcotes where the best salt was made".
- 1634, October 11–12, Burchardi flood, Germany and Denmark, broke the Island of Strand into parts (Nordstrand and Pellworm) in Nordfriesland, and also resulted in the highest recorded floods in southwestern Jutland
- 1651, February 22 in Germany, March 4–5 Netherlands, St. Peter's Flood
- 1663, December 7, The diarist Samuel Pepys noted "the greatest tide that ever was remembered in England to have been in this river, all Whitehall having been drowned."
- 1686, November 12, Saint Martin flood, Netherlands, 1586 deaths
- 1703, December 7, Great Storm of 1703, England, Belgium, Netherlands and Germany, many thousands of deaths
- 1717, December 24, Christmas Flood of 1717, Netherlands, Germany and Scandinavia, more than 14,000 deaths
- 1810, November 10, In Boston, Lincolnshire up to 10 deaths are thought to have occurred in the town due to a storm surge.
- 1825, February 3–5, February flood of 1825, Germany and Netherlands, 800 deaths
- 1916, January 13–14, Zuiderland flood Netherlands, 16 casualties and ~300 km2 flooded around the Zuiderzee this flood led to the construction of the Afsluitdijk, creating the IJsselmeer.
- 1949, January 8, Storm disturbance in the North Sea.
- 1953, January 31 – February 1, North Sea flood of 1953, most severe in the Netherlands, leading to the Delta Works, 2533 deaths
- 1962, February 16–17, North Sea flood of 1962, flooded one fifth of Hamburg and claimed 315 lives
- 1976, January 3–4, Gale of January 1976
- 1978, January 11–12, 1978 North Sea storm surge, East coast of England.
- 1981, November 24–25, North Frisian Flood, severe surge with dike breaches in Denmark.
- 1982, December 19, the largest negative surge recorded in the North Sea coincided with a high tide, water levels dropped rapidly posing a navigational hazard.
- 1993, February 21, an internal surge in the North Sea and high waves brought flooding to the Norfolk Broads.
- 1999, December 3, Cyclone Anatol
- 2007, November 8–9, North Sea flood of 2007 (Tilo)
- 2011, November 24–27, Cyclone Berit (Xaver) and "Lille Berit" (Yoda).
- 2013, October 10, east coast of England surge (Xenon), Environment Agency warning of minor flooding and disruption, tide passed without major flooding.
- 2013, December 5–7, On 4 December the Environment Agency released a warning to communities along the East Coast of England to prepare for the most serious tidal surge in 30 years, with a significant threat of coastal flooding, associated with Cyclone Xaver.
- 2017, January 4–5, storm Axel.
- 2017, January 12–13, (incl. Vidar NO).

== Recent storm tides ==
The flood of 1976 and the "North Frisian Flood" of 1981 brought the highest water levels measured to date on the North Sea coast, but because of sea defences such as improved warning systems and dikes built and modified after the flood of 1962, these led only to property damage.

=== Comparative table of surge heights along the east coast of Britain ===
Water levels during the storm surges of 1953, 1976, 1978, 1983, 1993, 2006 and 2013 (metres O.D.)
Location	1953 evening tide	1976 evening tide	1978 observed evening tide	1983 February	1993 January/February 1993	2006 November 1	2013 December 5
Wick	–	–	3.92	–	–	–	2.07
North Shields	3.32	3.43	3.52	–	–	–	3.58
Barton on Humber	–	–	5.15	–	–	–	–
South Ferriby	4.79	5.30	5.30	–	–	–	–
Immingham	4.50	4.50	4.67	–	–	–	5.80
Grimsby	–	4.35	4.50	–	–	–	–
Boygrift	–	4.30	4.50	–	–	–	–
Boston Dock	5.25	5.24	5.50	–	–	–	–
Boston Grand Sluice	5.40	5.22	5.63	–	–	–	–
Boston	–	–	–	–	–	–	6.10
Fosdyke	ca. 5.40	5.18	5.90	–	–	–	–
Wisbech	ca. 5.10	4.99	5.60	–	–	–	–
King's Lynn	5.65	4.99	5.92	–	–	–	–
Wells	5.13	4.46	4.91	–	–	–	5.31
Great Yarmouth	3.28	2.69	2.19	2.59	-	2.52	-
Haddiscoe	-	-	1.76	1.70	1.58	1.74	-
Lowestoft	-	-	-	-	-	-	2.97
Southwold	3.50	2.50	2.00	–	–	–	–
Aldeburgh	3.78	2.83	2.45	–	–	–	–
Sheerness	–	-	–	–	-	–	3.00

== See also ==
- Floods in the Netherlands
- Geography of Germany
- List of settlements lost to floods in the Netherlands
- Storm surge
