= The Sinbadventurers =

2015 opera by Benjamin Gordon

- Opera by Benjamin Gordon
- Native title: Die Hamburger Sindbadauken
- Librettist: Francis Hüsers
- Language: German
- Premiere: 8 February 2015; Hamburg State Opera

The Sinbadventurers (German: Die Hamburger Sindbadauken) is an opera for children composed by Benjamin Gordon with a libretto by Francis Hüsers. The subtitle is Ein Kinderoperabenteuerspaß (English: An Operadventuretainment for Children). The German title refers to the name the three child protagonists give themselves, a combination of "Sindbad" and "Rabauken" (ruffian) which is used either to refer to rude adults or jokingly, for ill-behaved children. It was commissioned by the Hamburg State Opera and was first performed on February 8, 2015, with the composer conducting.

== Roles ==
(all roles sung by children unless otherwise noted)

- Lotte (13 years old)
- Kalle (11 years old)
- Lily (9 years old)
- Igor Oberechoist, (extremely fat) captain of the Echoist Pirates (baritone)
- The Echoist Helmsman
- The Echoist Treasurer
- The Littlest Echoist, Cindy Magnificent
- The Echoist Pirates (chorus)
- Caesar Knochenschmalz, people eater (bass)
- Cindy Magnifiscent, beautiful sorceress (soprano)
- Emperor Willy the Second
- Otto von Bismarck (played by Caesar Knochenschmalz)
- 3 Hottentotten
- 3 Helgoland Seagulls
- Women from Rungholt (Chorus)
- Men from Rungholt (Chorus)
- The Mayor of Rungholt (played by Willy the Second)

== Synopsis ==
Adventure beckons Lotte, Kalle and Lilli, who set their raft on the Elbe towards the open sea. Before their plans of discovering sunken treasure are realized, a storm destroys the raft. Pirates rescue them and subsequently demand remuneration. Since the three Sinbadventurers can offer nothing in return, the pirates prepare to throw them back into the sea, but cooler heads prevail: the three children might be helpful in rescuing the pirates' captain, who is being held captive by the man-eater Caesar Knochenschmalz.

Caesar Knochenschmalz is not the least bit interested in any deal involving three skinny children, since he has gone to great lengths to fatten Captain Igor. Lotte persuades the man-eater to try some of the tofu which the pirates have on board. Caesar Knochenschmalz is not only enthralled with Lotte's barbecue tofu but also enamored of Lotte herself. He pronounces Lotte to be his bride, and gives Captain Igor back to the pirates. Lotte protests, but Kalle and Lilli convince her to go along with the engagement, as is the only way to save their skin until they can plot their escape.

On the way back to Hamburg, the ship runs aground on a seemingly deserted island. The nasty smell of sweaty feet permeates the otherwise enchanted island, whose sole inhabitant is the sorceress, Cindy Magnifiscent. Cindy proceeds to magically transform the uninvited visitors into cows, pigs, sheep and chickens, with the exception of Kalle, who persuades Cindy (holding his nose all the while) to let him wash her feet. Transfixed, she transforms all the animals back into people, saving Caesar Knochenschmalz for last, augmenting his retransformation with a special love-spell. No longer a cow, he falls instantly in love with Cindy and breaks off his engagement to Lotte. Lotte gives Cindy the recipe for barbecue tofu while Cindy and Caesar proclaim their love for one another. The others board the pirate ship and set sail for Hamburg.

In between the scenes are two interludes, one comic and one tragic. The first imagines an encounter between Kaiser Wilhelm II and Otto von Bismarck, who scheme to get Heligoland back from the British; the second recounts the catastrophic demise of the 14th century city Rungholt, explaining how gold might have found its way into the North Sea.

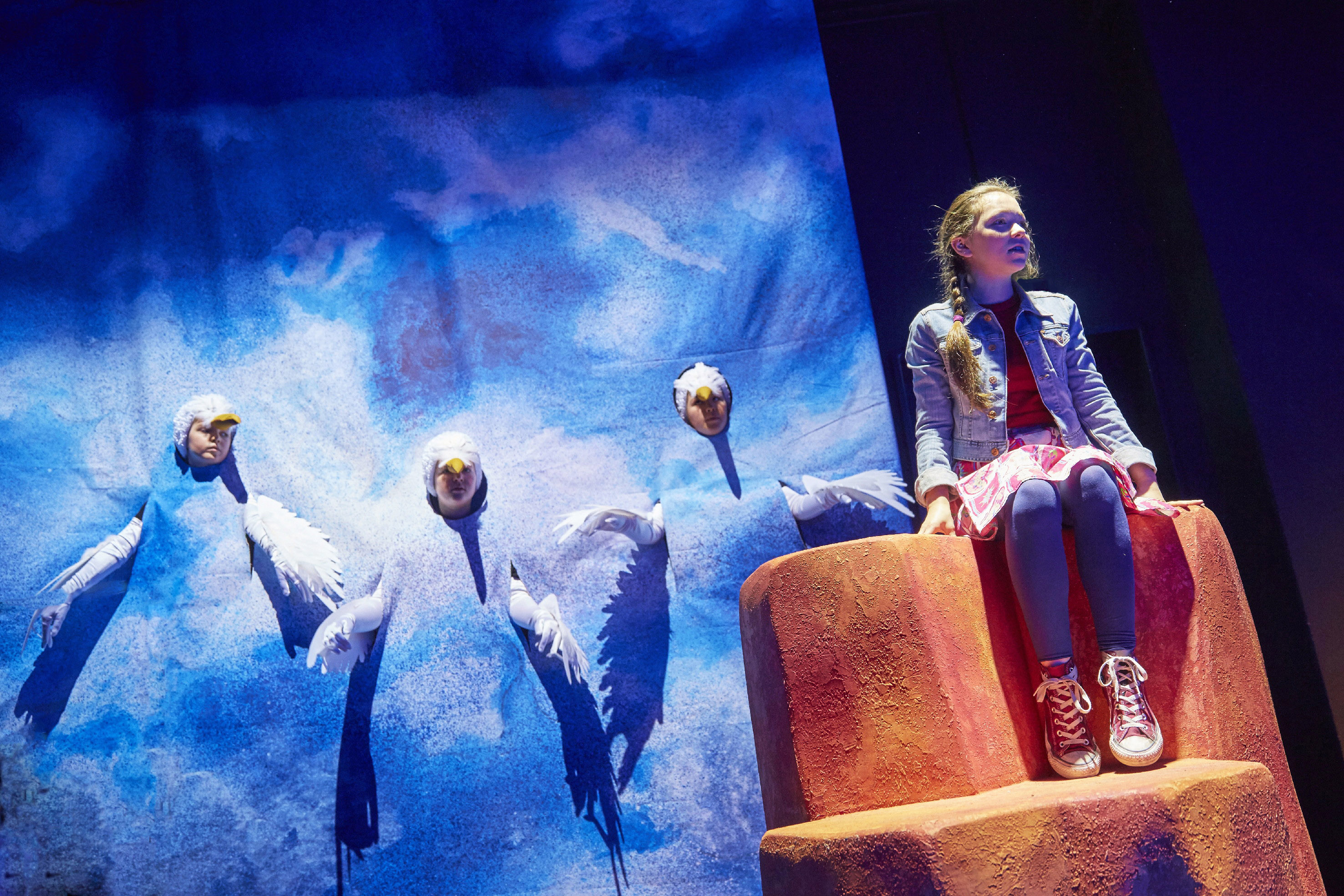
Three Heligoland Seagulls, Lotte perched on the red cliff

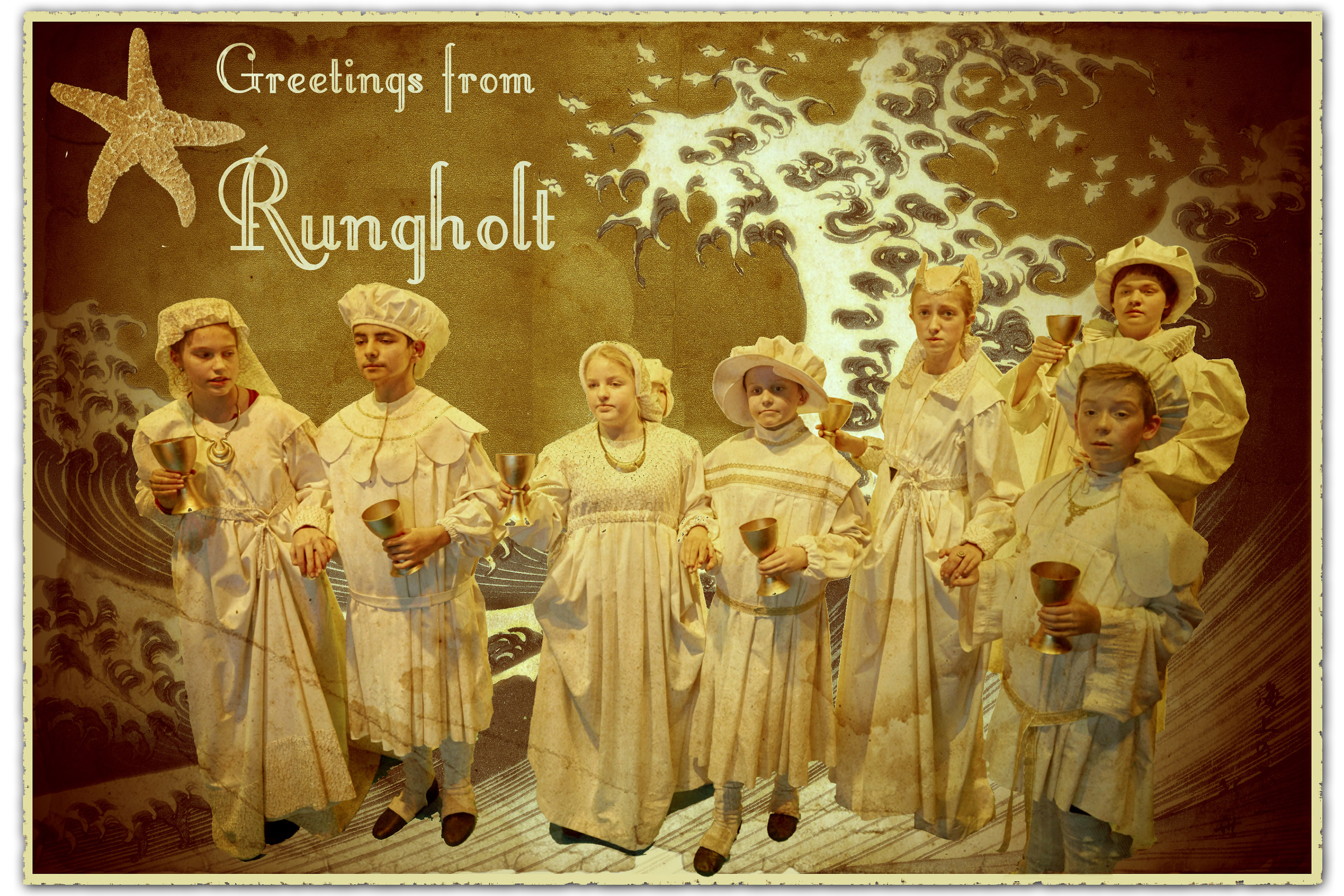
Men and Women of Rungholt

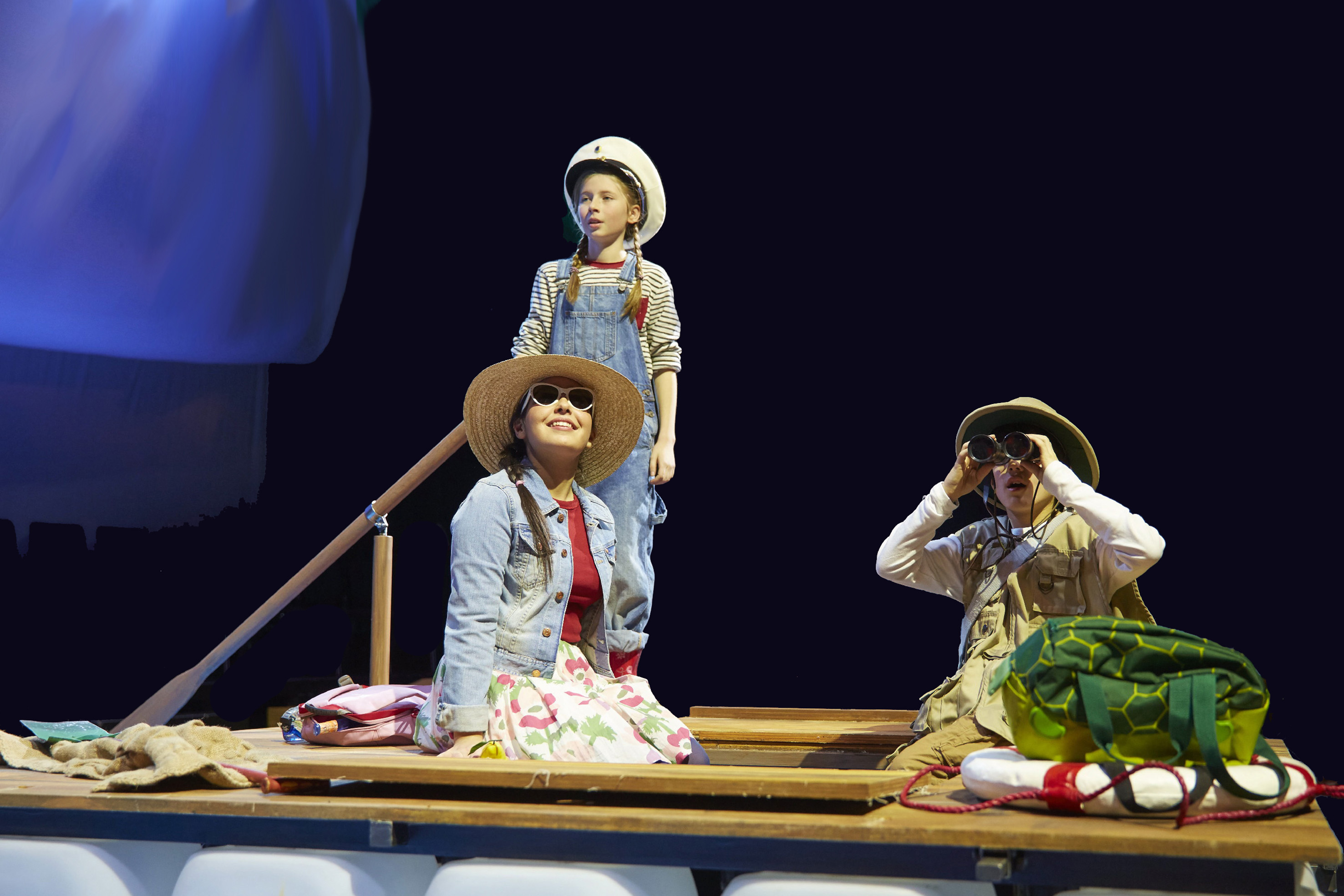
Lotte, Lily and Kalle on the raft

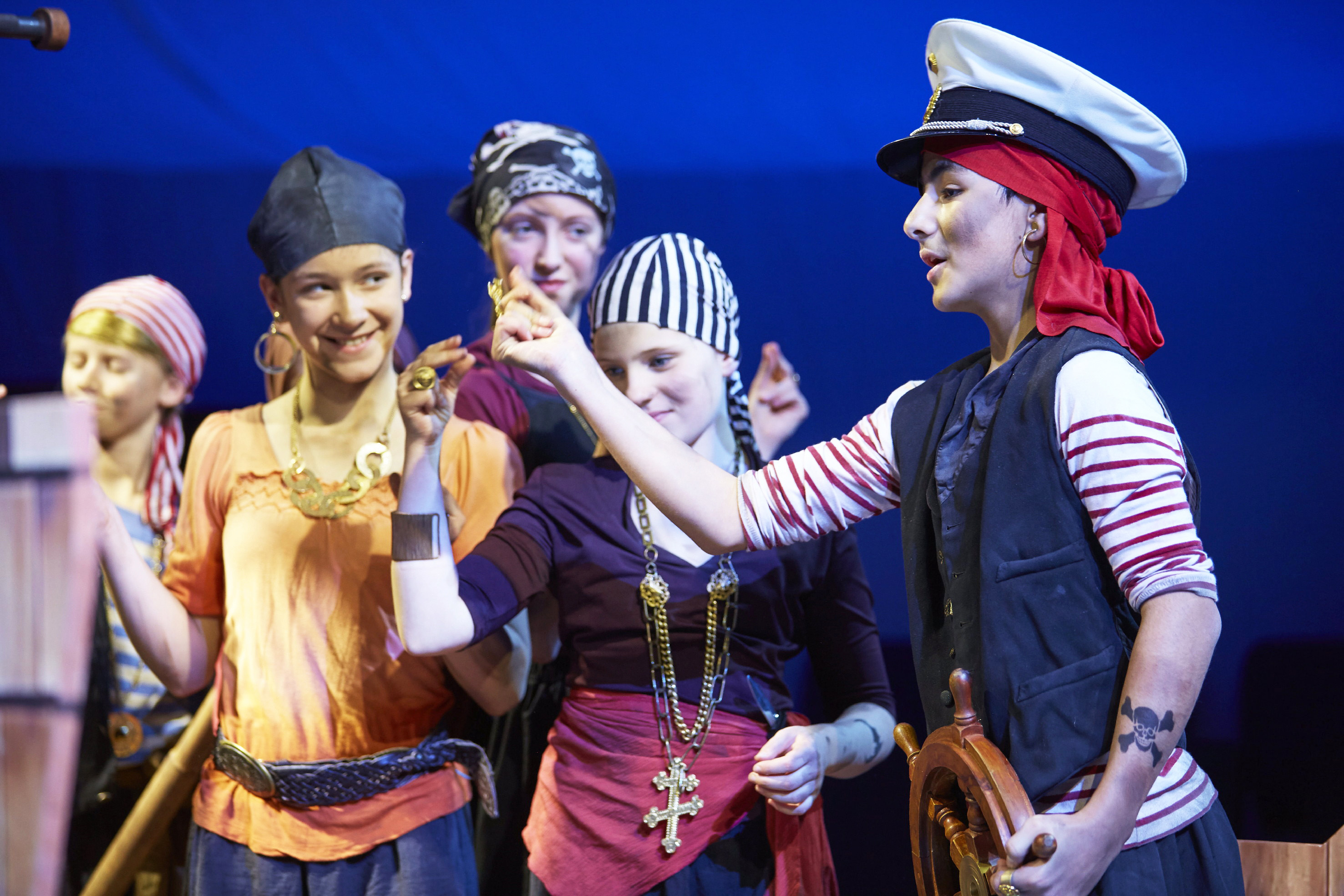
The Echoist Pirates, Helmsman

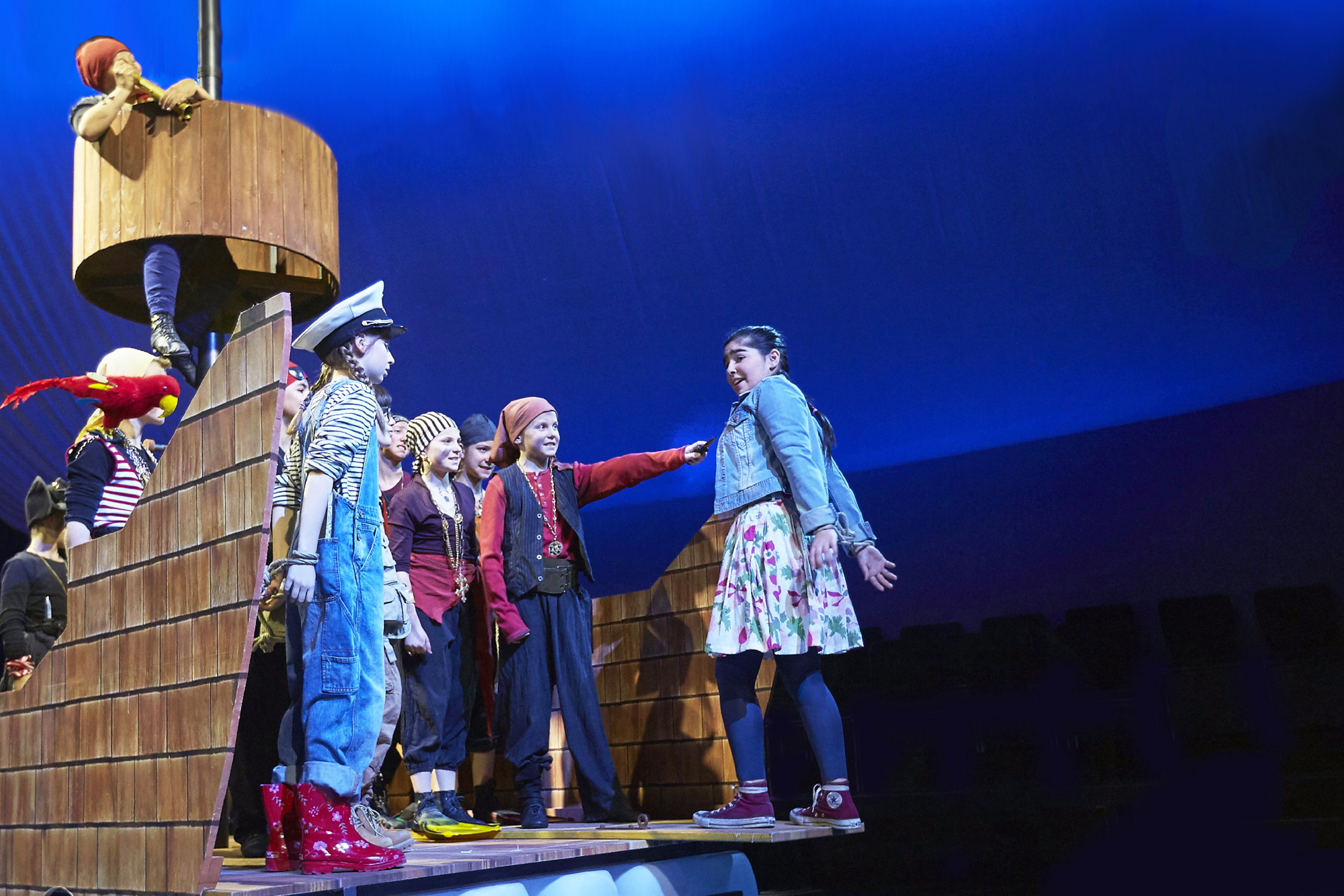
The Echoist Pirates make Lotte walk the plank

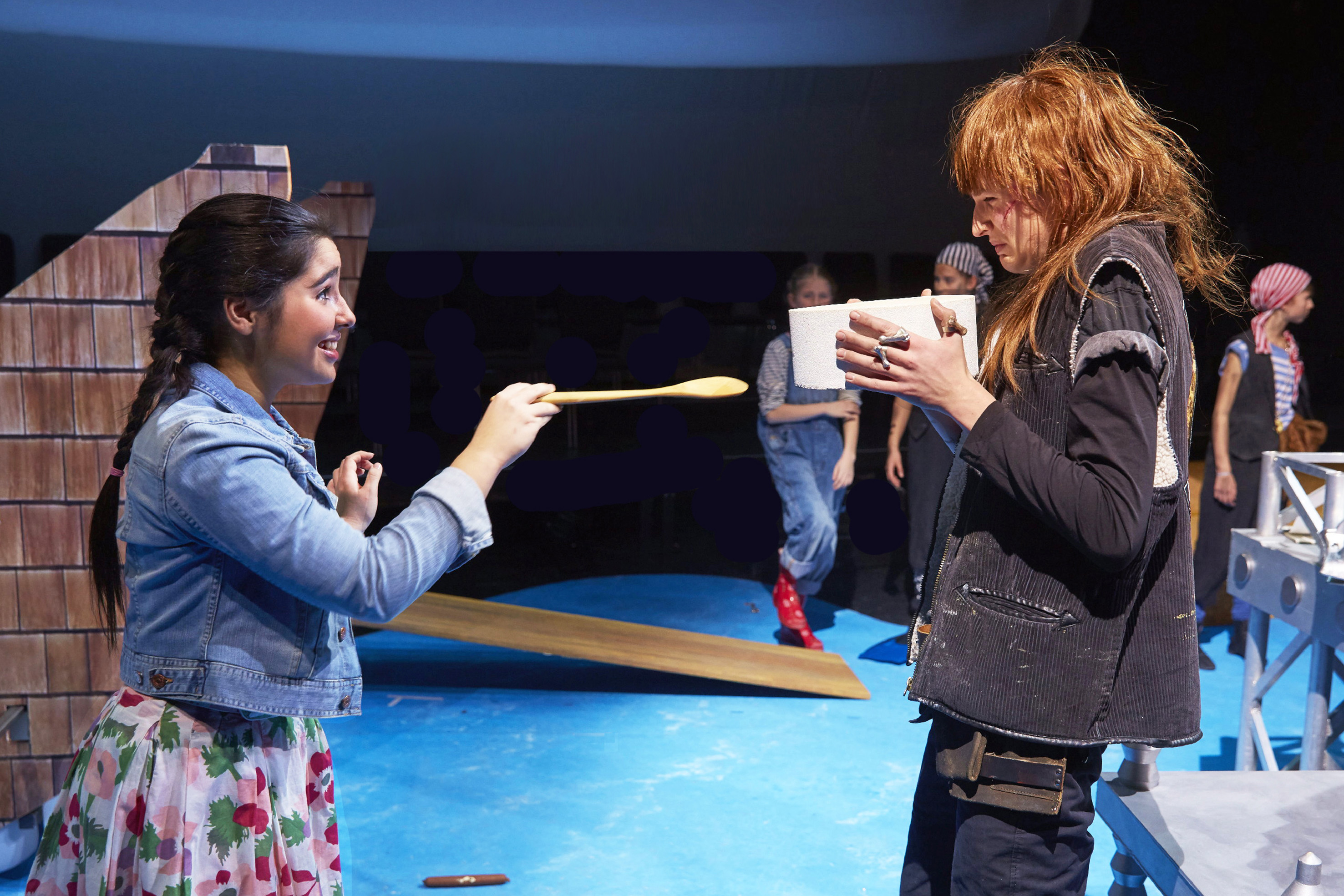
Lotte offers a taste of tofu to Caesar Knochenschmalz

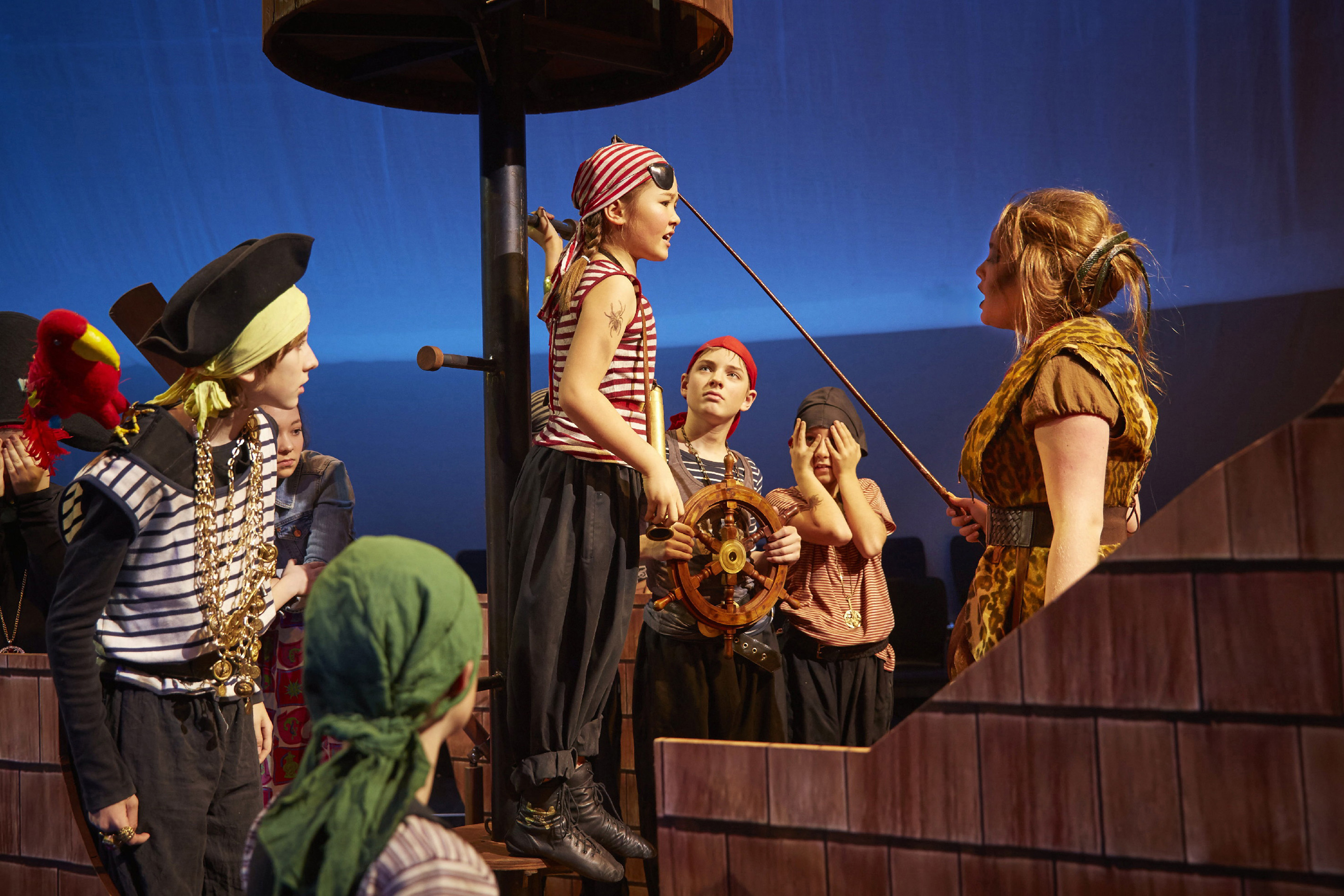
The Littlest Echoist stands up to Cindy Magnifiscent

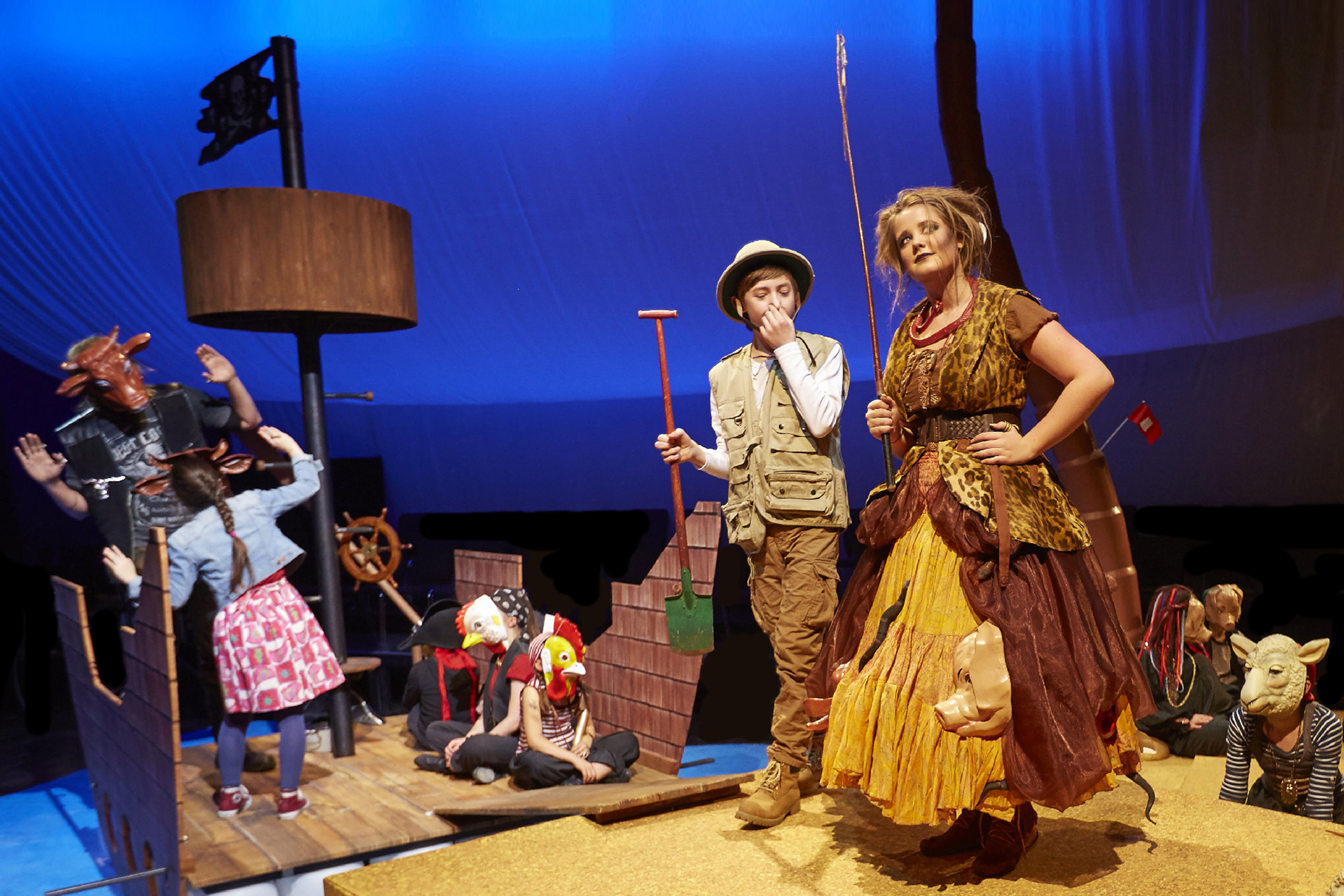
Kalle holds his nose because of Cindy Magnifiscent's feet

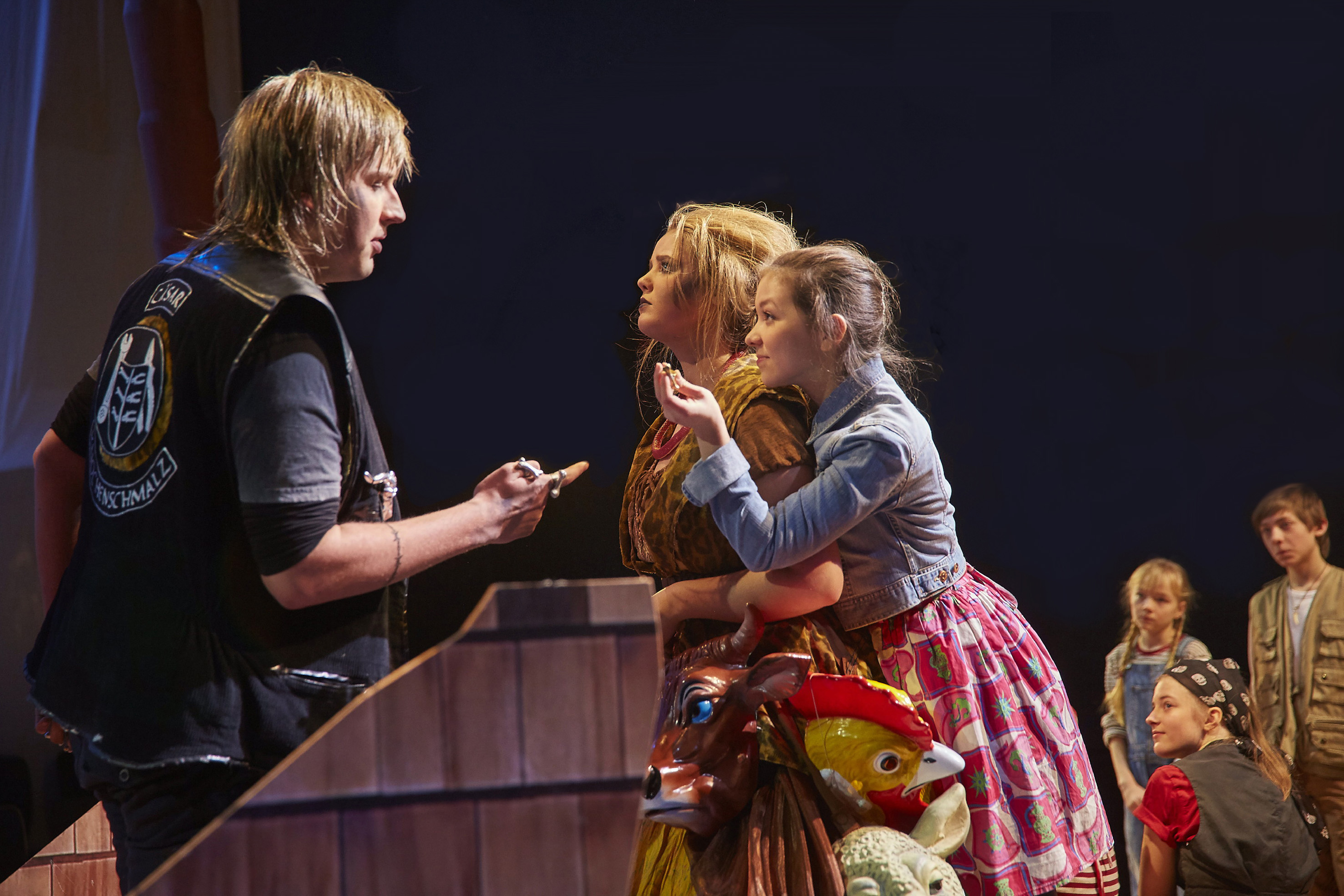
Caesar Knochenschmalz, Cindy Magnificent, Lotte

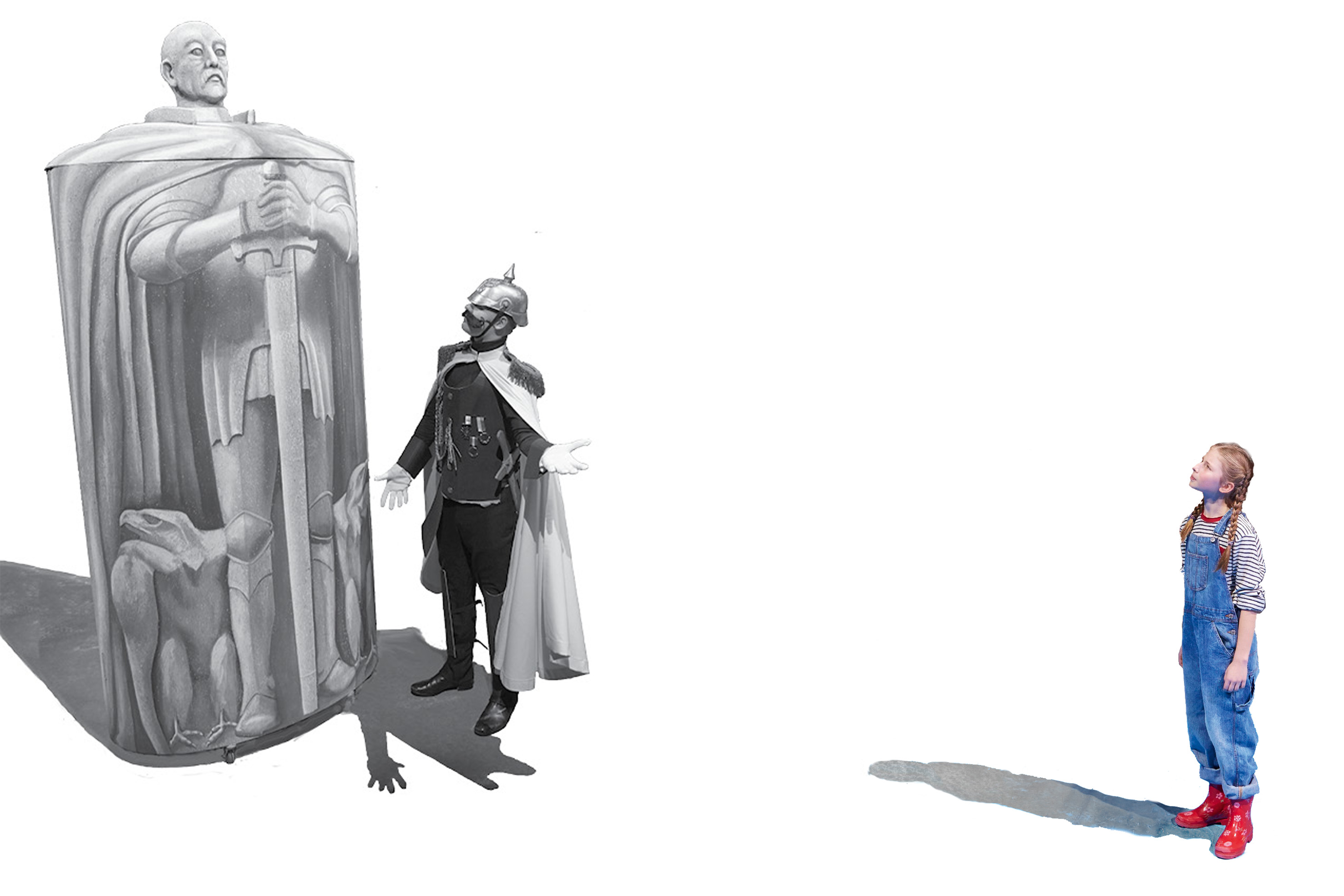
Emperor Willy the Second, Otto von Bismarck, Lily

== Orchestration ==
1 Flute doubling piccolo and soprano recorder
1 Soprano saxophone doubling soprano recorder
1 Alto saxophone doubling alto recorder
1 Tenor saxophone doubling tenor recorder
1 Baritone saxophone
1 B♭ Trumpet
2 Percussionists: 3 (or 4) cymbals (crash, splash and ride cymbal + sizzler chain, or fourth sizzler cymbal), snare drum, hi-hat and bass drum with pedal (also with mallet); finger cymbals, Chinese C♯ opera gong, wind chimes, LP one-handed triangle, triangle (hanging); samba whistles, cuica, lotus flute (slide whistle); afuche, claves, guiro, shakers, maracas, rainmaker; whip, ratchet, vibraslap, castanets, 4 temple blocks, 2 agogô, 2 cow bells; bongos, congas; old drum or frame drum, 2 ocean drums, tambourine; vibraphone (f-f3), xylophone (f1-c5)

Violin div. á 3 doubling mandolin
Cello div. á 3
Contrabass doubling kalimba (thumb piano) in Bb
Miscellanea: Musical spoons (played by Kalle onstage), 4 glass bottles (played with metal or plastic chopsticks, played by cellos I and II)

== Background ==
Benjamin Gordon trained as a cellist and conductor; however, he began composing while he was musical director of children's operas at the Staatsoper Hamburg. Under his guidance, from 2001 to 2015, the series opera piccola broke new ground by presenting operas to thousands of young people, performed by their peers under the motto "opera for children, opera by children". For 2015, the final year of her ten-year tenure as general music director, Simone Young approached Gordon and Hüsers to create a new opera that had a connection to the city of Hamburg.

Inspired by multiple legends (Homer's Odyssey, Sinbad the Sailor, Klaus Störtebeker), Hüsers wrote a story about three children who build their own raft and then fall into the hands of pirates, using his own experience of a raft-trip gone wrong as the starting point. He interweaves historical events (The Heligoland–Zanzibar Treaty of 1890) as well as the lost city of Rungholt, which was completely wiped out in the Saint Marcellus's flood in 1362, causing at least 25,000 deaths. About the opera, Hüsers wrote:

The moral that should be perceptible – despite all of the playfulness in the text – is that everyone – not matter how unfamiliar they might seem – is deserving of our compassion, and secondly, having courage not to shy away from them but to interact with them will always pay off.

== Reception ==
Musicals are yesterday's news: the music in The Sinbadventurers is for connoisseurs – sophisticated yet colorful, with flashes of pop and jazz. Benjamin Gordon simultaneously mixes genres, delivering a work filled with catchy tunes that you can't get out of your head. It also proves that children are more receptive and unbiased when it comes to contemporary music.

— Daniel Kaiser, NDR
