= Rungholt =

Historical settlement in Schleswig

Location of Rungholt in present Schleswig-Holstein

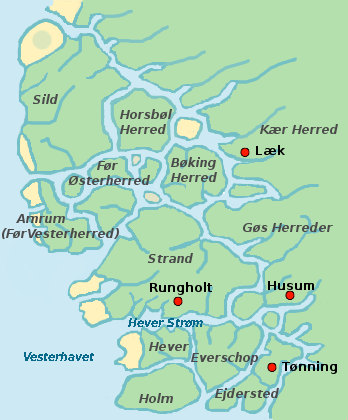
North Frisian coastline before 1362

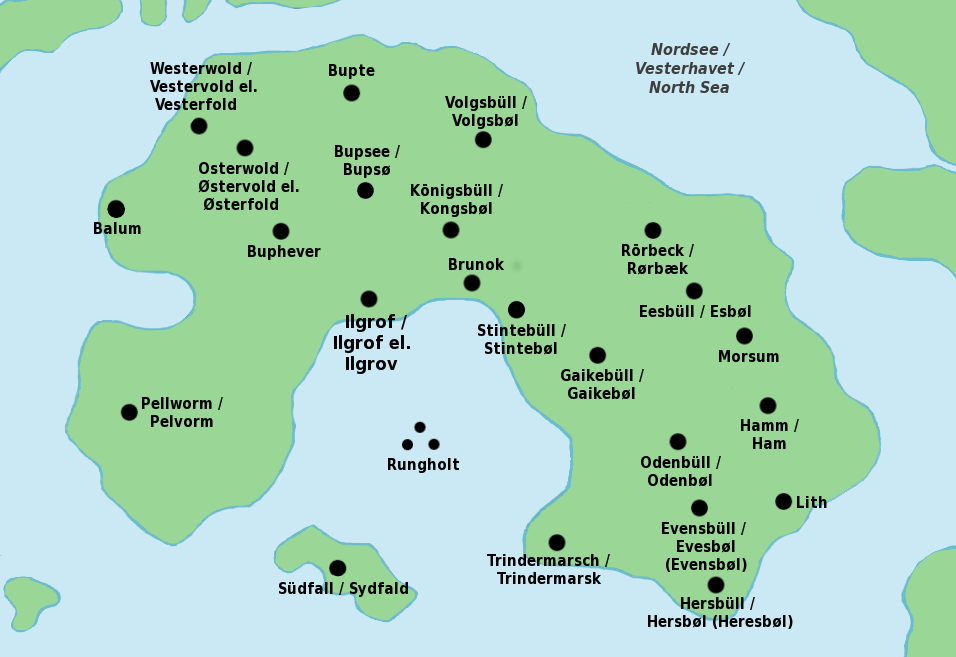
The island of Strand after the Grote Mandrenke (Danish: Den Store Manddrukning) with German and Danish place names

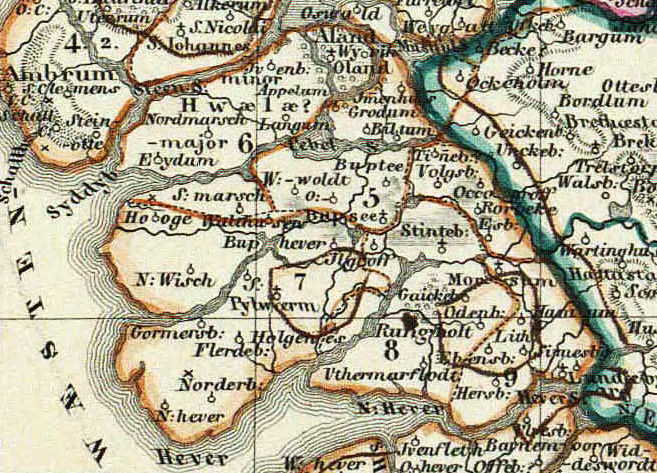
Rungholt and Strand in the Middle Ages, on a map from 1850

Rungholt was a low-lying settlement in North Frisia, in what was then the Danish Duchy of Schleswig. The area today lies in Germany. Rungholt was flooded, with massive erosion, when a storm tide (known as Grote Mandrenke or Den Store Manddrukning) hit the coast on 15 or 16 January 1362.

== Location ==
Rungholt was situated on the island of Strand, which was largely destroyed by the Burchardi Flood of 1634; remaining fragments include the Nordstrand peninsula and the islets of Hallig Südfall, Pellworm and Nordstrandischmoor, while the rest now forms tidal flats in the surrounding Wadden Sea.

In 1921, ruins believed to represent Rungholt were discovered around Hallig Südfall: wells, trenches and part of a tidal lock. In June 2023, the German Research Foundation announced that researchers had confirmed this identification, and had already mapped 10 square kilometers of the area including key features such as a church. Detailed archeological investigations of the remains of buildings, dykes and a harbour have been published.

== History ==
Documents about Rungholt mostly date from much later times (16th century). Archaeologists think Rungholt was an important town and port. It might have contained up to 500 houses, with about 3,000 people. Findings indicate trade in agricultural products and possibly amber.

The great storm known as the Grote Mandrenke (Store Manddrukning), sometimes also named after the saint Marcellus, occurred on 15 or 16 January 1362. Estimates put the number of deaths at around 25,000. Possibly 30 settlements were destroyed, and the coastline shifted east, leaving formerly inhabited land in the tidal Wadden Sea.

The vulnerability of the settlement to the storm tide has been attributed to agricultural development:

"It was like a natural landscape of peat bogs and fenland. It was very uninhabitable, and they completely colonized it. They completely changed the landscape," ... "Once you remove all this peat and get the water out, you have very, very rich soils that are perfect for agriculture [but] "with rising sea levels and increasing storminess, one day these dikes they built were not sufficient enough, and these settlements just drowned."

== Legends and later reception ==
Sometimes referred to as the "Atlantis of the North Sea", the Rungholt of legend was a large, rich town, with the catastrophe supposedly a divine punishment for the sins of its inhabitants.

Impressed by the fate of the town, the relics, and not least the legends' excessive descriptions, the German poet Detlev von Liliencron wrote the 1882 poem "Trutz, Blanke Hans" about the lost town, which begins: Heut bin ich über Rungholt gefahren, die Stadt ging unter vor sechshundert Jahren. ("Today I traveled over Rungholt; the town sank 600 years ago.").

The Sinbadventurers (German: Die Hamburger Sindbadauken) is an opera for children composed by Benjamin Gordon with a libretto by Francis Hüsers. It was commissioned by the Hamburg State Opera and was first performed on February 8, 2015. In the opera, three children set out to discover the lost gold of Rungholt. In the Interlude before the final act, the main character, Lotte, tries desperately to warn the citizens of Rungholt of their impending destruction by reciting verses from Liliencron's ballad.

German singer Achim Reichel put Liliencron's poem to music on his 1977 album Regenballade.

German band Santiano released a song called "Rungholt" in their 2015 CD "Von Liebe, Tod und Freiheit". It also includes verses from von Liliencron's poem.

Theodor Storm mentions Rungholt in his novella Eine Halligfahrt.

Christian Kracht mentions Rungholt in his novella Faserland.

Ursula Hegi mentions Rungholt in her 2020 novel The Patron Saint of Pregnant Girls.

Local myth has it that one can still hear the church bells of Rungholt ringing underwater when sailing through the area on a calm night.

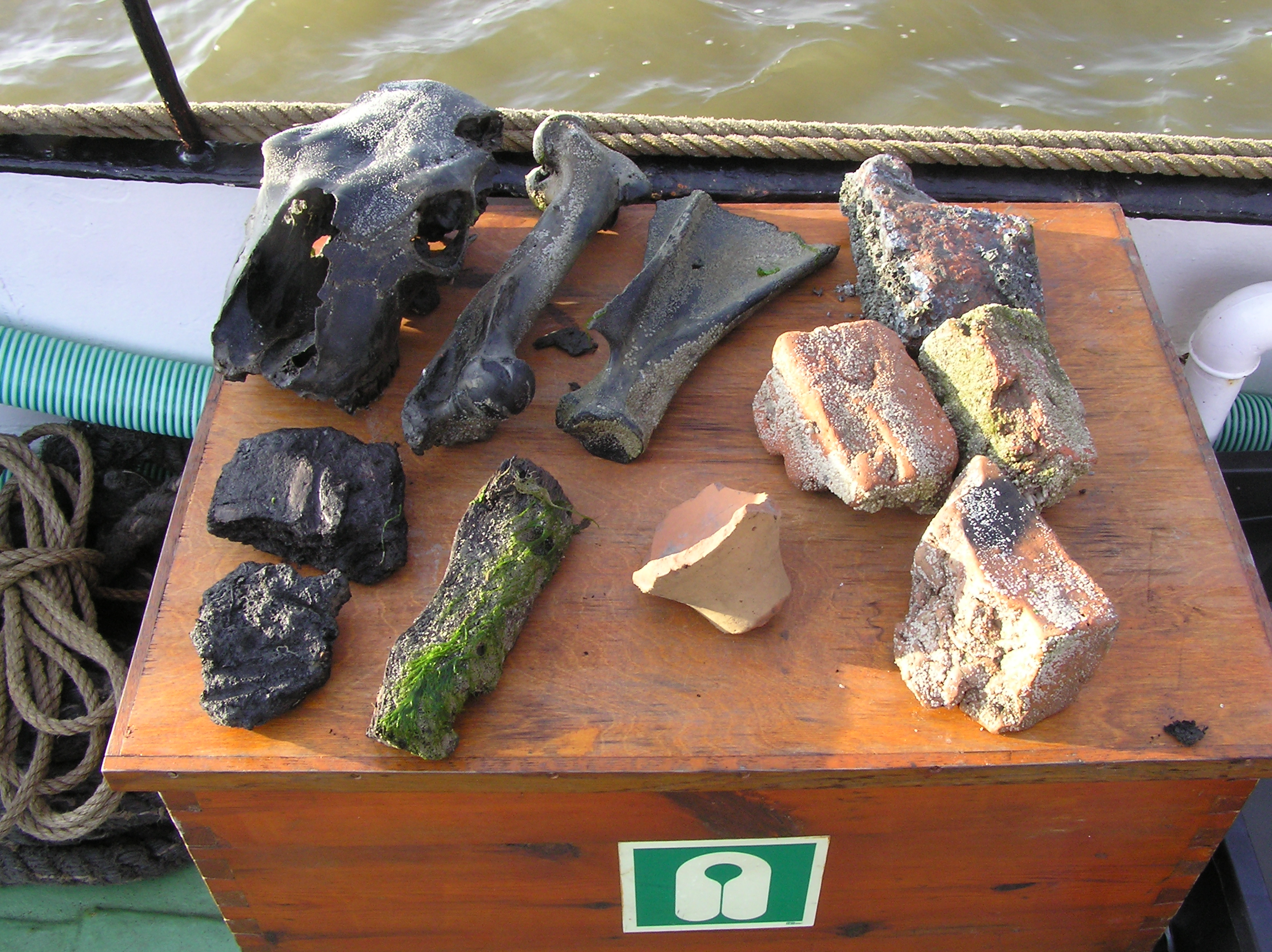
Finds from the Wadden Sea, possibly from Rungholt

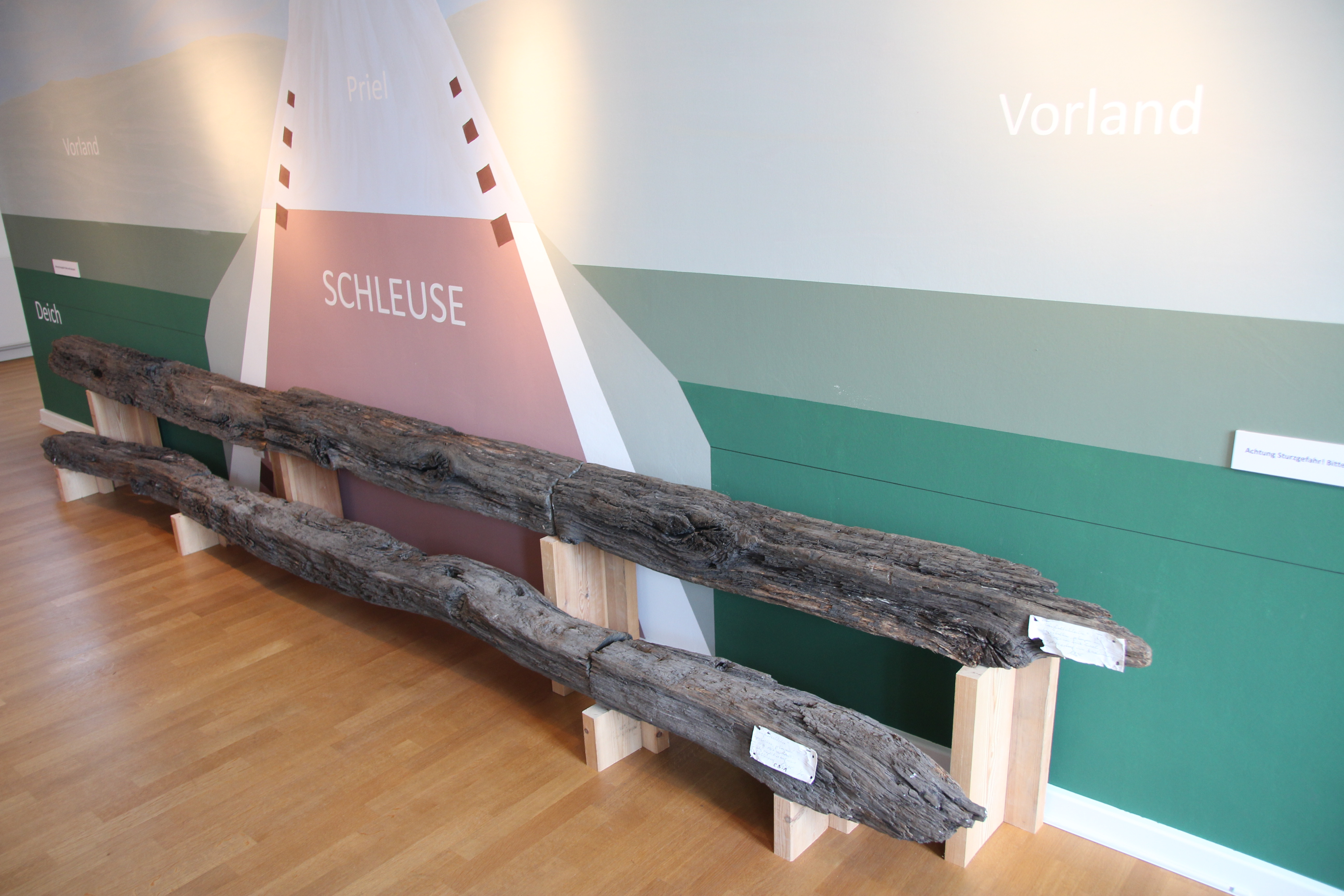
Pieces of wood found in the tidal flats, possibly from Rungholt, at display in the Nordsee Museum Husum

== See also ==
- Lost city
- Dunwich
- Ravenser Odd
- Saeftinghe
