= North Sea flood of 1978 =

Storm surge on the east coast of England

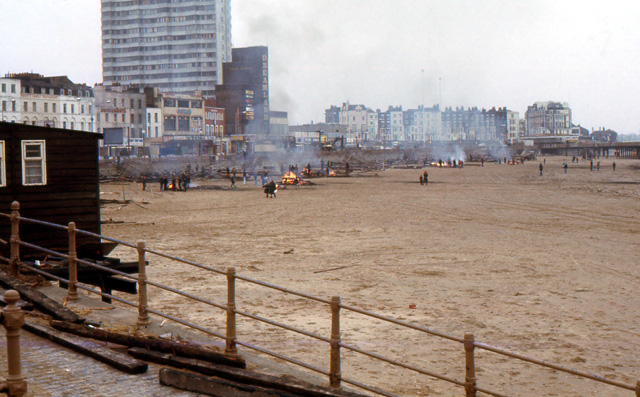
- Margate jetty was badly damaged by the storm of 11–12 January 1978 leaving the beach littered with debris, piles of it were collected up and burned on the beach.

Meteorological history
- Formed: 11 January 1978
- Dissipated: 12 January 1978

Storm surge
- Lowest pressure: 976 hPa (28.8 inHg)

Overall effects
- Fatalities: 1
- Areas affected: United Kingdom, Belgium, France, Netherlands.

The North Sea flood of 1978 was a storm surge which occurred over 11–12 January causing extensive coastal flooding and considerable damage on the east coast of England between the Humber and Kent. Higher water levels were reached than during the devastating North Sea flood of 1953 from North Shields to King's Lynn, but values were lower towards the Thames. Locally severe flooding occurred in Lincolnshire, The Wash, north Norfolk and Kent. Improvements in flood protection following the devastating flood of 1953 meant that the catastrophic losses seen during that storm were not repeated. The storm caused severe damage to many piers along the east coast of England.

== Meteorological history ==
On 10 January 1978 a small wave depression formed in the Atlantic around 54N 15W in a trough extending from a depression close to SW Iceland. This low deepened and moved towards Ireland and then merged with the parent low deepening to 986 hPa close to the Isle of Man. The next day the depression moved over the UK and the pressure gradient increased. Strong winds affected the north and east coast of England.

=== Warnings and preparation ===
Flood warnings were issued two to three hours before the highest water levels in the coastal towns of Lincolnshire. Clement Freud the Member of Parliament for North East Cambridgeshire called for an inquiry into the failure of the flood warnings in East Anglia. The Junior Minister Shirley Summerskill reported that an "Alert" message was received by Police in Wisbech at 0705 hours and a further message at 1414 hours confirming that there was danger of tidal flooding at 1928 hours. On receipt of the second message, the Fenland District Council was notified immediately. The message was passed simultaneously to the Anglian Water Authority by the Cambridgeshire Constabulary headquarters. Gavin Strang of the Ministry of Agriculture, Fisheries and Food responded that the storm tide warning service issued an alert to the Norfolk Police at 0625 hours and a warning at 1318 hours on 11 January in relation to the Norfolk coast as far east as Mundesley. An alert for the coastal area to the East and South of Mundesley was issued at 1150 hours and a warning at 1810 hours. The police are responsible for passing on these messages to other authorities.

== Impact ==
=== Humberside and Lincolnshire ===
In Humberside a police car was swept away by the rising waters at Spurn Point. In Cleethorpes a total of 1,500 houses were affected by flooding during the event. 1,017 houses were flooded above floor level, a further 185 houses were flooded below floor level and 288 houses had their gardens flooded. It was estimated that £1,600,000 (1978) worth of damage was caused to private property and goods in Cleethorpes. One of the big differences between 1978 and the storm surge during the Gale of January 1976 in the town, was that damage occurred much further inland. Damage was reported up to three-quarters of a mile away from the sea wall. In Cleethorpes the damage spread over an area of 5 km^{2} (1.9 sq mi) in total. The railway between Grimsby and Cleethorpes was left inoperable as the ballast was washed out from under the track. Further south on the Lincolnshire coast the resorts of Sandilands and Mablethorpe saw 28 homes and 8 business premises left underwater, with caravans and chalets along the Lincolnshire coast damaged. In Boston, Lincolnshire following the failure of a brick retaining wall, St Botolph's Church and 180 houses were flooded. Waters in the church exceeded the levels seen in 1953.

In Sutton Bridge Wharf Street and Customhouse Street flooded as water overflowed the banks of the River Nene.

=== East Anglia ===
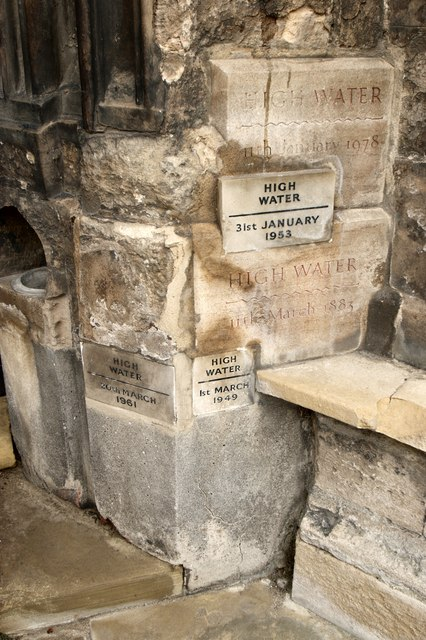
Close-up of the flood markers, at the western entrance door of St Margaret's Church, King's Lynn that denote the extraordinary heights to which flood water rose at certain times in history, the highest being in 1978, which was due to a North Sea surge

In Cambridgeshire extensive flooding was reported in Wisbech, including the Clarkson Geriatric Day Hospital, which had to be closed for weeks as repairs were made (the hospital closed permanently in 1983). A 70-year-old woman was reported drowned in her flooded home in Wisbech after the River Nene burst its banks on both Brinks forcing 1000 people to evacuate their homes. The home of photographer Geoff Hastings was flooded destroying thousands of photos taken over two decades, years later the negatives were found on a shelf untouched by floodwater and archived in Wisbech & Fenland Museum. Staff at the Wisbech Standard, having been warned of a potential flood, went to one of the town's bridges and saw the waters rise, then recede, thinking the town had narrowly escaped they returned home, not realising until the morning that the town's west and north wards had flooded.

In Norfolk, King's Lynn suffered worse flooding in 1978 than in the storm of 1953. The Ouse overflowed onto the Quays, King Street and the town's medieval quarter. The town centre was left underwater causing damage totalling millions of pounds. 1978 flood level recorded in St Margaret's church in the town were at 1190mm. The costs of damage in King's Lynn though were less than during 1953 flood.

The storm surge breached the shingle ridge to the south of Heacham and the sea wall at Heacham North Beach, resulting in significant damage to property. Hundreds of caravans near to Snettisham and Hunstanton were overturned by the storm, with damage to caravans also occurring in Wolferton.

In Wells-next-the-Sea two major breaches occurred, flooding the adjacent marshes, damaging beach huts and grounding a 300-ton coaster on Wells quay car park. The storm washed away over ½ mile (800 m) of track of the Wells Harbour Railway. Severe flooding was reported at Walcott though no major flooding was reported in Great Yarmouth.

Along the coast in Suffolk, Lowestoft reported no major flooding, but noted increased erosion of cliffs around Benacre and Covehithe during the event. In Southwold the pavilion and some beach huts along the esplanade were damaged. In Aldeburgh 25 properties flooded and 40 properties were reported as flooded in Felixstowe. Major storm damage to the hamlet of Felixstowe Ferry was reported, with cars destroyed, boats stranded and houseboats damaged. with the next high tide due at 2.30 there were fears that the promenade and homes could flood, a full-scale emergency response was put into action, filling sandbags to stop the flood entering homes on the sea front.

In Essex, Harwich and Dovercourt saw parts of the town quay and approach roads flooded. South Essex was sheltered from the main force of wind, with some breaches in rural locations, but compared to 1953 damages were light.

=== London ===
In East London no major damage was experienced, the steel and rubber floodgates designed to protect the major London docks were closed for the first time since their completion in 1972. Dikes reinforced 4 years previously prevented flooding in London, Flood waters rose 5 inches above the previous defences. with sea levels being half a metre below the new defence levels.

=== Kent ===
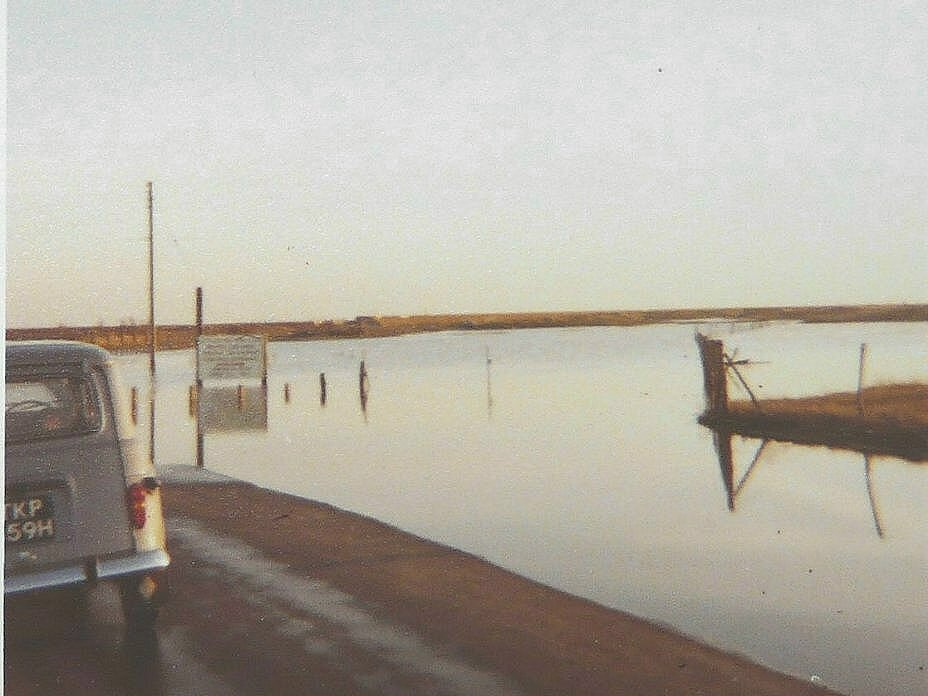
Coastal flooding at Littlestone Golf Club, St Mary's Bay, Kent 1978

The 1978 storm surge was estimated to be a 1 in 20 year event in Kent. The Isle of Sheppey saw extensive damage, with the island cut off from the mainland by flooding and snow. At Shellness Hamlet around 400 ha of land was flooded to a depth of 1.5m. Serious disruption due to flooding also occurred in Sheerness.

In the Swale district of Kent the tidal defences along the western marshes (Barksore, Chetney and Horsham) were overtopped, along with the defences north of Faversham. In addition the tidal defences around the Isle of Harty were breached resulting in flooding around the Isle. The sea defences were breached east of The Lilies (NE of Sittingbourne) with flooding occurring along Conyer Creek. Flooding also occurred further up Faversham Creek, but this was considered to be fluvial. No residential or business property was reported as being flooded.

The storm brought considerable damage to the Seaview Caravan and Chalet Park in Swalecliffe due to overtopping of the sea defences. There was also damage from overtopping of flood defences at Pegwell Bay, between Ramsgate and Sandwich on the east coast of Kent. Flooding was also reported to the northwest and southeast of Sandwich, Kent. Families were evacuated by boat from Deal, Kent. Coastal flooding continued around the Kent coast into the English Channel with water coming over the top of sea defences at St Mary's Bay, Kent on Romney Marsh.

=== East coast pier damage ===
Cleethorpes Pier saw 150 disabled people and pensioners stranded in the town's pier, which withstood the waves largely without significant damage. In Skegness the storm washed away two large sections of the pier and left the theatre isolated at the seaward end. Plans to link the two sections by monorail, and to build a new 1200-seat theatre and a 250-foot tower all fell through later that year when an application for financial assistance was rejected. In Hunstanton most of the pier was destroyed by the storm, with a small section at the end removed by the council some weeks later. The shoreward end amusement arcade survived, along with one set of piles. The iron legs of Hunstanton pier were found later washed up 8 km to the south. The Southwold Pier was damaged. Herne Bay Pier saw the main deck destroyed leaving only a short section intact and the pier-head isolated out at sea. Margate jetty (to distinguish from stone harbour walls) which had been closed since 1976 because of safety issues was virtually destroyed by the 11 January 1978 storm surge isolating the lifeboat station. Following the storm the RAF air sea rescue Wessex helicopter from Manston, landed some of the lifeboat crew onto the station and after checking for damage to the lifeboat slipway, the boat was launched and taken to Ramsgate.
