= Saint Marcellus's flood =

Storm surge in the North Sea in 1362

Meteorological history
- Duration: 13 January 1362

Overall effects
- Fatalities: 25,000–100,000
- Areas affected: British Isles, Netherlands, Northern Germany and Denmark

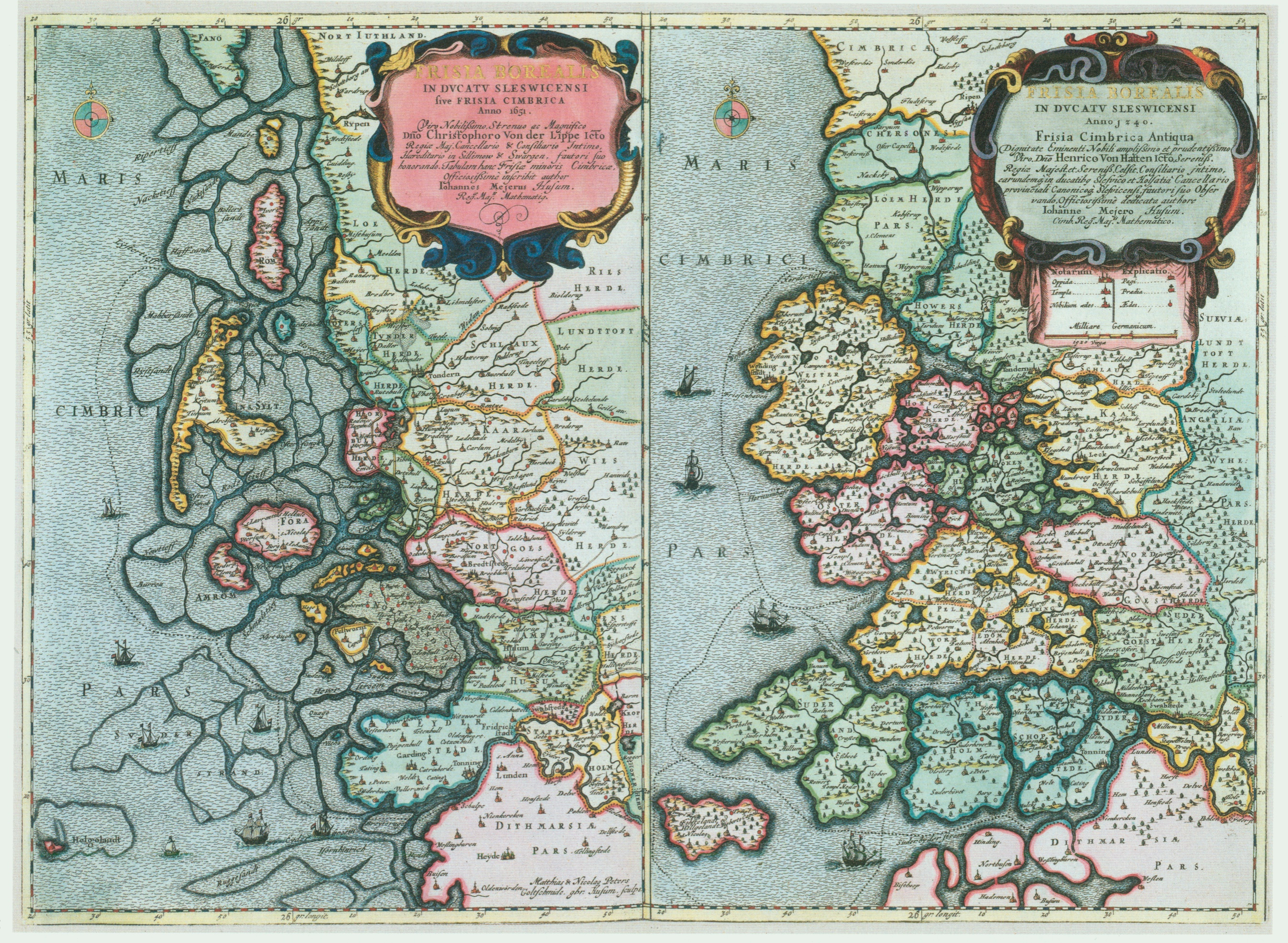
North Frisia's coastline in 1651 (left) and 1240 (right)

Saint Marcellus's flood or Grote Mandrenke (Middle Low German pronunciation: [ɣroːtə mandrɛŋkə]; Danish: Den Store Manddrukning, 'Great Drowning of Men') was an intense extratropical cyclone that killed at least 25,000 people and, coinciding with a new moon, swept across the British Isles, the Netherlands, northern Germany, and Denmark (including Schleswig/Southern Jutland) around 16 January 1362. The storm tide is also called the "Second St. Marcellus flood" because it peaked on 16 January, the feast day of St. Marcellus. A previous "First St. Marcellus flood" had drowned 36,000 people along the coasts of West Friesland and Groningen on 16 January 1219.

== Background and meteorological synopsis ==
In the Medieval Warm Period, storms were stronger and sea levels were higher compared to the pre-industrial average due to higher temperatures. The storm arrived with northwesterly winds and a spring tide caused by the arrangement of the sun-earth-moon system, further increasing the sea levels. Dikes had been built to prevent flooding, but were in disrepair due to the Black Death. The constructed preventative measures decreased area able to be inundated while tidal variation increased through the early second millennium.

== Impact ==
An immense storm tide from the North Sea swept far inland from England and the Netherlands to Denmark and the German coast, breaking up islands, making parts of the mainland into islands, and wiping out entire towns and districts. These included Rungholt, said to have been located on the island of Strand in North Frisia, Ravenser Odd in East Yorkshire, and the harbour of Dunwich in Suffolk. Some areas of cultivated land were also turned into tidal flats. The storm destroyed a total of 44 villages. At least 25,000 people died, with estimates going as high as 100,000.

This storm tide, along with others of like size in the 13th century and 14th century, played a part in the formation of the Zuiderzee, and was characteristic of the unsettled and changeable weather in northern Europe at the beginning of the Little Ice Age.

== See also ==
- Floods in the Netherlands
- Storm tides of the North Sea
