= History of Margate =

Margate was a "limb" of Dover in the ancient confederation of the Cinque ports. It was added to the confederation in the 15th century.

== Margate and the sea ==
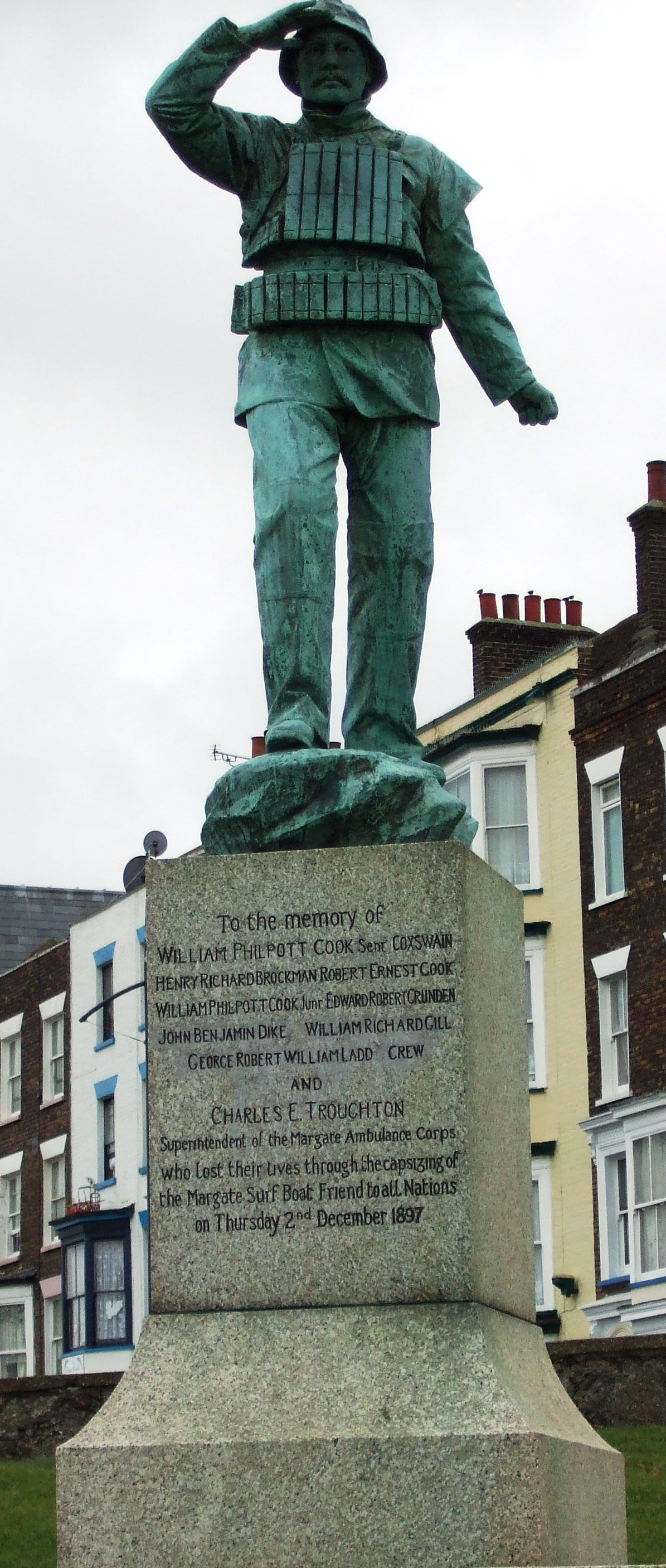
Memorial to the coxswain and crew of the Friend to all Nations, Nayland Rocks, Margate

Margate has been a leading seaside resort for at least 250 years. Like its neighbours Ramsgate and Broadstairs it has been a traditional holiday destination for Londoners drawn to its sandy beaches.

Edward Hasted, writing in the 18th century, described Margate as a "poor fishing town", but in 1810, when describing the shore, he wrote: "... [it] was so well adapted to bathing, being an entire level and covered with the finest sand, which extends for several miles on either side of the harbour... [near which] there are several commodious bathing rooms, out of which the bathers are driven in the machines, any depth along the sands into the sea; at the back of the machine is a door, through which the bathers descend a few steps into the water, and an umbrella of canvas dropping over conceals them from the public view. Upwards of 40 of these machines are frequently employed..."

The town's history is tied closely to the sea and it has a proud maritime tradition. The record of the vessel, Friend to all Nations, and the Margate Surfboat disaster of 1897 are noteworthy events in Margate's past.

== Steamboats ==
About 1816 The Times reported that the introduction of steamboats had given the whole coast of Kent (and) the Isle of Thanet in particular, "a prodigious lift". However, Sir Rowland Hill (creator of the 1840 Penny Post), while in Thanet during 1815, remarked: "It is surprising to see how most people are prejudiced against this packet." So popular were the steam boat excursions that in 1841 there were six different companies competing for the Margate passenger traffic. Even with the advent of the railway in 1846 the steamboats continued in service until their final withdrawal in 1967.

In 1820 it was said that "the inhabitants of Margate ought to eulogise the name of Watt, as the founder of their good fortune; and steam vessels as the harbingers of their prosperity".

== Railways ==
The railway came to Margate via two separate companies. The South Eastern Railway (SER) was the first to reach the town when its branch line from the main line at Ashford, having opened to Ramsgate on 13 April 1846, was continued to a station called Margate Sands on 1 December the same year. It was not direct, however: trains had to reverse from the terminus at Ramsgate to reach Margate. In spite of that, crowds of people added to the already high numbers coming by sea. The SER had the rail monopoly until 5 October 1863, the London, Chatham and Dover Railway completed its North Kent coast line and opened a station at Margate West. Once the Southern Railway had been formed, in 1923, there was a major rationalisation of the Isle of Thanet railways: the old route from Ramsgate was closed completely and a new railway connection, looping round the Isle of Thanet, meant that trains could pass through the town from either direction. Margate West (renamed simply Margate) Station became the only railway station in the town. The Railway is now run by Southeastern.

== Royal School for Deaf Children ==
England's first public institution for deaf children known as 'London Asylum for the Education of the Deaf and Dumb Children of the Poor' was started in London in 1792. The School opened its branch in Margate (August 1876) and later on, moved the entire operation from London to Margate. The School's Westgate College for Deaf People, for students aged 16 and over, closed on 11 December 2015. An inspection the previous month by the Care Quality Commission uncovered what the inspectors called "shocking examples of institutionalised failings and abuse" and the trust running the schools subsequently went into administration.

== Margate Jetty ==
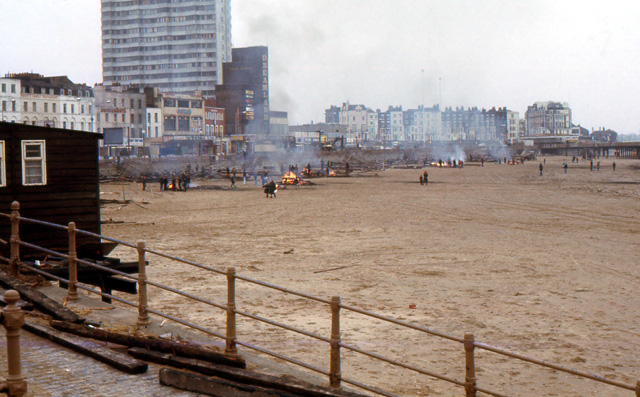
Burning debris from destroyed Margate Jetty 1978

Margate Jetty, also known as Margate Pier, which was designed by Eugenius Birch in 1856, has suffered damage from the sea over the years. On 1 January 1877 it was sliced through by a storm-driven wreck that marooned 40 to 50 people. They were not rescued until the next day. The pier survived until 11–12 January 1978, when it was hit by another storm. The storm washed up the planks from the pier onto Margate Beach. The wreck of the pier remained for several years, surviving several attempts to blow it up, before final demolition.

Margate Jetty is now categorised as a lost pier.

Margate Marine & Pier was a ward of Margate until 1974.

== Wherries ==
Between 1890 and 1939 about 30 pleasure boats operated from Margate beach. The main builder of these Thanet wherries was Brockman's of Margate, which turned them out in large numbers before World War I. It developed two distinct types of boats: the wherry proper, with high sides, and the wherry punt, with low sides. The hulls were traditionally varnished, a practice employed by boatmen from Thanet to Devon. Some boatmen put a wider beam into the design to assist fishing. Although employing a clinker-built hull, the shape was similar to the Deal galley and the Thames waterman's skiff.

The last wherry in service at Margate was operated by a Dusty Miller of Westgate-on-Sea (a suburb of Margate), and built by an apprentice at Brockman's of Margate in 1939. "She was only about 12 ft long and being small was sometimes called a skiff."

== Margate during the Second World War ==
On 3 September 1940, at 0950 hours pilot officer Richard Hillary was shot down during combat against three Messerschmitts. He landed in the sea near the North Foreland, and was rescued by the Margate lifeboat. His Spitfire (RAF serial number X4277) had burst into flames and he was badly burned. Hillary, the grandson of the founder of the lifeboat service Sir William Hillary, recovered from his ordeal and later wrote the book The Last Enemy. He was killed in a training flight accident in 1943, aged 24.

Howard Primrose Knight, coxswain of the Ramsgate lifeboat Prudential, and Edward Duke Parker, (nearly always incorrectly stated as Edward DRAKE Parker), coxswain of the Margate lifeboat Lord Southborough (ON 688), were both awarded the Distinguished Service Medal in recognition of their gallantry and determination when ferrying troops from the beaches of Dunkirk during the evacuation of 1940.

The lifeboats had assisted in retrieving at least 2,800 men, by towing eight wherries, during a continuous service lasting 40 hours. Following this achievement the Margate boat returned to Dunkirk to rescue 500–600 French soldiers from the beach.

In a letter to the RNLI, the Commander of HMS Icarus stated: "The manner in which the Margate lifeboat crew brought off load after load of soldiers under continuous shelling, bombing and aerial machine-gun fire, will be an inspiration to us all as long as we live."

There were 35 people killed, with 595 high explosive bombs, 2 shells, and 5 parachute mines. 238 buildings were destroyed.

== Storm of 1949 ==
The storm of early March 1949 caused widespread damage in Margate and along the North Kent Coast. Kent Fire Brigade estimated that it took 1,550 man hours to fight the floods which had devastated Kent in the previous two weeks. The high tide caused flooding at various points between Margate and Crayford. The tidal surge swept down the North Sea, into the Thames Estuary and up the river valleys, reaching 15 miles (24 km) inland. So bad was the flooding that Chatham, Rochester, Strood, Upnor, Gravesend, Sheerness, Sittingbourne, Faversham, Herne Bay, Whitstable, Dover and Margate were declared one incident.

== Dreamland and the Scenic Railway ==
Scenic Railway, 1930s

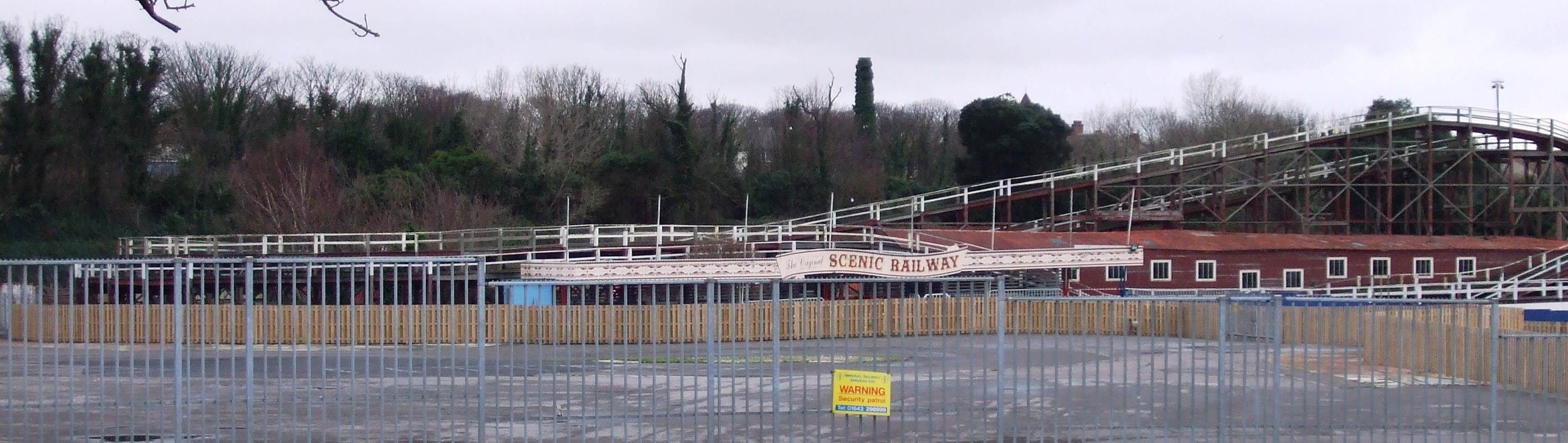
The disused Scenic Railway in December 2007

Dreamland amusement park was established in the 1920s and is home to the oldest roller coaster in the UK, namely the wooden Scenic Railway. Dreamland and the Scenic Railway were closed at the end of the 2006 season, and reopened in 2015 following rejuvenation of the park and full restoration of the Scenic Railway.

== Windmills ==
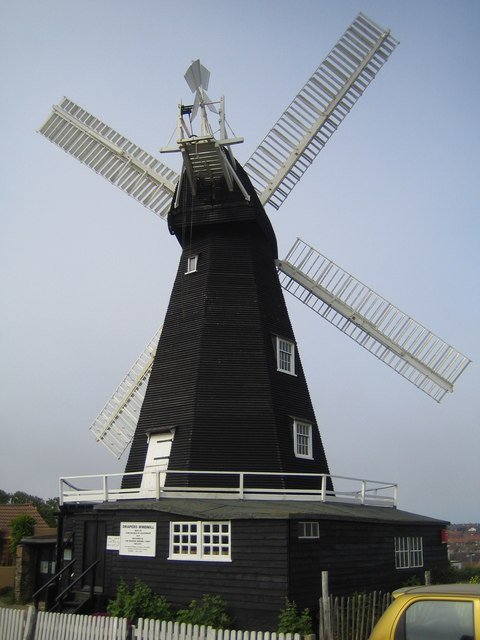
Draper's Mill

Margate has been served by several windmills over the centuries.

Humber's (or Chamber's) Mill

This mill was marked on Robert Morden's map of 1695, Harris's map of 1719 and Bowen's map of 1736. It was at Lydden, to the north east of Fleete village.

Town Mill

This mill was marked on Harris's map of 1719 and the 1858–72 OS map. It was known to be working in 1889.

Hooper's Mill

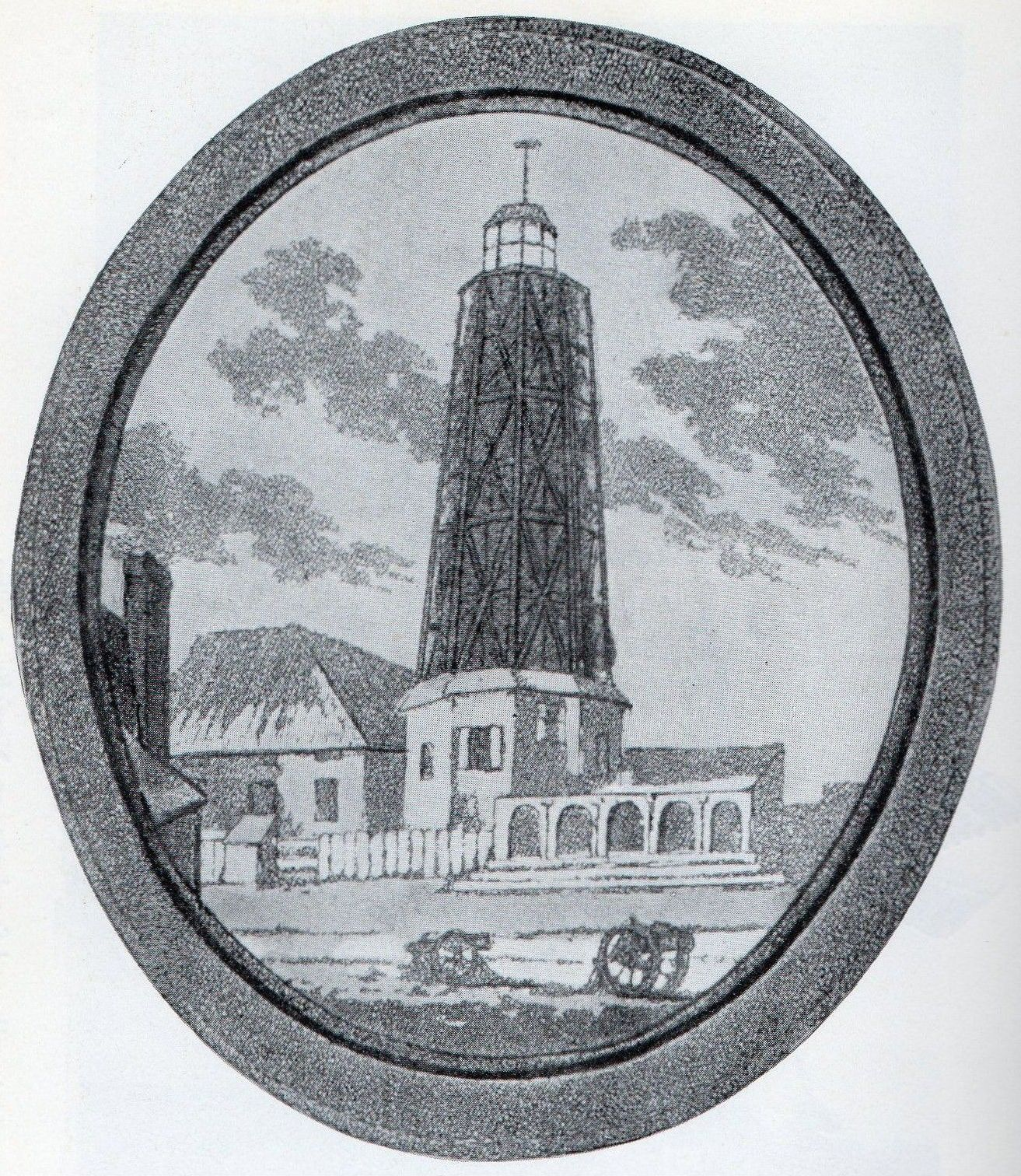
Hooper's Mill

A horizontal windmill built by Stephen Hooper at the end of the eighteenth century. Its location was between Dane Hill and Margate Caves. The date of erection is not known, but it would seem to have been in existence by March 1791, when there was an advert in the Kentish Gazette in relation to the patent vanes used in the mill. The mill was demolished circa 1828. An illustration of the mill in Rees's Cyclopædia shows that the windmill had forty vertical sail blades mounted on the vertical Windshaft-cum-Upright Shaft. It drove three pairs of overdrift millstones. One pair was driven directly from the Great Spur Wheel, and another two pairs were driven by a further Spur Wheel on an Upright Shaft driven by the Great Spur Wheel.

Nayland Mill

This mill was marked on the 1801 OS map. It was moved to the position later occupied by Draper's Mill, thus would have been demolished in the 1840s.

Draper's Mill

Built in 1845 by John Holman, this smock mill was working by wind until 1916 and by engine until the late 1930s. It was saved from demolition and is now restored and open to the public.

Little Draper's Mill

This smock mill was moved from a site near Barham railway station in 1869. It was demolished in 1929, leaving just the base which itself was demolished in 1954.

Pumping Mill

This brick tower mill was first marked on the 1858-72 Ordnance Survey (OS) map. It was built with five sails, but after being tailwinded in 1878 it was rebuilt with four sails. The mill was tailwinded again in August 1894. Repairs were estimated to cost £275 but were not carried out. The tower stood capless for a few years after and was demolished early in the twentieth century.
