= Margate Surfboat =

Coordinates: 51°24′N 1°22′E

The Margate surfboat refers to three surfboats used for maritime rescue at Margate, on the eastern tip of Kent. They were run as cooperatives, with local boatmen clubbing together to buy them and then receiving a share of any salvage money received.

The first, the Friend of all Nations was wrecked in 1860 but returned to service until 1877. Nine crew of the second boat, Friend to all Nations, died in the storm of 1897, but the boat survived both that and being lost while under tow the following year. A memorial to the nine men stands on the Margate seafront.

A third boat was built in 1899 but by then surfboats powered by oar and sail had been largely superseded by lifeboats. The third boat served as a tender at Chatham during the Second World War and was lost off Ostend in 1957. All three were built by J. Samuel White of Cowes.

== Friend of all Nations ==
After the dramatic rescue in January 1857 of the crew of the Northern Belle in which the Margate lugger Victory was lost with all hands, 50 boatmen decided to establish a dedicated surfboat service for maritime rescue.

This first boat, the Friend of all Nations could be launched by four men without the need of horses and entered service in November 1857.

She was almost wrecked on 13 February 1860 attempting to rescue the crew of the Spanish brig Samaritano, which, at about 5.30am, ran onto the Margate Sands in a squall. The alarm was sounded at daybreak by the lugger Eclipse, which sent eight men onto the brig, in the hope that she could be refloated at high tide. However the gale returned and they soon gave up hope of saving the ship. The small Margate boat was launched, but in their haste they did not secure their buoyancy tanks and were driven ashore, barely afloat, in Westgate Bay. Then the Friend of all Nations was launched but it too was overpowered by the storm and was driven onshore about a mile west of Margate. Eventually all those on the remains of the Samaritano were rescued by the Ramsgate lifeboat.

The Friend capsized during a rescue in January 1866 and her crew spent 85 minutes in the winter seas before they were rescued. She saved the lives of 38 men from 6 ships in the great storm of November 1877, but the damage inflicted during the rescues led to her retirement.

== Friend to all Nations ==
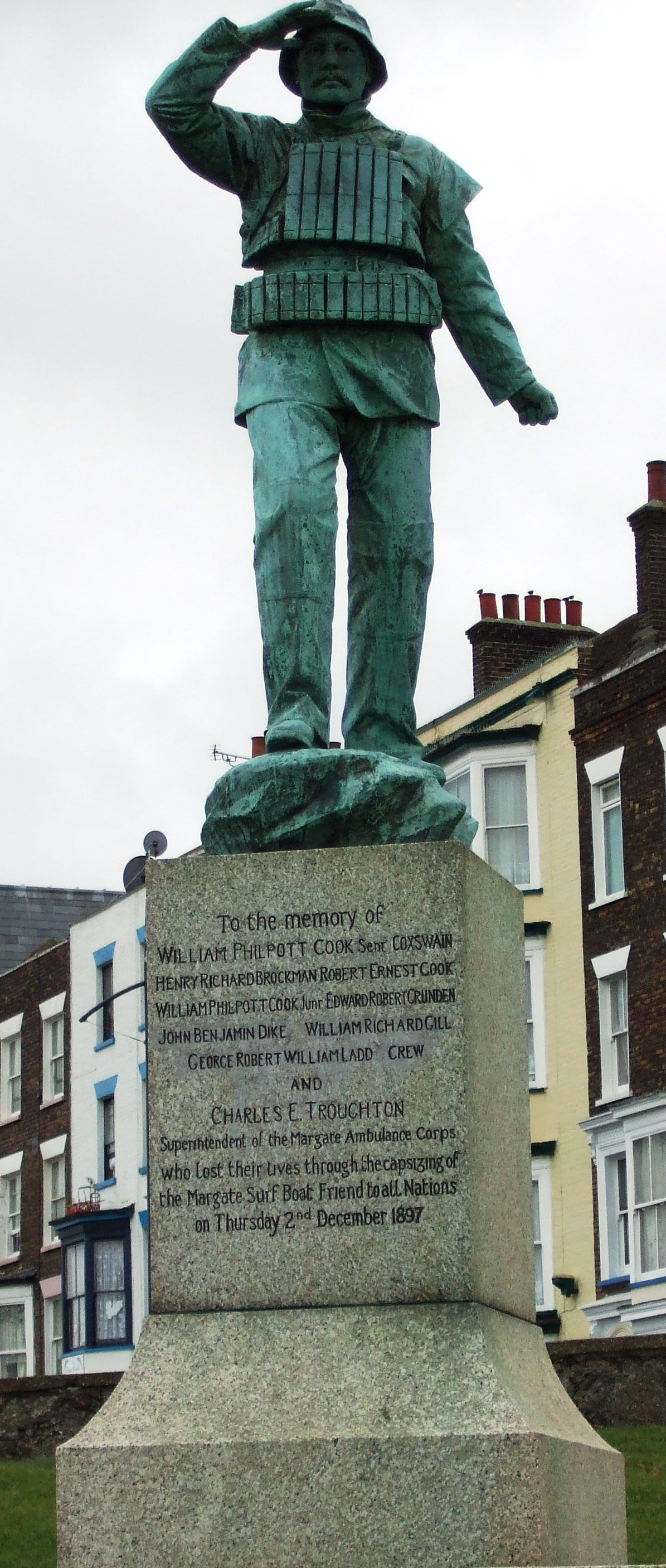
Memorial to the Friend to all Nations, Margate

The Friend of all Nations being unfit for further service, funds were raised for a replacement. This new boat, the Friend to all Nations, was also built at White's and arrived in Margate on 6 July 1878.

The Friend to all Nations became famous in the great storm of 1897, which damaged much of Margate and destroyed the Switchback Railway. On the morning of 2 December 1897, thirteen men set out in the surfboat towards the struggling Persian Empire. However the Friend was hit by two waves in quick succession and capsized just off the Nayland Rock. Just four men made it to shore, of whom the medic Charles Troughton died on reaching land. The remaining nine were all beaten to a pulp on the rocks, except for Joseph Epps who was found underneath the capsized boat. Memorials were raised to the nine dead on the parade above Nayland Rock, and in Margate Cemetery.

The boat itself was not badly damaged and returned to service. However she was lost on 30 November 1898. She was not used again.

== 1899 boat ==
A new boat was commissioned from White's, which was delivered in September 1899. This much larger boat was also called Friend to all Nations.

One of her most notable rescues was that of 26 people from the sailing ship Marechal Suchet. In 1922 she was motorised following public donations.

She continued in service at Margate until the Second World War.

After the war, she made her final journey in 1957.

== See also ==
- Penlee lifeboat disaster
- Southport and St Anne's lifeboats disaster
- Emptage & the Moss Rose
