= Iain Aitch =

English writer, journalist and artist

- Born: Margate, Kent, England
- Occupations: Writer, journalist, artist
- Writing career
- Genres: Travel, humor
- Notable works: A Fête Worse Than Death, We're British, Innit
- Website: www.iainaitch.com

Iain Aitch is an English writer, journalist and artist who lives in London.

He is the author of the travel book A Fête Worse Than Death, a humorous first person journey through an English summer, and We're British, Innit, a humorous lexicon about Britain. He has contributed to at least ten more titles.

He writes articles for The Guardian and The Daily Telegraph and has also written for a diverse selection of magazines, including Dwell, Bizarre, Dazed and The Idler.

Aitch was born in Margate, Kent, and has written extensively about the area and its people. In 2011, he undertook a residency with the newly opened Turner Contemporary gallery, creating a photographic exhibit that was shown in the Margate gallery's Nothing in the World But Youth show and featured in its exhibition catalogue.
