= Margate Town Hall =

Municipal building in Margate, Kent, England

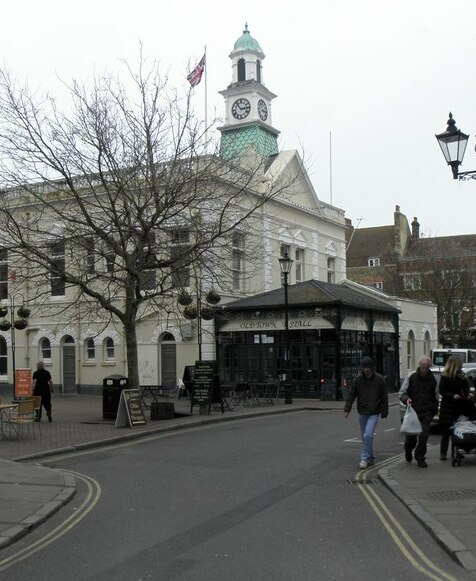
- Margate Town Hall

- Shown in Kent
- 51.3894°N 1.3820°E
- Location: Market Place, Margate

History
- Built: 1898

Site notes
- Architectural style: Neoclassical style

Listed Building – Grade II
- Official name: Old Town Hall and Police Station
- Designated: 22 February 1973
- Reference no.: 1351074

Margate Town Hall is a municipal building in the Market Place, Margate, Kent, England. The complex, which was the headquarters of Margate Borough Council, consists of the two distinct buildings connected by a bridge: it is Grade II listed.

== History ==
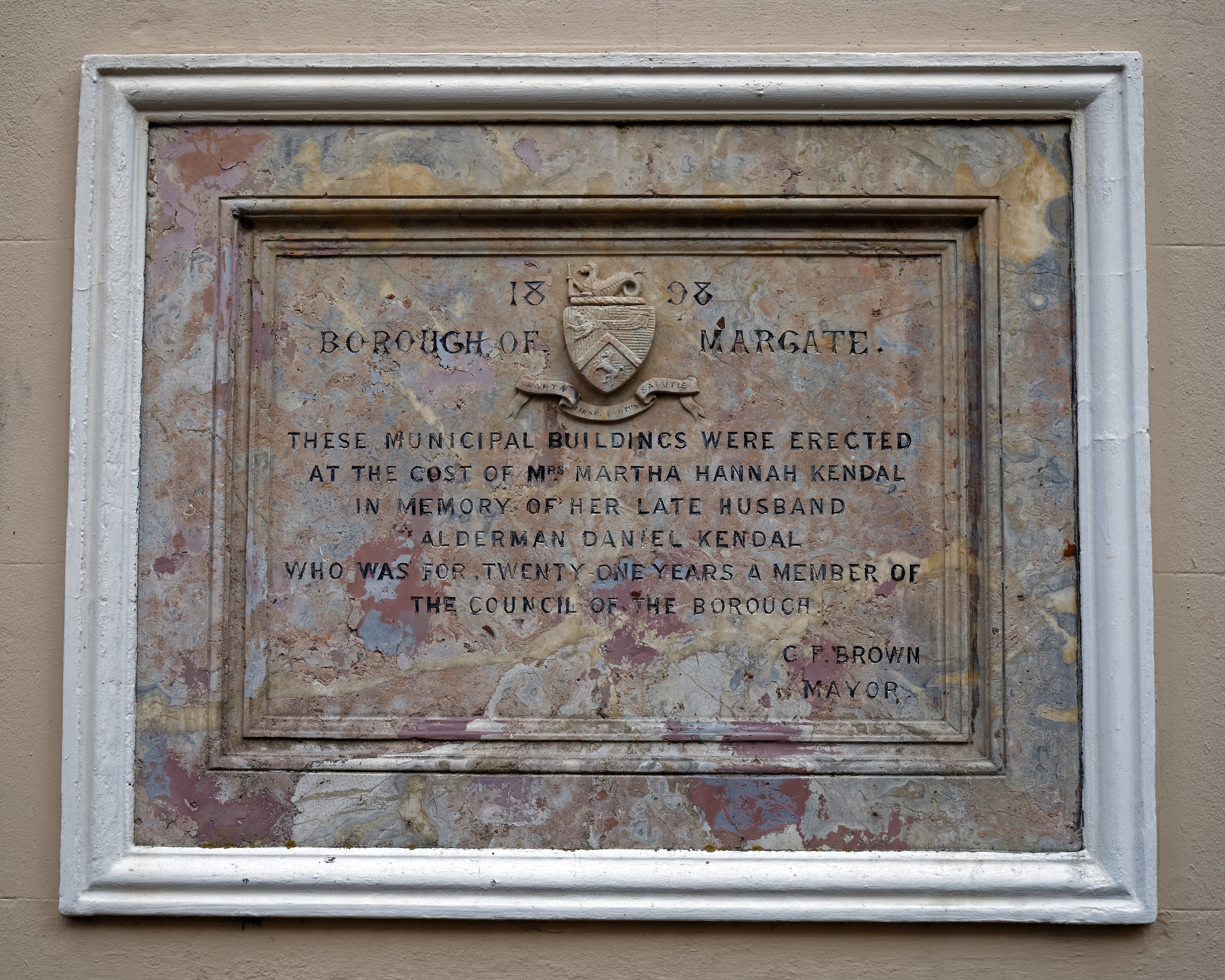
Plaque on the western elevation of the building commemorating its benefactor

After a charter was granted giving permission to hold markets in the town in 1777, an existing building owned by the Cobb family in an area known as the Bowling Green was converted for use as a town hall in 1787. At the same time a new lock-up was built to the north of the town hall. After the original town hall became dilapidated, a new town hall, funded by public subscription, was built on the same site and completed in 1820.

The town became a municipal borough in 1857, and following further population growth, largely associated with seaside tourism, the borough council decided to commission new municipal offices on the same site in the 1890s: this became possible because of a gift from Martha Hannah Kendal, widow of a former local corn merchant, Alderman Daniel Kendal. The new building was designed in the neoclassical style, built with brick rendered with cement and completed in 1898. The design involved a symmetrical main frontage with four bays facing onto the southern edge of the Market Square; the ground floor was arcaded so that markets could be held and featured a cast iron canopy which originally extended the full width of the building. There were sash windows on the first floor with a large pediment above and, at roof level, there was clock with a lantern above. Internally, the principal parts of the building were the courtroom, which was also used as a council chamber, on the first floor and the police station on the ground floor. The police moved out of the complex to a new police station at Fort Hill in 1959.

The building continued to serve as the headquarters of Margate Borough Council for much of the 20th century but ceased to be the local seat of government when the enlarged Thanet District Council established its offices in Cecil Street shortly after it was formed in 1974. The first floor of the front part of the complex subsequently became the home of the mayor and the charter trustees. The rear part of the complex was converted for community use and re-opened as the Margate Museum in 1987. The museum's initial exhibits included a collection of maps and local historical documents collected by Dr Arthur Rowe, which had been left to Margate Corporation when he died in 1926, as well as a series of paintings known as the Parker Collection which was purchased by Margate Corporation in 1929.

The East Kent Maritime Trust took over management of the museum in 1994 and, after a brief closure from 2008 to 2010, it reopened under the management of a team of volunteers. In September 2018, the council considered a proposal to let out the ground floor of the front part of the complex for commercial use.
