= Margate =

Town in East Kent, England

Coordinates: 51.3850°N 1.3838°E

- Seaside town
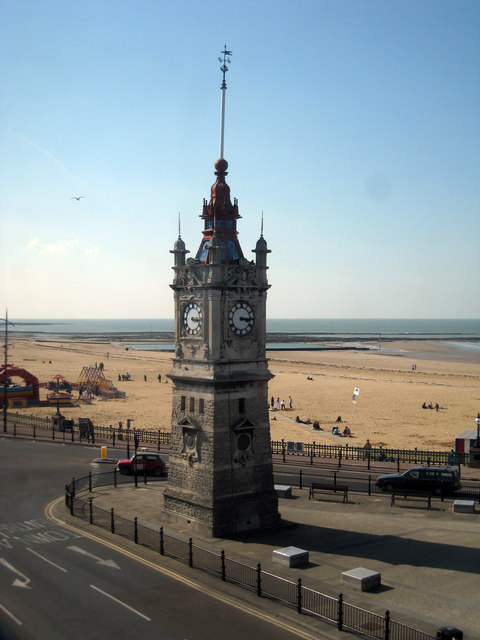
- Margate Clock Tower

- Location within Kent
- Interactive map of Margate
- Population: 63,322 (2021)
- OS grid reference: TR355705
  - London: 65 1/2 mi (105.4 km) W
- Civil parish: Unparished area and charter trustees
- District: Thanet
- Shire county: Kent
- Region: South East
- Country: England
- Sovereign state: United Kingdom
- Post town: MARGATE
- Postcode district: CT9
- Dialling code: 01843
- Police: Kent
- Fire: Kent
- Ambulance: South East Coast
- UK Parliament: East Thanet

Margate (/ˈmɑːrɡeɪt/) is a seaside town in the Thanet District of Kent, England. It is located on the north coast of Kent and covers an area of 2 miles (3 kilometres) long, 16 miles (26 kilometres) north-east of Canterbury and includes Cliftonville, Garlinge, Palm Bay and Westbrook. In 2011 it had a population of 61,223.

The town has been a significant maritime port since the Middle Ages, and was associated with Dover as part of the Cinque Ports in the 15th century. It became a popular place for holidaymakers in the 18th century, owing to easy access via the Thames, and later with the arrival of the railways. Popular landmarks include the sandy beaches and the Dreamland amusement park. During the late 20th century, the town went into decline along with other British seaside resorts, but attempts are being made to revitalise the economy.

== History ==
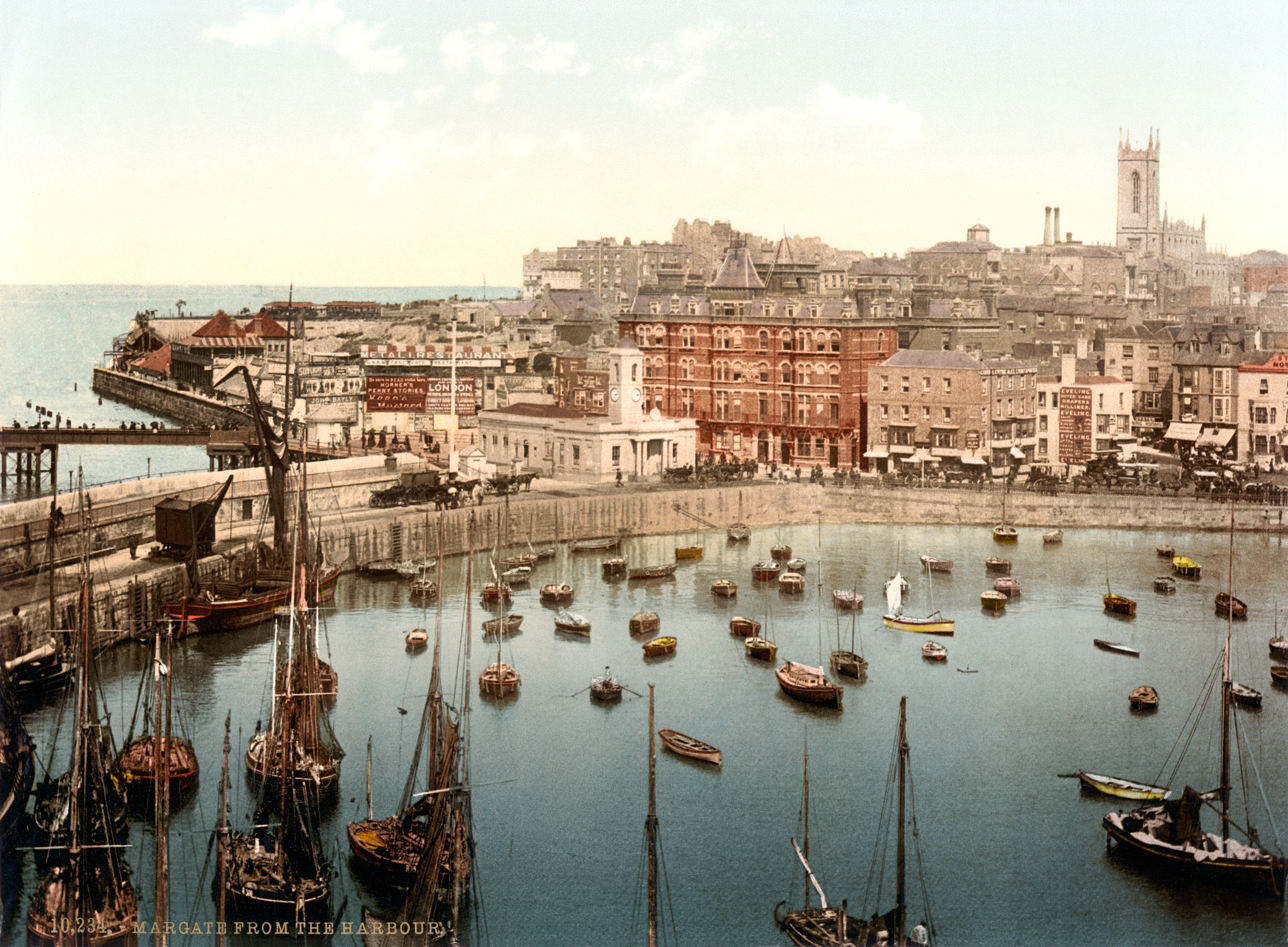
A photochrom print of Margate Harbour in 1897

Margate was listed in the Domesday Book of 1086 as lying within the hundred of Thanet and the county of Kent.

Margate was recorded as "Meregate" in 1264 and as "Margate" in 1299, but the spelling continued to vary into modern times. The name is thought to refer to a pool gate or gap in a cliff where pools of water are found, often allowing swimmers to jump in. The cliffs of the Isle of Thanet are composed of chalk, a fossil-bearing rock.

Margate gives its name to the relatively unknown yet influential Battle of Margate, starting on 24 March 1387, it was the last major naval battle of the Caroline War phase of the Hundred Years' War. Despite the battle being named after Margate, very little actually happened near the coastal town - the battle is named after Margate as this was where an English fleet of 51 vessels that was anchored at Margate Roadstead first spotted a Franco-Castilian-Flemish wine fleet of around 250-360 vessels. The English gave chase after the undermanned wine fleet and finally defeated the fleet a day later on 25 March 1387 off the coast of Cadzand, Zeeland, Netherlands.

The town's history is tied closely to the sea and it has a proud maritime tradition. Margate was a "limb" of Dover in the ancient confederation of the Cinque ports. It was added to the confederation in the 15th century. Margate has been a leading seaside resort for at least 250 years. Like its neighbour Ramsgate, it has been a traditional holiday destination for Londoners drawn to its sandy beaches. Margate had a Victorian jetty which was largely destroyed by a storm in 1978.

In the late 18th century, the town was chosen by the physician John Coakley Lettsom as the place in which he would build the Royal Sea Bathing Hospital, which was the first of its kind in Britain.

Like Brighton and Southend, Margate was infamous for gang violence between mods and rockers in the 1960s, and mods and skinheads in the 1980s.

The Turner Contemporary art gallery occupies a prominent position next to the harbour, and was constructed there with the specific aim of revitalising the town. The Thanet Offshore Wind Project, completed in 2010, is visible from the seafront.

== Governance ==
Margate is an unparished area with charter trustees. In 2021 there was a proposal to convert the unparished area into a civil parish and replace the charter trustees with a town council.

Since 2024, the Member of Parliament for East Thanet has been the Labour MP, Polly Billington.

Margate was incorporated as a municipal borough in 1857. It had several wards, including Margate Marine & Pier. This was abolished in 1974, since which date Margate has been part of the Thanet district of Kent. The town contains the seven electoral wards of Margate Central, Cliftonville West, Cliftonville East (from 1974 to 2003 the ward of Cliftonville), Westbrook, Garlinge, Dane Valley and Salmestone. These wards have seventeen of the fifty six seats on the Thanet District Council. At the 2007 Local Elections, nine of those seats were held by the Conservatives, seven by Labour and one by an Independent.

== Climate ==
Margate experiences an oceanic climate (Köppen climate classification Cfb) similar to much of the United Kingdom. Like almost all of southern Britain, Margate experiences mild temperatures, and is complemented by a high amount of sunshine; a nickname for the town is "Sunny Margate". Rainfall is quite low, making Margate one of the driest towns in Kent.

Climate data for Margate
Month	Jan	Feb	Mar	Apr	May	Jun	Jul	Aug	Sep	Oct	Nov	Dec	Year
Mean daily maximum °C (°F)	7.3 (45.1)	7.4 (45.3)	10.1 (50.2)	12.6 (54.7)	15.8 (60.4)	18.9 (66.0)	21.7 (71.1)	21.9 (71.4)	18.9 (66.0)	14.9 (58.8)	10.7 (51.3)	7.9 (46.2)	14.0 (57.2)
Daily mean °C (°F)	4.5 (40.1)	4.5 (40.1)	6.5 (43.7)	8.4 (47.1)	11.7 (53.1)	14.6 (58.3)	17.1 (62.8)	17.5 (63.5)	15.0 (59.0)	11.5 (52.7)	7.6 (45.7)	5.6 (42.1)	10.4 (50.7)
Mean daily minimum °C (°F)	2.2 (36.0)	1.9 (35.4)	3.6 (38.5)	5.3 (41.5)	8.4 (47.1)	11.2 (52.2)	13.5 (56.3)	13.7 (56.7)	11.8 (53.2)	8.8 (47.8)	5.3 (41.5)	2.9 (37.2)	7.4 (45.3)
Average precipitation mm (inches)	51.2 (2.02)	41.0 (1.61)	36.1 (1.42)	37.8 (1.49)	47.6 (1.87)	46.5 (1.83)	47.4 (1.87)	50.7 (2.00)	48.8 (1.92)	73.7 (2.90)	69.3 (2.73)	62.6 (2.46)	612.6 (24.12)
Mean monthly sunshine hours	65.6	84.1	134.5	195.8	230.8	235.4	242.7	225.3	172.2	122.3	77.3	60.0	1,846
Source 1:
Source 2:

== Demography ==
Margate Compared
2001 UK Census	Margate	Thanet	England
Population	58,400	126,702	49,138,831
Foreign born	5.8%	5.1%	9.2%
White	97%	98%	91%
Asian	1.2%	0.6%	4.6%
Black	0.5%	0.3%	2.3%
Christian	72%	74%	72%
Muslim	0.7%	0.5%	3.1%
Hindu	0.2%	0.2%	1.1%
No religion	17%	16%	15%
Over 65 years old	19%	22%	16%
Under 18 years old	15%	21%	19%

At the 2001 UK census:

Margate had a population of 40,386. The urban area had a population of 46,980 at the 2001 census, increasing to 49,709 at the 2011 census (5.8% increase).

The ethnicity of the town was 97.1% white, 1.0% mixed race, 0.5% black, 0.8% Asian, 0.6% Chinese or other ethnicity.

The place of birth of residents was 94.2% United Kingdom, 0.9% Republic of Ireland, 0.5% Germany, 0.8% other Western Europe countries, 0.7% Africa, 0.6% Eastern Europe, 0.5% Far East, 0.5% South Asia, 0.5% Middle East, 0.4% North America and 0.3% Oceania.

Religion was recorded as 71.6% Christian, 17.1% no religion, 0.7% Muslim, 0.3% Buddhist, 0.3% Jewish, 0.2% Hindu, 0.1% Sikh; 0.3% had an alternative religion and 9.8% did not state their religion.

For every 100 females, there were 92 males. The age distribution was 6% aged 0–4 years, 16% aged 5–15 years, 5% aged 16–19 years, 31% aged 20–44 years, 23% aged 45–64 years and 19% aged 65 years and over.

11% of Margate residents had some kind of higher or professional qualification, compared to the national average of 20%.

== Economy ==
At the 2001 UK census, the economic activity of residents aged 16–74 was 33.8% in full-time employment, 11.8% in part-time employment, 8.0% self-employed, 5.5% unemployed, 2.2% students with jobs, 3.9% students without jobs, 15.5% retired, 8.3% looking after home or family, 7.9% permanently sick or disabled and 3.6% economically inactive for other reasons. The rate of unemployment in the town was considerably higher than the national rate of 3.4%.

The industry of employment of residents was 17% retail, 16% health & social work, 13% manufacturing, 9% construction, 8% real estate, 8% education, 7% transport & communications, 5% public administration, 6% hotels & restaurants, 2% finance, 1% agriculture and 6% other community, social or personal services. Compared to national figures, the town had a relatively high number of workers in the construction, hotels & restaurants and health & social care industries and a relatively low number in real estate and finance.

== Transport ==
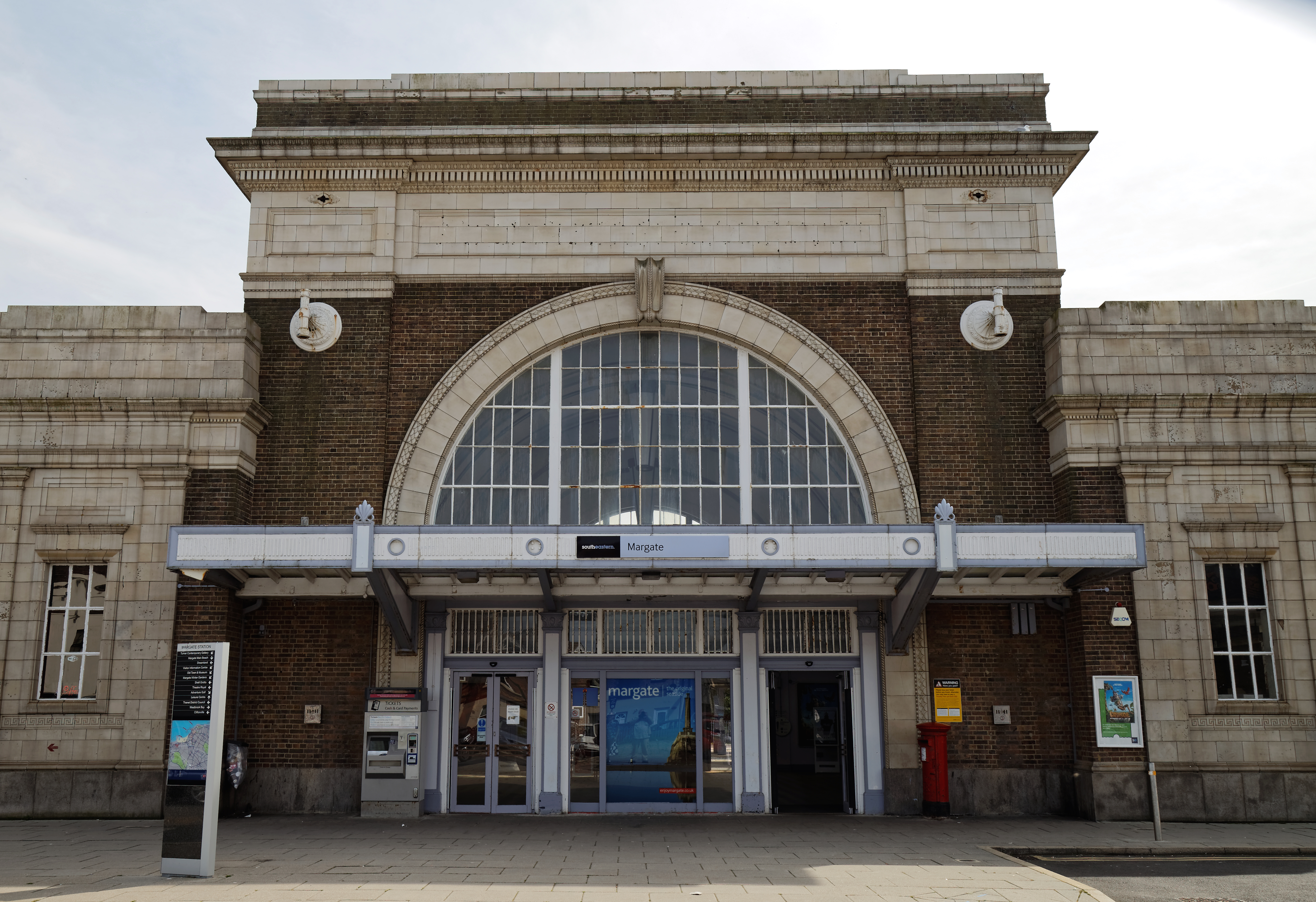
Margate railway station, which was constructed in 1926 to designs by Edwin Maxwell Fry

Margate railway station is sited 73 miles 69 chains (118.9 km) down the line from London Victoria. Trains from the station generally run to Victoria, via Chatham, and to London St Pancras, via Ramsgate, Canterbury West and Ashford International on the High Speed 1 line. Peak hour trains run to St Pancras, via Chatham and Gravesend, and to London Cannon Street. The station, and all trains that serve it, are operated by Southeastern.

Most bus services in Margate are operated by Stagecoach South East; with routes linking the town with Canterbury, Herne Bay and Ramsgate and many more. Frequent Loop buses, ensure that travel around the isle is easy. These services leave every 5–7 minutes (day times) from Cecil Square, in both directions; towards Cliftonville and towards Westwood Cross.

A National Express route, which operates between London Victoria and Ramsgate, calls at Margate seafront, Northdown Park and Cliftonville.

== Tourism ==
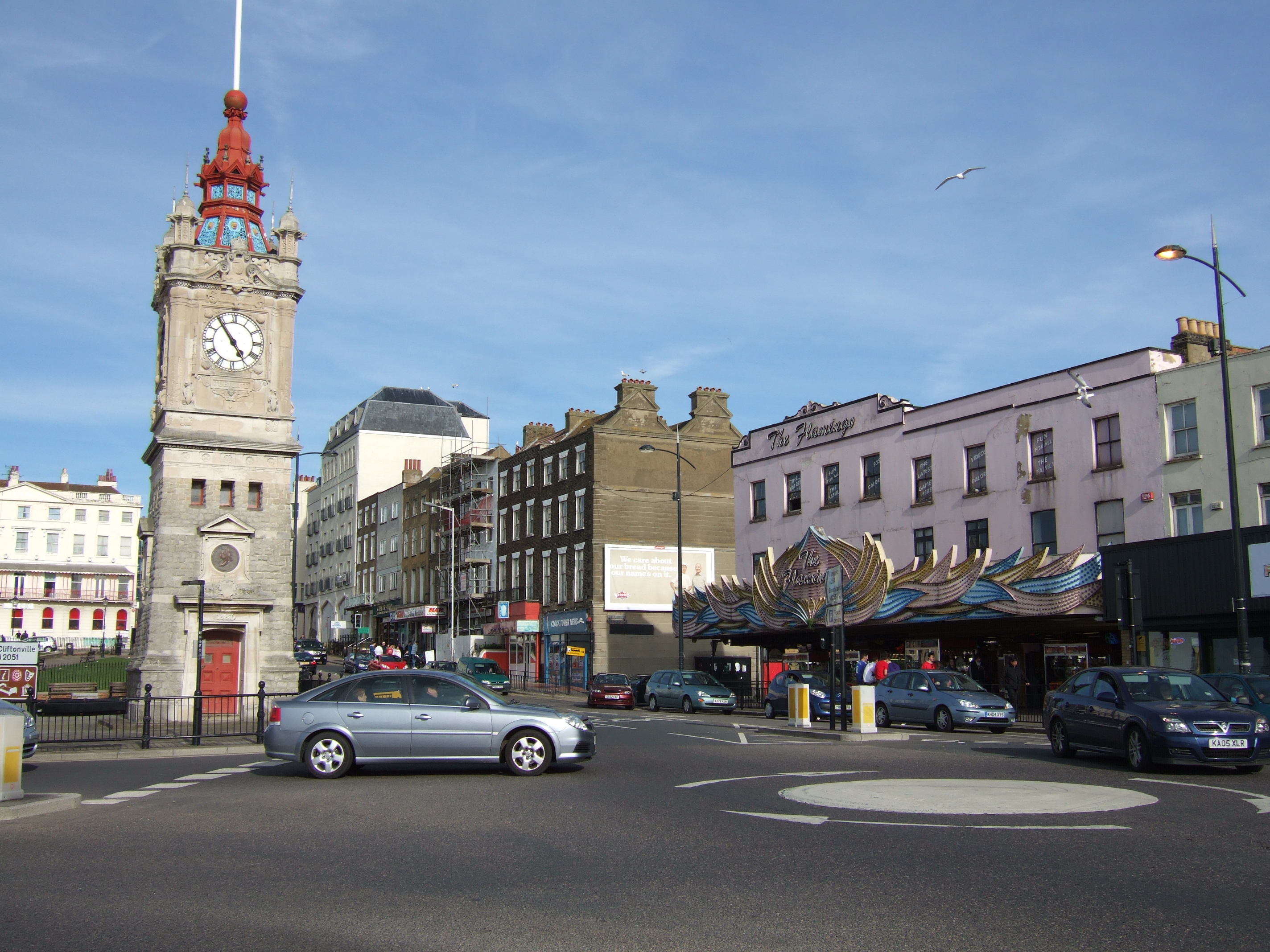
Margate Clock Tower and buildings on the sea front

Entrance to Dreamland

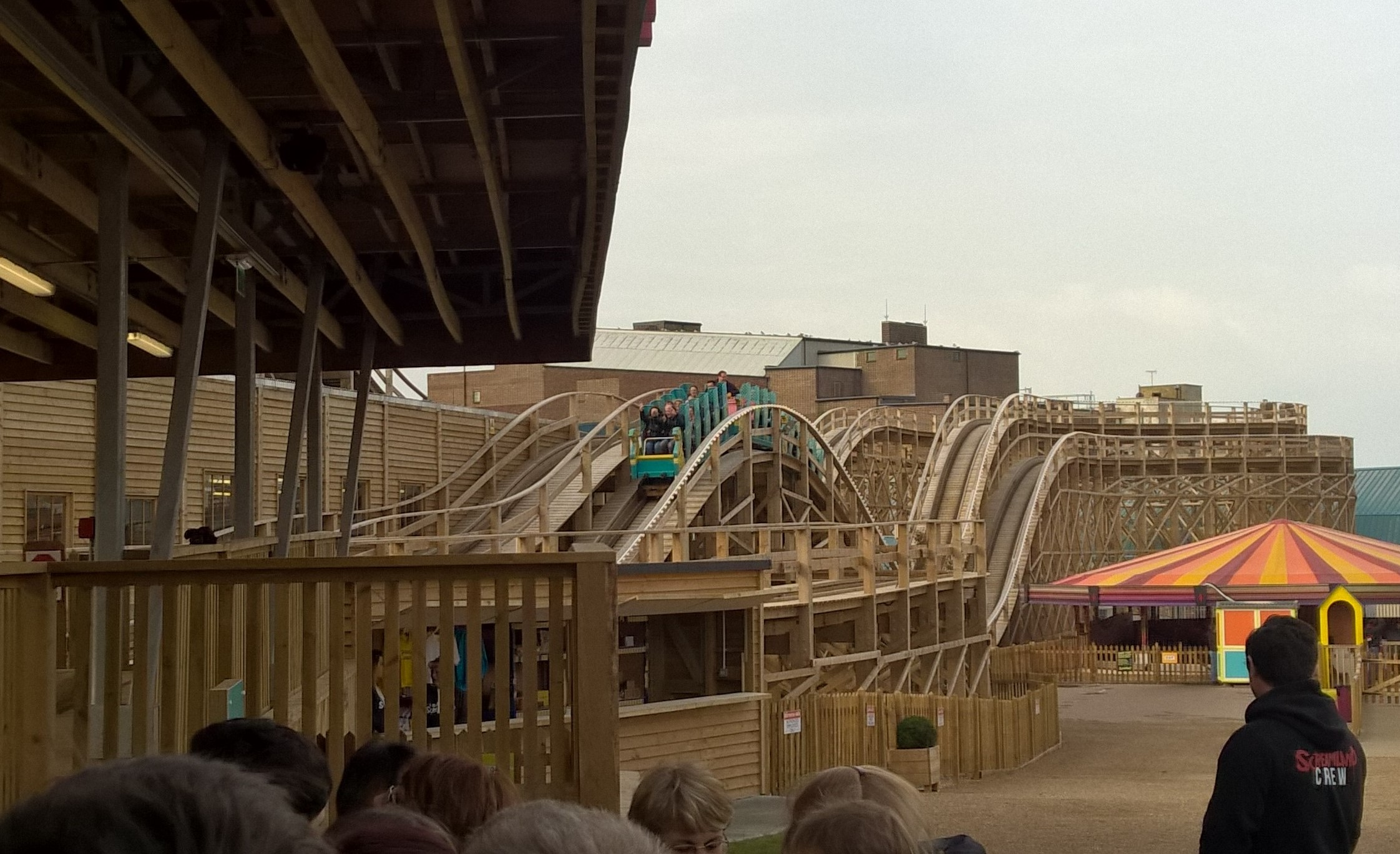
The Scenic Railway roller coaster at Dreamland

For at least 250 years, Margate has been a leading seaside resort in the UK, drawing Londoners to its beaches, Margate Sands. The bathing machines in use at Margate were described in 1805 as:

four-wheeled carriages, covered with canvas, and having at one end of them an umbrella of the same materials which is let down to the surface of the water, so that the bather descending from the machine by a few steps is concealed from the public view, whereby the most refined female is enabled to enjoy the advantages of the sea with the strictest delicacy.

The Dreamland Amusement Park is situated in the centre of Margate, operating since 1920, it was closed in 2006, and reopened in 2015 following a lengthy campaign by the "Save Dreamland Campaign" group. Its Scenic Railway roller coaster is the second oldest of its type in the world, and is now Grade II* listed. It is one of only two early-20th century scenic railways still remaining in the UK; the only other surviving UK scenic railway is in Great Yarmouth and was built in 1932. The Margate roller coaster is an ACE Coaster Classic. On 27 January 2026, Dreamland announced the permanent closure of the Scenic Railway. The ride had been closed since August 2024 following a derailing incident.

Cliftonville, next to Margate, had a classic British Arnold Palmer seaside mini golf course. It closed and was illegally converted to a skate park, which was later shut down by the council amid safety concerns.

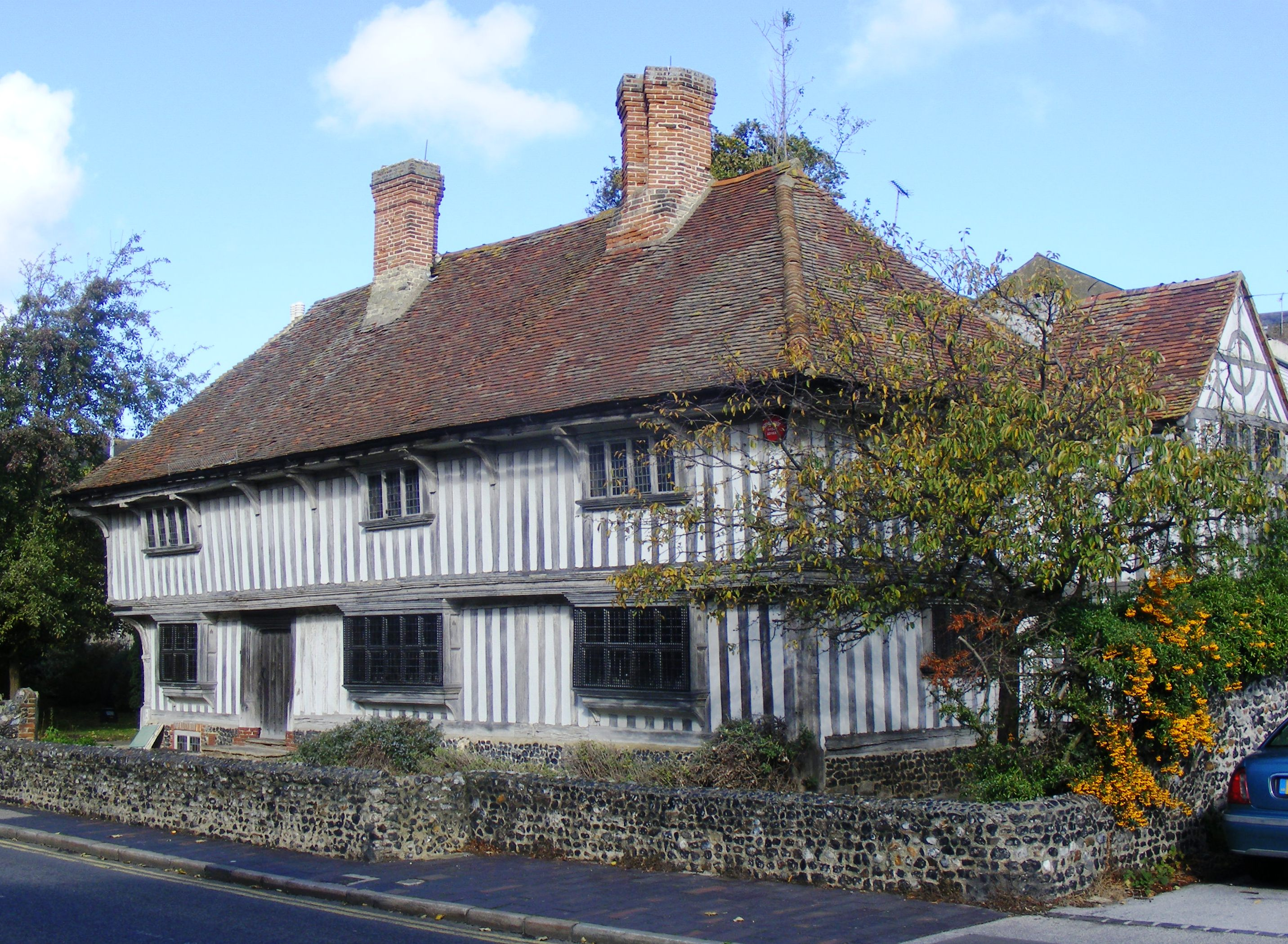
Tudor House

There are two notable theatres, the Theatre Royal in Addington Street – the second oldest theatre in the country – and The Tom Thumb Theatre, the second smallest in the country, in addition to the Winter Gardens. The Theatre Royal was built in 1787, burned down in 1829 and was remodelled in 1879 giving Margate more national publicity. The exterior is largely from the 19th century. At this current time, both Theatre Royal and Winter Gardens are closed. Theatre Royal closed on 28 April 2022, with the Winter Gardens following suit on 14 August 2022.

An annual jazz festival takes place on a weekend in June.

In September, an annual car show commences known as "Oh So Retro" featuring classic and retro vehicles, trade stalls and family-friendly entertainment.

Margate Museum in Market Place explores the town's seaside heritage in a range of exhibits and displays, and is currently closed awaiting refurbishment.

First discovered in 1798, the Margate Caves (also known as the Vortigern Caves) are situated at the bottom of Northdown Road. They reopened in 2019.

The Shell Grotto, which has walls and roof covered in elaborate decorations of over four million shells covering 2,000 square feet (200 m^{2}) in complex patterns, was rediscovered in 1835, but is of unknown age and origin. It has been designated as a Grade I listed building.

The Walpole Bay Tidal Pool is a Grade II listed tidal sea bathing pool built in 1937. The pool covers over four acres and its dimensions are 450 ft long, 300 ft wide at the seaward end and 550 ft long at the landward end. The water in the pool is refreshed by the incoming tide twice a day and fresh water springs rise from the beach within the walls.

== Regeneration ==
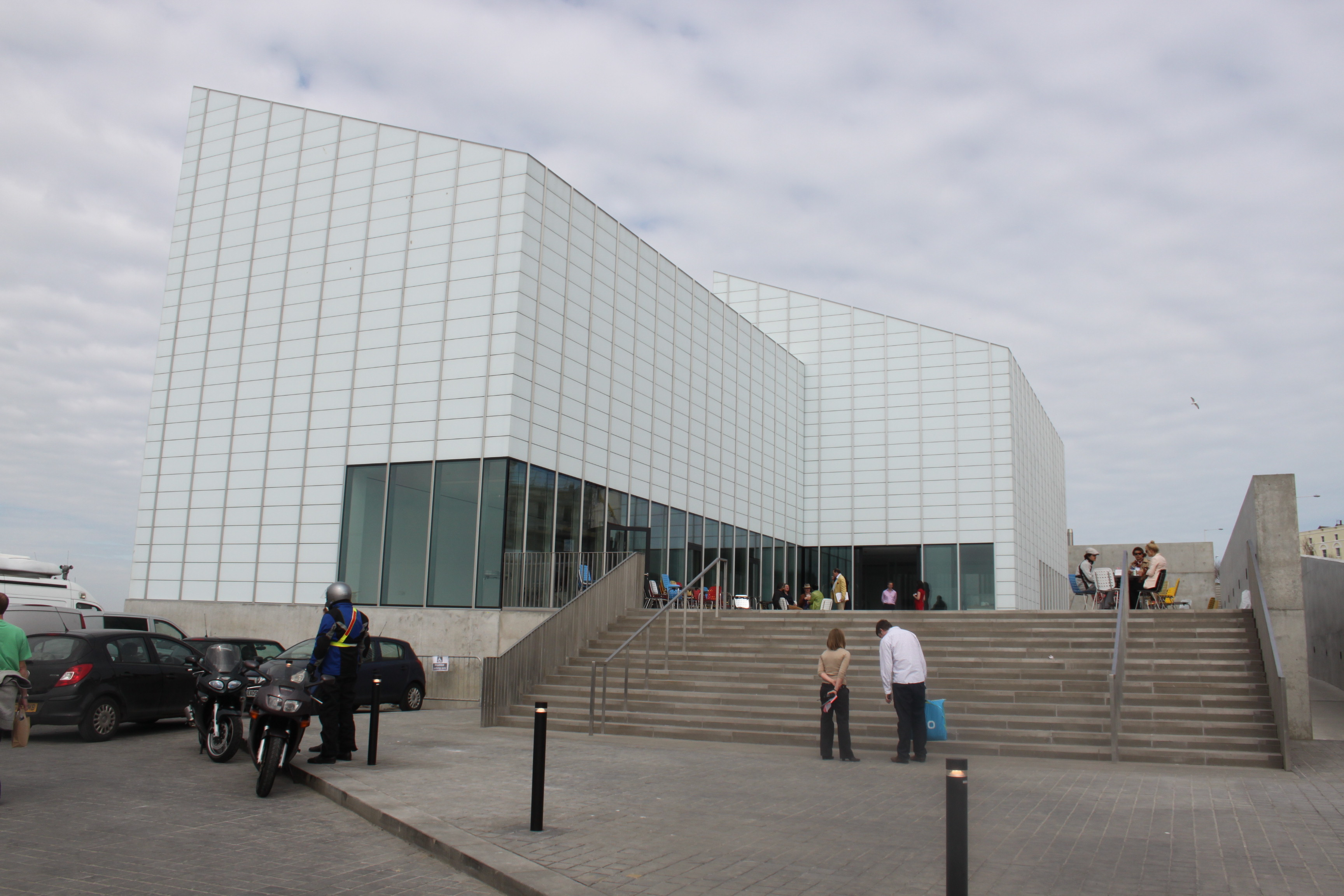
The Turner Contemporary art gallery opened in April 2011

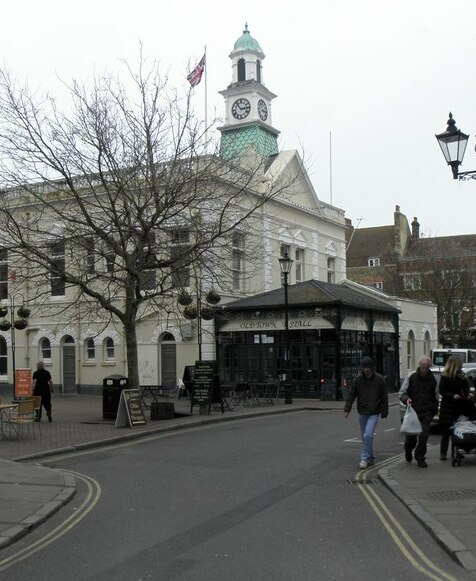
Margate Town Hall, completed in 1898

The former chairman of the Margate Civic Society, John Crofts, had a plan to develop a centre that would explore and show the link that the painter J. M. W. Turner shared with Margate. Turner described the Thanet skies as the "loveliest in all Europe." In 1994 Crofts became increasingly determined to create such a gallery and in 1998 the Leader of Kent County Council met a number of people from the art world to discuss the idea. They hoped that the centre would regenerate the once-thriving town of Margate and offer an alternative to Margate's traditional tourist trade. In the late 1990s, the County Council offered to fund the building of the Turner Gallery. Additional funding was contributed by the Arts Council England and South East England Development Agency. In 2001 the Turner Contemporary was officially established. The view from the gallery is similar to that seen by Turner from his lodging house.

To reduce the cost, Thanet District Council chose a new site inland from the harbour wall. The scheme was supported by the artist Tracey Emin, who was brought up in Margate. The building itself was designed by David Chipperfield Architects after the abandonment of the design by Snøhetta + Spence architects. Building work started in 2008 but the project's initiator, John Crofts, died in 2009. The Turner Contemporary Gallery officially opened on 16 April 2011.

Across the road from the gallery in Margate Old Town there is a community of independent shops. Accessed from the seafront via Market Street, Duke Street and King Street this area is clustered around the old Margate Town Hall in the centre of the Market Place. There is also a small museum in the town hall complex which provides information about the history of Margate. In 2012 Margate was chosen as one of the towns to benefit from the Portas Pilot Scheme aimed at regenerating some of Britain's high streets.

New businesses started flocking to Margate in the late 2010s. "There's been a whole bunch of businesses opening up ... Cliffs ... which is a sort of multipurpose space. Coffee, food, yoga, a record store. It does everything," Dom Bridges of skincare brand Haeckels, told New Statesman in 2017, adding that many were cropping up in Cliftonville, where locals wouldn't buy.

== Historic sites ==
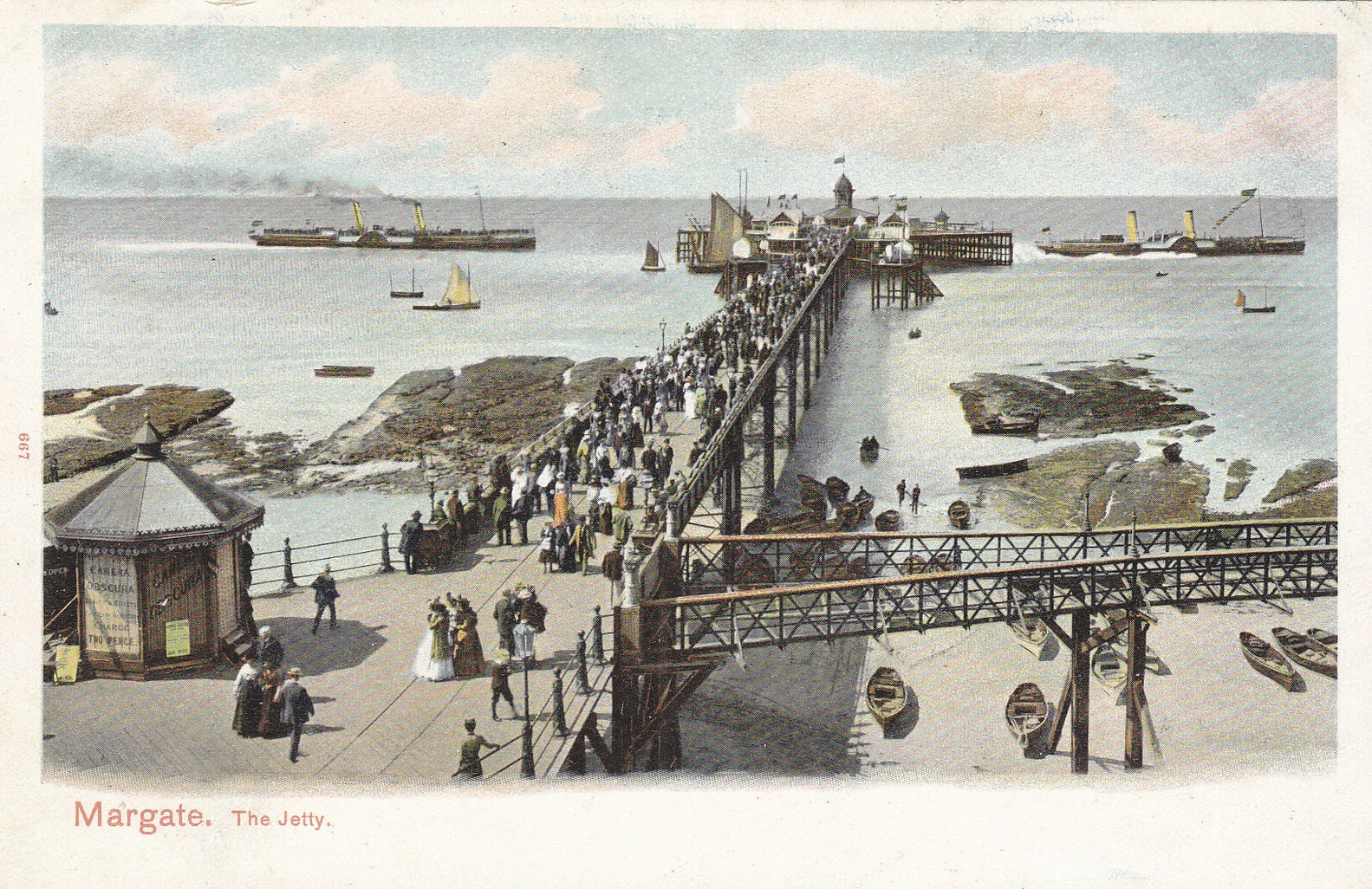
The Jetty, c. 1905

There is a 16th-century, two-storey timber-framed Tudor house built on a flint plinth in King Street.

Margate's Jubilee Clock Tower was built to commemorate Queen Victoria's Golden Jubilee in 1887, although not completed until 1889. It had a Time Ball mechanism, mounted on a mast atop the tower, which was raised a few minutes before 1 pm each day and dropped at precisely 1 pm, thereby allowing residents, visitors and ships to know the exact time. This was, of course, in the days before wireless transmission of time signals. The tower was Grade II listed in 1973. The Time Ball fell out of use many years ago, but following a suggestion by Arnold Schwartzman OBE RDI, a former Margate resident, Margate Civic Society raised funds to have the time ball repaired and brought back into use. This was successful, and a civic ceremony celebrated the restoration on 24 May 2014, Queen Victoria's birthday and the 125th anniversary of the Clock Tower's official opening. This was short lived though and unfortunately, the time ball stopped working again with the pole it is affixed to having been left unrepaired. More recently it has been left leaning at a very precarious 75-degree angle.

Draper's Mill is a smock mill built in 1845 by John Holman. It was working by wind until 1916 and by engine until the late 1930s. It was saved from demolition and is now restored and open to the public.

== In popular culture ==
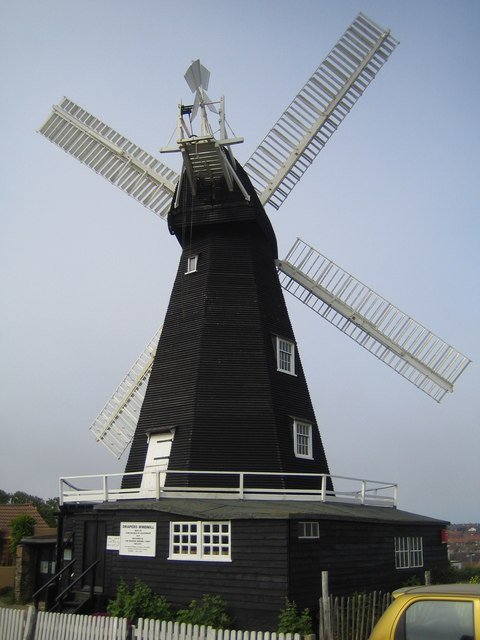
Draper's Mill

=== Literature ===
Margate features at the start and as a recurrent theme in Margate writer Iain Aitch's travelogue, A Fete Worse Than Death. The author was born in the town.

T. S. Eliot, who in 1921 recuperated after a mental breakdown in the town of Cliftonville, commented in his poem The Waste Land Part III - The Fire Sermon:

On Margate sands.
I can connect
Nothing with nothing.

Margate features as a destination in Graham Swift's novel Last Orders and its film adaptation. The character Jack Dodds had asked to have his remains scattered at Margate, and the book tells the tale of the drive to Margate and the memories evoked on the way.

The Victorian author William Thackeray used out-of-season Margate as the setting for his early unfinished novel A Shabby Genteel Story.

Margate features in the 2021 novel Dreamland by Rosa Rankin-Gee. The novel is set a little in the future from the present day in "the once refined but now rundown seaside town of Margate."

=== Music ===
"Margate" is the title of a UK single released by Chas & Dave in 1982.

"Margate Fhtagn" is a song by UK steampunk band the Men That Will Not Be Blamed for Nothing. The story related in the song combines the Victorian tradition of the seaside holiday with the works of H. P. Lovecraft, specifically the Cthulhu Mythos, to tell the tale of a Victorian family going on a seaside holiday to Margate, which gets interrupted by Cthulhu rising from the sea.

"Die Muschel von Margate" ("Seashells from Margate") is a song written by Kurt Weill and Felix Gasbarra from 1928. It featured in Konjunktur ("Oil Boom"), a play by Leo Lania in which three oil companies fight over the rights to oil production in a primitive Balkan country, and in the process exploit the people and destroy the environment.

It is thought that Ralph Vaughan Williams wrote The Lark Ascending whilst walking along the cliffs in Margate.

A photochrom print of Margate Harbour was used by the Icelandic-American band Low Roar as an album cover for ross., the band's fourth album released in 2019.

The song "High Rise" on Hawkwind's 1979 album PXR5 is reported to be inspired by Arlington House, Margate, where lyricist Robert Calvert grew up.

The Libertines recorded their 2024 album All Quiet on the Eastern Esplanade in The Albion Rooms in Cliftonville, the hotel, bar and recording studio that the band owns. The title of the album is a reference to the Eastern Esplanade in Cliftonville where The Albion Rooms are situated.

=== Film and television ===
In 1971, the BBC TV series Softly, Softly: Task Force episode "Sunday, Sweet Sunday", written by Alan Plater, was filmed in Margate. The episode has many shots of the town and seafront, including Dreamland.

The BBC documentary series Man Alive featured Margate in a 1974 special.

A 1989 episode of Only Fools & Horses, "The Jolly Boys' Outing", was set primarily in Margate, featuring Margate railway station and Dreamland.

On 30 September 2006 Antony Gormley's Waste Man was burned to the ground in front of an audience of thousands. The resulting ﬁlm, Exodus, a modern retelling of the biblical story by Penny Woolcock, was broadcast on Channel 4 in 2007 before being produced as a DVD.

The 2012 BBC television drama series True Love was set and filmed in Margate. The show had its first public screening at the Turner Contemporary.

The 2014 ITV sitcom Edge of Heaven was set at a 1980s-themed bed and breakfast on the Margate seaside.

Also in 2014, J. M. W. Turner's long-term relationship with Mrs. Sophia Booth of Margate was featured in the film Mr. Turner.

In series 4 of the British television crime drama Peaky Blinders (2017), the character Alfie Solomons (played by Tom Hardy) chooses to reside at Margate, where he's shot on the beach by Tommy Shelby.

In 2021, The Walpole Bay Hotel & Museum is featured in episode 3 of the ITV comedy drama The Larkins.

In 2022, Margate was featured as a location in the BBC Drama series Killing Eve. The seafront, and Dreamland also serve as filming locations for the film Empire of Light which was filmed in 2022, and the video for "A new bohemia" by the Pet Shop Boys.

In 2023, Margate was the set for hit series 'Dreamland' starring Lilly Allen.

=== In art ===
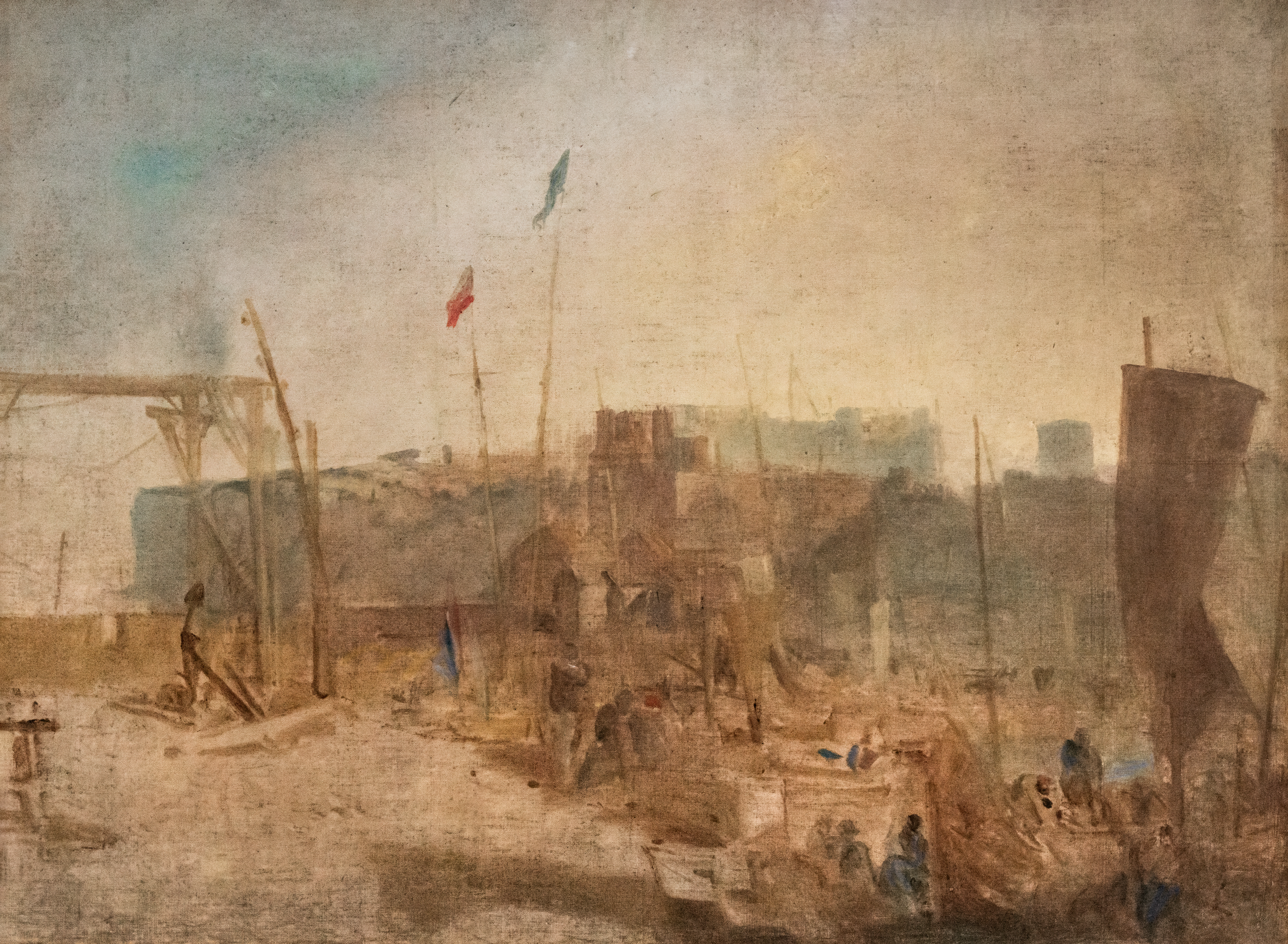
Margate - c.1806-7 William Turner - Tate Britain

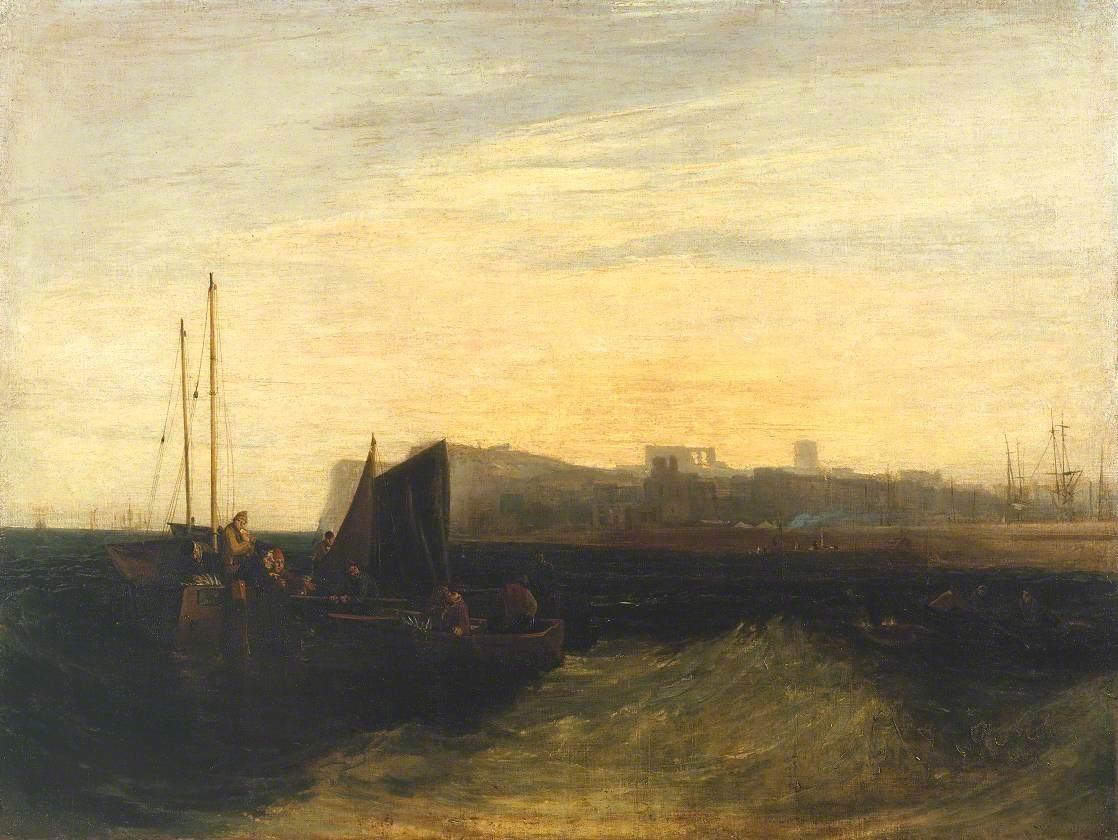
Margate - 1808 William Turner - Petworth House

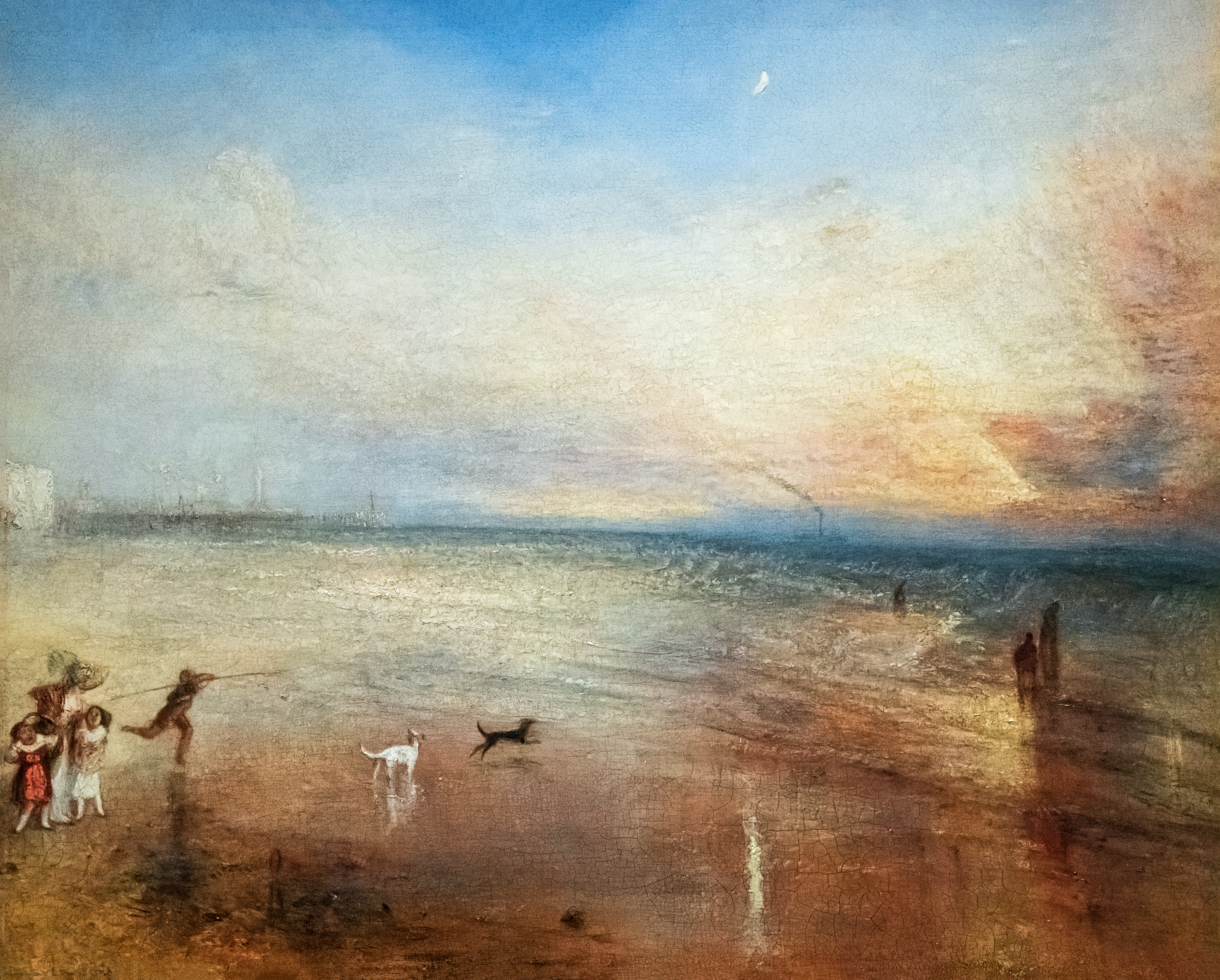
The New Moon - William Turner - Tate Britain

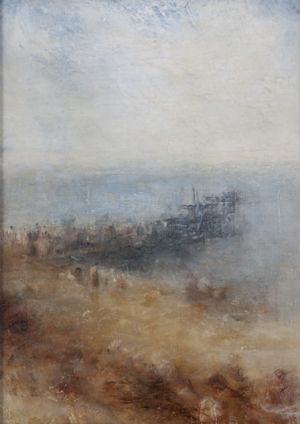
Margate Jetty - William Turner

=== People From Margate ===
- W. J. Brown, Trade Unionist
- Tracey Emin, Artist
- Florence Ada Kendrick, Artist
- Ollie Robinson, Current England Test Cricketer
- Jordan Cox, Current England Test Cricketer

== Sport ==
Margate F.C. play at Hartsdown Park. The club has played in the National League and the National League South but, as of 2021, they are currently playing in the Isthmian League.

Malle Beach Race is an organised motorcycle racing on the beach festival. In recent years, a popular beach race has been held at Barmouth, Wales; however, this event differs as it is run along the lines of a motocross event on a shorter motocross-style circuit.

Beach Cross Racing takes place twice a year, usually in March and October, and is known as Margate Beach Cross. The event, which is organised by QRAUK in conjunction with Island Events and Thanet District Council, has proven to be popular with not only British riders but with a huge number of riders from the Continent. The event has both quads and solos racing around a specially prepared course on Margate's main sands and it attracts many thousands of visitors.

== Local media ==
Margate had two paid-for newspapers, the Isle of Thanet Gazette and Thanet Times (which ceased publication in 2012), which are owned by Northcliffe Media. Free newspapers for the town include online-only Isle of Thanet News; the Thanet Extra, part of the KM Group; and yourthanet, part of KOS Media.

Local radio stations are KMFM Thanet, owned by the KM Group, community radio station Academy FM (Thanet); and the county-wide stations Heart South, Gold and BBC Radio Kent. Thanet Community Radio also offers an online community podcasting service for Ramsgate, Broadstairs, Margate and the wider areas of Thanet.

Local news and television programmes are provided by BBC South East and ITV Meridian. Television signals are received from the Dover TV transmitter and the local relay transmitter.

== Freedom of the Town ==
The following people have received the Freedom of the Town of Margate.

- Winston Churchill: 1957
- Tracey Emin: 16 August 2022
- Arnold Schwartzman: 29 September 2023

== Namesakes ==
Margate's name was given in 1908 to Margate, South Africa. to Margate City, New Jersey, previously called South Atlantic City.
