= Cliftonville (ward) =

Former electoral ward in Thanet, Kent, England

- Former electoral ward for the Thanet District Council
- Cliftonville ward boundaries from 1979 to 2003
- District: Thanet
- County: Kent
- Electorate: 6,375 (1999)
- Major settlements: Cliftonville

Former electoral ward
- Created: 1974
- Abolished: 2003
- Councillors: 3
- Replaced by: Cliftonville East and Cliftonville West

Cliftonville was an electoral ward in Thanet District, United Kingdom, from 1974 to 2003. It was first used for the 1973 election and last used for the 1999 election. The ward returned three councillors to the Thanet District Council. It was replaced by the Cliftonville East and Cliftonville West wards.

== Thanet council elections from 1973 to 1979 ==
The ward was named No. 4 (Margate: Cliftonville) for elections between 1973 and 1979.

=== 1973 election ===
1973 Thanet District Council election: Cliftonville
Party	Candidate	Votes	%	±%
Conservative	H. Anish	1,669	77.4	
Conservative	J. Jones	1,518	70.8	
Conservative	S. Knight	1,503	70.1	
Labour	J. Finegold	484	22.6	
Labour	J. Rowland	481	22.4	
Labour	E. Kearney	467	21.8	
Majority				
Turnout		1,429	28.2	5,074

=== 1976 election ===
1976 Thanet District Council election: Cliftonville
Party	Candidate	Votes	%	±%
Conservative	H. Anish	1,563	53.3	
Conservative	D. Dolding	1,337	45.6%	
Conservative	J. Jones	1,273	43.4	
Ratepayers	P. Mendham	1,097	37.4	
Ratepayers	H. Grove	1,063	36.3	
Ratepayers	J. Vaughan	1,010	34.5	
Labour	M. Harvey	313	10.7%	
Majority				
Turnout		2,930	50.8	5,768

== Thanet council elections from 1979 to 2003 ==
There was a revision of ward boundaries in Thanet in 1979. The ward was named Cliftonville for elections between 1979 and 2003.

=== 1979 election ===
1979 Thanet District Council election: Cliftonville
Party	Candidate	Votes	%	±%
Conservative	H. Anish	2,297		
Conservative	D. Dolding	1,877		
Conservative	J. Jones	1,851		
Independent	H. St John	819		
Independent	J. Cammack	772		
Independent	S. Papa-Adams	727		
Labour	J. Nicholson	591		
Majority				
Turnout		3,707	73.2	5,063

=== 1983 election ===
1983 Thanet District Council election: Cliftonville
Party	Candidate	Votes	%	±%
Conservative	F. Cheshire	1,110		
Independent	J. Tappenden	1,056		
Conservative	G. Selmers	1,034		
Conservative	J. Jones	987		
Independent	K. Jones	906		
Independent	A. Cella	854		
Labour	S. Rowland	329		
Labour	M. Green	316		
Liberal	B. Chance	190		
Liberal	D. Brown	189		
Liberal	J. Stocken	185		
Majority				
Turnout		2,495	46.2	5,395

=== 1987 election ===
1987 Thanet District Council election: Cliftonville
Party	Candidate	Votes	%	±%
Conservative	Frederick Brench	997		
Independent	Colin Cuthbert	983		
Conservative	Rozanne Duncan	942		
Liberal	Anthony Regan	762		
Liberal	John Sparkes	480		
Independent	John Rootes	466		
Liberal	Diane Brown	460		
Independent	William Hysted	360		
Labour	Sandra Baker	299		
Labour	Julian Ravenscroft	254		
Majority				
Turnout		3,041	42.2	7,039

=== 1991 election ===
1991 Thanet District Council election: Cliftonville
Party	Candidate	Votes	%	±%
Conservative	Henry Callaghan	1,337		
Conservative	Ronald Garretty	1,295		
Conservative	Rozanne Duncan	1,281		
Independent	Maurice Ezekiel	858		
Labour	Kathleen Coe	639		
Labour	Ruth Ford	585		
Majority				
Turnout		2,458	40.0	6,145

=== 1995 election ===
1995 Thanet District Council election: Cliftonville
Party	Candidate	Votes	%	±%
Labour	Kathleen Coe	1,036	38.8	
Labour	P. Cambridge	1,034	38.8	
Conservative	I. Gregory	998	37.4	
Conservative	Ronald Garretty	973	36.5	
Labour	T. Ali	966	36.2	
Conservative	Maurice Ezekiel	959	35.9	
Independent	J Hone	524	19.6	
Independent	Henry Callaghan	491	18.4	
Independent	A. Waddilove	445	16.7	
Majority				
Turnout		2,668	41.2	6,475

=== 1999 election ===
1999 Thanet District Council election: Cliftonville
Party	Candidate	Votes	%	±%
Conservative	Sandy Ezekiel	1,223		
Conservative	Anthony Waddilove	1,142		
Conservative	Brian Sullivan	1,138		
Labour	Neville Hampton	797		
Labour	Paul Cooke	784		
Labour	Beryl Stapley	747		
Majority				
Turnout		2,071	32.5	6,375
