= Margate Marine & Pier =

Margate Marine & Pier was a ward of Margate Municipal District, Kent, England, prior to 1973. It had been a vacation resort since the late 19th century. When the Municipal District was included in the Thanet Borough in 1974, Marine & Pier ward elected 2 councillors to the new Borough at the elections of 1973 and 1976.

1973 Election

Margate Marine & Pier ward
Party	Candidate	Votes	%	±%
Conservative	C Hoser	892	62.4%	
Conservative	D Masters	861	60.3%	
Conservative	M Rowland	817	57.2%	
Labour	Mrs M Sankey	537	37.8%	
Labour	Mrs S Rowland	528	36.9%	
Labour	M Finegold	480	33.6%	
Majority		355,324,280		
Turnout		2,144	56.3%	3,810

1976 Election

Margate Marine & Pier ward
Party	Candidate	Votes	%	±%
Conservative	C Hoser	863	43.2%	
Conservative	D Masters	816	40.8%	
Conservative	M Rowland	773	38.7%	
Independent	P Mortlock (Ratepayers)	552	27.6%	
Independent	D Greig (Ratepayers)	539	27.0%	
Labour	C Harvey	487	24.9%	
Independent	Mrs B Leadbeater (Ratepayers)	471	23.6%	
Majority		311,264,221		
Turnout		1,998	51.0%	3,917

The election of 1979 was fought on revised boundaries and Margate Marine & Pier ward had been split between Marine and Pier wards, each electing one councillors.
