= HMS Icarus =

Four ships of the British Royal Navy have been named HMS Icarus, after the Icarus of Greek mythology.

- HMS Icarus (1814), an 18-gun brig-sloop launched in 1814, on coast guard duty in 1839, and sold 1861.
- HMS Icarus (1858), a screw sloop in service from 1858 to 1875.
- HMS Icarus (1885), a Mariner-class composite screw sloop in service from 1885 to 1904.
- HMS Icarus (D03), an I-class destroyer laid down by John Brown and Company, Limited, at Clydebank in Scotland on 9 March 1936, launched on 26 November 1936.
