= Outline of obstetrics =

Medical specialty concerning pregnancy and childbirth

The following outline is provided as an overview of and topical guide to obstetrics:

Obstetrics – medical specialty dealing with the care of all women's reproductive tracts and their children during pregnancy (prenatal period), childbirth and the postnatal period.

== What is obstetrics? ==
Obstetrics can be described as all of the following:

- Medicine – medicine is the science and art of healing. It encompasses a variety of health care practices evolved to maintain and restore health by the prevention and treatment of illness in human beings.
  - Medical specialty – branch of medical science. After completing medical school, physicians or surgeons usually further their medical education in a specific specialty of medicine by completing a multiple year residency to become a medical specialist.
- Academic discipline – In addition to being a medical specialty, obstetrics is the study of the reproductive process within the female body, including fertilization, pregnancy and childbirth.

== History of obstetrics ==
- Childbirth and obstetrics in antiquity

== Medical history ==
- Gravidity and parity

== Pregnancy and childbirth ==
- Pregnancy
- Childbirth

=== Family planning ===
- Family planning
  - Birth control
    - Contraception
  - Pre-conception counseling

=== Female reproductive anatomy ===
- Amniotic fluid
- Amniotic sac
  - Amnion
- Cervix
- Endometrium
- Fallopian tube
- Ovaries
- Pelvis
  - Pelvic bone width
- Placenta
- Uterus – Also called a womb.
- Vagina

=== Conception ===
- Human fertilization
  - Assisted reproductive technology
    - Artificial insemination
    - Fertility medication
    - In vitro fertilisation
  - Fertility awareness
  - Unintended pregnancy

=== Testing ===
- Pregnancy test
- 3D ultrasound
- Home testing
- Obstetric ultrasonography
- Prenatal testing

=== Prenatal stage ===
==== Prenatal development ====
- Prenatal development
  - Fundal height
  - Gestational age
  - Human embryogenesis
  - Maternal physiological changes

==== Prenatal care ====
- Prenatal care – regular medical and nursing care recommended for women during pregnancy. Also known as antenatal care.
  - Prenatal nutrition
    - Maternal nutrition
    - Nutrition and pregnancy
  - Concomitant conditions
    - Diabetes mellitus and pregnancy
    - Systemic lupus erythematosus and pregnancy

==== Prenatal monitoring ====
- Amniocentesis
- Chorionic villus sampling
- Cardiotocography
- Nonstress test

=== Childbirth ===
- Childbirth

==== Preparation for childbirth ====
- Adaptation to extrauterine life
- Bradley method of natural childbirth
- Hypnobirthing
- Lamaze technique
- Nesting instinct

==== Roles during childbirth ====
- Doula
- Midwife
- Mother – a woman who has raised a child, given birth to a child, and/or supplied the ovum that united with a sperm which grew into a child. During childbirth, she is the patient.
- Perinatal nursing
- Men's role in childbirth
- Obstetrician

==== Delivery ====
- Pelvimetry
  - Bishop score
  - Cervical dilation
  - Cervical effacement
  - Position
- Home birth
  - Multiple birth
  - Natural childbirth
  - Unassisted childbirth
  - Water birth
- Aspects and conditions
  - Bloody show
  - Childbirth positions
  - Contraction
  - Presentation
    - Breech birth
    - Cephalic presentation
    - Shoulder presentation
    - Rupture of membranes

=== Postpartum issues ===
- Postpartum
  - Child care
    - Breastfeeding
  - Congenital disorders
  - Sex after pregnancy

== Complications of pregnancy and childbirth ==
- Complications of pregnancy ( list)
  - abortion
  - abruption
  - breech birth
  - cephalo-pelvic disproportion
  - caesarean section, cesarean section, C-section
  - dermatoses of pregnancy specific skin conditions during pregnancy
  - diabetes
  - eclampsia
  - ectopic pregnancy
  - epilepsy and pregnancy
  - gestational diabetes
  - Group B Streptococcus infection
  - HELLP syndrome
  - hypertension
  - hysterectomy
  - Intrauterine Growth Restriction (IUGR)
  - macrosomia (big baby)
  - malpractice
  - miscarriage or stillbirth
  - obstetric fistula
  - obstetric hemorrhage
  - Pelvic girdle pain
  - placenta praevia
  - pre-eclampsia
  - premature birth, preterm labor or prematurity
  - small for gestational age (SGA)
  - uterine rupture
  - uterine incarceration

== Obstetrics organizations ==
- American Association of Gynecologic Laparoscopists
- American Congress of Obstetricians and Gynecologists
- British Pregnancy Advisory Service
- British Society of Urogynaecologists
- European Society of Gynaecological Oncology
- FOGSI
- Gynecologic Oncology Group
- Ipas (organization)
- Society of Obstetricians and Gynaecologists of Pakistan
- Society of Obstetricians and Gynaecologists of Canada
- World Endometriosis Research Foundation

== Obstetrics publications ==
- Acta Obstetricia et Gynecologica Scandinavica
- African Journal of Reproductive Health
- American Journal of Obstetrics and Gynecology
- Climacteric (journal)
- The European Journal of Contraception & Reproductive Health Care
- Gynecological Endocrinology
- Human Fertility (Cambridge)
- Human Reproduction (journal)
- Hypertension in Pregnancy
- International Journal of Fertility
- Journal of Human Reproductive Sciences
- Journal of Maternal-Fetal and Neonatal Medicine
- Journal of Obstetrics and Gynaecology
- Journal of Psychosomatic Obstetrics & Gynecology
- Menopause (journal)
- Obstetrics & Gynecology (journal)
- Placenta (journal)
- Reproduction (journal)
- Reproductive Sciences
- Systems Biology in Reproductive Medicine
- Women & Health

== Persons influential in obstetrics ==
- Edward Kowalski

== See also ==
- Gynecology
- embryo
- embryology
- gestation
- hormone
- identical twin
- In Vitro Fertilization (IVF)
- labor, labour - see childbirth
- lactation
- live birth
- menstrual cycle
- natural childbirth
- navel
- ovum or egg
- oxytocin or pitocin
- pediatrics
- sterilization
- twin
- umbilical cord
- umbilicus - see navel
