= Flora Hommel =

American childbirth educator (1928–2015)

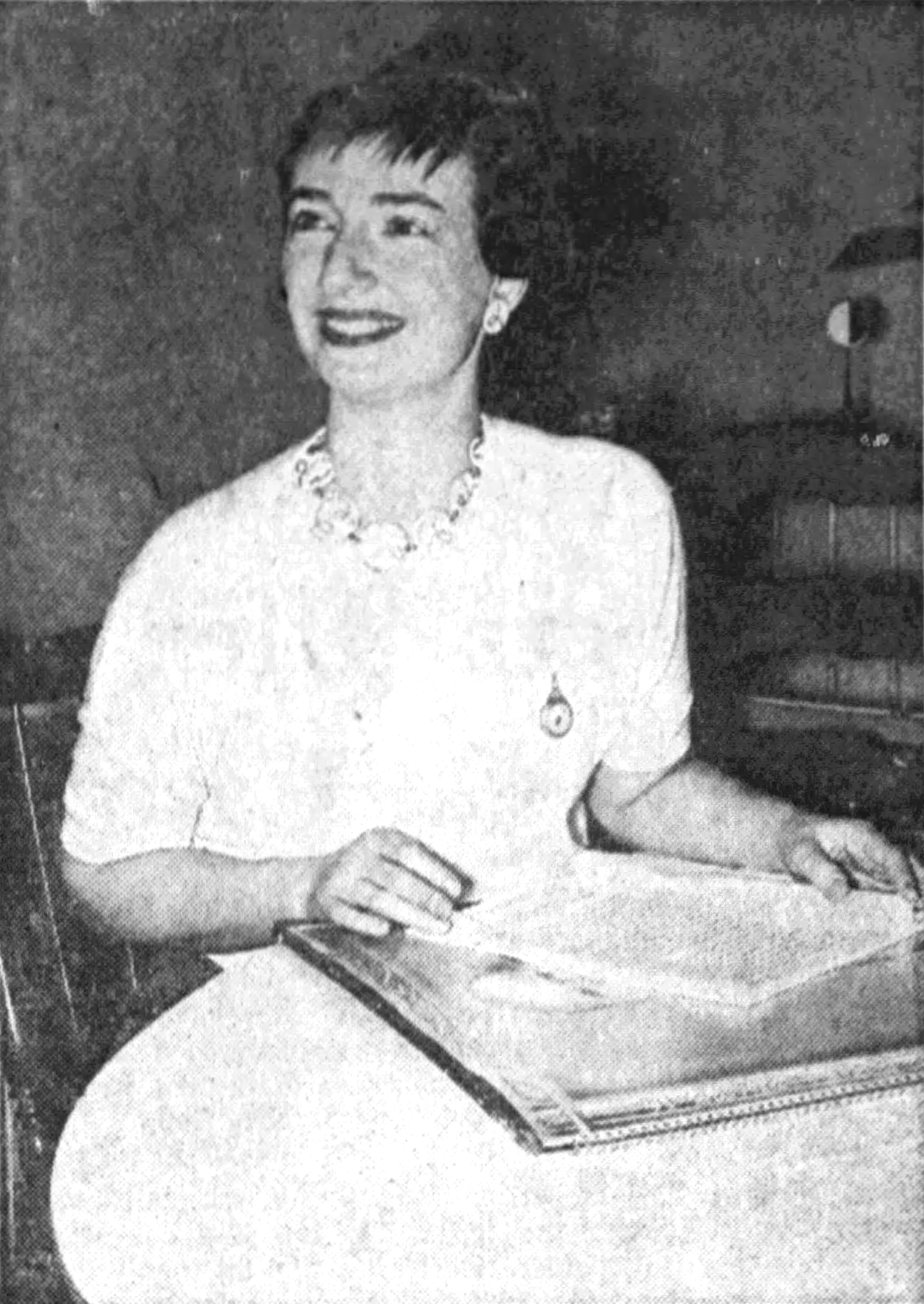
- Hommel in 1969
- Born: Flora Nadine Suhd; 1928; Detroit, Michigan, US
- Died: May 15, 2015 (aged 86–87); Detroit, Michigan, US
- Education: Wayne State University (BS)
- Occupations: Childbirth educator, nurse
- Known for: Founder of Childbirth Without Pain Education Association

Flora Hommel (1928 – May 15, 2015) was an American childbirth educator and nurse who founded the Childbirth Without Pain Education Association to promote the Lamaze technique for child delivery. She was inducted into the Michigan Women's Hall of Fame in 1994.

== Life and work ==
Flora Nadine Suhd was born in 1928 in Detroit, Michigan. She met Bernard Hommel at age 15 and married at age 18, after his return from World War II. After becoming pregnant with her first child, she was fearful of painful labor, and was provided a book on natural childbirth authored by Grantly Dick-Read, and experienced an "easy" delivery based on the techniques in the book.

Living in Paris at the time, she studied under Dr. Fernand Lamaze, assisting him with multiple deliveries in 1951. She also trained as a monitrice under Dr. Lamaze. She returned to Detroit in 1953, aiming to educate American women on the benefits of using the Lamaze technique for child delivery. She enrolled at Wayne State University and graduated with a Bachelor of Science in nursing in 1958.

After graduating with her nurses degree, Hommel began teaching the Lamaze method out of her home. In 1960, Hommel founded the Childbirth Without Pain Association. In 1964, this organization became the nonprofit Childbirth Without Pain Education Association. Hommel served on the national board of the International Childbirth Education Association from 1964 through 1968 in recognition of her "outstanding contributions" in the field of obstetrics. She was also an honorary life member of the American Society for Psychoprophylaxis in Obstetrics. From 1973 to 1990, Hommel served on the Detroit Health Commission. She was also a national board member for the Gray Panthers.

Hommel campaigned for improvements to social security and advocated for a single-payer healthcare system. By 1989, Hommel had taught Lamaze to over 17,000 couples, and coached over 1,000 women through their deliveries. In 1994, Hommel was inducted into the Michigan Women's Hall of Fame for her lifelong commitment to "giving women a greater say in their childbirth experience". Hommel died on May 15, 2015, of complications from Alzheimer's disease in Detroit.
