= Elisabeth Bing =

20th and 21st-century American physical therapist

- Born: Elisabeth Dorothea Koenigsberger; 8 July 1914; Berlin, Germany
- Died: 15 May 2015 (aged 100); New York City, United States
- Other names: Elisabeth Koenigsberger
- Occupation: Physical therapist
- Known for: Proponent of natural childbirth
- Notable work: 1940s–2000s
- Spouse: Fred Max Bing (m. 1951) (widowed)
- Children: 1 (son, Peter)

Elisabeth Dorothea Bing (née Koenigsberger; 8 July 1914 – 15 May 2015) was a German physical therapist, co-founder of Lamaze International, and proponent of natural childbirth. She trained as a physical therapist in England after fleeing Nazi Germany due to her Jewish ancestry. Her hospital work there made her interested in natural childbirth, and she taught it to parents in the United States after she moved there in 1949. To promote natural childbirth methods, she co-founded the American Society for Psychoprophylaxis in Obstetrics (now Lamaze International), made several TV appearances and radio broadcasts, and wrote several books on the subject. She became known as the "mother" of the Lamaze method in the United States.

== Early life ==
Elisabeth Dorothea Koenigsberger was born on 8 July 1914, in Gruenau, a suburb of Berlin. Hers was a home birth as she was delivered before the doctor could arrive.

Her family were of Jewish descent, but converted to Protestantism years before her birth, and, on sensing danger with the rise of Nazi Germany, they decided to leave the country. Elisabeth left Germany for England in September 1933. She was the first of the family to leave.

== Career ==
In England, Bing trained as a physical therapist. At first she took a job as a student nurse, as physical therapy training was cheaper after one year of student nursing, and it was difficult to get money abroad from Germany at that time. However, she was forced to quit halfway through after falling ill and having to have surgery. After she moved to London, her family managed to get enough money to her to pay for her training. She trained for three years and became a member of the Chartered Society of Physical Therapy.

Her interest in obstetrics began after working with new mothers in hospital. At the time, standard childbirth procedures involved giving mothers large amounts of medication, and keeping them in hospital for ten days after they gave birth. Bing's job was to give physical therapy to these postpartum mothers. After talking about her experiences at the hospital with one of her part-time private patients, she learned of Grantly Dick-Read's book Natural Childbirth. She was unable to meet Read or other like-minded individuals because of the outbreak of World War II, so she taught herself as much as she could about obstetrics.

In 1949, Bing moved to Jacksonville, Illinois, in the United States, at the invitation of her sister. It was here that she first got the chance to teach natural childbirth methods, after being invited by an obstetrician she met at a house party. She coached all of the obstetrician's patients in natural childbirth, learning while she taught. After a year of this, she decided to go back to England. However, as she passed through New York, she met her husband, Fred Max Bing, and decided to remain there. They married in 1951.

Bing continued to teach natural childbirth methods in New York, and in 1951 she was invited by Dr. Alan Guttmacher to teach at Mount Sinai Hospital, which had just opened its first maternity ward. It was here that she heard about the psychoprophylactic method of childbirth developed by Dr. Fernand Lamaze. Lamaze's method incorporated breathing techniques as well as the natural childbirth techniques developed by Read. Mount Sinai Hospital could not afford to send Bing to France to learn the method from Lamaze, but she met Marjorie Karmel, who had published the book Thank You, Dr. Lamaze, in 1959. Karmel had learned the method directly from Lamaze in Paris, and she in turn taught it to Bing. In 1960, the two went on to found the American Society for Psychoprophylaxis in Obstetrics, now known as Lamaze International.

Bing was an advocate for the importance of mothers making informed childbirth decisions. As well as educating parents about childbirth, she worked with obstetricians to introduce them to natural childbirth methods. She also wrote articles; appeared on television and radio shows, including shows hosted by Barbara Walters and Phil Donahue; and wrote several books, including Six Practical Lessons for an Easier Childbirth. She became known as the "mother" of Lamaze among the American public.

Bing is featured in the 1975 documentary Giving Birth: Four Portraits.

Bing died at the age of 100 in her New York apartment in May 2015. She was survived by her son, Peter, a professor of Greek (Hellenistic poetry).
