= Men's role in childbirth =

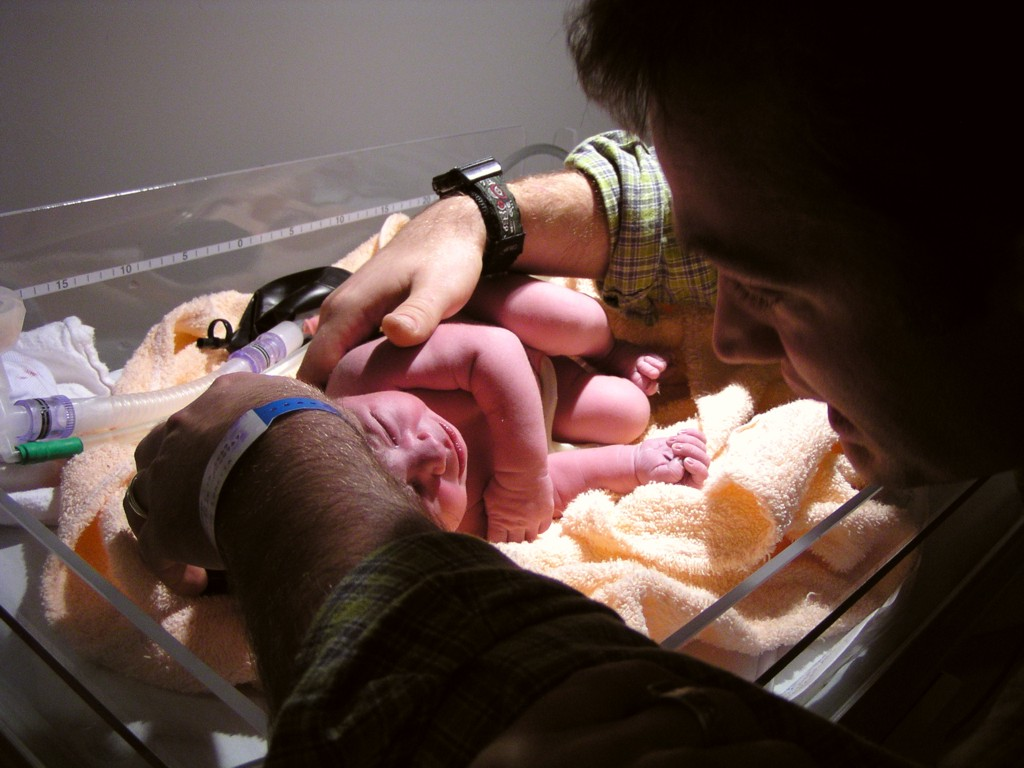
Some fathers fully participate in the birth of their children

The role of men in childbirth in the Western world has become more participatory than it was in the past. More Western women want their male partners to give active assistance during pregnancy and childbirth.

== History ==
=== United States ===
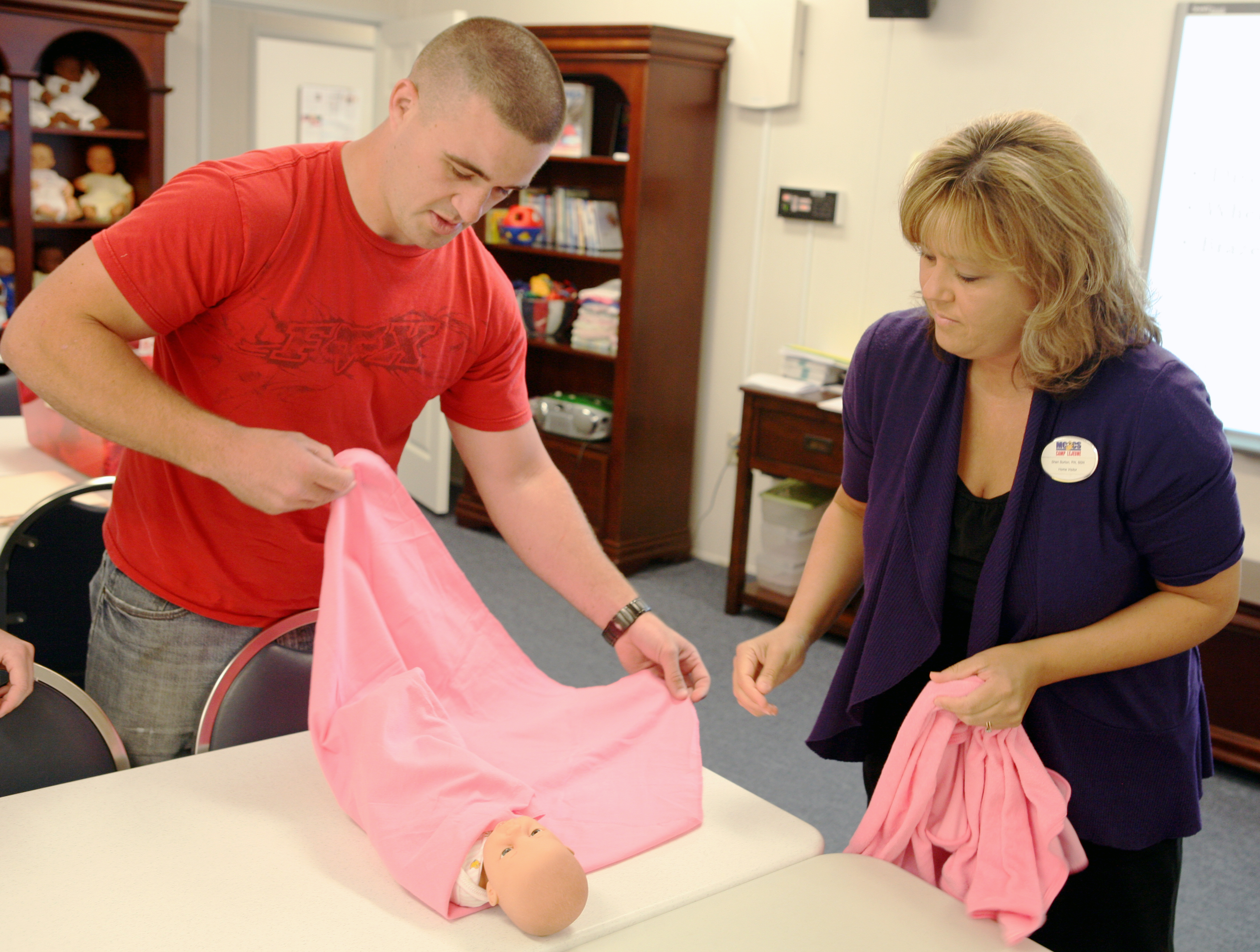
Father learns how to care for "practice baby"

Until the concluding decades of the 19th century, an experienced nurse midwife, who was considered to be knowledgeable about the birth process, typically helped to deliver a woman's baby. Birth typically took place in the home, and it was considered to be an event for females. It was a time for female friends and relatives to come into the home and care for the mother, her household, provide reassurance, and offer guidance. Birth was not considered to be a private event, but more of a social one, that also could create a strong bond among the participants and supporting attendees.

Physicians there warned that it was dangerous not to receive modern medical attention while delivering children. They also stated one in every thirty women was expected to die because of a lack of medical attention. Due to these warnings, many women favored going into labor with a physician as opposed to a midwife. Physicians typically prohibited friends and relatives from participating or observing. The birth process may have been regarded as private or even embarrassing to the patient or the doctor and there were issues of preventing infection. Around 1910, some states began to outlaw the midwifery practice. Others enacted regulatory requirements which were difficult for many midwives to complete. Since the 1920s, physician assistance has been predominant during childbirth. However, since the 1960s midwifery has returned and grown in popularity and societal acceptance. Even during childbirth with a physician, it is now common for women to have their families, particularly their partners, in the delivery room with them.

To help their wives prepare for childbirth, many male partners participate in specialized childbirth classes, such as Lamaze or Bradley method of natural childbirth. Men may give active assistance during childbirth by simply being present during his wife's labor or by coaching during childbirth. Many women find their partners' presence in the delivery room to be comforting. If he is present the man may be able to assist in making decisions that may be required at various junctures in the childbirth process (for example, regarding the use of epidural, accelerating delivery, dealing with medical problems and other matters).

=== Australia ===
Until the early 1960s men were typically excluded from the labour room. However, during this decade there was an increasing pressure on hospitals to allow men into the labour room to provide support for their partners. It was only by the 1980s that it became common and expected that men would be present when their partners gave birth. The contemporary Australian experience is that men are expected to be present and support their partners.

== Factors affecting husband's aid during pregnancy and delivery ==
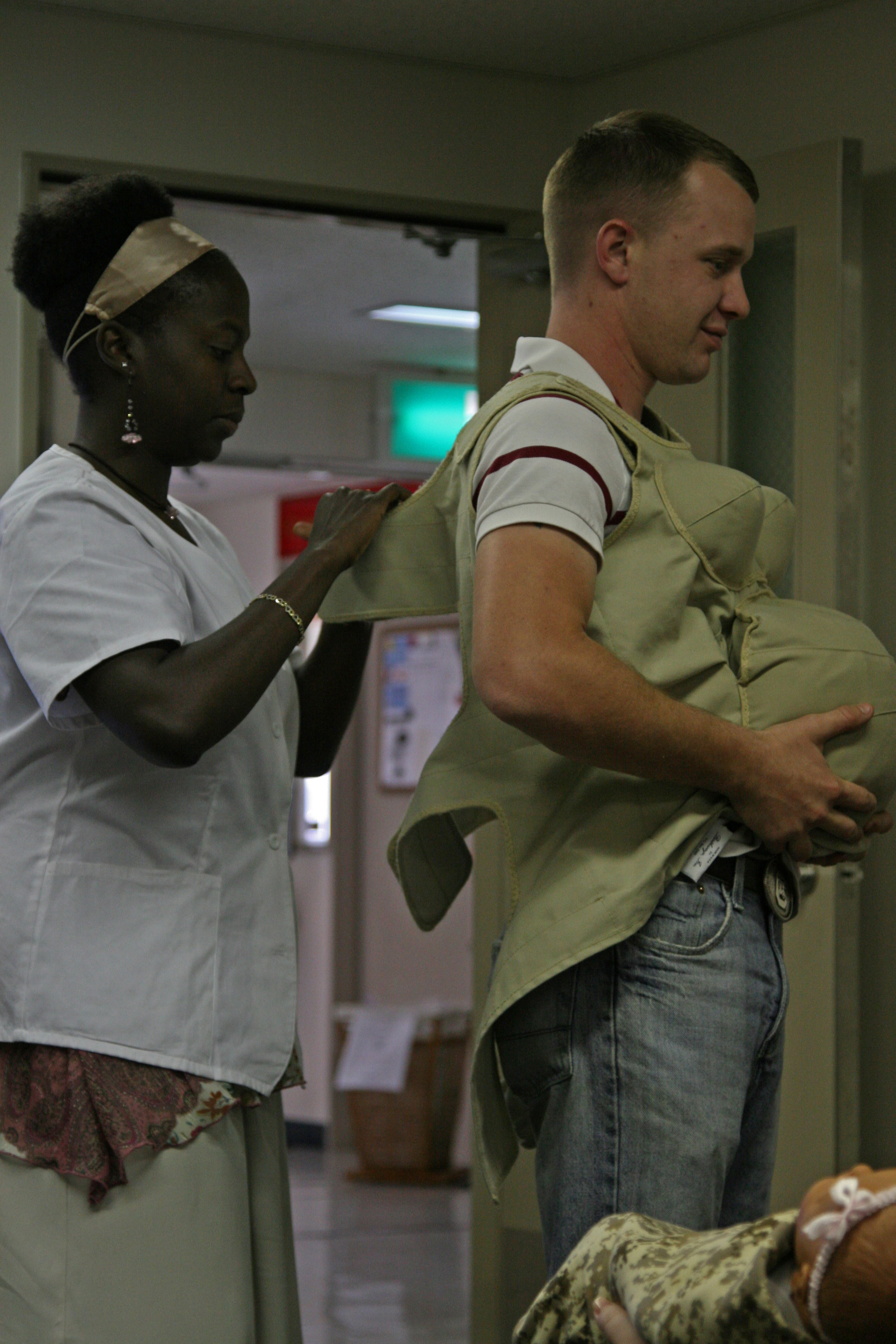
Military father in the "empathy belly" during a Baby Boot Camp workshop on the basics of newborn care.

Many women find it soothing to have someone assist them during their pregnancies, making it more common for a woman's male partner to support her both before and during childbirth. The type and quality of a relationship between a man and a woman is what determines how, and if, the man will be active during his partner's pregnancy.

=== Fear and anxiety ===
Some contend that when men are fearful or anxious regarding birth that they actually make the birth more difficult for their partner. Their fear may be transmitted to their partner and this increases her adrenaline levels leading to labor stalling. In some circumstances this may require the use of medications such as oxytocin to restart labor and thus can sometimes lead to a cascade of intervention that can result in a caesarean section.

== Examples of participation ==
Male musicians have played music during childbirth. Percussionist Mickey Hart recorded Music to Be Born By in advance of the birth, where he played the album. Paraguayan harp player Alfredo Rolando Ortiz played Paraguayan harp at the birth of his child.

== See also ==
- Couvade syndrome

== Bibliography ==
- Block, C.R.; A.G. Charles; S. Meyering; J.L. Norr; K.L. Norr (April 1981). "Husband Gatekeeping in Childbirth". Family Relations. 30 (2). National Council on Family Relations: 197–204. doi:10.2307/584131. JSTOR 584131.
- Corijn, Martine; J. Gierveld; A. Liefbroer (February 1996). "It Takes Two to Tango, Doesn't It? The Influence of Couple Characteristics on the Timing of the Birth of the First Child". Journal of Marriage and the Family. 58 (1). National Council on Family Relations: 117–126. doi:10.2307/353381. JSTOR 353381.
- Dye, Nancy Schrom (1980). "History of Childbirth in America". Signs: Journal of Women in Culture and Society. 6 (1): 97–108. doi:10.1086/493779. PMID 21213655. S2CID 144068193.
- Bradley, Robert A. (1996) Husband-Coached Childbirth (4th ed.). New York, NY: Bantam Books. ISBN 0-553-37556-3.
- Hathaway, Marjie; Hathaway, Jay; Bek, Susan Hathaway; Hathaway, James (2002) The Bradley Method Student Workbook. Sherman Oaks, CA: American Academy of Husband-Coached Childbirth. ISBN 0-931560-01-2.
