= Daucosma =

Scientific classification
- Kingdom: Plantae
- Clade: Tracheophytes
- Clade: Angiosperms
- Clade: Eudicots
- Clade: Asterids
- Order: Apiales
- Family: Apiaceae
- Subfamily: Apioideae
- Tribe: Oenantheae
- Genus: Daucosma; Engelm. & A.Gray

Genus of flowering plants

Daucosma is a genus of flowering plants belonging to the family Apiaceae.

Its native range is Texas.

Species:

- Daucosma laciniata Engelm. & A.Gray
