= Unassisted childbirth =

Intentionally giving birth without medical assistance

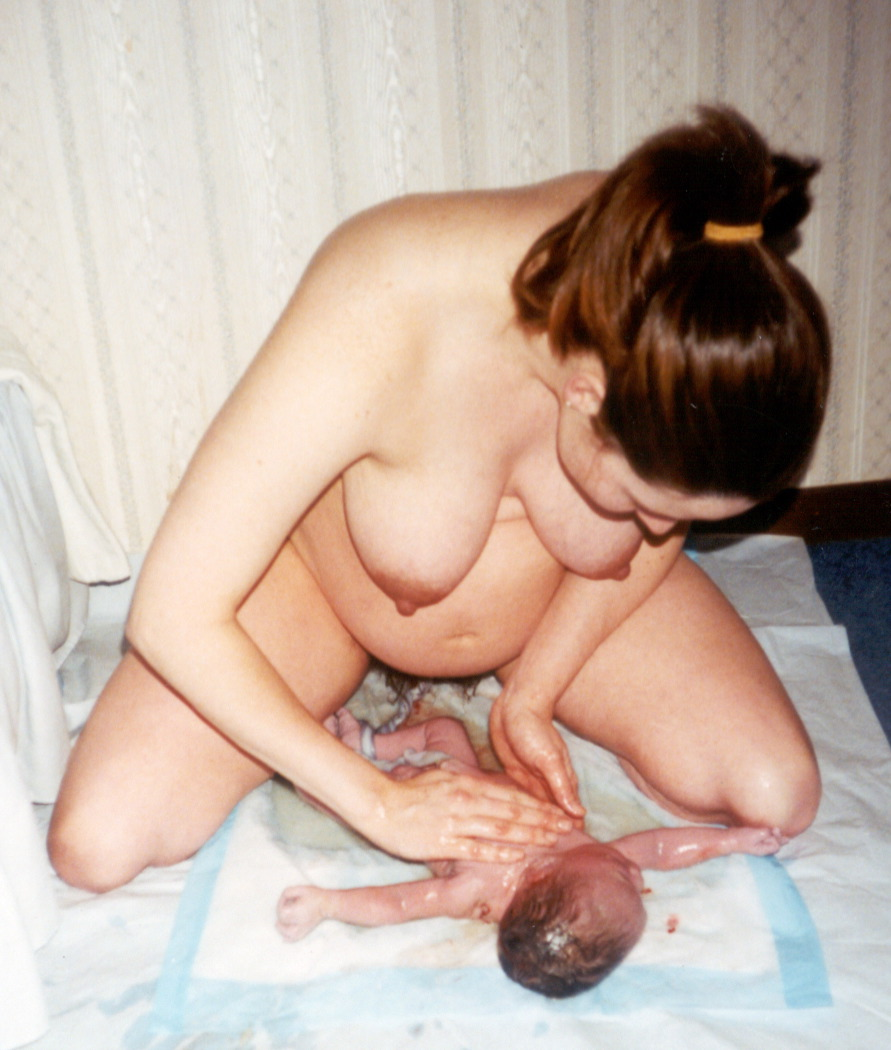
A woman delivers her child unassisted at home.

Unassisted childbirth (UC) refers to the process of intentionally giving birth without the assistance of a medical birth attendant. It may also be known as freebirth, DIY (do-it-yourself) birth, unhindered birth, and unassisted home birth. Unassisted childbirth is by definition a planned process, and is thus distinct from unassisted birth due to reasons of emergency, lack of access to a skilled birth attendant, or other. It is also different from homebirth, although most UCs also happen within the home.

Vital Statistics Canada defines an "unassisted/unattended" birth as one that takes place without a registered medical attendant, regardless of what other birth assistants may have been in attendance (doulas, non-medical or traditional birth attendants, etc.). Many "unassisted" births involve the attendance of a non-medical birth attendant, though the definition of unassisted birth sometimes means there is only family or peers in attendance and no professional support whatsoever. Approximately 0.25% of births in the United States are unassisted.

Unassisted childbirth comes with risks. Numerous national medical societies, as well as midwives' associations, have cautioned against unassisted childbirth. Twenty percent of all previously normal pregnancies turn into complications and high-risk situations during labor, which could necessitate assistance from trained medical professionals. OB-GYNs do not recommend home births, even when attended by a medical professional, if the mother has hypertension or when a breech birth is expected. A 2010 meta-analysis of existing research from Western countries concluded that "Less medical intervention during planned home birth is associated with a tripling of the neonatal mortality rate."

== Types ==
=== Unassisted with friends or family ===
While unassisted childbirth does not include the use of medical personnel or birth attendants in a professional capacity, the birthing woman may still wish to have other people present at the birth of her child. This might include her partner, close friends of the mother, the grandparents-to-be, or other family members. These people may take on various roles such as minding the other children in the family, preparing food, making sure the mother remains undisturbed by phone calls, etc.

=== Couple's birth ===
A woman giving birth and her partner may wish to be alone together for the birth of their child. Some couples who choose unassisted childbirth consider the birth to be a consummation or extension of their married life. In terms of wanting to have an ecstatic or orgasmic birth, a high degree of privacy is desired. Others may simply consider birth to be an intimate bonding time between the spouses and their newborn child.

=== Solo birth ===
Some women choose to give birth completely alone. They may retreat to a room alone at the time of the birth and then bring their partner in afterward; or they may remain entirely alone in their home or another location. Women who choose a solo unassisted birth may see birthing as an intensely private process, or may feel they have all the resources they need through their intuition.

=== Freebirth ===
Giving birth without any health care provider supervision. Sometimes used synonymously with "unassisted birth", and sometimes used to describe any birth without medically licensed professionals present, regardless of who else may or not be in attendance in a supportive role.

== Birth preparation and prenatal care ==
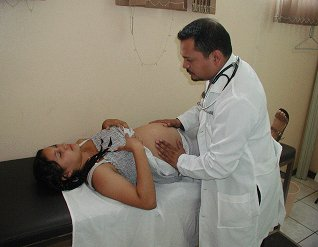
Doctor giving woman a prenatal exam

With respect to medical prenatal care, two broad categories are recognized by unassisted childbirth proponents:

=== Assisted ===
Many women who are planning an unassisted birth choose to have professional prenatal care as part of their birth preparation. This may include regular prenatal visits with a doctor or monitoring by a midwife. Seeking the assistance of a doctor or midwife may allow for discovering risk factors that might make an unassisted birth inadvisable, such as placenta praevia. Professional prenatal care may also help identify risk factors that could be managed so that the unassisted birth can continue as planned. Rather than keep to a traditional prenatal care schedule, some women may also selectively choose prenatal care.

=== Unassisted ===
Some women who choose UC also choose to have a medically unassisted pregnancy; i.e. they do not visit a doctor or other birth professional for prenatal care. There are potentially life-threatening consequences of having no medical follow-up in case there are complications.

== Prevalence ==
=== United States ===
The National Center for Health Statistics reports that of the 4.1 million babies born in the United States in 2004, more than 7,000 were born at home without a midwife or physician attending. It is unknown what portion of these births, roughly equivalent to a sixth of 1% of the nation's annual total, occurred by choice.

=== Australia ===
It is not currently known how many women in Australia give birth at home by choice without medical assistance. Home births in Australia represent 0.25 percent of all births, with the majority of these done with the assistance of a midwife.

== Motivations ==
A 2021 qualitative study conducted in Poland examined women’s pathways to freebirth using semi-structured interviews, with the goal of understanding why women were choosing to give birth completely unassisted. The authors note there was “great diversity of pathways to freebirth” seen from the participants. However, all participants reported negative prior experience with maternity care where the women had felt there was a mismatch between their needs and the care they received. Women were more likely to report traumatic experiences about hospital births than midwife-attended home births, but there were negative experiences reported with both. Two themes identified were “persistent and unnecessary use of medical technology” and “rudeness and lack of respect” from providers. All the women interviewed in this study believed that medical intervention had complicated their previous birth experience. Additionally, all interviewed described their freebirth as “positive and empowering” due to an increased feeling of autonomy and the participation of support people.

== Risks ==
In response to the recent growth in interest over unassisted childbirth, several national medical societies, including the Society of Obstetricians and Gynaecologists of Canada, the American College of Obstetricians and Gynecologists, and the Royal Australian and New Zealand College of Obstetricians and Gynaecologists, have issued strongly worded public statements warning against the practice. Professional midwives' associations, including the Royal College of Midwives and the American College of Nurse-Midwives also caution against UC.

Unassisted childbirth has been linked to substantially elevated rates of both maternal and neonatal mortality. One of the few, and perhaps the only, formal investigation of the mortality rates associated with the practice was conducted by the Indiana State Board of Health in 1984, among members of a religious community in Indiana. The investigation found a perinatal mortality rate 2.7 times higher, and a maternal mortality rate 97 times higher than the state average. In this community, pregnant women receive no prenatal medical care and deliver at home without medical assistance. This community avoids not only prenatal medical care but all medical care.

Unassisted childbirth comes with serious risks. If something goes wrong during labor, the mother and child might need assistance from trained medical staff. According to the president of the American College of Obstetricians and Gynecologists, Thomas Purdon, twenty percent of all previously normal pregnancies turn into complications and high-risk situations during the course of labor that could result in serious adverse outcome to mother and baby, including death.

OB-GYNs do not recommend home births, even when attended by a medical professional, if the mother has hypertension or when a breech birth is expected. A 2010 meta-analysis of existing research from Western countries concluded that "Less medical intervention during planned home birth is associated with a tripling of the neonatal mortality rate."

== Proponents ==
The UC movement grew out of, and is an extension of the natural childbirth movement, pioneers of which include Grantly Dick-Read, Robert A. Bradley, and Fernand Lamaze. Jeannine Parvati Baker, a yogini, writer, poet, herbalist, and "spiritual midwife", coined the term freebirth to describe UC.

The Free Birth Society (FBS) is one influential freebirth advocacy group; it sells online courses and private consultations as well as offering podcasts and social media content. The founders and instructors of FBS do not have medical training. Despite this, FBS content and instructors make medical claims and dispense health advice, minimizing the risks of serious complications and encouraging mothers to ignore dangerous signs.

At least 48 mothers and babies have died preventable deaths or become permanently disabled after the FBS discouraged them from seeking medical care. FBS-trained "birth attendants" claim not to advertise themselves as licensed midwives, but because they dispense advice around pregnancy and birth, some mothers assume they are medically trained and able to assist in emergencies.

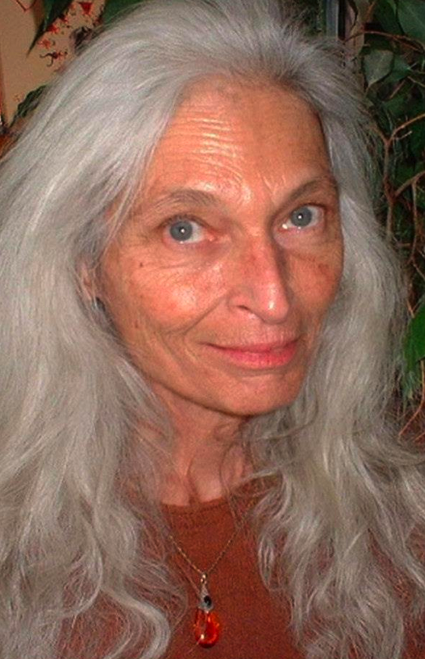
Jeannine Parvati-Baker, unassisted childbirth proponent

Laura Shanley, a writer, poet, and self-styled birth consultant, is the author of the book Unassisted Childbirth (1993), which helped popularize the practice. Inspired by the writings of Dick-Read, Shanley, who has no formal training in gynecology or obstetrics, gave birth to all five of her own children unassisted and with no prenatal care. Four of them survived; Shanley's fourth child, born four weeks premature in her bathroom, died a few hours later of a heart defect, pneumonia, and sepsis.

Reasons and motivations for choosing to give birth unassisted range greatly from mother to mother; those most frequently cited in unassisted childbirth literature and advocacy sites include the belief that birth is a normal function of the female body and therefore not a medical emergency.

== Controversy ==
Controversy over the practice of UC has largely centered over whether it is, as claimed by proponents, a safe method of childbirth. Critics of UC, such as the Society of Obstetricians and Gynaecologists of Canada (SOGC), claim that unassisted childbirth is quite unsafe, and that those who engage in it are "courting danger". A spokesperson for the American College of Obstetricians and Gynecologists issued a one-word assessment of freebirth: "dangerous". The SOGC notes that more than 500,000 women worldwide die annually from complications during childbirth, and that even in developed countries, in which expectant mothers generally receive complete prenatal care, as many as 15% of all births involve potentially fatal complications. In poor countries in which there are conditions of malnutrition and taboos surrounding childbirth or there is a lack of qualified birth attendants, rates of maternal and infant mortality and complications such as fistula are much higher, with disparities in death rates from childbirth between developed and developing countries approaching two orders of magnitude. Critics also point out the high rates of complication and death arising from childbirth that existed before the development of modern medicine: between 10 and 15 deaths per 1000 births.

UC proponents have responded to these criticisms by emphasizing that childbirth is not a disease, but rather a natural, physiological process requiring proper nutrition, hygiene, prenatal self-care, and psychological preparation. They claim that both throughout history and in the impoverished regions of today's world it has not been the lack of medical assistance, but rather conditions of poverty and nutritional ignorance which cause maternal mortality to be a major health issue. Rickets, for example, is prevalent in daughters of malnourished women, resulting in deformation of the pelvis and an increased chance of hemorrhage in scenarios of anemia. Proponents assert that the women who plan unassisted childbirth today (many of whom are giving birth to their second or third child, with a 'proven' pelvis), do so with a wealth of information and self-care, and are better prepared than most women who depend on care providers to deliver their child.

Some proponents have also claimed that modern maternal mortality rates in American hospitals are often obscured by being statistically tracked under 'anesthesiology'. However, evidence suggests that if this is in fact the case, the practice is unlikely to account for more than a small fraction of maternal deaths: one study of maternal mortality records lists the total share of maternal mortality deaths recorded as stemming from anesthesia-related complications as just 5.2%. A study of anesthesia-related maternal mortality in the United States between 1979 and 2002 found the share of maternal mortality deaths caused by anesthesia to be just 1.6%, and that the share had dropped 59% between the time periods examined.

Other aspects of this response have also been called into question by scientific research. First, an analysis of historical data from Europe and the United States concluded that in developed countries, the main determinant of maternal mortality before 1937, and its decline since the 1930s, was not levels of poverty and associated malnutrition, but rather the overall standard of maternal care provided by birth attendants.

Second, with respect to UC proponents' claim that unassisted childbirth is a natural process, researchers in the field of paleoanthropology have asserted that assisted childbirth is, in fact, a central evolutionary aspect of humanity, and may date back as far as five million years to when humanity's ancestors first began walking upright.

=== Joyous Birth incident ===
On 27 March 2009, Janet Fraser, a leading advocate of UC and national convener of the highly popular Joyous Birth website, lost her child during a birth assisted only by her partner and a female friend. In an interview five days earlier with The Sunday Age, Fraser, in the early stages of labor at the time, stated that she had at no point during her pregnancy consulted with a health professional, and that she intended to deliver the baby at her home without an attending midwife. The cause of death was reported to be cardiac arrest. A coronial inquest concluded in 2012 that Roisin Fraser's death was the result of a complication resulting from cord entanglement, was almost certainly preventable if the birth had proceeded in a maternity unit, and was probably preventable if the birth at home had been attended by a registered midwife. It also found that Fraser's claim of "birthrape" during her first birth followed a planned homebirth attended by a midwife, where Fraser herself requested transfer to a hospital for epidural anaesthesia, and then subsequently requested a caesarean birth without medical indications and against medical advice.

== See also ==
- Save Lily – Campaign to regain custody of removed child
