= Hans Kundrat =

Austrian pathologist

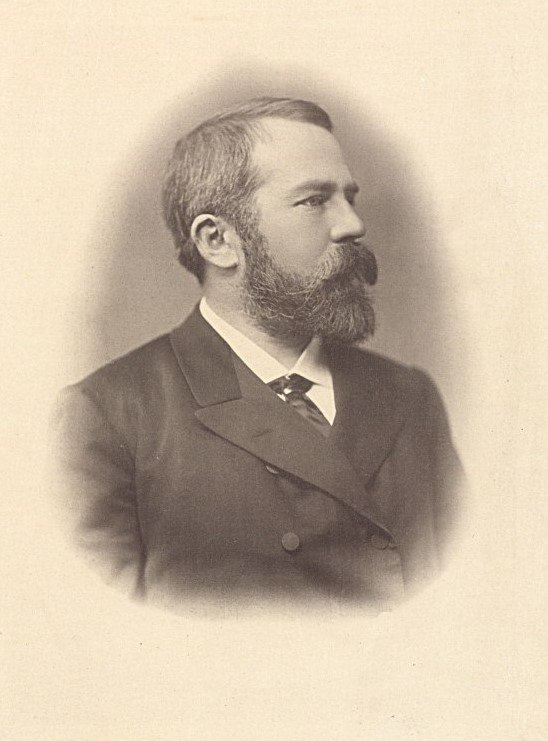
Hans Kundrat

Hans Kundrat (6 October 1845 – 25 April 1893) was a pathologist born in Vienna, Austrian Empire.

He studied medicine in Vienna, and as a student he was a demonstrator under Josef Hyrtl and Karl von Rokitansky. In 1868 he received his medical doctorate, and remained in Vienna as an assistant to Rokitansky. In 1873 he obtained his habilitation, and in 1877 attained the chair of pathology at the University of Graz. Five years later he returned to the University of Vienna as chair of pathology, a position he kept until his death. One of his better known students was Richard Paltauf (1858–1924).

In 1893 he provided a comprehensive description of lymphosarcoma, and was able to differentiate it from other disease such as pseudoleukemia and some forms of Hodgkin's disease. Historically, another name for lymphosarcoma was "Kundrat's disease". In the field of gynecology, with George Julius Engelmann, he was the first to document the cyclical changes that take place in the endometrium.

He was the uncle of artist Maximilian Liebenwein, and served a key role in helping him pursue his chosen career.

== Written works ==
- Ueber lympho-sarkomatosis. Wien. kim. Wschr. 6: 211–213, 234–239, 1893.
- Untersuchungen des menschlichen Endometriums; H. Kundrat (1845–1893) und G.J. Engelmann (1847–1903).
