= Moysés Paciornik =

Brazilian physician

- Born: 4 October 1914; Curitiba, PR
- Died: 26 December 2008 (aged 94); São Paulo, SP
- Known for: squatting birth, pap smear
- Scientific career
- Fields: Obstetrics
- Workplaces: Paranaense Center for Medical Research

Moysés Goldstein Paciornik (4 October 1914 – 26 December 2008) was a Brazilian physician. He was born in the city of Curitiba in the Paraná state, located in Southern Brazil. He graduated in Medicine in 1938. In 1959 he founded the Paranaense Center for Medical Research, which he was director. The center was dedicated to the prevention of cancer and gynecological services extended to indigenous reservations in southern Brazil, at which time Moysés became a supporter of squatting birth, noting that the Kaingang indigenous tribe, despite having many children, had firmer vaginal muscles than city women.

He wrote several books and belonged to the Paraná Academy of Arts, to the Brazilian Academy of Medical Writers and was the pioneer of the pap smear screening test in Brazil. At the Federal University of Paraná (UFPR), he founded the chair of Prenatal Care in 1952.

Moysés Paciornik died on December 26, 2008, of cardiac arrest and was buried on the 28th in Curitiba.

His son Claudio Paciornik carries on with his work.

== Publications ==
- (with Claudio Paciornik) Birth in the Squatting Position (1979) Polymorph Films
- (with Claudio Paciornik) Birth and Rooming-In: Lessons Learned from the Forest Indians of Brazil Birth 1983 Summer;10(2):119.
- Commentary: arguments against episiotomy and in favor of squatting for birth. Birth 1990 Dec;17(4):234, 236. and Birth 1991 Jun;18(2):119.
- Use of the squatting position for birth. Birth 1992 Dec;19(4):230-1.

== See also ==
- Childbirth positions
- Hugo Sabatino
