= Free birth =

Free birth may refer to:

- Unassisted childbirth
- Freedom of wombs, laws automatically freeing children of slaves at birth
