= Janet Balaskas =

South African writer

- Born: South Africa
- Occupations: Author, Child educator
- Known for: Founder of the Active Birth Movement

Janet Balaskas is an author, founder of the Active Birth Movement, and childbirth educator. She is perhaps known best for her advocacy of active birth where the woman is free to move during labour, rather than being placed into stirrups or the lithotomy position. She coined the term active birth which she explained in the first of her books Active Birth published in 1983.

Born in South Africa, she is the Director of the Active Birth Centre in London, UK as of 2006.

== Bibliography ==
=== Books ===
- Active Birth. Unwin, London, 1983, ISBN 0-04-612033-5
- New Life - the book of exercises for childbirth. Sidgewick & Jackson, 1983
- The Active Birth Partners Handbook. Sidgewick & Jackson, 1984
- The Encyclopaedia of Pregnancy and Birth (with Yehudi Gordon). Macdonald Orbis, 1987
- Water Birth (with Yehudi Gordon). Unwin Hyman, 1991
- New Active Birth - A concise guide to natural childbirth. Thorsons, 1991, ISBN 978-0722525661

=== Articles ===
- Janet Balaskas, Sophie Hoare, Lyn Durward, Jo Garcia, and Caroline Langridge, "Birth Rights: Radical Consumerism in Health Care," Critical Social Policy, v. 2, n. 5, pp. 62–65 (1982)

== See also ==
- Childbirth positions
- Home birth
- Water birth
