= National Childbirth Trust =

Association caritative britannique

- Formation: 1956; 70 years ago
- Founder: Prunella Briance
- Type: Charitable organisation
- Purpose: Provide practical and emotional support for expectant and new parents
- Headquarters: 30 Euston Square, NW1 2FB
- Region served: United Kingdom
- Website: www.nct.org.uk

The National Childbirth Trust (NCT) is the UK's largest charity offering information and support in pregnancy, childbirth and early parenthood Since 1956 it has supported millions of parents through birth of their children and through early parenthood while bringing about advances in professional practice and public policy. The charity's mission is to support parents through the first 1,000 days: from the beginning of pregnancy through to the child's second birthday.

It is a movement of amateur volunteer parents supporting parents, with 327 local branches and over 5,000 volunteers offering a wide range of activities. These include drop-in sessions, sales of baby clothes and equipment, and first aid courses.

NCT's practitioners aim to provide practical and emotional support for expectant and new parents before and after their baby arrives. Its breastfeeding counsellors and peer supporters support mothers with feeding. Its online information centre and national support line provide information to some 5m parents each year.

== History ==
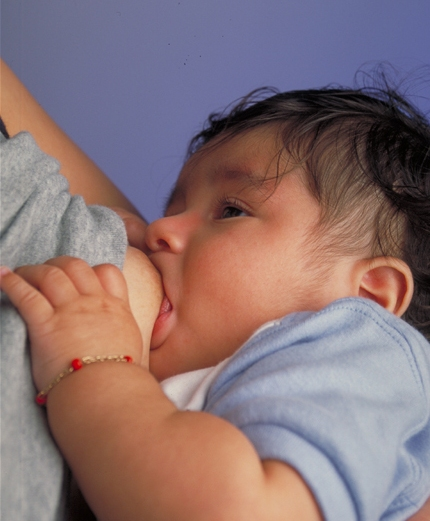
Breastfeeding an infant.

The National Childbirth Trust, originally called The Natural Childbirth Trust, was founded in 1956 as the result of an advertisement placed in The Times by Prunella Briance. Briance had suffered two traumatic childbirth experiences and set about changing the situation for other women, so that they would be more humanely treated during pregnancy and labour. Briance was inspired by the writings of British obstetrician Grantly Dick-Read, who is regarded by many as the father of natural childbirth, and became the first president of the NCT.

Briance's advertisement announced "A Natural Childbirth Association is to be formed for the promotion and better understanding of the Dick-Read system. Anyone interested write Box...". The inaugural meeting was held on 29 January 1957 at Caxton Hall with Grantly Dick-Read as one of the speakers. The NCA became the Natural Childbirth Trust in 1958 and the National Childbirth Trust in 1961.

=== Key dates ===
- 1961 renamed The National Childbirth Trust, given charitable status. Begins publishing leaflets.
- 1967 Breastfeeding Promotion Group and Teachers' Panel formed, setting training standards and services. NCT lobbies Government to research techniques thoroughly and end the overuse of interventions.
- 1980 Postnatal Committee set up, leading to Parentability (support group for disabled parents) and other support groups.
- 1989 NCT incorporated as a company limited by guarantee
- 1991 NCT gives evidence to Winterton Committee based on its own research
- 1994 Report of the Expert Maternity Group, on which Eileen Hutton, NCT's then president, was a member, is adopted as Government policy for England and Wales
- 1997 Antenatal teacher training was validated by the University of Luton
- 1999 Parentability becomes an independent organisation, the Disabled Parents Network.
- 2001 National Breastfeeding Line launched
- 2017 NCT courses are attended by 96,000 parents-to-be and parents. It has 327 branches with over 5,000 volunteers to help support local parents. Its online support reaches 5.6 million users.

== About NCT ==
The charity provides free antenatal and postnatal support and information through its nationwide network of over 300 local branches, run by volunteers.

Baby Cafés, NCT's free feeding drop-ins primarily based in deprived areas, were used by almost 8,000 women in the UK in 2017, providing information and support about feeding. It also provided free of charge training for over 150 women to become breastfeeding peer supporters.

NCT trains peer supporters across the UK to provide support to vulnerable new parents. For example, maternity champions on the Mozart Estate in London's Queens Park; ‘Parents in Mind’ peer support projects to help mums with poor mental health; and a project in Leeds for refugee and asylum-seeking women.

== Criticism and reviews ==
In January 2013, Kirstie Allsopp, presenter of property-related television shows, sparked press comment when she tweeted, "Lots of people have good NCT experiences, but many don't. This is a very politicised, dogmatic, and in my experience scary organisation." There was further press criticism in the Daily Telegraph concerning the TV series In the Club, featuring an antenatal class.

In April 2018, Alex Jones, TV presenter and host of BBC1's The One Show, published a book, Winging It!, which includes a chapter on her NCT experience, "To NCT or not NCT". Her review is very positive about the charity. "It is expensive and a bit middle-class but it’s the best [money] we ever spent." She was part of a multi-cultural, London group, "like the United Nations", who "all left feeling much better equipped to deal with what was ahead".

There was further praise in the press for NCT in June 2018 in the Glasgow Evening Times. Carolyn Lochhead, author of Three Toothbrushes and Other Essays on Motherhood, said: "I didn't know anyone else with children, so the National Childbirth Trust class was fantastic . . . We helped each other through it all - birth, recovery, breastfeeding, weaning, and going back to work. We’re still great friends, five years - and four more babies - later."
