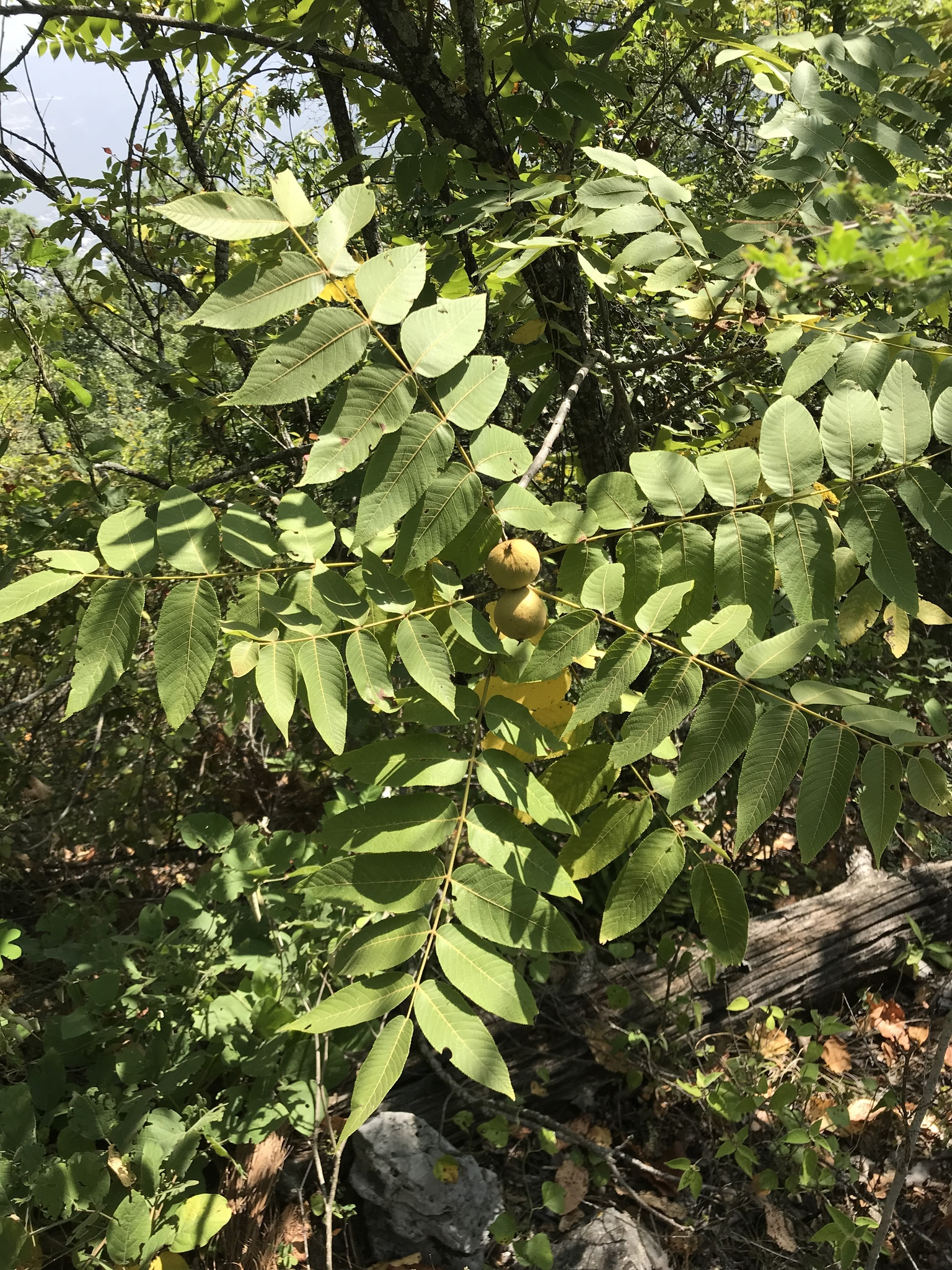

Conservation status
- Least Concern (IUCN 3.1)

Scientific classification
- Kingdom: Plantae
- Clade: Embryophytes
- Clade: Tracheophytes
- Clade: Angiosperms
- Clade: Eudicots
- Clade: Rosids
- Order: Fagales
- Family: Juglandaceae
- Genus: Juglans
- Species: J. mollis

Binomial name
- Juglans mollis Engelm.

Synonyms
- Juglans mexicana S.Watson

= Juglans mollis =

Species of plant

Juglans mollis, the Mexican walnut, is a species of walnut in the family Juglandaceae, native to Mexico. It was first described by Georg Engelmann. Its habitat is in temperate and tropical forests, at elevations of 800–2,500 metres (2,600–8,200 ft).
