= Hugo Sabatino =

Argentine-Brazilian physician (died 2019)

Jose Hugo Sabatino was an Argentine-Brazilian physician, scientist and university professor affiliated to the Medical School of the State University of Campinas, in Campinas, State of São Paulo. Sabatino's main specialty is obstetrics. He has contributed to a new form of natural childbirth delivery method using a squatting position. He published five books. Sabatino died on November 18, 2019.

== See also ==
- Childbirth positions
- Moysés Paciornik
