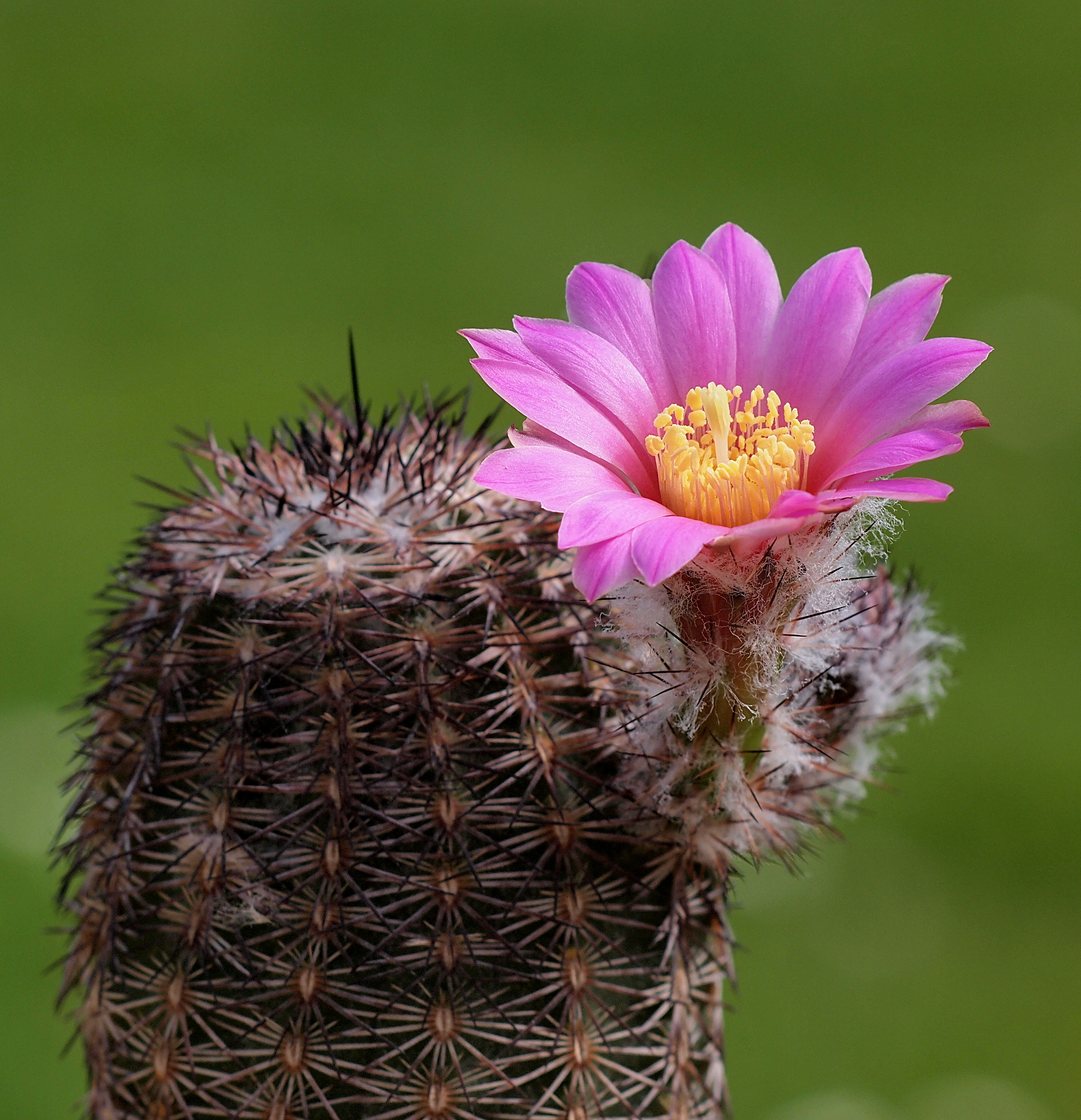

Conservation status
- Least Concern (IUCN 3.1)

Scientific classification
- Kingdom: Plantae
- Clade: Tracheophytes
- Clade: Angiosperms
- Clade: Eudicots
- Order: Caryophyllales
- Family: Cactaceae
- Subfamily: Cactoideae
- Genus: Echinocereus
- Species: E. adustus

Binomial name
- Echinocereus adustus Engelm. 1848

Synonyms
- Cereus adustus (Engelm.) Engelm. 1849; Cereus pectinatus f. adustus (Engelm.) Voss 1894; Echinocereus pectinatus var. adustus (Engelm.) Haage 1861

= Echinocereus adustus =

Species of cactus

Echinocereus adustus is a species of cactus native to Mexico.

== Description ==
Echinocereus adustus typically grows as a solitary cactus. Its shoots are depressed spherical to short cylindrical, reaching up to 19 cm (7.5 in) long and 5 to 12 cm (2.0 to 4.7 in) in diameter, with fibrous roots. It has 11 to 20 wavy, slightly tuberous ribs. The cactus may have up to nine dark brown to blackish central spines, up to 3.2 cm long, with the top spine being very short and the bottom spines spreading horizontally. It also has 8 to 31 white marginal spines with darker tips, up to 1.8 cm (0.71 in) long, with the radial spines being the longest.

The short, funnel-shaped flowers are pink, appearing well below the shoot tips. They are 3 to 10 cm (1.2 to 3.9 in) long and 4 to 7 cm (1.6 to 2.8 in) in diameter, with white or very light green scars. The egg-shaped fruits are up to 2 cm (0.79 in) long with falling thorns, and when ripe, they are almost dry and split vertically.

== Subspecies ==
There are two recognized subspecies:

Image	Scientific name	Distribution
	Echinocereus adustus subsp. adustus	Mexico (Chihuahua)
	Echinocereus adustus subsp. keizerae W.Blum & Dosedal	Mexico (Chihuahua)
	Echinocereus adustus subsp. schwarzii (A.B.Lau) N.P.Taylor	Mexico (Durango)

== Distribution ==
Echinocereus adustus is found growing in sandy loam in grasslands in the Mexican states of Chihuahua and Durango at altitudes between 1,800 to 2,400 m (5,900 to 7,900 ft).

== Taxonomy ==
The species was first described by George Engelmann in 1848. The specific epithet "adustus" is Latin for "blackened" or "burnt," referring to the blackish spines of the cactus.
