= Bradley Method =

Bradley Method may refer to:

- Bradley method of bush regeneration
- Bradley method of natural childbirth
