= Save Lily =

Campaign to regain custody of removed child

Save Lily is an online campaign held by a freebirth parent of Tsang Wai-bong (曾偉邦) and Kwan Pui-sin (關佩仙) in Hong Kong. It urges taking back the custody of their daughter, Lily, who was taken by the Swedish authorities in 2023 due to health conditions and welfare concerns. The Hong Kong authorities arrested the parents in 2026 after they refused to do a DNA test for their son, Danny.

== Timeline ==
=== Background ===
Born in 1983, Tsang Wai-bong is a former physiotherapist. He claimed that he had physiotherapist certification issued by Finland and the UK. Kwan Pui-sin is a former teacher. After dating Tsang, Kwan agreed to move to Finland in 2016. Tsang studied at a university in Finland at the time.

The couple are a part of the freebirth movement. Their first daughter, Constance, was born at their home in Finland in 2019, but died after one month. Finland later charged the couple with "abandonment" and "negligent homicide", but dropped the charge afterwards.

=== Custody of Lily ===
The couple's second daughter, Lily, was also born at home in October 2021. She did not have a birth certificate since the Finnish authorities believed that Lily was a Hong Kong resident rather than a local Finnish resident. The family moved to the Finland–Sweden border after the refusal.

In December 2023, the Swedish authorities arrested the couple when they found a large amount of cash, and removed Lily from the couple due to health conditions and welfare concerns over the child. Lily lived with an adoptive family in Sweden. In March 2024, Linköping court supported Swedish authorities. The couple later moved to Hong Kong and launched an online campaign called "Save Lily", attempting to take Lily back. Their campaign caught public attention in 2026.

=== Danny ===
The couple's third child and first son, Danny, was born in April 2026. They refused to take a DNA test for Danny's birth registration due to privacy concerns and their religious beliefs. Danny was, therefore, not registered in Hong Kong for weeks. According to an interview with Commercial Radio Hong Kong on 2 June 2026, Tsang claimed that he would take a DNA test for Danny only if the Hong Kong Court of Final Appeal order them to do so.

On the same day, Hong Kong police arrested the couple for child neglect and not registering Danny's birth. In Hong Kong, it is a criminal offence for anyone to deliberately fail to register the birth of a child. The couple first opposed the DNA tests, but eventually agreed on 3 June. The Hong Kong government later confirmed that the couple are Danny's biological parents.

On 26 June 2026, the West Kowloon Magistrates' Courts ordered that Danny's protection order be extended for three years, meaning the couple lose custody of Danny for 3 years.

== Reception ==
Peter Douglas Koon criticised the couple as "abnornal" and "unthinkable". He also supported the Swedish authorities taking Lily, believing that they are protecting children.

Initium Media cited a commentary by Wong Kwun Lun (黃冠麟) of HK01, who described the action from Swedish authorities as the "last resort maintaining safety net" (最後安全網) for parents who failed to guarantee a basic living for a child. Wong also suggested that "protecting children is a universal consensus in civil society".

Doreen Kong expressed her opinion in Hong Kong Economic Journal over Save Lily, noting that public attention over the incident shifted from Lily's custody to concerns about Danny's environment. She suggested that it reflects society's growing trend toward child protection. She also compared the intervention threshold for child protection between Hong Kong and Singapore.
