= Richard Paltauf =

Austrian pathologist and bacteriologist

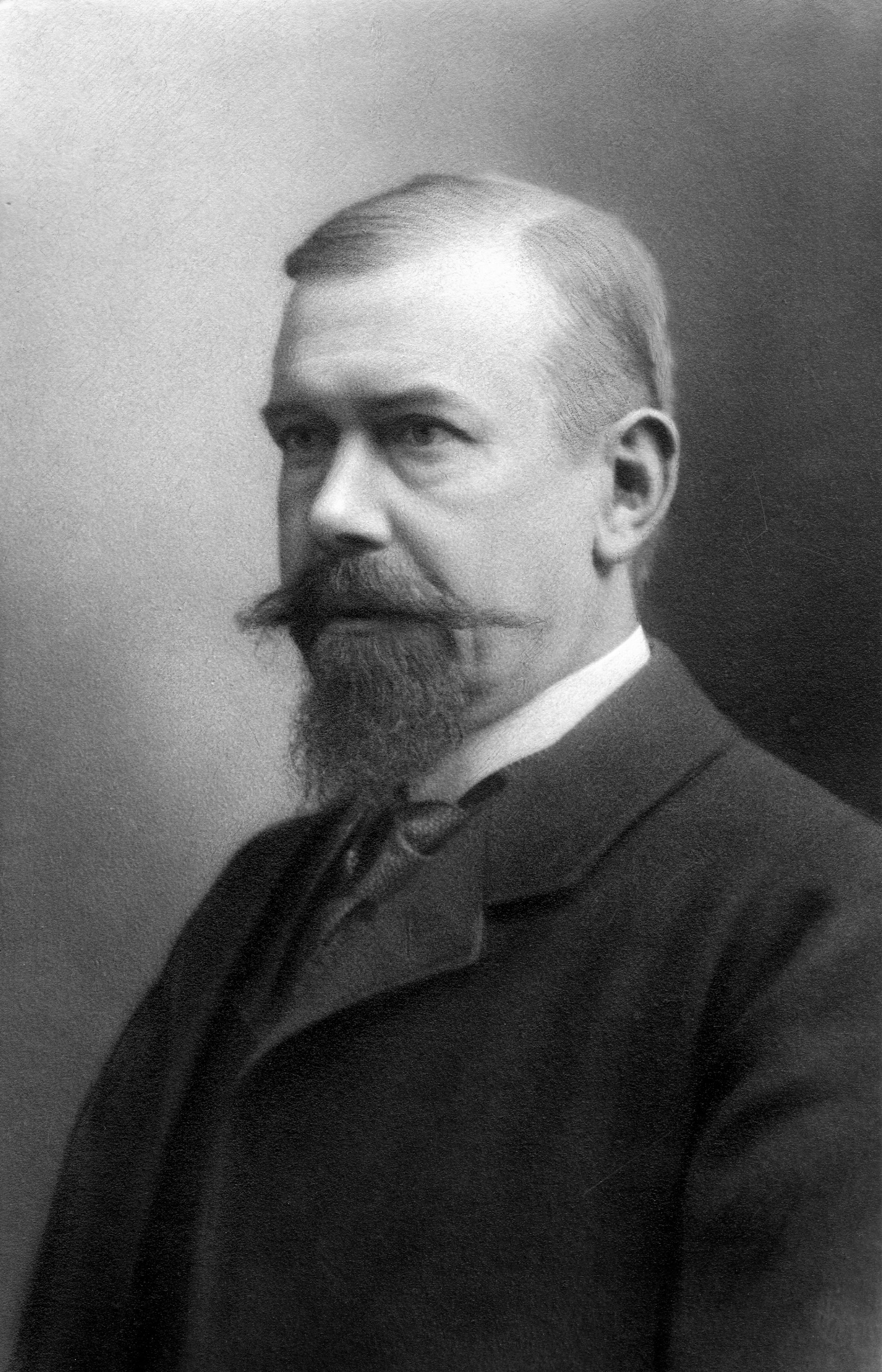
Richard Paltauf

Richard Paltauf (9 February 1858 – 21 April 1924) was an Austrian pathologist and bacteriologist.

== Biography ==
Paltauf was born on 9 February 1858, in Judenburg, Styria.

In 1880 he received his medical doctorate at the University of Graz, and from 1881 to 1883 was an assistant to pathologist Hans Kundrat (1845–1893) in Graz. Afterwards, he remained as Kundrat's assistant at the University of Vienna, where in 1888 he obtained his habilitation in pathological anatomy. In 1892 he became an associate professor of general pathology and pathological histology, and during the following year became head of the institute for pathological histology and bacteriology. From 1900 until his death in 1924 he was a full professor of general and experimental pathology.

With Anton Weichselbaum (1845–1920), he was responsible for introducing bacteriology and serology at Vienna. Also he founded a serotherapeutical institute as well as an institution for vaccination against rabies. With Carl Sternberg (1872–1935), he conducted important research of lymphogranulomatosis.

Paltauf died on 21 April 1924.

== Written works ==
- Lymphosarkom (Lymphosarkomatose, Pseuloleukämie, Myelom, Chlorom). Ergebnisse der allgemeinen Pathologie und pathologischen Anatomie der Menschen und der Tiere, 1897, 3, 1 Heft: 652–691.—On lymphosarcoma.
- Ein Fall von Mycosis fungoides mit Erkrankung von Nerven und mit Lokalisation in den inneren Organe, (with Gustav Scherber) in Virchows Archiv (1916).—On mycosis fungoides.
- Paltauf was the author of a highly regarded chapter on agglutination in the Handbuch der pathogenen Mikroorganismen by Wilhelm Kolle (1868–1935) and August von Wassermann (1866–1925). He also wrote a treatise on the pathology of blood, published in the Krehl-Marchand Handbuch der allgemeinen Pathologie, and contributed information on the formation of new skin to the Handbuch der Hautkrankheiten by Franz Mracek (1848–1908).
