= Prunella Briance =

Woman health activist

Prunella Mary Briance
- Briance in 2016 by Virginia Campbell (fair use)
- Born: 31 January 1926
- Died: 14 July 2017 (aged 91); London
- Known for: Childbirth campaigner, Founder of The National Childbirth Trust

Prunella Mary Briance (née Chapman) (1926–2017) was the British founder of the National Childbirth Trust and a passionate campaigner to improve the health of women and their experience in childbirth.

== Early life ==
Briance was born on 31 January 1926, in Putney, London, to Eric Haldane Chapman (1887 -1961), a major (later colonel) in the British army, and Vera Lyndall, née Archbold. The family moved to India when Briance was still young, though she returned to England for her secondary education, joining the Women's Royal Naval Service during the Second World War. After the war she studied Russian at London University and that was where she met and married John Briance, a diplomat. The couple lived in Iran, then Cyprus, then London where Briance had two pregnancies, one of which ended in her baby girl dying. They had one son, Richard Briance.

== Activism for maternal health ==
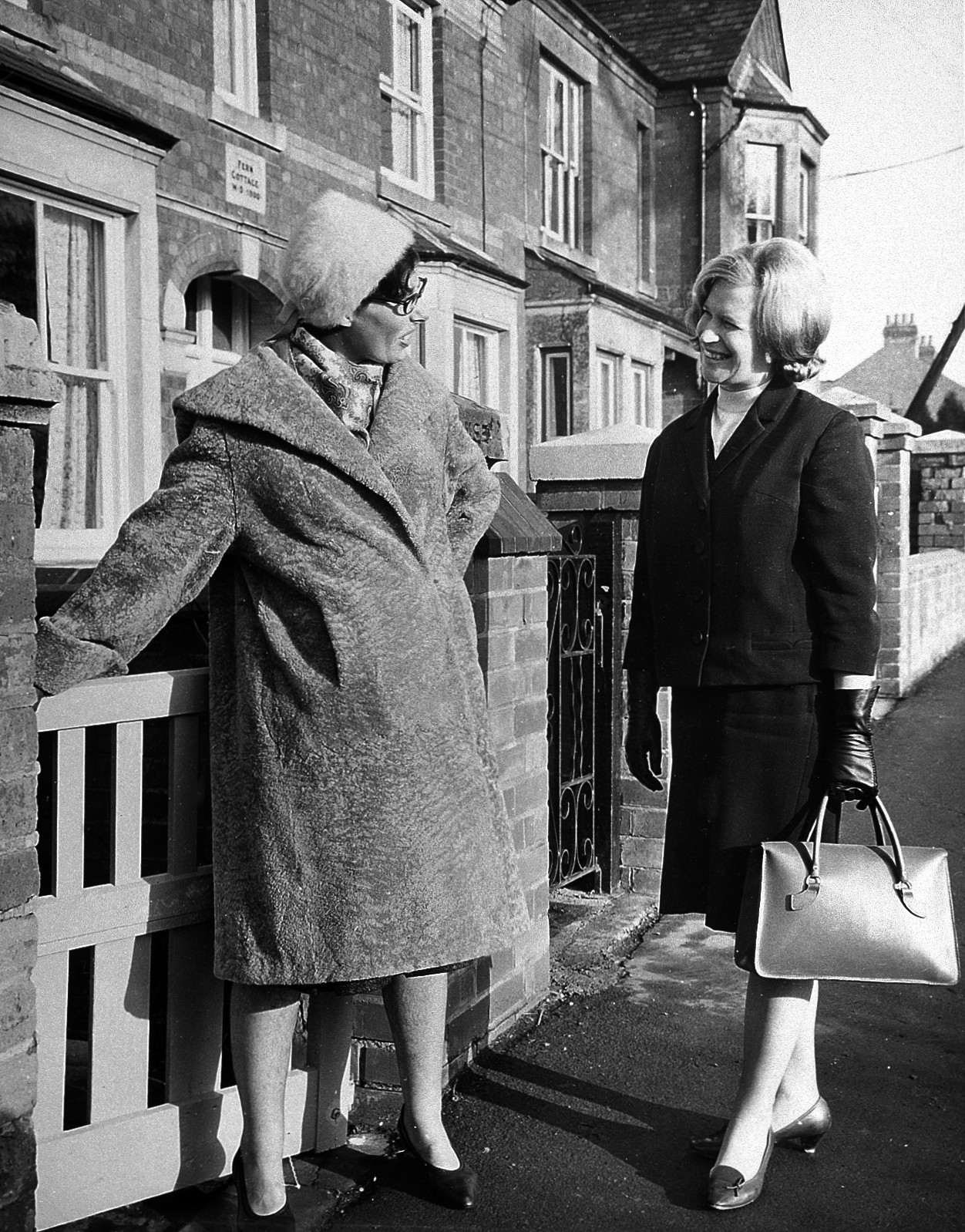
"Invitation to attend antenatal classes"

The NCT (Natural Childbirth Association of Great Britain, later changed to the National Childbirth Trust) was founded in 1956 and is a prominent organisation in the UK which provides ante and post natal support for parents. Briance's work changed the landscape of healthcare provision for maternal health.

Briance suffered two traumatic childbirth experiences, her first delivery in Cyprus, where she overheard doctors and nurses discussing if she would die, but despite trauma had a health baby boy, and two years later in London, where she was harmed during the labour and her baby girl shortly died. Due to these experiences, Briance was determined to change the situation for other women, and successfully raised awareness of options to mothers and fathers during birth. She began by advertising in The Times and Daily Telegraph newspapers to find other mothers and supporters to found a new organisation. The response was overwhelming and the launch was commended by many women, including a telegram of 'good luck' from the Queen.

The organisation ran classes for parents based on research from gynaecologist Dr. Grantly Dick-Read, on reducing pain of childbirth in a less medicated manner, with the women leading on decisions in their care. Early NCT teachers included his wife Jessica Dick-Read and Sheila Kitzinger, social anthropologist who authored many books on childbirth and childcare. However the medical profession was not so supportive of the notion that a 'natural' birth did not included appropriate medical advice, where needed, and their supporters were challenged by the British Medical Association, so the name was changed to the National Childbirth Trust.

Dick-Read and Briance had left but the organisation grew steadily over the years to 8,000 members in the 1970s and by the 1980s, 240 local and regional branches, most including both parents in classes about anatomy and physiology, pain control and a partner's role in care. By 2016, the NCT had 300 branches across the UK and Channel Islands and over 100,000 members. Many of Briance's most radical ideas at the time (such as having fathers present in labour wards) are now accepted as common practice, and the overall approach of woman-centred maternity care was endorsed by Government research published in 1993 and became British health care policy.

In 1982, Briance self-published a book Childbirth with confidence: What every woman should know about childbirth, from her presentation at the 6th International Congress of Psychosomatic Obstetrics and Gynaecology in the Reichstag, West Berlin, Germany. The foreword by Professor D.W. Winnicot paediatrician and psychoanalyst stated that only 3% of births to healthy women required medical interventions. Since that period, NCT have continued to influence popular and professional books on maternity care from the work in educating parents-to-be and obstetrics service staff, following the examples of Dick-Read and Briance. The 2011 Scottish government review of health policy including 'pathways of care which are person-centred', a programme called 'Keeping Childbirth Natural and Dynamic (KCND). Credit is also given to the NCT in influencing changes in the birth experiences of women over the last 40 years.

Their model of small social group learning, whilst adding peer pressure, also gives social support for new parents e.g. preparing for breast-feeding are now linked into the NHS advice, and NCT influenced the Equality Act to give breastfeeding women rights to do so in public, without discrimination. NCT also responded formally to the Government report: Midwifery 2020, still echoing Briance's call for health care services to 'make having a baby a more community-focused, personal and positive experience.'

== Death and archive ==
Briance died aged 91 in 2017. The archives of the NCT are held at the Wellcome Library in London.
