= Edward Kowalski =

American medical academic

Edward Kowalski (1915–1998) was an American professor of medicine specializing in gynecology and obstetrics. He published 103 publications in medical journals, as well as three books.
