= Free Birth Society =

US-based advocacy group

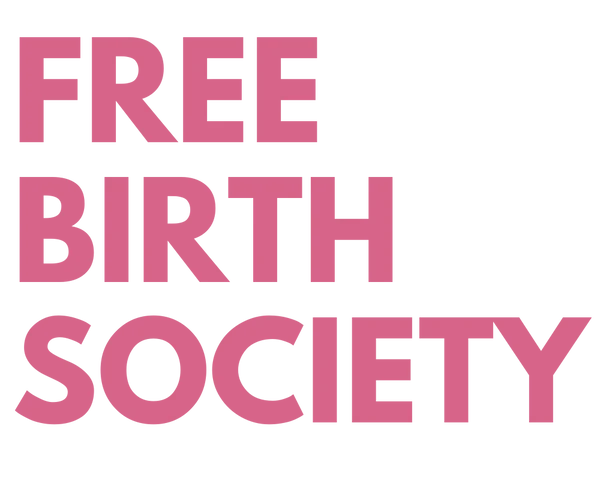
- Formation: 2017; 9 years ago
- Founder: Emilee Saldaya
- Type: Free birth advocacy
- Location: North Carolina, US

The Free Birth Society (FBS) is a US-based company that advocates for childbirth without medical assistance, also known as free birth. The FBS sells online courses and private consultations and produces podcasts and social media content.

FBS was founded in 2017 by influencer and former doula Emilee Saldaya, who does not have medical training. (Note: Saldaya and her business partner and FBS instructor, Yolande Norris-Clark, are both former doulas. NBC News reported in 2020 that the two do not "appear to have medical experience or expertise.") A 2025 investigation by Guardian journalists found at least 48 instances of stillbirths, neonatal fatalities, or other "serious harm" that were seemingly linked to FBS. As part of the investigation, medical experts said that FBS content included "misleading" or "dangerous" guidance, and that Saldaya and business partner Yolande Norris-Clark made "false or dangerous claims about hemorrhage, shoulder dystocia, retained placenta and infant resuscitation". The American College of Nurse-Midwives, the American Academy of Pediatrics, and the American College of Obstetricians and Gynecologists agree that "hospitals and accredited birth centers are the safest settings for birth" in the US.

== Activities ==
The Free Birth Society advocates the practice of unassisted childbirth, also known as free birth, in which a medical birth attendant does not assist with the birth. The New York Times in 2026 called the group the "most prominent promoter of the method" among influencers. The organization, formed in 2017, is based in North Carolina, US. It has sold online courses, private consultations, and access to its closed Internet forum, and has produced podcasts and social media content.

In the online community associated with the organization, women provide support for giving birth outside the hospital. In 2025, its social media account was reported to have more than 132,000 followers while its podcast, one of the largest podcasts on birth, had been downloaded more than 5 million times. Some women have also shared poor childbirth experiences in unofficial venues including a Reddit forum and an online group named "Free Birth Society Scam".

== Medical claims and reception ==
=== Qualifications of FBS employees ===
NBC News reported in 2020 that both the FBS's founder, influencer Emilee Saldaya, and her Canadian business partner and FBS instructor, Yolande Norris-Clark, both former doulas (a non-medical birth worker), did not have medical training. FBS-trained "birth attendants" claim not to advertise themselves as licensed midwives, but because they dispense advice around pregnancy and birth, some mothers assume they are medically trained and able to assist in emergencies. The Cleveland Clinic website states that the American College of Nurse-Midwives, the American Academy of Pediatrics, and the American College of Obstetricians and Gynecologists agree that "hospitals and accredited birth centers are the safest settings for birth" in the country but do "offer clinical guidance in hopes that it leads to the best possible outcome" for those who opt for a home birth.

=== The Guardian investigation ===
A 2025 investigation by Guardian journalists found at least 48 instances of stillbirths, neonatal fatalities, or other "serious harm" that were seemingly linked to FBS. According to the Guardian, medical experts said that FBS content included "misleading" or "dangerous" guidance, and that Saldaya and business partner Yolande Norris-Clark previously made "false or dangerous claims about hemorrhage, shoulder dystocia, retained placenta and infant resuscitation". Responding to an inquiry from the media outlet, Saldaya stated that "Some of these allegations are false or defamatory"; after the investigation's publication, Saldaya made a statement on Instagram that addressed "propaganda on mainstream news".

The Guardian also found that some trusts within the United Kingdom's National Health Service had been directing women who were considering free birth to a website that contained a weblink to the FBS podcast. The link has since been removed and a statement was released on the information.

=== Political views ===
The New York Times critic-at-large Amanda Hess observed in her book Second Life: "The [FBS] once issued palatable progressive statements, emphasizing that they were inclusive of everyone who gives birth... But after I started following the society, in 2020, the language of inclusivity seemed muted in favor of antivaccine conspiracy theorizing, critique of internet woke culture, and protest against transgender ideology." The organization's Instagram account made a post which celebrated the 2024 announcement of Robert F. Kennedy Jr., a prominent anti-vaccine activist, as the U.S. health secretary during the second presidency of Donald Trump.
