= Natural childbirth =

Childbirth without routine medical interventions, particularly anesthesia

Natural childbirth is childbirth without routine medical interventions, particularly anesthesia. Natural childbirth re-emerged in opposition to the medical model of childbirth that is common in industrialized societies. Natural childbirth attempts to minimize medical intervention, particularly the use of anesthetic medications and surgical interventions such as episiotomies, forceps, ventouse deliveries, and caesarean sections. Natural childbirth may occur during a physician or midwife attended hospital birth, a midwife attended homebirth, or an unassisted birth.

Natural childbirth is seen by some as empowering and a way to push back against paternalism and lack of patient say in the medical system. Other commentators describe it as a way to judge and shame women who need or choose medical interventions. Home births specifically are associated with increased risks compared to hospital births, including a threefold to fourfold increased risk of death for the infant in the first 28 days of life.

== History ==
Historically, most women gave birth at home without emergency medical care available, and in developing countries, this is still a common way of giving birth, with an estimated 28% of births in developing countries taking place at home. In the United States, the proportion of births taking place in hospitals rose so that whereas in 1900, 5% of births took place in hospitals, by 1935, the majority of births took place in hospitals. The "natural" rate of maternal mortality—meaning without surgical or pharmaceutical intervention—has been estimated at 1,500 per 100,000 births. In the United States circa 1900, before the introduction and improvement of modern medical technologies, there were about 700 maternal deaths per 100,000 births (0.7%).

At the onset of the Industrial Revolution, giving birth at home became more difficult due to congested living spaces and dirty living conditions. This drove urban and lower-class women to newly available hospitals, while wealthy and middle-class women continued to labor at home. In the early 1900s there was an increasing availability of hospitals, and more women began going into the hospital for labor and delivery. In the United States, the middle classes were especially receptive to the medicalization of childbirth, which promised a safer and less painful labor. The use of childbirth drugs began in 1847 when Scottish obstetrician James Young Simpson introduced chloroform as an anesthetic during labor, but only the richest and most powerful women (such as Queen Victoria) had access.

The term "natural childbirth" was coined by obstetrician Grantly Dick-Read upon publication of his book Natural Childbirth in 1933. In the book, Dick-Read defined the term as the absence of any intervention that would otherwise disturb the sequence of labor. The book argued that because of "civilized" British women fear birth the birthrate was dropping, and if women were not to fear birth, birthing would be easier since fear creates tension which, in turn, causes pain. In 1942, Dick-Read published Revelation of Childbirth (which was later retitled Childbirth without Fear), advocating natural childbirth, which became an international bestseller. In the late 1940s, he brought his ideas to America, but saw similar ideas with differing names – "pain-free birth" and "prepared childbirth" – were already gaining traction. The appeal of natural childbirth rested in the idea that merging physiological, psychological, social, and spiritual aspects of reproduction would create the best comprehensive care.

The Lamaze method gained popularity in the United States after Marjorie Karmel wrote about her experiences in her 1959 book Thank You, Dr. Lamaze, and with the formation of the American Society for Psychoprophylaxis in Obstetrics (currently Lamaze International) by Karmel and Elisabeth Bing. The Bradley method of natural childbirth (also known as "husband-coached childbirth"), a method of natural childbirth developed in 1947 by Robert A. Bradley, M.D., was popularized by his book Husband-Coached Childbirth, first published in 1965.

In the 1970s, natural childbirth became a movement associated with feminism and consumerism, stressing obstetrics' lack of concern for the whole person and technology a method for controlling women's bodies. Michel Odent and midwives such as Ina May Gaskin promoted birthing centers, water birth, and homebirth as alternatives to the hospital model. Frédérick Leboyer is often mistakenly believed to have advocated for water births, but he actually rejected the alternative as he felt it was not beneficial to the health of the baby. In 1976, Gaskin wrote the book Spiritual Midwifery, which advocated for natural childbirth.

== Psychological aspects ==
Many women consider natural birth empowering and giving women more control in the birth process, pushing against paternalism in the care given by medical providers.

== Alternatives to intervention ==
Instead of medical interventions, a variety of non-invasive methods are employed during natural childbirth to ease the mother's pain. Many of these techniques stress the importance of "a mind-body connection," which the medical model of birth does not. These techniques include hydrotherapy, massage, relaxation therapy, hypnosis, breathing exercises, acupressure for labor, transcutaneous electrical nerve stimulation (TENS), vocalization, visualization, mindfulness and water birth. Other approaches include movement, walking, and different positions (for example, using a birthing ball), hot and cold therapy (for example, using hot compresses and/or cold packs), and receiving one-on-one labor support like that provided by a midwife or doula. Natural childbirth proponents maintain that pain is a natural and necessary part of the labor process, and should not automatically be regarded as entirely negative. In contrast to the pain of injury and disease, they believe that the pain of childbirth is a sign that the female body is functioning as it is meant to.

Birth positions favored in natural childbirth—including squatting, hands and knees, or suspension in water—contrast with the supine lithotomy position (woman in hospital bed on her back with legs in stirrups). Supine positions, on average, when compared to upright positions, have been shown in a Cochrane review to be associated with a 6.16 minute longer duration of the second stage of labor and an increased incidence of some labor complications but a decreased incidence of other complications. Methods to reduce tearing during natural childbirth (instead of an episiotomy) include managing the perineum with counter-pressure, hot compresses, and pushing the baby out slowly.

== Preparation ==
Some women take birth education classes to prepare for a natural childbirth. Several books are also available with information to help women prepare. A midwife or doula may include preparation for a natural birth as part of the prenatal care services. However, a study published in 2009 suggests that preparation alone is not enough to ensure an intervention-free outcome. Women who choose to do home births appear to take more measures in preparation for their birth compared to women who choose to do hospital births. According to a study of 19 women looking at home and hospital births in Australia, the women who participated in home births had more preparation and expectations compared to those who had hospital births. A mother in this study who had a home birth went to two different antenatal classes, read Spiritual Midwifery (Gaskin, 2002) three times, and knew about home birth and its qualities very well. In contrast, another mother in the study who had a hospital birth did not know what a contraction was. Many of the mothers who had home births reported taking pain management classes, and yoga classes to go into the birth having a positive mindset. They also participated in more antenatal classes than women who went through hospital births. This implies a higher sense of responsibility and control for women who go through with home births.

== Criticism ==
Some argue that the push towards natural childbirth in Western countries has transformed from a way of empowering women into a way of shaming and bullying women who need medical interventions. Some women express shame when not able to have a "natural birth," feeling that their bodies may be defective or lessen the experiences of individuals using assisted reproductive technologies, or who are adoptive parents and parents who use surrogates. The Free Birth Society has been linked to cases of injury during childbirth.

Home birth specifically, even when attended with a midwife, is associated with risks that are not present in hospital births. A United States study of over 13 million births from 2006 to 2009 found that infants born at home have a fourfold higher chance of death in the first 28 days of life compared to infants born at a hospital, and a sevenfold chance of death for firstborns. Another study found that infants born at home have a three times higher chance of death in the first 28 days of life. Additionally, it found that up to 37% of first time mothers and 9% of non first time mothers intending home birth must be transferred to a hospital during childbirth. Home births attended by undertrained midwives are also associated with increased risks compared to those attended by midwives who are highly trained and well-integrated into the healthcare system.

== See also ==
- Bradley method of natural childbirth
- Childbirth positions
- Early postnatal hospital discharge
- Home birth
- Hypnotherapy in childbirth
- Unassisted childbirth
