= Journal of Psychosomatic Obstetrics & Gynecology =

- Discipline: Obstetrics, gynecology
- Language: English

Publication details
- History: 1982-present
- Publisher: Taylor & Francis on behalf of the International Society of Psychosomatic Obstetrics and Gynaecology
- Frequency: Quarterly
- Impact factor: 1.880 (2014)

Standard abbreviations
- ISO 4: J. Psychosom. Obstet. Gynecol.

Indexing
- ISSN: 1743-8942 (print); 1743-8942 (web)
- LCCN: sc83001944
- OCLC no.: 10009972

Links
- Journal homepage; Online access; Online archive

The Journal of Psychosomatic Obstetrics & Gynecology is a quarterly peer-reviewed medical journal covering research in obstetrics, gynecology, and psychosomatics that was established in 1982. The journal is published by Taylor & Francis on behalf of the International Society of Psychosomatic Obstetrics and Gynaecology.

== Abstracting and indexing ==
The journal is abstracted and indexed in: Current Contents/Clinical Medicine, Current Contents/Life Sciences, EMBASE/Excerpta Medica, Index Medicus/MEDLINE/PubMed, PsycINFO, Social Sciences Citation Index, and Science Citation Index. According to the Journal Citation Reports, the journal has a 2014 impact factor of 1.880.
