= Childbirth positions =

Physical posture

Childbirth positions (or maternal birthing positions) are the physical postures that the pregnant female may assume during the process of childbirth. They may also be referred to as delivery positions or labor positions.

In addition to the lithotomy position (on back with feet pulled up), still commonly used by many obstetricians, other positions are successfully used by midwives and traditional birth attendants around the world. Engelmann's seminal 1882 work "Labor among primitive peoples" publicised the childbirth positions amongst primitive cultures to the Western world. They frequently use squatting, standing, kneeling, and all fours positions, often in a sequence. They are referred to as upright birth positions.

Understanding the physical effects of each birthing position on the mother and baby is important. However, the psychological effects are crucial as well. Knowledge about birthing positions can help mothers choose the option they are most comfortable with. Having the agency and self-control to change positions in labor positively influences the mother's comfort and birthing experience, which increases the birthing outcome and her satisfaction with labor.

== Lithotomy position ==
In the lithotomy position, the pregnant woman is lying on her back with her legs up in stirrups and her buttocks close to the edge of the table. This position is convenient for the caregiver because it permits them more access to the perineum.

The position has been largely popular in the US and other Western countries over the last two centuries, though cross-culturally and historically, it is very rare (about 18%) for people to assume a prone or dorsal position during childbirth. Reclining positions became common in France during the 17th century, as obstetrics became a more respected field and ideas of birth being an affliction rather than natural became widespread. The standard of women lying flat on their backs originated in the early 19th century in the US, and was recommended by male obstetricians on the basis of claims that the position was both more convenient for attending medical staff and that women would be more comfortable lying on their backs.

However, the lithotomy is not a comfortable position for most patients, considering the pressure on the vaginal walls because the baby's head is uneven and the labor process is working against gravity. Research suggests that maternal bodily positions have a notable influence on pain experienced during labor and delivery, and that positions such as squatting show significantly reduced pain compared to the lithotomy position.

== Upright birth positions in general ==
Various people have promoted the adoption of upright birthing positions, particularly squatting, for Western countries, such as Grantly Dick-Read, Janet Balaskas, Moysés Paciornik and Hugo Sabatino. The adoption of the non-lithotomy positions is also promoted by the natural childbirth movement.

Being upright during labour and birth can increase the available space within the pelvis by 28–30% giving more room to the baby for rotation and descent. There is also a 54% decreased incidence of foetal heart rate abnormalities when the mother is upright. These birthing positions can also reduce the duration of the second stage of labour as well as reduce the risk for emergency caesarian sections by 29%. They are also associated with the lower need for epidural.

Different positions may be associated with different rates of perineal injury.

== Squatting position ==
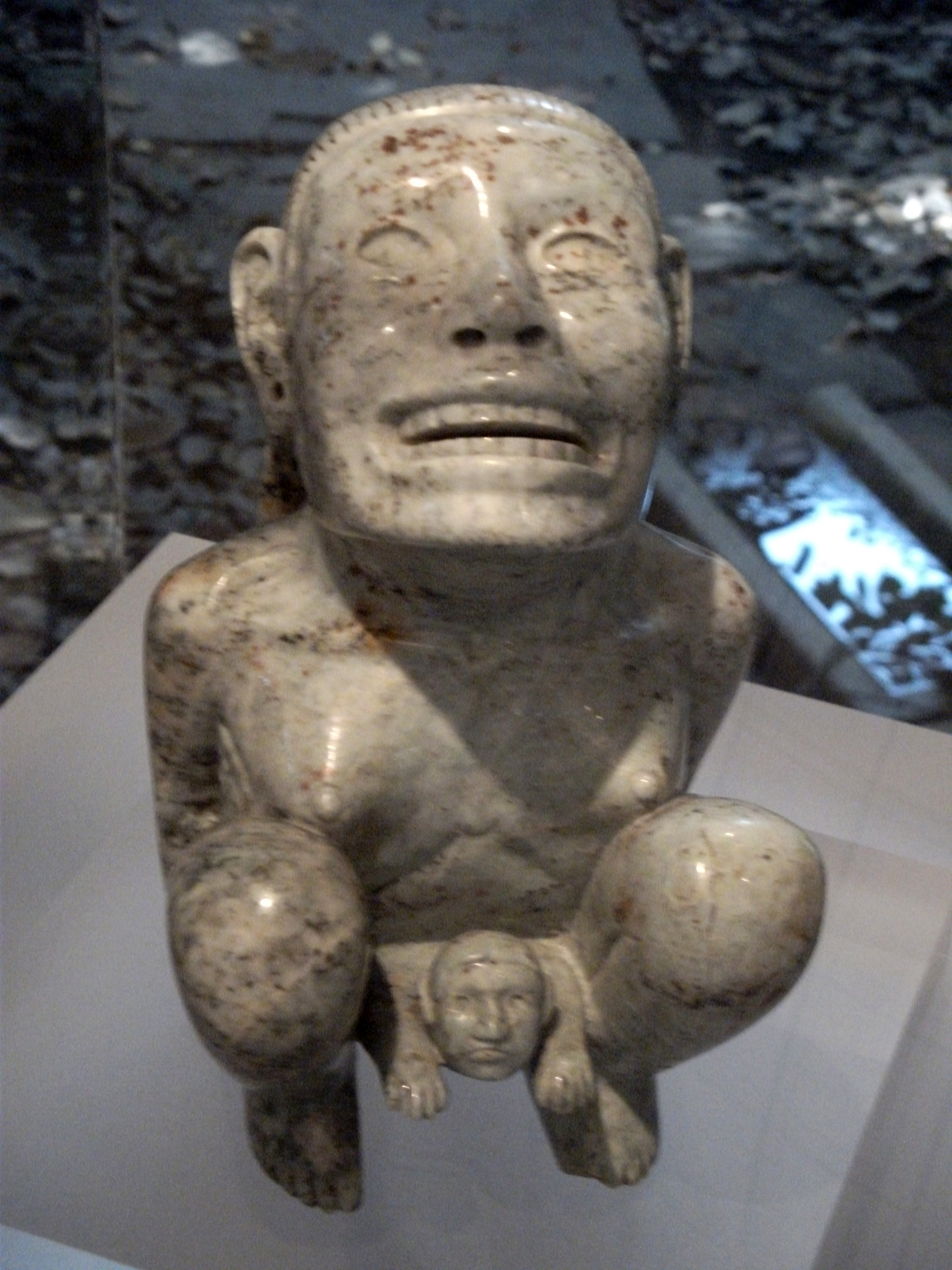
The Dumbarton Oaks birthing figure

The squatting position gives a greater increase of pressure in the pelvic cavity with minimal muscular effort. The birth canal will open 20 to 30% more in a squat than in any other position. It is recommended for the second stage of childbirth.

As most Western adults find it difficult to squat with heels down, compromises are often made, such as putting a support under the elevated heels or another person supporting the squatter.

In ancient Egypt, women delivered babies while squatting on a pair of bricks, known as birth bricks.

== All-fours ==
Some mothers may choose the all-fours position instinctively. It can help the baby turn around in the case of a malpresentation of the head. Since this position uses gravity, it decreases back pain, as the mother can tilt her hips.

== Side lying ==
Side-lying may help slow the baby's descent down the birth canal, thereby giving the perineum more time to naturally stretch. To assume this position, the mother lies on her side with her knees bent. To push, a slight rolling movement is used such that the mother is propped up on one elbow, while one leg is held up. This position does not use gravity but still holds an advantage over the lithotomy position, as it does not position the venae cavae under the uterus, which decreases blood flow to mother and child.

== See also ==
- Defecation postures
- Sexual positions
- Female urination device, enabling an atypical standing position for female urination
