= Systems Biology in Reproductive Medicine =

- Discipline: Reproductive medicine
- Language: English
- Edited by: S. A. Krawetz

Publication details
- History: 1978–present
- Publisher: Taylor & Francis
- Frequency: Continuous
- Impact factor: 2.2 (2024)

Standard abbreviations
- ISO 4: Syst. Biol. Reprod. Med.

Indexing
- ISSN: 1939-6376 (print); 1939-6368 (web)

Links
- Journal homepage; Online access; Online archive

Systems Biology in Reproductive Medicine is a peer-reviewed medical journal that covers the use of systems approaches including genomic, cellular, proteomic, metabolomic, bioinformatic, molecular, and biochemical, to address fundamental questions in reproductive biology, reproductive medicine, and translational research. The journal publishes research involving human and animal gametes, stem cells, developmental biology, toxicology, and clinical care in reproductive medicine. The editor-in-chief is S. A. Krawetz (Wayne State University). According to the Journal Citation Reports, the journal has a 2024 impact factor of 2.2.
