= Academia Brasileira de Médicos Escritores =

The Academia Brasileira de Médicos Escritores (Brazilian Academy of Medical Writers) was founded on November 26, 1987 and officially installed on May 26, 1989, in the city of Rio de Janeiro. The academy brings together writers in Brazil who are also medical professionals.

It is the first academy in Brazil, and the world, that uniquely brings together writers who are also health professionals.

Abrames is affiliated with the Association of Brazilian Academies of Arts (Associação das Academias de Letras do Brasil).

== History ==
The creation of an academy of medical writers was designed by the physician Matheus Vasconcelos, who first brought up the idea to the regional Rio de Janeiro of Brazilian Society of Medical Writers.

Since then, a group formed by Matheus Vasconcelos himself with Marco Aurelio Caldas Barbosa, Miguel Callile Junior, Tito de Abreu Fialho, Maria José Werneck, Luiz de Araujo Gondim Lins, Perilo Galvão Peixoto and Syllos Sant'anna Reis went to meet as the organizing committee of the academy then gestated.

Matheus Vasconcelos and Miguel Callile Junior died before installation of the academy, becoming the patrons of their seat.

== Patrons and members ==
The Abrames is composed of fifty seats, with the principle of tenure changed, creating the membership emeritus, occurs when the vacancy of the seat without its owner, still alive, miss the academic condition.

== Bibliographic reference ==
- BEGLIOMINI, HELIO. Imortais da Abrames. Rio de Janeiro:Expressão e Arte Editora, 2010.
