= Lithotomy position =

Position for medical examinations and procedures

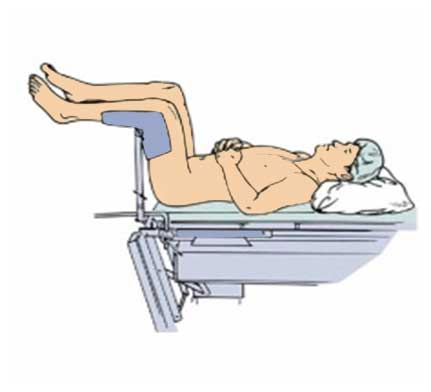
Lithotomy position.

The lithotomy position is a common position for surgical procedures and medical examinations involving the pelvis and lower abdomen, as well as a common position for childbirth in Western nations. The lithotomy position involves the positioning of an individual's feet above or at the same level as the hips (often in stirrups), with the perineum positioned at the edge of an examination table. References to the position have been found in some of the oldest known medical documents including versions of the Hippocratic oath (see lithotomy); the position is named after the ancient surgical procedure for removing kidney stones and bladder stones via the perineum. The position is perhaps most recognizable as the 'often used' position for childbirth: the patient is laid on the back with knees bent, positioned above the hips, and spread apart through the use of stirrups.

The position is frequently used and has many obvious benefits from the doctor's perspective. Most notably, the position provides good visual and physical access to the perineal region. The position is used for procedures ranging from simple pelvic exams to surgeries and procedures including those involving reproductive organs, urology, and gastrointestinal systems. New observations and scientific findings, combined with a greater sensitivity to patient needs, have raised awareness of the physical and psychological risks the position may pose for prolonged surgical procedures, pelvic examinations, and, most notably, childbirth.

== Use for prolonged surgical procedures ==
Some studies have found a significant relationship between prolonged surgical procedures with the patient in the lithotomy position and a circulatory complication known as compartment syndrome. Nerve injury by pressure is also possible, the femoral or peroneal nerve are at risk.

== Use for childbirth ==
A Cochrane Review found that the lithotomy position may not be the ideal position for childbirth, noting that while it makes care easier for physicians by placing the patient in an easily accessible position, it is often harder on the patient as use of the lithotomy position can narrow the birth canal by up to a third. In lieu of the lithotomy position, the Cochrane Review recommended women make informed choices about birthing positions and find the position that is most comfortable for them.

== Use for pelvic examinations ==
Patients have reported feeling a loss of control and an increased sense of vulnerability when examined in the lithotomy position because they cannot see the area being examined. Other, equally effective positions have been suggested for examinations of conscious patients.

== See also ==
- Childbirth positions
