= Lamaze International =

US non-profit organization

- Formation: 1960
- Founders: Elisabeth Bing; Marjorie Karmel
- Type: Non-profit organization
- Purpose: promoting the Lamaze technique of natural childbirth
- Website: www.lamaze.org
- Formerly called: American Society for Psychoprophylaxis in Obstetrics (ASPO)

Lamaze International, formerly the American Society for Psychoprophylaxis in Obstetrics or ASPO*, *was an organization dedicated to promoting the Lamaze method of psychoprophylaxis (mind/pain-blocking) prepared childbirth.. It was co-founded in 1960 by Elisabeth Bing and Marjorie Karmel.

In the late 1980s, the organization, recovering from near-bankrupcy, dropped the psychoprophylactic method of pain- blocking diverging from the basic tenet of the original, authentic Lamaze Method. Instead the name changed to Lamaze International which dropped being a method and became a philosophy embracing 6 Care Practices. As a result, without the pain-blocking tenet, the popularity of the technique waned as it no longer gave couples the preparation to block pain in labor.

To find instructors who teach psychoprophylaxis, look for childbirth educators trained and certified before 1989.
