= Fernand Lamaze =

French obstetrician (1891–1957)

- Born: 1891
- Died: 1957 (aged 65–66)
- Scientific career
- Fields: Obstetrics

Fernand Lamaze (French pronunciation: [fɛʁnɑ̃ lamaz]; 1891–1957) was a French obstetrician, most famous as the popularizer of psychoprophylaxis, a method of childbirth preparation and pain management that bears his name (the Lamaze technique).

== Career ==
Lamaze visited the Soviet Union in 1951. There, he observed a birth using psychoprophylaxis, which had been developed primarily by Soviet psychotherapist I.Z. Velvovskii of Kharkov, Ukraine.

Based on Ivan Pavlov's theory of conditioned response, psychoprophylaxis strove to eliminate the pain of childbirth through education about the physiological process of labor and delivery, through the trained relaxation response to uterine contractions, and through patterned breathing intended to both increase oxygenation and interfere with the transmission of pain signals from the uterus to the cerebral cortex. Lamaze was so impressed by what he witnessed that after he returned to France, he devoted the rest of his life to promoting psychoprophylaxis.

== Criticism ==
Lamaze has been criticized for being over-disciplinary and anti-feminist; "[t]he disciplinary nature of Lamaze’s approach to childbirth is evident from Sheila Kitzinger’s description of the methods he deployed while working in a Paris clinic during the 1950s. According to Sheila Kitzinger, Lamaze consistently ranked the women’s performance in childbirth from 'excellent' to 'complete failure' on the basis of their 'restlessness and screams.' Those who 'failed' were, he thought, 'themselves responsible because they harbored doubts or had not practiced sufficiently,' and, rather predictably, 'intellectual' women who 'asked too many questions' were considered by Lamaze to be the most 'certain to fail.'"
