= George Engelmann =

German-American botanist (1809–1884)

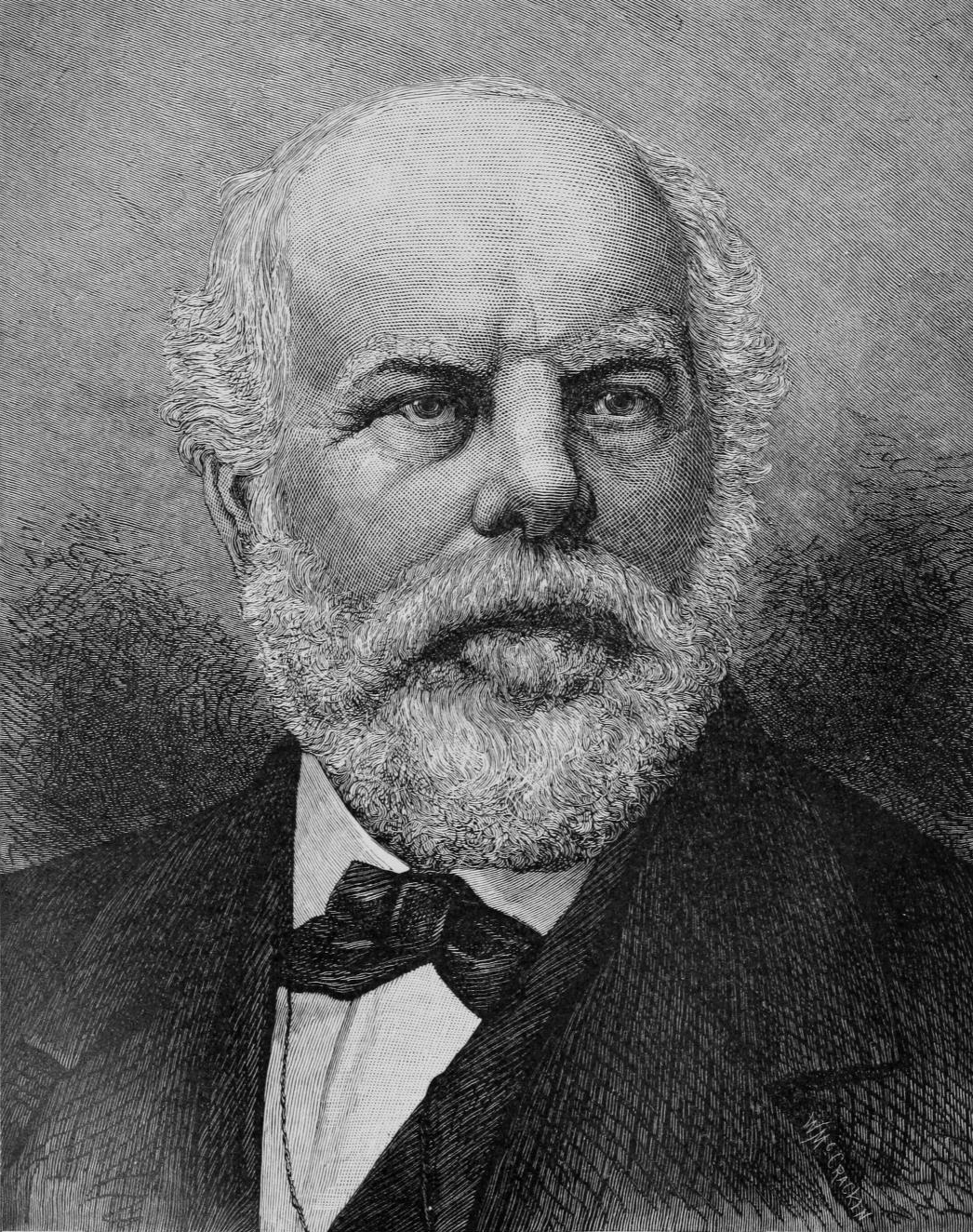
- Born: 2 February 1809; Frankfurt am Main, Free City of Frankfurt
- Died: 4 February 1884 (aged 75); St. Louis, Missouri, USA
- Education: University of Heidelberg, University of Berlin, University of Würzburg
- Known for: Study of Phylloxera vastatrix
- Spouse: Dorothea Horstmann
- Children: George Julius Engelmann
- Parents: Julius Bernhardt Engelmann (father); Julie Antoinette May (mother)
- Scientific career
- Fields: Botany
- Thesis: De Antholysi Prodromus
- Author abbrev. (botany): Engelm.

George Engelmann, also known as Georg Engelmann, (2 February 1809 – 4 February 1884) was a German-American botanist. He was instrumental in describing the flora of the west of North America, then very poorly known to Europeans; he was particularly active in the Rocky Mountains and northern Mexico, one of his constant companions being another German-American, the botanical illustrator Paulus Roetter.

== Biography ==
=== Origins ===
George Engelmann was born in Frankfurt am Main, Germany, the oldest of thirteen children, nine of whom reached maturity. His father, Julius Bernhardt Engelmann, was a member of a family from which for several successive generations were chosen ministers for the Reformed Church at Bacharach-on-the-Rhine. Julius was a graduate of the University of Halle, and was also educated for the ministry, but he devoted his life to education. He established a school for young women in Frankfurt, which was rare at the time. George Engelmann's mother, Julie Antoinette, was the only daughter of Antoinette André and George Oswald May. The latter, in his earlier years, was an artist of note at the Court of Weimar. Julie Antoinette was Julius Engelmann's coadjutor in the school for young women, and its success was largely due to her management and tact.

His cousin, Adolph Engelmann, was a colonel during the Mexican-American War and the American Civil War.

=== Education ===
George Engelmann received his early education at the gymnasium in Frankfurt. According to himself, he first became interested in plants around age 15. He voluntarily devoted much of his time after school duties to studying history, modern languages, and drawing.

Assisted by a scholarship (founded by the “Reformed Congregation of Frankfurt”), in 1827 he began to study sciences at the University of Heidelberg, where he met Karl Schimper and Alexander Braun. With the latter especially an intimate friendship and correspondence were preserved unbroken until Braun's death in 1877. He also retained friendship with Schimper. However, that erratic genius abandoned botany despite obtaining a remarkable grasp of philosophical botany and laying the foundations of phyllotaxy.

In 1828 young Engelmann's studies at Heidelberg were interrupted by his having joined the students in a political demonstration. He thereupon left Heidelberg and entered the University of Berlin, where he stayed for two years. In 1831, he received the degree of MD from the University of Würzburg.

His dissertation for the medical degree, more related to botany than to medicine, was published at Frankfurt in 1832 under the title of De Antholysi Prodromus. It was devoted to morphology — mainly to the structure of monstrosities and aberrant forms of plants — and was illustrated by five plates of figures drawn and transferred to the lithographic stone by the author's own hand. Its subject was so directly in line with that of a treatise on the metamorphosis of plants by Johann Wolfgang von Goethe that it was heartily welcomed by the poet-philosopher, whose own life was then approaching its close. Having received Engelmann's treatise through his correspondent Marianne von Willemer, Goethe inquired after the young author, saying that Engelmann had completely apprehended Goethe's ideas concerning vegetable morphology, and had shown a peculiar genius for their development. So strong was his confidence in Engelmann's ability that he offered to give him his whole store of unpublished notes and sketches.

In 1832 Engelmann went to Paris, where he again became associated with Braun, and also with Louis Agassiz.

=== Emigration to United States ===
Wishing to visit America, he accepted a proposition from his uncles to become their agent for the purchase of lands in the United States. In September 1832, he sailed from Bremen for Baltimore, Maryland. In addition to his duties assessing land investment opportunities, he also spent time on botanical travels, first visiting Thomas Nuttall in Philadelphia. He then went to St. Louis, Missouri, and from there around to the adjacent states. He settled with his relatives and the lawyer Gustav Koerner on a farm in St. Clair County, Illinois near Belleville for three years.

For the purpose of forming a correct judgment of the lands of the new country to which he had come, he made many long, lonesome, and often adventurous horse-back journeys in Illinois, Missouri, and Arkansas. He often suffered sickness and hardship upon those journeys, but he persevered until he finished all the business he had planned to do. He made much use of his scientific, as well as practical, knowledge in the prosecution of that business, doing mineralogical and geological work, but only the botanical notes which he then made were used in his subsequent scientific career.

=== Medical practice ===
Having completed his business engagement, in the autumn of 1835 Engelmann moved to St. Louis and established a medical practice. During the three years that had passed since he left his native land the slender means he brought with him became exhausted, and he began the practice of his profession in absolute poverty. To furnish an office he was even obliged to part with his gun and with the faithful horse which had carried him on so many long and lonesome journeys. At that time St. Louis was little more than a frontier trading post, but Engelmann had strong faith in its future greatness, and he lived to see it become one of the chief cities of the United States. In 1836 he founded a German newspaper called Das Westland, which contained valuable articles on life and manners in the United States, and gained a high reputation both in the United States and in Europe.

Four years were passed before he had laid the foundation of his medical practice and had earned the means of making a visit to his old German home. In 1840 he returned to Germany, where in Kreuznach he married his cousin Dorothea Horstmann on June 11. (Their son George Julius Engelmann became a noted gynecologist.) They soon returned to America. Upon reaching New York City, Engelmann for the first time met Asa Gray, already the most noted of American botanists, and the friendship between those two eminent men thus begun was broken only by death. This friendship is noteworthy because of the evidently beneficial effect which it had upon botanical science in America.

Upon his return to St. Louis with his young wife, Engelmann immediately resumed his medical practice. Then, and long afterward, a large proportion of the inhabitants of St. Louis were of French and German-speaking families, and his familiarity with those languages, as well as with the English, gave him great advantage in extending his practice. Because of this and of his great professional ability, as the years went on he acquired a financial competence that gave him an independence. Never, however, did he take advantage of his success in this respect to lessen his labors, for whenever his medical labors were relaxed his scientific work fully engrossed his attention.

The confidence he inspired in his medical clientele was such that as he grew older he could take long vacations and resume his practice almost at will. After 1869, he no longer kept a medical office and attended the few patients he saw in his study. Still, it was always difficult for him to refuse medical aid to those who sought it, and even up to the last year of his life there were old friends to whose families he was the only acceptable medical adviser and whose appeal for aid he could not refuse. Illustrating this fact, as well as Engelmann's energetic manner, his son relates the following incident: “It was a bitter, sleety winter night, when the ringing of the doorbell awoke me, and I heard an urgent call for father from the messenger of a patient. I would not arouse him, and proposed to go myself; but he had heard all, and, hurrying into his clothes, was ready to go in spite of my remonstrance 'What of the night?' he said, vexed at my interference, 'Am I already useless, to be cast aside? I would rather die in harness than rust out.' So I helped him down the icy steps, through the blinding sleet, into his carriage, and off on his mission of mercy.”

=== Botanical studies ===
Engelmann devoted himself to his medical practice, but in his later years made a specialty of botany. An 1842 monograph on dodders, a very difficult genus to examine, had established his reputation as a botanist. Other taxonomically difficult plants groups that he studied include conifers, cacti, grapes, rushes, yuccas and mistletoes.

He took several vacations from his medical practice and devoted them all to the gathering of data for his scientific work, the details of which were elaborated at his home. One of these vacations extended from 1856 to 1858, the greater part of the first summer having been spent in botanical work at the Harvard gardens and herbarium in companionship with Asa Gray. Then, with his wife and young son, he visited his native land and other parts of Europe, occupying his time with scientific observation and study. In 1868 Dr. Engelmann and his wife again visited Europe for a year, the son being then in Berlin pursuing his medical studies. These visits to Europe were also the occasions of frequent and familiar personal interviews with men whose names were well known to the scientific world, such as Joseph Dalton Hooker, Alexander Braun, De Bary, Virchow, and others.

In 1859, he published Cactaceae of the Boundary which studied cacti on the border of the United States and Mexico. He also made special studies of the pines, rushes, spurges, and other little-known and difficult groups, contributing numerous articles on them to the St. Louis Academy of Sciences, to the American Academy of Arts and Sciences, and to government reports. Material in his specialties collected by the federal government was sent to him for examination. He was one of the earliest to study the North American vines, and nearly all that is known scientifically of the American species and forms is due to his investigations. His first monograph on The Grape-Vines of Missouri was published in 1860, and his latest on this subject shortly before his death. His two major works on cacti remain important today.

He was a founder and longtime president of the St. Louis Academy of Sciences, and encouraged the wealthy St. Louis businessman Henry Shaw to develop his gardens to be of scientific as well as public use; "Shaw's Gardens" became the Missouri Botanical Garden. On a visit to England in 1857, he had consulted with William Jackson Hooker on the establishment of Shaw's gardens, eventually becoming Missouri Botanical Garden's scientific advisor, in addition to his roles as physician and botanist. He was also one of the original founders of the National Academy of Sciences. With Asa Gray and Ferdinand Lindheimer he edited the exsiccata-like series Lindheimer Flora Texana exsiccata.

=== Phylloxera ===
In 1861, Engelmann had published a pioneering paper in the United States examining plant diseases. It focussed on the grape. He also established an herbarium for 10 species of grape (Vitis) he had discovered. Engelmann's comprehensive research on North American Vitis and his lengthy work with the wine industry were parts of his botanical career that dovetailed with his medical career (he prescribed wine as medicine) and had culturally significant implications.

For example, Engelmann played an important, but little known role in rescuing the French wine industry. In the 1870s French vineyards came under attack by a small insect, Phylloxera vastatrix, an aphid-like pest which sucks sap from the roots of grape vines. Growers observed that certain imported American vines resisted this pest, and the French government dispatched a scientist to St. Louis to consult with the Missouri state entomologist and with Engelmann, who had studied American grapes since the 1850s. Engelmann verified that certain living American species had resisted Phylloxera for nearly 40 years. In addition, Vitis riparia, a wild vine of the Mississippi Valley, did not cross pollinate with less resistant species, the cause of previous grafting failures. Engelmann arranged to have millions of shoots and seeds collected and sent to France, where the species proved to be very successful in providing rootstock.

=== Other fields ===
While botanical investigations constituted much the greater part of Dr. Engelmann's scientific work, he always had in hand data for other investigations. For example, he began meteorological observations when he first settled at St. Louis, and personally, or by proxy during his absence, he continued them without intermission until his death — a longer period, it is believed, than that of similar observations by any one man in America.

Engelmann often compared meteorological data with his friend and contemporary Augustus Fendler. The two also collaborated on horticultural experiments on cacti, and frequently corresponded on the matter of specimen collection.

Among the animals he studied were tapeworms (Taenia), the opossum, squirrels and mudpuppies (Menobranchus).

He was elected to the American Philosophical Society in 1862.

=== Later explorations ===
The death of his wife on January 29, 1879, greatly affected him. He turned to plants, seeking relief in study, but life and a continuance of its labors seemed to be almost hopeless. His condition changed but little during the remainder of the winter, but when in the spring C. S. Sargent came with the proposition that he should join him in a journey through the forests of the Pacific Coast region he accepted it. That journey, although a difficult one for a man of his age, was of great benefit to him physically. His shattered spirit also was much revived and, among his friends, he resumed and sustained his lifelong habit of cheerfulness of manner.

== Legacy ==
He is commemorated in the names of several plants, including Engelmann Oak (Quercus engelmannii), Engelmann Spruce (Picea engelmannii), Apache Pine (Pinus engelmannii), Engelmann's quillwort or Appalachian quillwort (Isoetes engelmannii), and Engelmann's Prickly-pear (Opuntia engelmannii).

Engelmann's botanical collection, valuable as containing the original specimens from which many western plants have been named and described, was given to the Missouri Botanical Garden. This gift led to the founding of the Henry Shaw School of Botany as a department of Washington University in St. Louis, where an Engelmann professorship of botany has been established by Shaw in his honor.

Engelmann was interred in Bellefontaine Cemetery in St. Louis.

== See also ==
- Thomas Volney Munson, another phylloxera consultant and grape expert
- Friedrich Adolph Wislizenus, plant collector
