= Lamaze technique =

Childbirth technique

The Lamaze technique, also known as the psychoprophylactic method or simply Lamaze, is a childbirth education approach that emphasises non-pharmacological pain management. It began as a prepared childbirth technique. As an alternative to medical intervention during childbirth, it was popularised in the 1950s by French obstetrician Fernand Lamaze and based on his observations in the Soviet Union. The goal of Lamaze is to build a mother's confidence in her ability to give birth, through classes that help pregnant women understand how to cope with pain in ways that both facilitate labour and promote comfort, including relaxation techniques, movement, and massage.

There is a training and certification program available to practitioners, leading to the Lamaze Certified Childbirth Educator (LCCE) designation.

== History ==
Fernand Lamaze visited the Soviet Union in the 1950s, and was influenced by birthing techniques which involved breathing and relaxation methods. The Lamaze method gained popularity in the United States after Marjorie Karmel wrote about her experiences in her 1959 book Thank You, Dr. Lamaze, as well as Elisabeth Bing's book Six Practical Lessons for an Easier Childbirth (1960). Both Karmel and Bing would later found the American Society for Psychoprophylaxis in Obstetrics in 1960, later renamed to Lamaze International.

== Criticism ==
Lamaze himself has been criticised for being over-disciplinary and anti-feminist. Natural childbirth activist Sheila Kitzinger's description of the methods he deployed while working in a Paris clinic during the 1950s expresses concern regarding "the disciplinary nature" of Lamaze's approach to childbirth. According to Kitzinger, Lamaze consistently ranked the women's performance in childbirth from "excellent" to "complete failure" on the basis of their "restlessness and screams". Those who "failed" were, he thought, "themselves responsible because they harbored doubts or had not practiced sufficiently", and "intellectual" women who "asked too many questions" were considered by Lamaze to be the most "certain to fail".

The Lamaze technique has also been criticised for being ineffective.

== See also ==
- Natural childbirth
- Lamaze International
