= Grantly Dick-Read =

British obstetrician

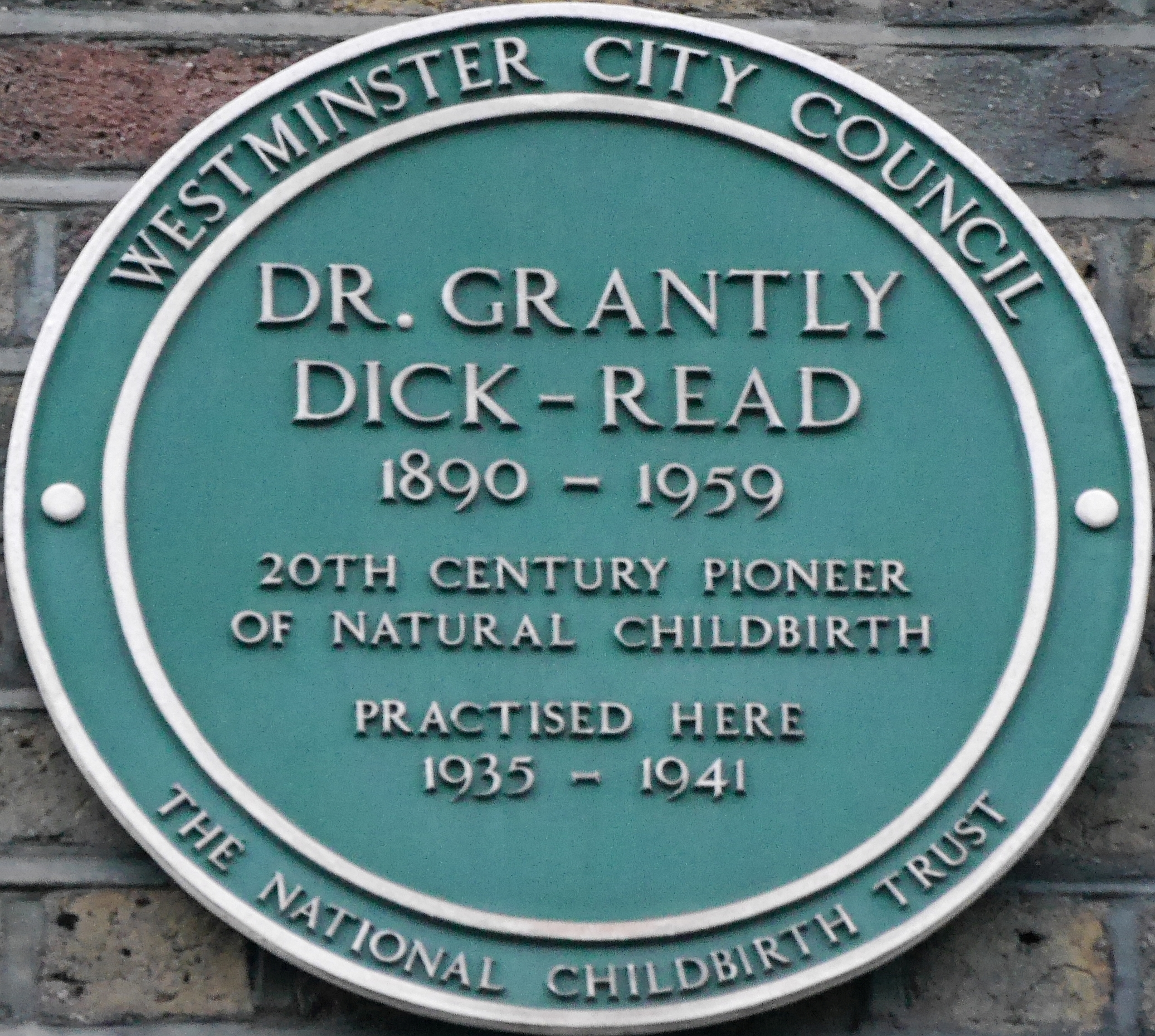
Memorial plaque, 25 Harley Street, London

Grantly Dick-Read (26 January 1890 – 11 June 1959) was a British obstetrician and a leading advocate of natural childbirth.

== Early life and education ==
Dr. Grantly Dick-Read was born in Beccles, Suffolk on 26 January 1890, the son of a Norfolk miller and the sixth of seven children. Educated at Bishop's Stortford College and St John's College, Cambridge, he was an excellent athlete and horseman. He received his medical training at the London Hospital, Whitechapel, where he qualified as a physician in 1914.

== Career and work ==
During World War I, Dick-Read served with the Royal Army Medical Corps. He was badly wounded at Gallipoli but later served in France. When the war ended, he returned to the London Hospital for a year and then completed an MD at Cambridge.

In the early 1920s, he worked at a clinic in Woking and it became very popular. Dick-Read specialised in childbirth and care, observing and writing up case histories and notes. He published his first book Natural Childbirth in 1933, coining the term "natural childbirth." He defined the term as the absence of any intervention that would otherwise disturb the sequence of labor. The book argued that because "civilized" British women feared birth, the birthrate was dropping, and if they were not to fear birth it would be easier since fear creates tension which, in turn, causes pain. Dick-Read's ideas were at first ridiculed, and he was expelled from the London clinic he had set up with a group of fellow obstetricians. When the Woking partnership was dissolved in 1934, Dick-Read set up a private clinic at 25 Harley Street.

His second book, Revelation of Childbirth (which was later retitled Childbirth without Fear), was published in 1942, and aimed at a general readership. It became an international bestseller, and it is still in print. Dick-Read was invited to give lecture tours all over the world.

He moved to South Africa in 1948. In 1953 he returned to England and continued to lecture and write.

In 1956 the UK Natural Childbirth Association, now called the National Childbirth Trust, was founded by Prunella Briance. It became the foremost charity concerned with birth and early parenthood. Grantly Dick-Read was its first president. In 1957, a phonograph album featuring Dick-Read and entitled Natural Childbirth: A Documentary Record of the Birth of a Baby was released by Argo Records in the UK and Westminster Records in the US. It is still available as a CD from Pinter & Martin.

He died on 11 June 1959 aged 69 in Wroxham, Norfolk, at a riverside home that previously had been owned by the UK ukulele entertainer George Formby. A memorial plaque on Dick-Read's former clinic at 25 Harley Street was unveiled on 11 June 1992.

== Criticism ==
Dick-Read has been criticized for being anti-feminist. In his book Motherhood in the Post-War World he wrote, "Woman fails when she ceases to desire the children for which she was primarily made. Her true emancipation lies in freedom to fulfill her biological purposes," as well as stating that tribal women who died in childbirth did so "without any sadness...realizing if they were not competent to produce children for the spirits of their fathers and for the tribe, they had no place in the tribe." He also stated in 1942, "The mother is the factory, and by education and care she can be made more efficient in the art of motherhood."

He also claimed that "primitive" women did not experience childbirth pain, although he did not define "primitive" and never watched women in childbirth in "primitive" societies. Anthropological research has demonstrated this claim to be untrue. There is as much variety in the method and experience of giving birth in so-called “primitive cultures” as there are in Western cultures.

== See also ==
- Childbirth positions
