= Bradley method of natural childbirth =

Obstetrical procedure

The Bradley method of natural childbirth (also known as "husband-coached childbirth") is a method of natural childbirth developed in 1947 by Robert A. Bradley, M.D. (1917–1998) and popularized by his book Husband-Coached Childbirth, first published in 1965. The Bradley method emphasizes that birth is a natural process: mothers are encouraged to trust their body and focus on diet and exercise throughout pregnancy; and it teaches couples to manage labor through deep breathing and the support of a partner or labor coach.

== Principles ==
Teachers of the Bradley method believe that—with adequate preparation, education and help from a loving, supportive coach—most women can give birth naturally, without drugs or surgery. The Bradley method emphasizes measures that can be taken to help keep women healthy and lower their risk for complications that may lead to medical intervention.

The primary goal of the Bradley method is healthy mothers and healthy babies. The method holds that, in most circumstances, a natural (drug-free) childbirth is the best way to achieve that goal. Proponents of the Bradley Method claim that 86 percent of mothers who follow the method have vaginal births without drugs.

Classes teach nutrition, relaxation and natural breathing as pain management techniques, along with active participation of the husband as coach. Parents-to-be are taught to be knowledgeable consumers of birth services and to take responsibility in making informed decisions regarding procedures, attendants and the birthplace.

The method itself is an application of what Dr. Bradley termed "the six needs of the laboring woman": deep and complete relaxation and abdominal breathing; quiet, darkness and solitude; physical comfort; and closed eyes and the appearance of sleep. The method relies heavily on training fathers to be labor "coaches" or partners. Bradley method teachers usually supplement these primary techniques with training in different labor positions and comfort measures. In order to master the ability to relax completely as a pain relief tool, couples are taught several different relaxation techniques and encouraged to practice relaxation daily, so that the mother can rely on a conditioned relaxation response to her partner's voice and touch.

== History ==
Robert Bradley entered the field of obstetrics in 1947, at a time when mothers were restrained in hospital beds and unable to freely move throughout labor due to the medication they were administered. Terming this practice as "knock-em-out, drag-em-out obstetrics", when "twilight sleep" and general anesthesia were common in hospital deliveries, Bradley decided to develop his own method. Having been raised on a farm and witnessed many animal births as a part of farm life, Bradley believed that women, like the non-human animals he had observed growing up, could give birth without drugs or distress. Based on observations of mammals during labor and birth, he developed a childbirth method to teach women to do the things that animal mothers do instinctively.

Soon after starting to implement his new childbirth method with pregnant nurses as a trial, Dr. Bradley began to believe that the presence and support of the father during labor and birth was important to the mother's success in achieving a natural birth. He became a pioneer in including fathers in the birth process and eventually expanded his childbirth method to include extensive instruction of the father as labor coach.

Bradley Method instructors are certified by the American Academy of Husband-Coached Childbirth (AAHCC).

== Sources ==
- Bradley, Robert A. (1996). Husband-Coached Childbirth (4th ed.). New York: Bantam Books. ISBN 0-553-37556-3.
- Hathaway, Marjie; Hathaway, Jay; Bek, Susan Hathaway; Hathaway, James (2002). The Bradley Method Student Workbook. Sherman Oaks, CA: American Academy of Husband-Coached Childbirth. ISBN 0-931560-01-2.
