= PED =

PED, Ped-, or ped may refer to:

== Abbreviations ==
- Parliamentary estates directorate, the body responsible for the buildings and estate of the Palace of Westminster
- Performance-enhancing drugs, substances designed to enhance the metabolism of the human body in certain medical situations
- Personal emergency device, a one-way text paging device used in the mining industry
- Pipeline embolization device, a braided stent used for the treatment of brain aneurysms
- Platform edge door, another term for a platform screen door
- Porcine epidemic diarrhoea
- Pressure Equipment Directive, a set of standards for the design and manufacture of pressure equipment in the European Union
- Price elasticity of demand, in economics
- (S)-1-phenylethanol dehydrogenase, an enzyme
- Phazon Enhancement Device, a fictional apparatus in the science fiction video game Metroid Prime 3: Corruption
- PIN entry device (see PIN pad)

== Codes ==
- PED, IATA code for Pardubice Airport
- PED, ISO 639 code for the Mala language

=== Other uses ===
- An English prefix of Greek origin, meaning "child"
- An English prefix of Latin origin, meaning "foot"
- Ped, a unit of soil structure such as an aggregate, crumb, prism, block, or granule, formed by natural processes
- , a musical symbol indicating use of the sustain pedal on a piano or other instrument so equipped
- Programmer's EDitor, a screen-oriented text editor from Norsk Data

== See also ==
- Pedestal (disambiguation)
- Pedestrian (disambiguation)
- Pedo (disambiguation), various meanings, most prominently as a prefix
- Pes (disambiguation)
