= PES =

Pes (Latin for "foot") or the acronym PES may refer to:

== Pes ==
- Pes (unit), a Roman unit of length measurement roughly corresponding with a foot
- Pes or podatus, a Neume § Neumes representing two notes
- Pes (rural locality), several rural localities in Russia
- Pes (river), a river in northwestern Russia
- Pes (anatomy), zoological term for the distal portion of the hind limb of tetrapod animals
  - Talipes equinovarus (pes equinovarus), clubfoot
  - Talipes cavus (pes cavus), clawfoot
  - Talipes planus (pes planus), flat feet
  - Talipes valgus (pes valgus), valgus deformity of the foot
  - Talipes varus (pes varus), varus deformity of the foot
  - Pes anserinus (leg)
  - Pes anserine bursitis, inflammatory of the inner knee at the bursa of the pes anserinus
  - Parotid plexus, pes anserinus of the facial nerve

== PES ==
=== Education ===
- PES University, formerly P.E.S. Institute of Technology, a university in Bangalore, India
- Providence Elementary School, an elementary school in Chesterfield County, Virginia

=== Computing ===
- Pro Evolution Soccer, a multi-platform video game series developed by Konami
- Packetized elementary stream, part of the MPEG communication protocol
- Peripheral Event System, an implementation of autonomous peripheral operations in microcontrollers
- PSTN Emulation System for IP Multimedia Subsystem (IMS)

== Organizations ==
- Platform for a European Serbia, a political coalition in Serbia
- Postal Express Service, United States military mail during World War I
- Power Engineering Society, now the Power & Energy Society of the Institute of Electrical and Electronics Engineers
- Premier Election Solutions, formerly Diebold Election Systems
- Socialist Equality Party (Parti de l'égalité socialiste), France
- Party of European Socialists, a centre-left European political party
- Social Encounter Party, a Mexican former political party
- Solidarity Encounter Party, a Mexican former political party
- Philadelphia Energy Solutions, the corporate owner of the refinery involved in the 2019 Philadelphia refinery explosion

== Science ==
- Pallasite Eagle Station, a pallasite meteorite grouplet
- Photoemission spectroscopy or Photoelectron spectroscopy, a measurement of a substance's binding energy using the photoelectric effect
- Poly(ethylene succinate), a type of polyester
- Polyester, an artificially produced organic chemical that is spun and woven to make fabric
- Polyethersulfone, a thermoplastic polymer
- Potential energy surface, in physics and chemistry
- Programmed electrical stimulation, a type of electrophysiologic study
- Pseudoexfoliation syndrome, an eye problem

== Other ==
- PES (director) (born 1973), film director and animator born Adam Pesapane
- Passenger Environment Survey, quality-control system for transit systems
- Payment for ecosystem services, incentives offered to farmers or landowners
- Pensarn railway station, Gwynedd, Wales, by National Rail station code
- Performance-enhancing substance, drugs which can provide a mental or physical advantage in a competition
- Price elasticity of supply, a measure used in economics
- Public employment services in the European Union
- PULHHEEMS, a system of grading physical and mental fitness used by Britain's armed forces

== See also ==
- Pez (disambiguation)
