= Pedestal (disambiguation) =

Pedestal is a support or a stand for a statue or other object.

Pedestal may also refer to:

== Science, technology, engineering, architecture ==
- Pedestal crater
- Pedestal desk
- Pedestal table, a table with a single central leg
- Pedestal toilet for sitting, as opposed to squat toilet for squatting
- Camera pedestal, a column with a steerable base used to mount a television camera
- Telecommunications pedestal, a ground-level housing for a passive connection point for underground cables.
- Term used in electronic measurement for the measured value when no input signal is given.

== Art and media ==
- "Pedestal", a song by Aiko from her album Fortune's Child (2023)
- "Pedestal", a song by Alanis Morissette from her album Such Pretty Forks in the Road (2020)
- "Pedestal", a song by Em Beihold (2023)
- "Pedestal", a song by Fergie from her album The Dutchess (2006)
- "Pedestal", a song by Portishead from their album Dummy (1994)
- The Pedestal, a novel by George Lanning (1966)
- "The Pedestal", a poem by Patti Smith from her book The Coral Sea (1996)

== Military ==
- Operation Pedestal, British operation to get vital supplies to the island of Malta in August 1942 during World War II

== See also ==
- Ped (disambiguation)
