= Pedo =

Paedo or pedo may refer to:

- Pedophile, someone who is sexually attracted to prepubescent children

Pedo may additionally refer to:

- Pedo (name)
- Pedo-repair RNA motif in RNA molecules
  - Pedobacter, a genus of Gram-negative soil bacteria
- Saga pedo, a species of bush cricket
- ¡Ando Bien Pedo!, a 2010 studio album by Mexican group Banda Los Recoditos
  - "Ando Bien Pedo", a song from the album
