= Squatty Potty =

Brand name for a type of toilet stool

Squatty Potty, LLC
- Type: Private
- Founded: 2011; 15 years ago
- Founders: Bobby Edwards; Judy Edwards; Bill Edwards
- Website: squattypotty.com

The Squatty Potty is a toilet stool that changes a person's posture to be more squat-like when defecating. More than five million Squatty Potty have been sold.

== History ==
The Squatty Potty was successfully pitched at Shark Tank before its commercial release in 2011. The creator of Squatty Potty, Bobby Edwards, became a millionaire through its popularity. The Squatty Potty markets itself as a method of relieving constipation, claiming that it can "unkink your colon" and cause the user to poop without straining. Specific medical claims made by the company have not been medically tested. The stool has a u-shaped design that allows it to be placed at the base of a toilet. They are made out of plastic, and are seven inches tall. A 2015 ad for the Squatty Potty, entitled "This Unicorn Changed the Way I Poop", went viral and increased sales of the product. The ad depicts a unicorn defecating soft serve ice cream, which is then served to children, and a prince character endorses squatting while pooping. The product has also received multiple celebrity endorsements.

Kathy Griffin was a spokesperson for Squatty Potty. Shortly after the airing of her commercials for the company, she was released from her contract as a result of publishing a video that depicted her holding a simulated severed head of Donald Trump.

In 2026, company founder Bobby Edwards was indicted after an FBI investigation alleged he received child abuse sexual material.

== See also ==
- Squat toilet
