= Squatting position =

Human posture

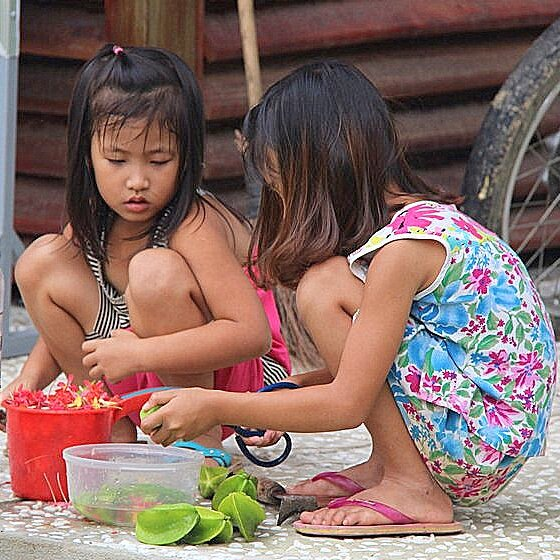
Vietnamese children squatting

Squatting is a versatile posture where the weight of the body is on the feet but the knees and hips are bent. In contrast, sitting involves supporting the weight of the body on the ischial tuberosities of the pelvis, with the lower buttocks in contact with the ground or a horizontal object. The angle between the legs when squatting can vary from zero to widely splayed out, flexibility permitting. Another variable may be the degree of forward tilt of the upper body from the hips. Squatting may be either full or partial.

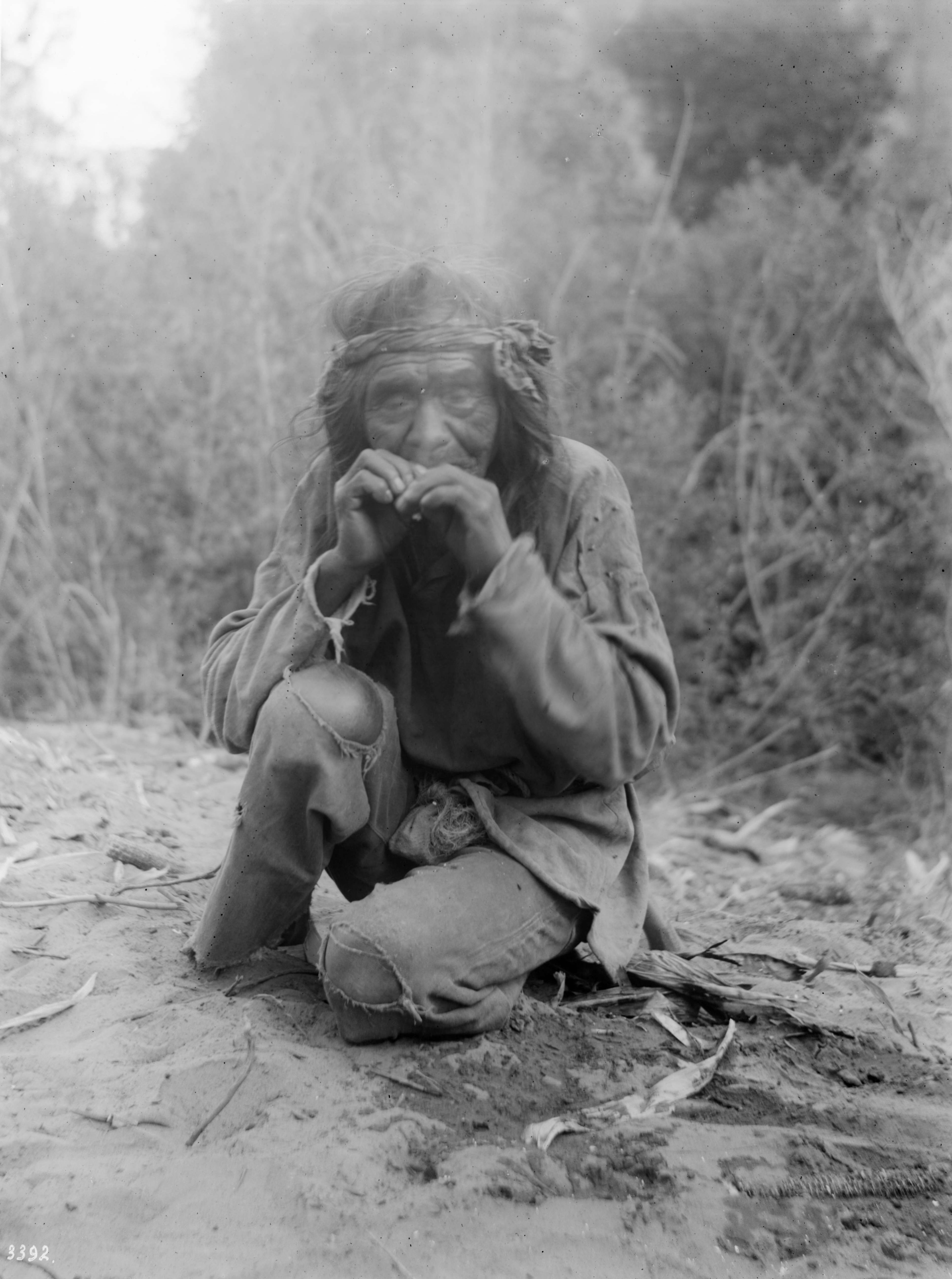
A Havasupai man crouching

Crouching is usually considered to be synonymous with squatting. It is common to squat with one leg and kneel with the other leg. One or both heels may be up when squatting. Young children often instinctively squat. Among Chinese, Southeast Asian and Eastern European adults, squatting often takes the place of sitting or standing.

== Etymology ==
Squatting comes from the Old French esquatir/escatir, meaning to "compress/press down". The weight-lifting sense of squatting is from 1954.

== Resting position ==
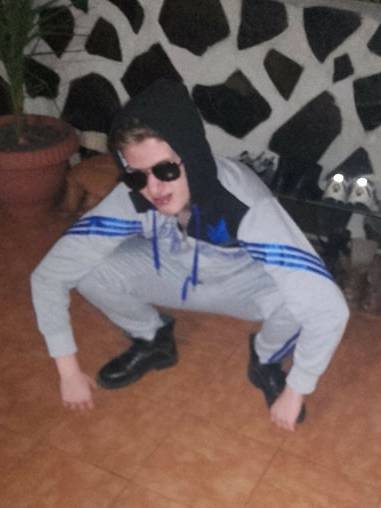
A gopnik "slav squat"

Full squatting involves resting one's weight on the feet with the buttocks resting on the backs of the calves. It may be used as a posture for resting or working at ground level particularly where the ground is too dirty or wet to sit or kneel.

Most Western adults cannot place their heels flat on the ground when squatting because of shortened Achilles tendons which may be caused by habits:

- sitting on chairs or seats
- wearing shoes with heels (especially high heels)

For this reason the squatting position is usually not sustainable for them for more than a few minutes as heels-up squatting is a less stable position than heels-down squatting. See also dorsiflexion.

Desmond Morris distinguished seven variant forms of squat as: Squat-kneel; Flat-footed Squat (the Asian squat, or Slav squat); Tiptoe Squat (the Western squat, or heels-raised squat); Squat-sit; Legs-fold; Lotus position; and Legs Side-curl.

Equivalents to the Slav squat (see Gopnik) in Western culture, sometimes with the hands together in a prayer position, are the rap squat, prison pose, and jail pose. They are often used as photographic poses.

== Exercise ==
=== Strength training ===
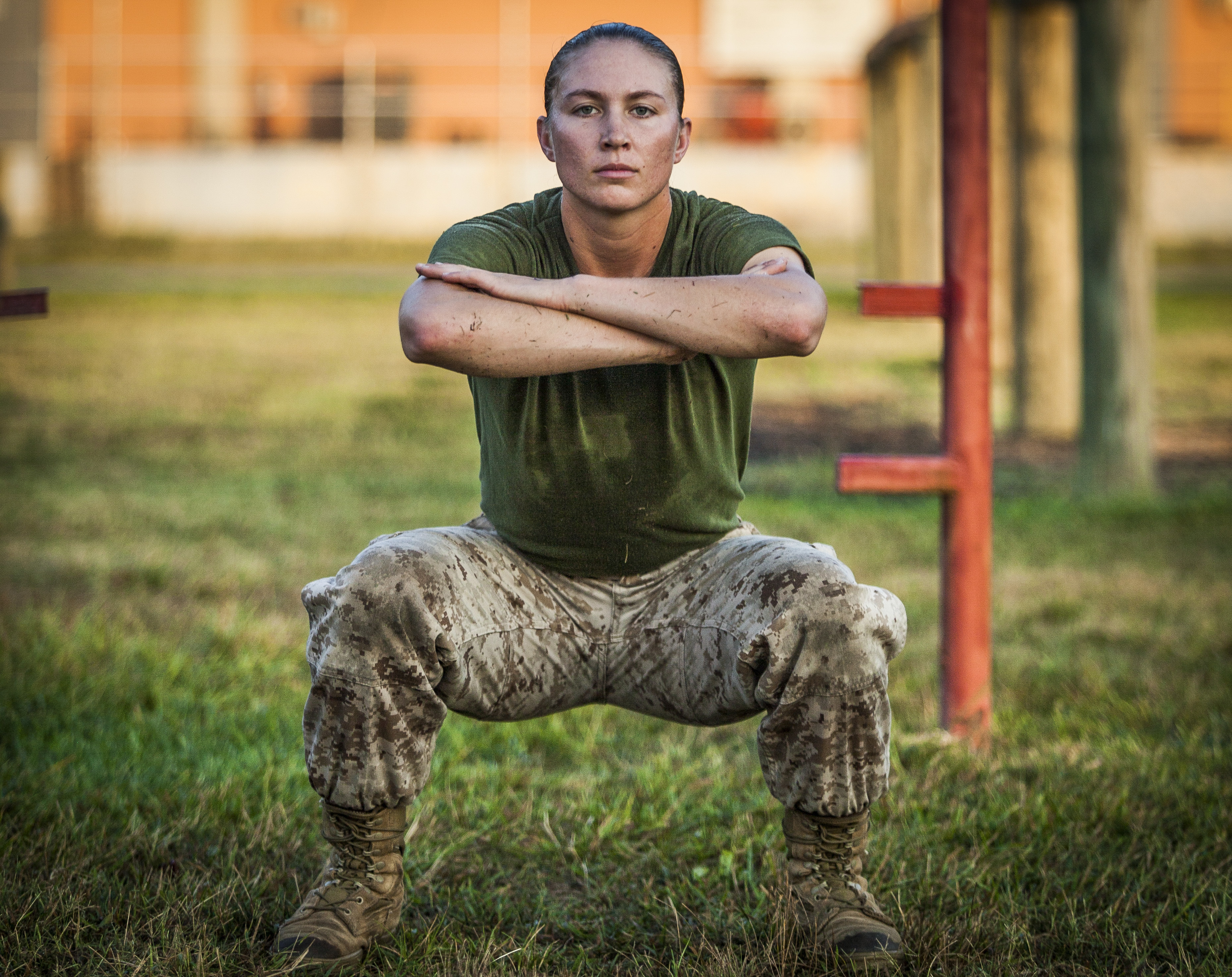
A U.S. Marine Corps officer candidate squatting as an exercise

In strength training, the squat is a full body exercise that trains primarily the muscles of the thighs, hips and buttocks, as well as strengthening the bones, ligaments and insertion of the tendons throughout the lower body. The pistol squat is a one legged squat.

=== Mālāsana or upavesasana in yoga ===
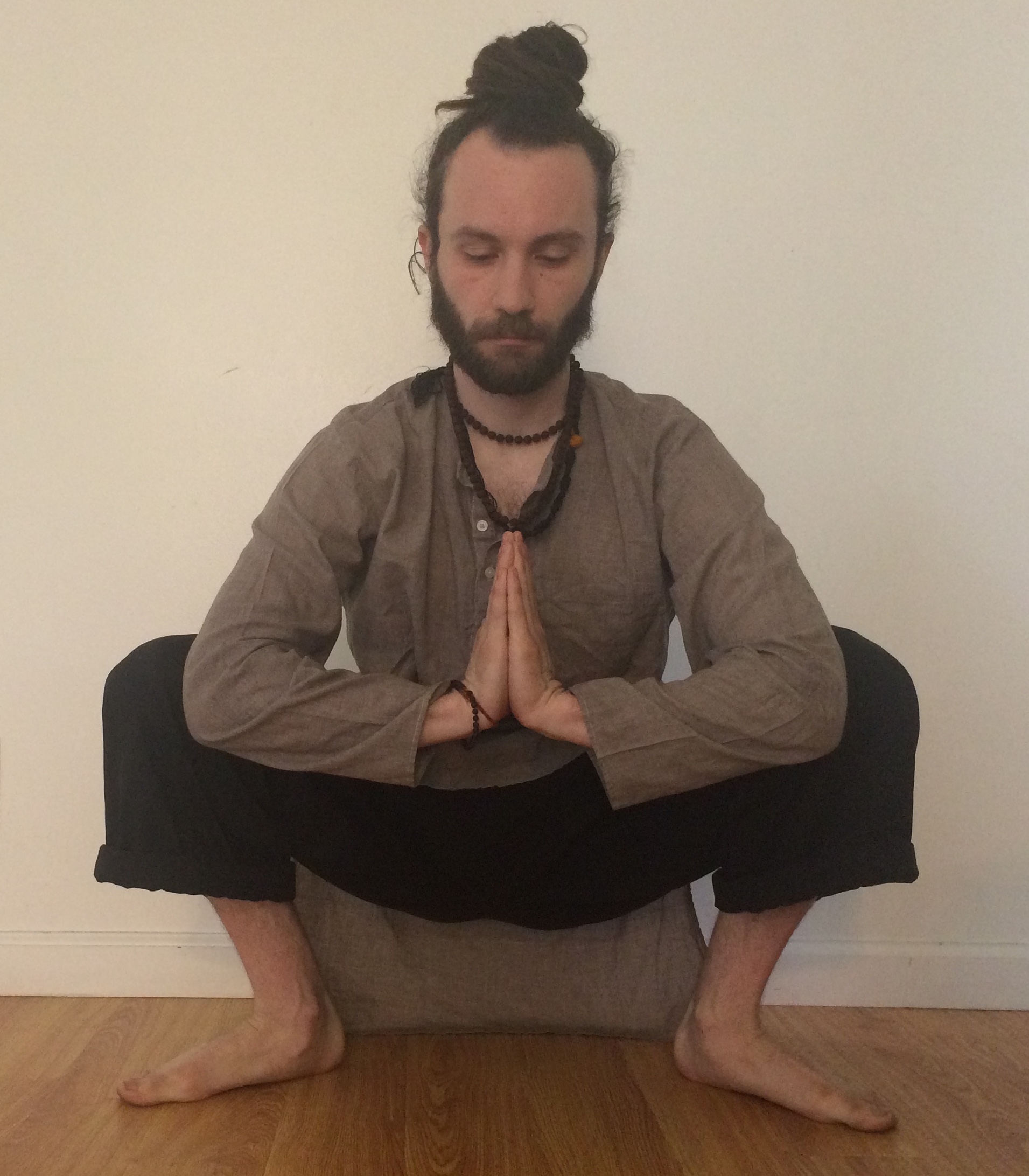
Mālāsana yoga pose

Upaveśāsana (literally "sitting down pose"), also known as Mālāsana meaning "garland pose", or simply the yoga squat, is an asana.

The āsana is a squat with heels flat on the floor and hip-width apart (or slightly wider if necessary), toes pointing out on a diagonal. The torso is brought forward between the thighs, elbows are braced against the inside of the knees, and the hands press together in front of the chest in Añjali Mudrā.

=== Tai Chi ===
In Taoist Tai Chi, the "Dan Yu" (spine stretching) exercise involves squatting. It is intended to work primarily the pelvic region, the legs and the lower back. Fifty or more repetitions may be performed in advanced classes. The feet are placed in a stance wider than the shoulders. When squatting the knees move in the direction of the feet.

== Urinating and defecating ==
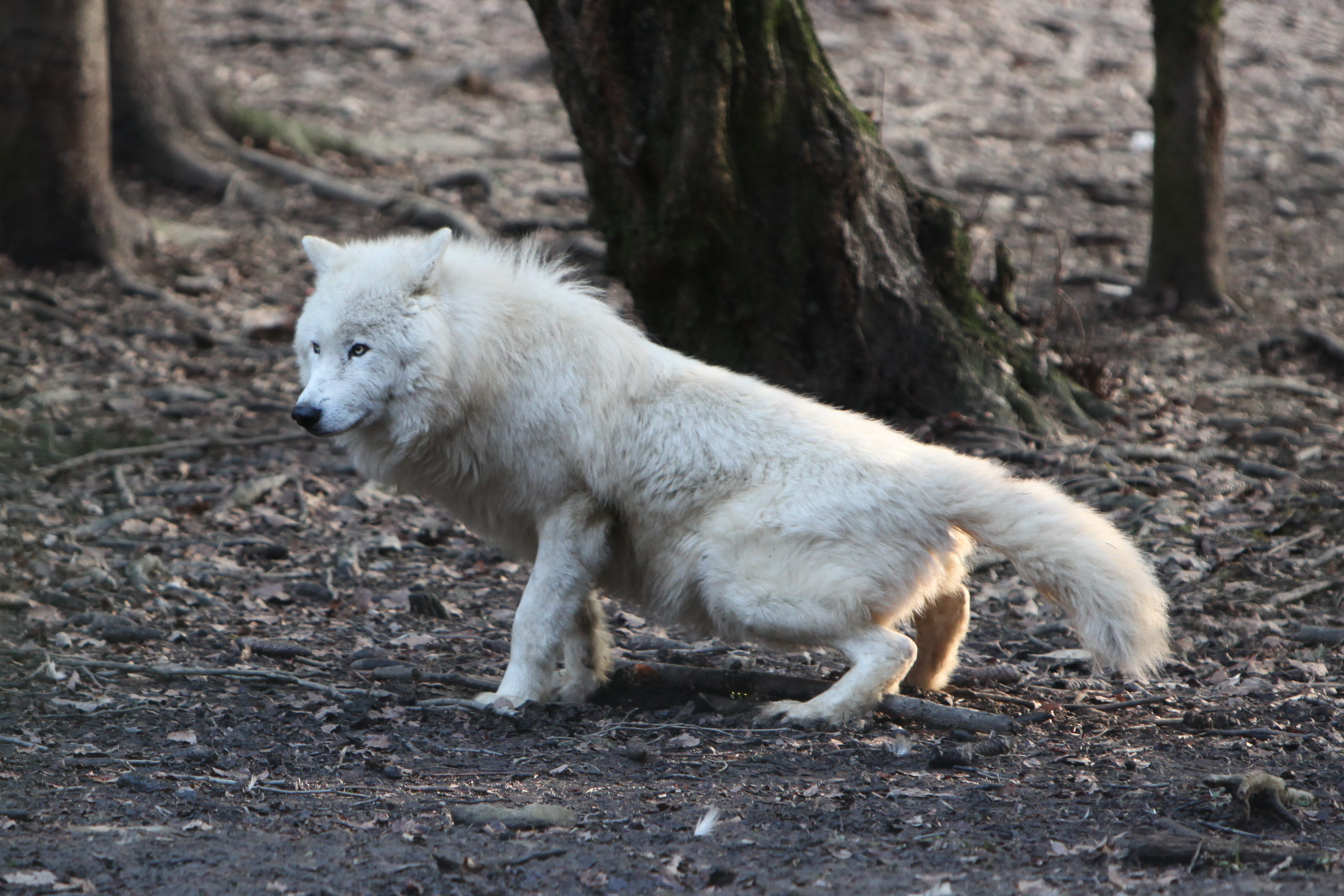
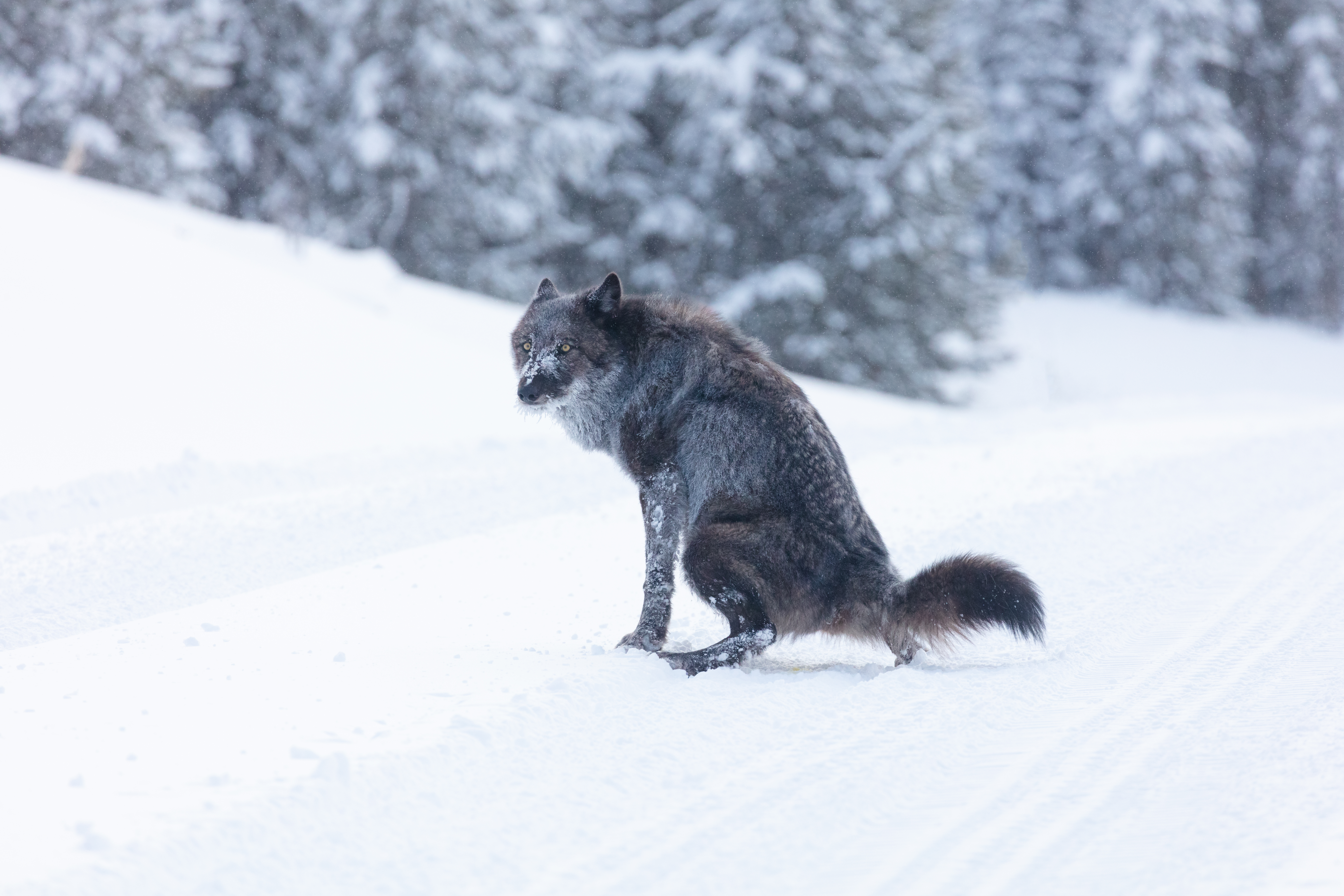
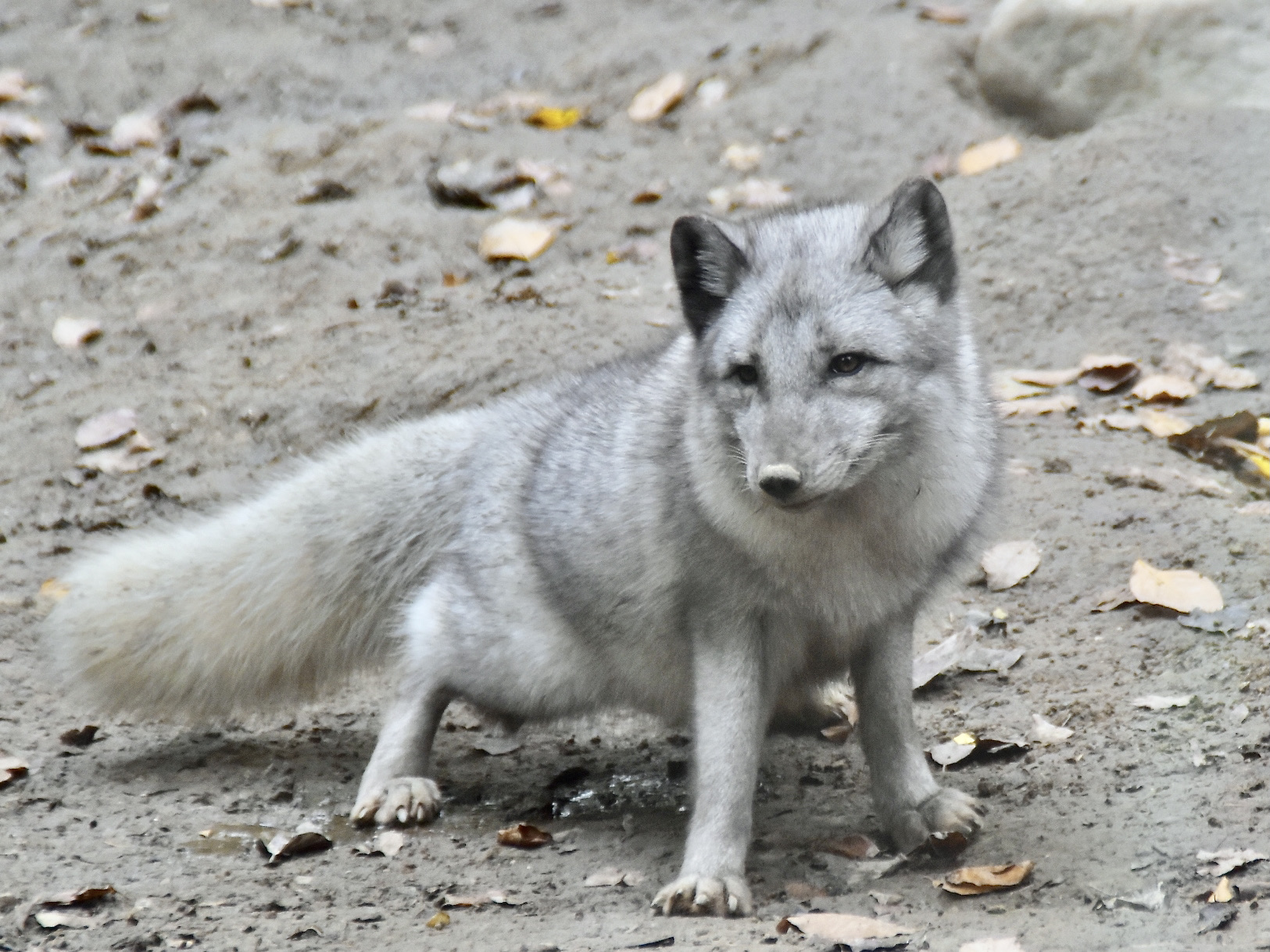
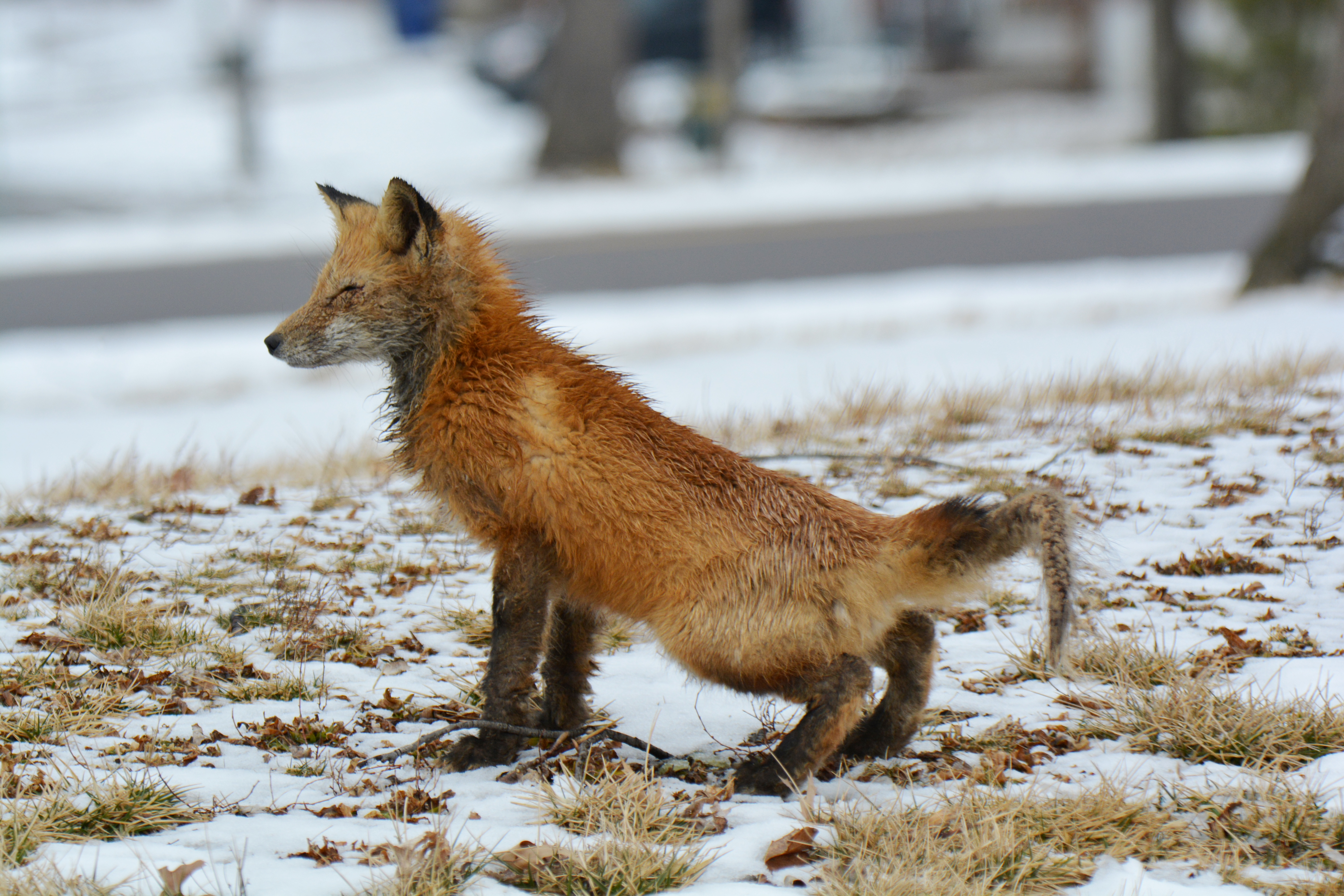
Wolves and foxes urinate in a squatting position.

The squatting defecation posture involves squatting by standing with the knees and hips sharply bent and the bare buttocks suspended near the ground. Squat toilets are designed to facilitate this posture and are common in various parts of the world.

A partial squatting position (or "hovering") while urinating is often done to avoid sitting on a potentially contaminated toilet seat, but it may leave urine behind in the bladder and it is not good for the pelvic floor muscles.

Canids often urinate in a squatting position, but usually raise their legs while scent marking.

== Health ==
In East Asian cultures such as Chinese, Japanese, Korean and Vietnamese, postures with high flexion including kneeling and squatting are used more often in daily activities, while in North America, people kneel or squat less frequently in daily activities, unless for occupational, religious, or leisure practices. The favored style of those high flexion postures also differs among ethnic groups. While Caucasians tend to flex the forefoot when kneeling or squatting, East Asians are more likely to keep the foot flat on the ground.

In the two common styles of kneeling, the plantarflexed kneel and the dorsiflexed kneel, the lead leg may experience higher adduction and flexion moment, which is associated with increased knee joint loads.

=== Risk of osteoarthritis ===
There is increased incidence of knee osteoarthritis among squatters who squat for hours a day for many years. There is evidence that sustained squatting may cause bilateral peroneal nerve palsy. A common name for this affliction is squatter's palsy although there may be reasons other than squatting for this to occur. For societies who rarely squat, squatting as a different posture may bring health benefits.

=== In patients with tetralogy of Fallot ===
Toddlers and older children with the congenital heart disease tetralogy of Fallot will often instinctively squat during a "tet spell" (an episode involving a sudden development of blue skin, caused by a drop of oxygen in the blood), allowing more blood to flow to the lungs. Squatting increases systemic vascular resistance and allows for a temporary reversal of the shunt. It increases pressure on the left side of the heart, decreasing the right to left shunt thus decreasing the amount of deoxygenated blood entering the systemic circulation.

=== Squatting facets ===
The existence of squatting facets on the distal tibia and talar articular surfaces of skeletons, which result from contact between the two bones during hyperdorsiflexion, have been used as markers to indicate if that person habitually squatted.

== Childbirth position ==
The squatting position gives a greater increase of pressure in the pelvic cavity with minimal muscular effort. The birth canal will open 20 to 30% more in a squat than in any other position. It is recommended for the second stage of childbirth.

In ancient Egypt, women delivered babies while squatting on a pair of bricks, known as birth bricks.

== Sexual position ==
There are versions of the "cowgirl" sex position where a woman is squatting over a man, who is lying on his back, instead of kneeling over him. These are referred to by different names such as Asian cowgirl, frog squat position, and froggystyle. The woman can face forwards or backwards (reverse).

== See also ==
- List of human positions – Physical configurations of the human body
- Outline of exercise – Exercise is physical activity that improves health
