= Defecation postures =

Squatting or sitting to defecate

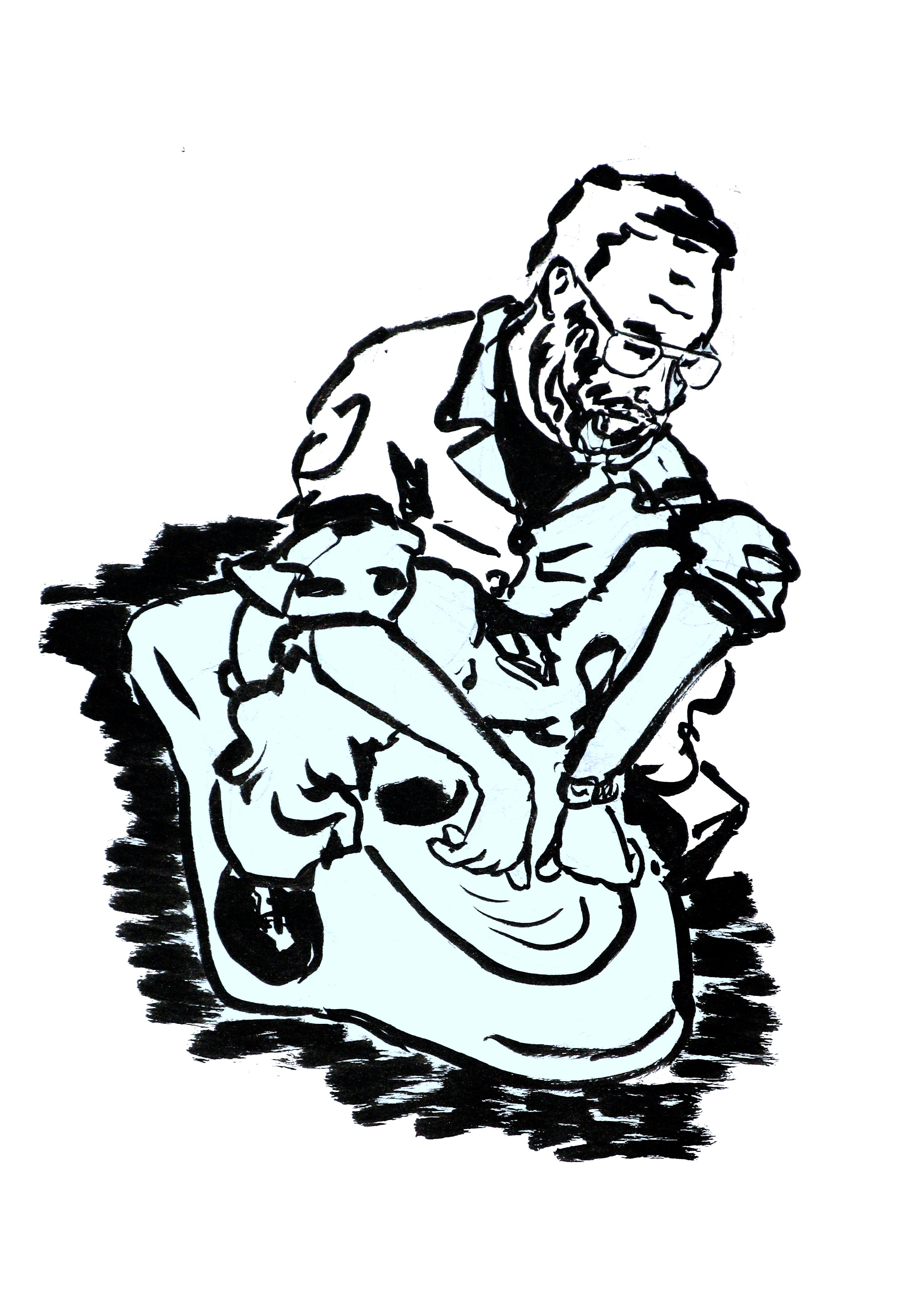
An illustration of a man squatting on the squat toilet.

Humans mostly use one of two types of defecation postures to defecate: squatting and sitting. People use the squatting postures when using squat toilets or when defecating in the open in the absence of toilets. The sitting posture on the other hand is used in toilets that have a pedestal or "throne", where users generally lean forward or sit at 90 degrees to a toilet seat.

== Sitting ==
An illustration of a man sitting on the toilet defecating.

The sitting defecation posture involves sitting with hips and knees at approximately right angles, as on a chair. So-called "Western-style" flush toilets and also many types of dry toilets are designed to be used in a sitting posture.

In Western countries, most people are accustomed to sitting toilets, although this fashion has only been present for around 100 years. Sitting toilets only came into widespread use in Europe in the nineteenth century.

Sitting toilets requires users to strain in an unnatural position. In the sitting position, the puborectalis muscle chokes the rectum, and the anorectal angle is unfavorable, at almost 90 degrees. This may lead to constipation symptoms such as incomplete evacuation of stool, irregular bowel movements, hard stools and the need for excessive straining. Compared to the more natural squatting position, western-style toilets may lead to health issues such as inflamed hemorrhoids.

== Squatting ==
The squatting defecation posture involves squatting, or crouching. It requires standing with knees and hips sharply bent and the buttocks close to the ground. Squat toilets are designed to facilitate this posture. Squatting is considered the natural, traditional and most common defecation posture in Asian and African countries. However, in some urban areas of India, people are gradually switching to western-style sitting toilets.

The Indian Society of Gastroenterology stated that, in the context of constipation, the squatting defecation posture is more physiological (i.e., natural), ideal and relaxed compared to the sitting posture. However, they found limited evidence of benefit. The squatting position also increases intraabdominal pressure. It is thought that the squatting posture allows for better relaxation of the puborectalis muscle and hence straightening of the anorectal angle, and for faster, easier and more complete evacuation of stool. The squatting position therefore prevents excessive straining, and hence protects stretching of the nerves, such as the pudendal nerve. Damage of these nerves can lead to permanent problems with urinary, defecation and sexual function.

Excessive straining in the squatting position while defecating may increase the risk of severe hemorrhoids, or increase the tendency of prolapse of hemorroids, because of increased perineal descent and intraabdominal pressure. Prolonged and repeated straining on a sitting toilet has the same effect.

== Assisted-squatting ==
People who are not used to squat toilets, and people who do not have the flexibility, strength, or balance needed to lower into, sustain, or rise from a squatting position without pain or assistance may not find it easy to use the squatting posture. This may include the elderly, people with disabilities, overweight people or people suffering from a skeletal or muscular disease.

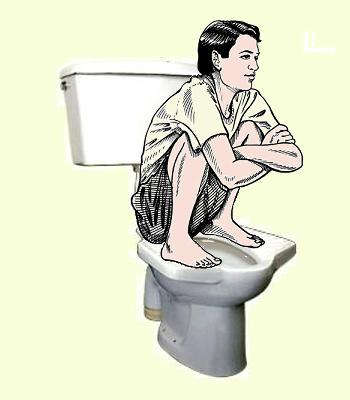
Squatting defecation posture on the toilet specially equipped for this

An assisted-squatting position can be achieved by placing a wrap-around foot stool or box under the feet while using a sitting toilet. This raises the legs and allows for some degree of widening of the anorectal angle. The anorectal angle can be further increased by leaning forwards in this semi-squatting position. Using a box to raise the legs has been recommended for various straining related medical conditions such as obstructed defecation syndrome, and solitary rectal ulcer syndrome.

For elderly people or people with mobility issues, this "assisted-squatting" position is closer to the more natural squatting position, and gives some of the benefit of the squatting position such as reduced need for straining. The semi squatting position is one of the practical solutions for avoiding constipation. Various "squat assist devices" are also commercially available.

== See also ==
- Defecography
- Human positions
