= Pedo-repair RNA motif =

Pedo-repair RNA
- Consensus secondary structure of Pedo-repair RNAs

Identifiers
- Symbol: Pedo-repair
- Rfam: RF01715

Other data
- RNA type: Cis-regulatory element
- Domain: Pedobacter sp. BAL39
- PDB structures: PDBe

The Pedo-repair RNA motif is a conserved RNA structure identified by using bioinformatics. It has been detected in only one species of bacteria: Pedobacter sp. BAL39, within the phylum Bacteroidota. The motif might be in the 5′ untranslated regions of operons containing genes predicted to be involved in DNA repair or related to restriction enzymes.
