= Pedo (name) =

Pedo is a given name and surname. Notable people with the name include:

- Pedo Terlaje (1946–2023), politician in Guam
- Albinovanus Pedo, 1st century Roman poet
- Gaius Popilius Carus Pedo, 2nd century Roman senator
- Marcus Pedo Vergilianus, 2nd century Roman senator
