= Public employment services in the European Union =

Public Employment Services (PES) are services or authorities responsible for connecting jobseekers to the potential employers. Through the use of information, demand of labor market, and placement, PES authorities try to prevent unemployment within the public sector (concerning jobs within the government agency). In the European Union, the idea of establishing these services was imposed by the European Council and European Parliament in order to improve the matter of unemployment in this geographical sector. The official name of this authority is The European Network of Public Employment Services. Its responsibilities include:

1. Comparing the PES performance between the European countries through the process of benchmarking,
2. Finding the best practices and mutually learning from one another, more of which can be found in the PES Knowledge Center,
3. Learning about the effect of modernization and improving the PES services delivery, including the Youth Guarantee (a commitment by all Member States to make sure that all young people under the age of 25 have a good quality to continued education, employment, apprenticeship and traineeship), and lastly,
4. Preparing the inputs to European Employment Strategy and the correlating policies regarding labor market.

A Board is responsible for governing this network, in which each of the Member States and Commission are represented by two members. The meetings of the Board take place twice a year in order to promote strategic discussions and make decisions regarding the further activities of the Network.

== Challenges of Public Employment Services in Europe ==
Some of the challenges that the labor market experiences in relation to public employment services include demographic factors, globalization, technological changes, labor market challenge, or a rising income inequality.

=== Demographic ===
Demographic factors show that population trends will have a severe impact on the labor market. Over the next 30 years, the European Union will encounter with the problem of population aging. In various European countries, the working population in the economies are already suffering from lack of skills in different occupations and sectors in the economy. The Public Employment Services are responsible for engaging the inactive people and focus on improving employability according to the challenges that these particular people face in different ages.

=== Globalization ===
Globalization leads labor market to constantly evolving as a result of increasing use of mobile technologies and connections via Internet. Business try to increase their value through the restructuring processes while placing value of business innovations and upskilling of their labor in order to withstand the competition. Therefore, globalization stretches the importance of reemployment and upskilling of the workers who had been redundant due to restructuring processes. Public Employment Services in EU are therefore requiring improving the employability of people, support job-to-job transition and support the restructuring process of employers.

=== Technology ===
Technology has been constantly evolving, causing the labor market to shift as well. Specifically, the shift from primary and manufacturing sectors towards more knowledge-based services and activities. This means that technology makes progress and greater productivity improvements, including the use of machinery, or turning manual tasks into automated. And as it does, the global trends lean towards less employment in manufacturing sectors. Even though a shift towards knowledge-based services allows for opportunities, there is a risk of those opportunities to be taken unequally to the employees. Therefore, public employment services are required to serve as an instrument to offer better opportunities to the disadvantaged ones by providing skills and knowledge to help withstand the technological progress.

=== Labor Market Skill Mismatch ===
Countries incapability to adapt workers’ skills to the certain unmet demand for labor, limits them to excel in the economy. While under-qualification is an issue mostly in the low-income countries, the advanced and developed countries, including most of the European Union member states, struggle with an ample number of workers who are actually over-qualified. This brings another task for public employment services to collaborate with labor market stakeholders in order to improve and eventually develop the skills of the labor force to meet the demands.

=== Rising Income Inequality ===
The increasing gap between rich and poor in European countries sets another challenge for the labor market. Research shows that a quarter of developed countries had become the richest 10 percent of the population in 2011. Public Employment Services can be used as an instrument to confront the income inequality and make it smaller, since a reason for such inequality may be attributed to long-term stagnation of growth in developed countries and low incidence of growth bursts in the developing countries.

== The “Start and Improve Your Business” Program ==
In connection with International Labor Organization, the Public Employment Services around the world are cooperating on a new program called Start and Improve Your Business. This program is a management-related training programme which focuses on starting and enhancing the quality of small businesses, promoting this as a strategy to provide men and women around the world with employment. SIYB is currently translated into 40 languages and functions in more than 100 countries, including the European member states. This program aims has been able to train 15 million people and had resulted in at least 2.65 million new businesses worldwide, helping mostly developing economies, but also focusing on European countries.

== EU Network of Public Employment Services: Strategy 2020 ==
Due to challenges which are imposed by frictional unemployment and structural unemployment, European Public Employment Services are required to adapt their services. The document of EU Network of 2020 Strategy represents the common strategy to be promoted by the PES Network and build off of previous amendments. It sets direction of the future arrangements and changes relating to the unemployment issue. According to the decision of the European Council and the European Parliament made in May 2014, the formal legal entity has been given to the former network of Heads of Public Employment Services (HoPES). The mission of the PES Network is as follows: “to be the vehicle for enhanced European PES cooperation enabling them to deliver their role as labor market conductors, contributing to European employment strategies, improving labor market function, integration and creating better balanced labor markets”. Its goals which are designed to promote modernization of the public employment services, include:

- Boosting the labor demand and promote voluntary employment
- Increase of the capacity of job offers to improve labor market function
- Anticipating the demand by using labor market information, and
- Prepare the labor force for the active labor market participation

The latest update from the European Commission suggests that the duration of the EU Decision for establishing the Network of Public Employment Services has extended until 2027.

== Conclusion ==
Public Employment Services should be evidence-based, flexible and employment focused organizations. The objectives of these authorities in European Union are primarily their engagements with customers. They need to promote continual employment focus, account for the labor market knowledge and skills needed to withstand the pressure of this market. European PES/authorities share the values of respect, social responsibility, honesty and engagement as a part of the European Network. In order to put the requirements into long-term practice, these authorities will need to align the demand of both firms as well as the potential employees.
