= Pedestrian (disambiguation) =

A pedestrian is a person travelling on foot along a road or in a developed area.

Pedestrian or The Pedestrian may also refer to:

- Pedestrian, a practitioner of pedestrianism, a 19th-century form of competitive walking
- "The Pedestrian", a short story by author Ray Bradbury
- Pedestrian (band), an alternative rock band based in Los Angeles
- Pedestrian (company), a company and website, owned by The Pedestrian Group
- The Pedestrian (film), a 1973 film directed by Maximilian Schell
- Pedestrian (rapper), a rapper and co-founder of Anticon
- The Pedestrian (video game), a video game
