= Poly(ethylene succinate) =

Identifiers
CAS Number	25569-53-3
ChemSpider	none
CompTox Dashboard (EPA)	DTXSID60948459

Properties
Chemical formula	(C_{6}H_{8}O_{4})_{n}
Melting point	103–106 °C (217–223 °F; 376–379 K)
- Except where otherwise noted, data are given for materials in their standard state (at 25 °C [77 °F], 100 kPa). Infobox references

Poly(ethylene succinate) (PES) is an aliphatic synthetic polyester with a melting point from 103–106 °C. It is synthesized from dicarboxylic acids; either by ring-opening polymerization of succinic anhydride with ethylene oxide or by polycondensation of succinic acid and ethylene glycol. Thermophilic Bacillus sp. TT96 is found in soil and can degrade PES. Mesophilic PES degrading microorganisms were found in the Bacillus and Paenibacillus species; strain KT102; a relative of Bacillus pumilus was the most capable of degrading PES film. The fungal species NKCM1003 a type of Aspergillus clavatus also degrades PES film. The solubility of lithium salts (e.g. lithium perchlorate, LiClO_{4}) in PES made it a good alternative to poly(ethylene oxide) (PEO) during early development of solid polymer electrolytes for lithium ion batteries.
