= Pes (rural locality) =

Pes (Russian: Песь) is the name of several rural localities in Pesskoye Settlement of Khvoyninsky District in Novgorod Oblast, Russia.

- Pes (selo), a selo
- Pes (village), a village
