= (S)-1-phenylethanol dehydrogenase =

Class of enzymes

Identifiers
- EC no.: 1.1.1.311

Databases
- IntEnz: IntEnz view
- BRENDA: BRENDA entry
- ExPASy: NiceZyme view
- KEGG: KEGG entry
- MetaCyc: metabolic pathway
- PRIAM: profile
- PDB structures: RCSB PDB PDBe PDBsum
Search
- PMC: articles
- PubMed: articles
- NCBI: proteins

(S)-1-phenylethanol dehydrogenase (EC 1.1.1.311, PED) is an enzyme with systematic name (S)-1-phenylethanol:NAD^{+} oxidoreductase. This enzyme catalyses the following chemical reaction:

(S)-1-phenylethanol
+ NAD^{+}
H^{+}
H^{+}
acetophenone
+ NADH

The enzyme is involved in degradation of ethylbenzene.
