= Squat toilet =

Toilet used by squatting

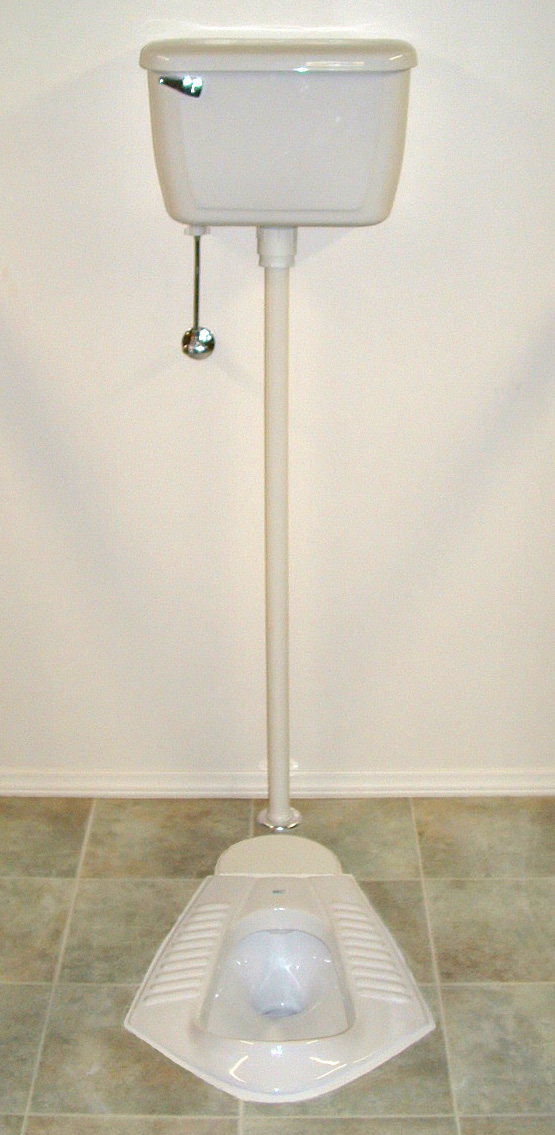
Squat toilet (flush toilet) with water cistern for flushing (Cape Town, South Africa)

A squat toilet (or squatting toilet) is a toilet used by squatting, rather than sitting. This means that the posture for defecation and urination is to place one foot on each side of the toilet drain or hole and to squat over it. There are several types of squat toilets, but they all consist essentially of a toilet pan or bowl at floor level. Such a toilet pan is also called a "squatting pan". A squat toilet may use a water seal and therefore be a flush toilet, or it can be without a water seal and therefore be a dry toilet. The term "squat" refers only to the expected defecation posture and not any other aspects of toilet technology, such as whether it is water flushed or not.

Squat toilets are used all over the world, but are particularly common in some Asian and African nations, as well as in some Muslim countries. In many of those countries, anal cleansing with water is also the cultural norm and easier to perform than with toilets used in a sitting position. They are also occasionally found in some European and South American countries.

Squat toilets are regarded as traditional by many. In 1976, squatting toilets were said to be used by the majority of the world's population. However, there is a general trend in many countries to move from squatting toilets to sitting toilets (particularly in urban areas), as the latter are often regarded as more modern.

== Design ==
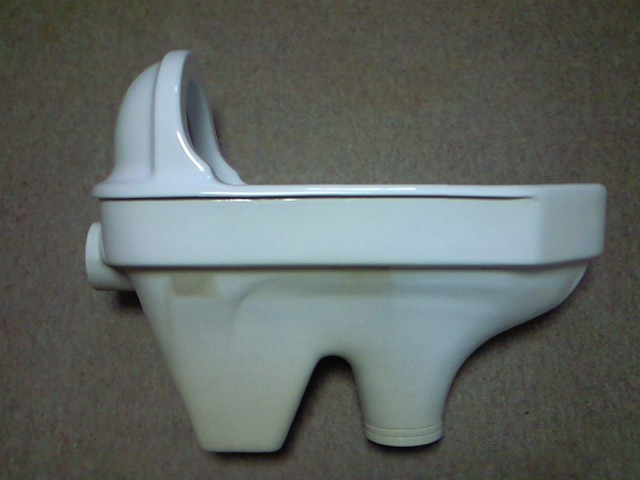
Side view of a ceramic squat toilet in Japan before installation

Squat toilets are arranged at floor level, which requires the individual to squat with bent knees. In contrast to a pedestal or a sitting toilet, the opening of the drain pipe is located at the ground level.

Squatting slabs can be made of porcelain (ceramic), stainless steel, fibreglass, or in the case of low-cost versions in developing countries, with concrete, ferrocement, plastic, or wood covered with linoleum. Slabs can also be made of wood (timber), but need to be treated with preservatives, such as paint or linoleum, to prevent rotting and to enable thorough cleaning of the squatting slab.

There are two design variations: one where the toilet is level with the ground, and the other where it is raised on a platform approximately 30 cm (1 ft). The latter is easier to use for people who urinate while standing, but both types can be used for this purpose. There is also no difference for defecation or squatting urination.

== Use ==
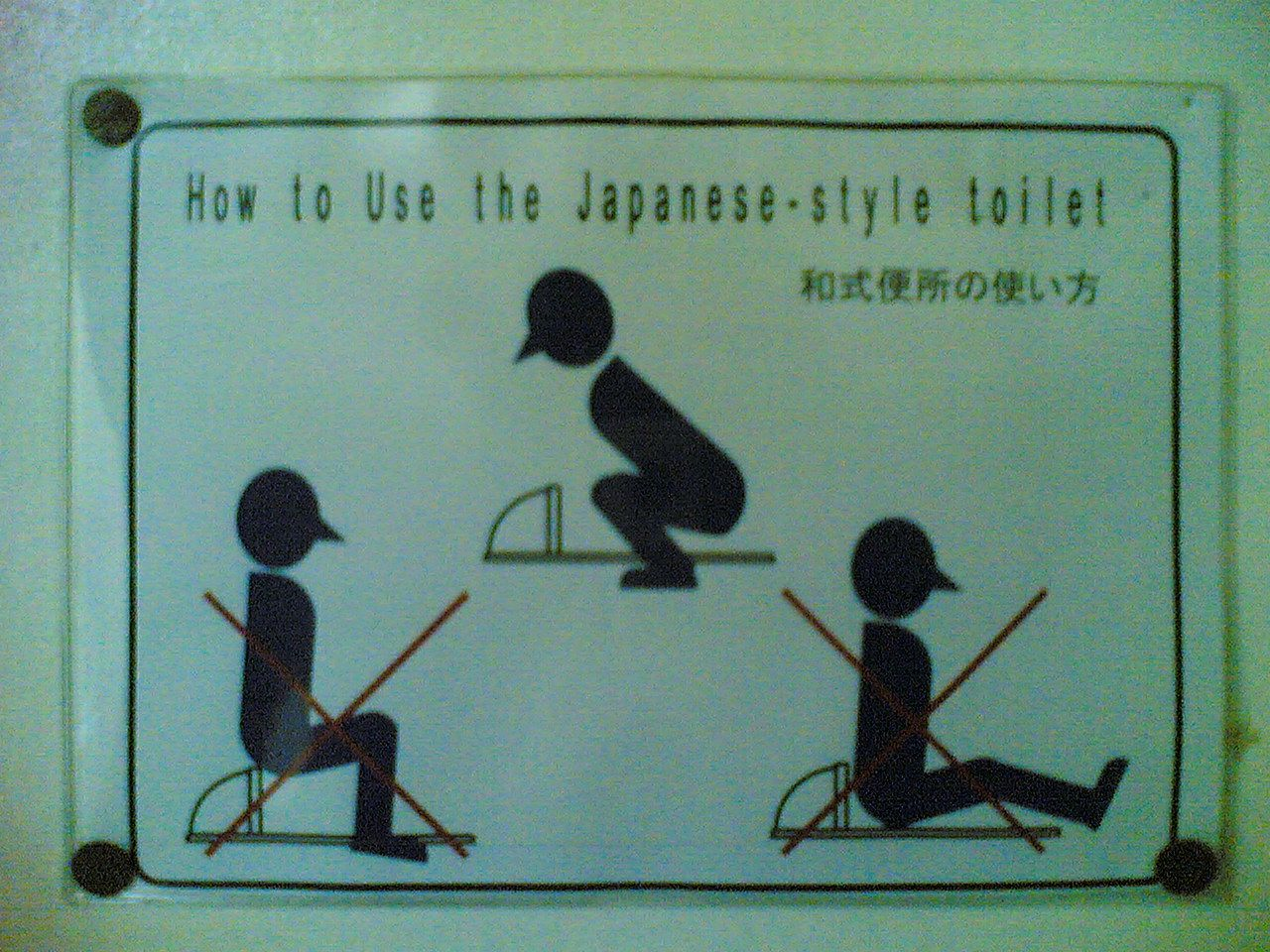
How to use a squat toilet correctly (sign in a toilet cubicle in Japan)

The user stands over the squat toilet facing the hood and pulls down (up in the case of skirts or dress) their trousers and underwear to the knees. The user then squats over the hole, as close to the front as possible, as excrement tends to fall onto the rear edge of the in-floor receptacle if the user squats too far back.

== Health, hygiene and maintenance ==
The standing surface of the squatting pan should be kept clean and dry in order to prevent disease transmission and to limit odors.

Squat toilets are usually easier to clean than sitting toilets (pedestals), except that one has to bend down further if the squatting pan needs manual scrubbing. Squat toilets are properly cleaned using a mop in combination with a detergent solution.

=== Health effects ===
The squatting defecation posture is more physiological, ideal, and relaxed. This is because it allows for better relaxation of the puborectalis muscle and hence straightening of the anorectal angle, and for faster, easier, and more complete evacuation of stool. The squatting position therefore prevents excessive straining, and hence protects against stretching of the nerves, such as the pudendal nerve. Damage to these nerves can lead to permanent problems with urinary, defecation, and sexual functions. The squatting position also increases intra-abdominal pressure. The squatting position is often recommended as part of a range of measures to manage constipation and its sub-types, including obstructed defecation syndrome, and dyssynergic defecation. Chronic, excessive straining during defecation, which is more likely to be needed in the sitting position, may be associated with the development of inflamed hemorrhoids, or any of the spectrum of pelvic organ prolapse disorders, such as rectocele, and rectal prolapse.

It also aids in emptying the urinary bladder entirely as the gravity reduces the stress on the pelvic floor muscles which is a natural posture for urinating from centuries before the toilet concepts were introduced. This prevents various complications like UTI.

However, according to some sources, excessive straining in the squatting position while defecating may increase the risk of severe hemorrhoids, or increase the tendency of prolapse of hemorrhoids, because of increased perineal descent and intra-abdominal pressure. Prolonged and repeated straining on a sitting toilet has the same effect.

== Society and culture ==
=== Perceptions and trends ===
There are two different attitudes towards squat toilets, largely dependent on what users are used to, or whether the toilet is at a public or private place: Some people regard squat toilets as more hygienic compared to sitting toilets. They might be easier to clean and there is no skin contact with the surface of the toilet seat. For that reason, some people perceive them as more hygienic, particularly for public toilets. However, this is a misconception due to the nature of how harmful microbes spread. The absence of a closed system of delivering waste inevitably leads to an aerosolized "spray" of harmful microbes and waste that can spread disease over a wider area far easier than the traditional use of a seated toilet can. This poses a far greater risk than the relatively low risk of contamination from skin contact with the seat of a sitting toilet.

Some people regard sitting toilets as "more modern" than squat toilets. Sitting toilets have a lower risk of soiling clothing or shoes, as urine is less likely to splash on bottom parts of trousers or shoes. Furthermore, sitting toilets are more convenient for people with disabilities and the elderly.

A trend towards more sitting toilets in countries that were traditionally using squat toilets can be observed in some urban and more affluent areas, in areas with new buildings (as well as hotels and airports) or in tourist regions.

=== Public toilets ===
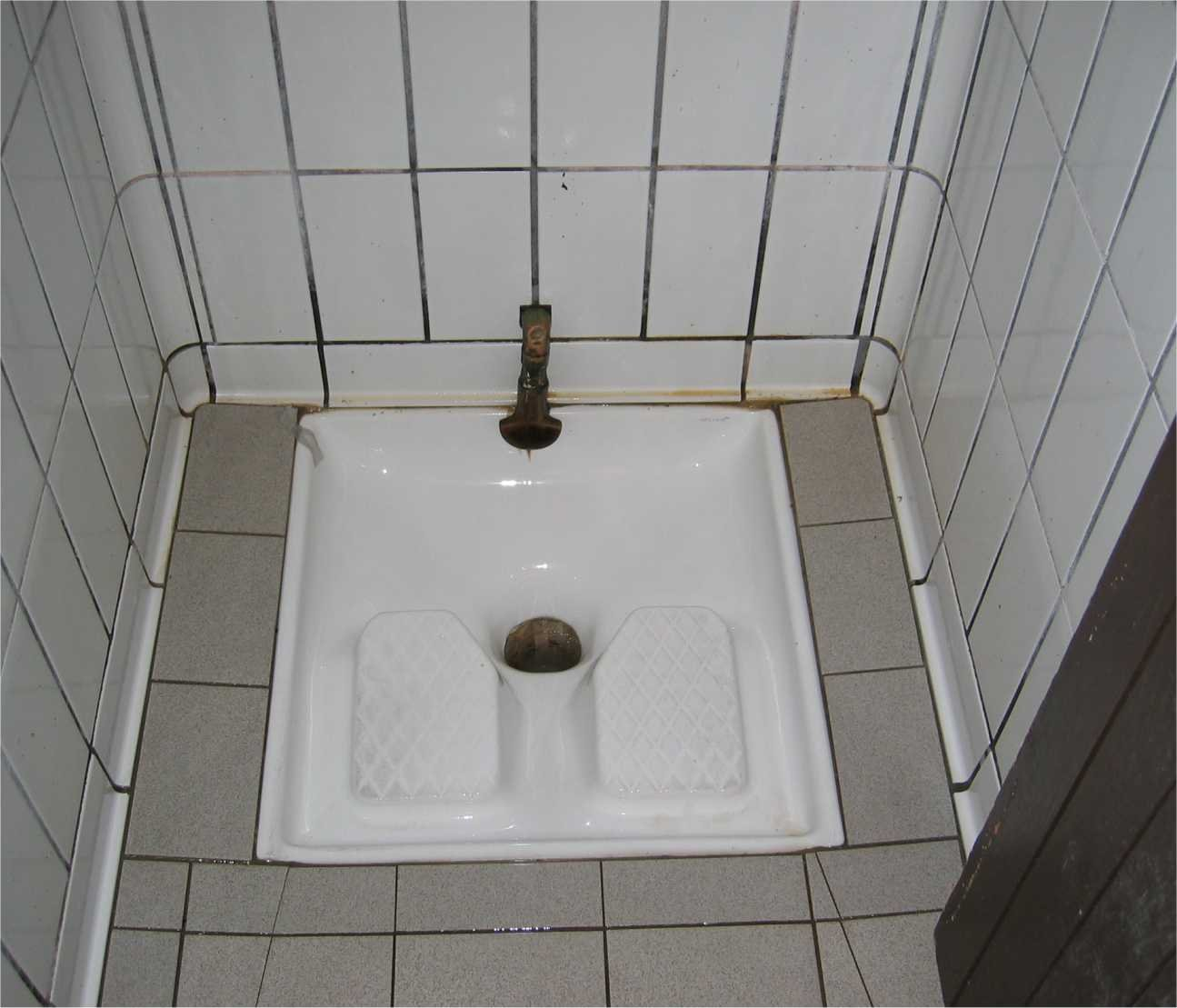
Squat toilet at a motorway service station near Toulouse, France. In areas of Europe where squat toilets are used, they are usually public toilets

Squat toilets are used in public toilets, rather than household toilets, because they are perceived by some as easier to clean and more hygienic, therefore potentially more appropriate for general public use. For instance, this is the case in parts of France, Italy, Greece, or the Balkans, where such toilets are somewhat common in public toilets (restrooms).

=== Preferences by country or region ===
The following general statements can be made:

- Squat toilets are common in many Asian countries, including China and India. They are also widespread in Turkey (alaturka tuvalet), Nepal, Indonesia, Bangladesh, Pakistan, Sri Lanka, Malaysia, Myanmar, Iran, and Iraq. They can be found in nations like Japan, South Korea, Thailand, and Singapore.
- People in sub-Saharan African countries, especially in rural areas, widely use squat toilets, for example in Kenya, Rwanda, Somalia, Tanzania, and Uganda. Squat toilets are not common in South Africa.
- Much of the world's population use squat toilets, especially in rural areas of developing countries.
- Countries in the Middle East and North Africa often have both types of toilets, i.e. sitting and squatting.
- In Hindu or Muslim cultures, the prevalence of squat toilets is generally quite high, as is the practice of anal cleansing with water.
- In Latin and South America, flush toilets are always of the sitting type, whereas dry toilets may be either of the sitting or a squatting type. The occurrence of squat toilets in urban areas of Latin America appears to be rather low.
- Squat toilets are rare in Australia, New Zealand, United States, Canada, and countries in Northern and Western Europe (except public toilets in France). Where they do exist, they have usually been installed to accommodate visitors, tourists, students, or recent migrants from places that use squatting toilets traditionally.

==== Europe ====
In Southern and Eastern Europe including parts of France, in Turkey, Greece, Italy, the Balkans, and Russia they are common, especially in public toilets. Squat pit latrine toilets are still present in many areas of Russia.

Squat toilets are generally non-existent in Northern and Western Europe. France and Italy are an exception and have some squat toilets remaining in old buildings and public toilets because they used to be the norm there in the early 20th century.

==== China ====
Many areas in China have traditional squat toilets instead of sitting toilets, especially in public toilets. Nevertheless, sitting toilets have increasingly become the norm in major urban areas and cities. While sitting toilets are associated with development and modernization, some associate them to reduced hygiene and possible transmission of diseases.

==== Japan ====
Although in Japan it is believed that the squat toilet is traditional, the trend in Japan is to move away from squat toilets: According to Toto, one of Japan's major toilet manufacturers, the production of Western-style toilets increased rapidly since 1976. In 2015, only 1% of all toilets produced by this company were squat toilets.

Since the 1960s, the trend has been to replace squat toilets at schools and public places with sitting toilets. This trend was thought to accelerate in the run-up to the 2020 Summer Olympics in Tokyo.

Since the 1980s, high-tech sitting toilets are emerging that replace traditional squat toilets, especially in urban areas. However, many rural people have no experience with such high-tech toilets and need detailed instructions. High-tech sitting toilets have also become commonplace in South Korea.

== Gallery ==
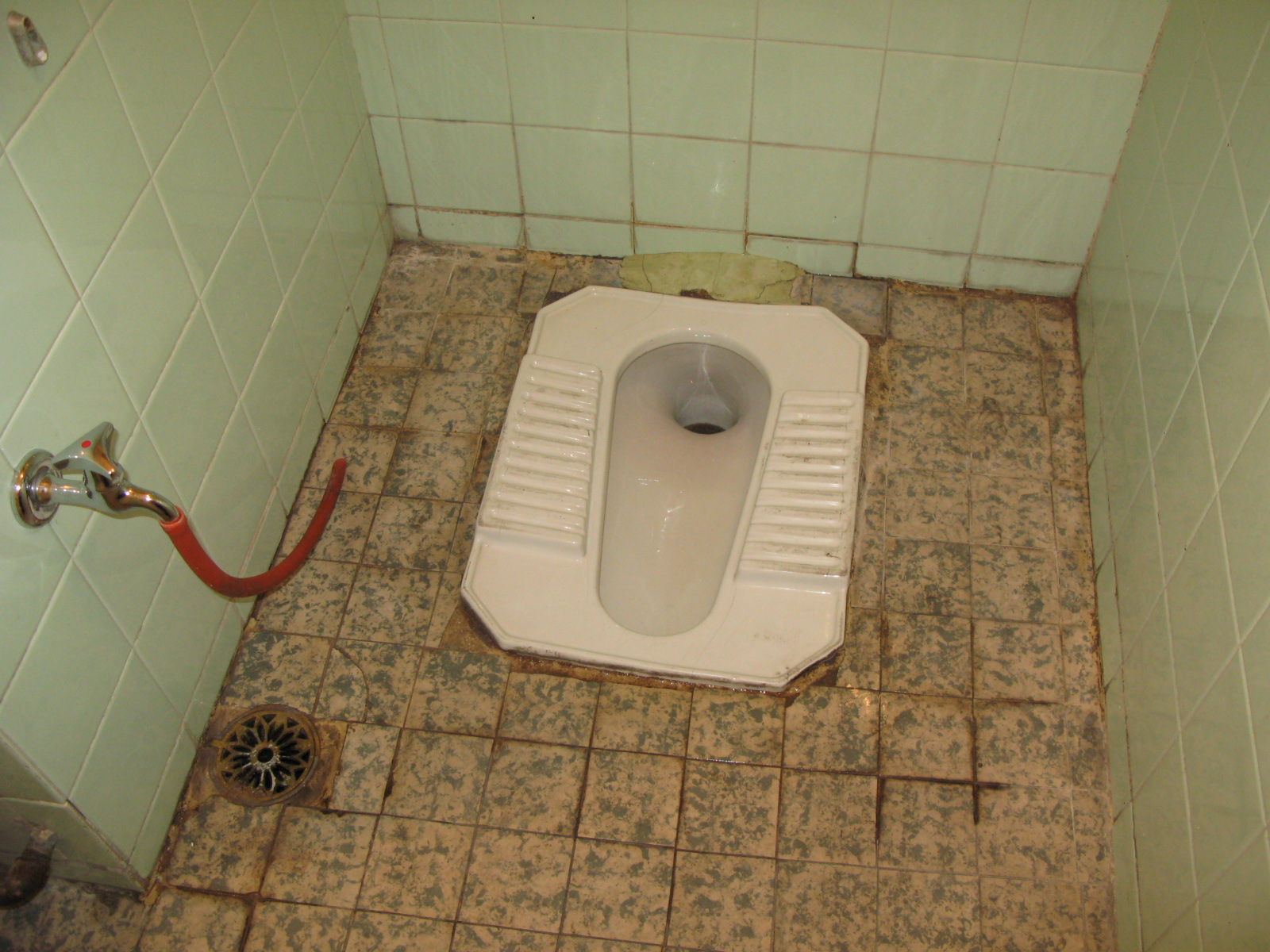
Typical toilet in urban Syria: Flush toilet squatting pan with hose on the left for anal cleansing.

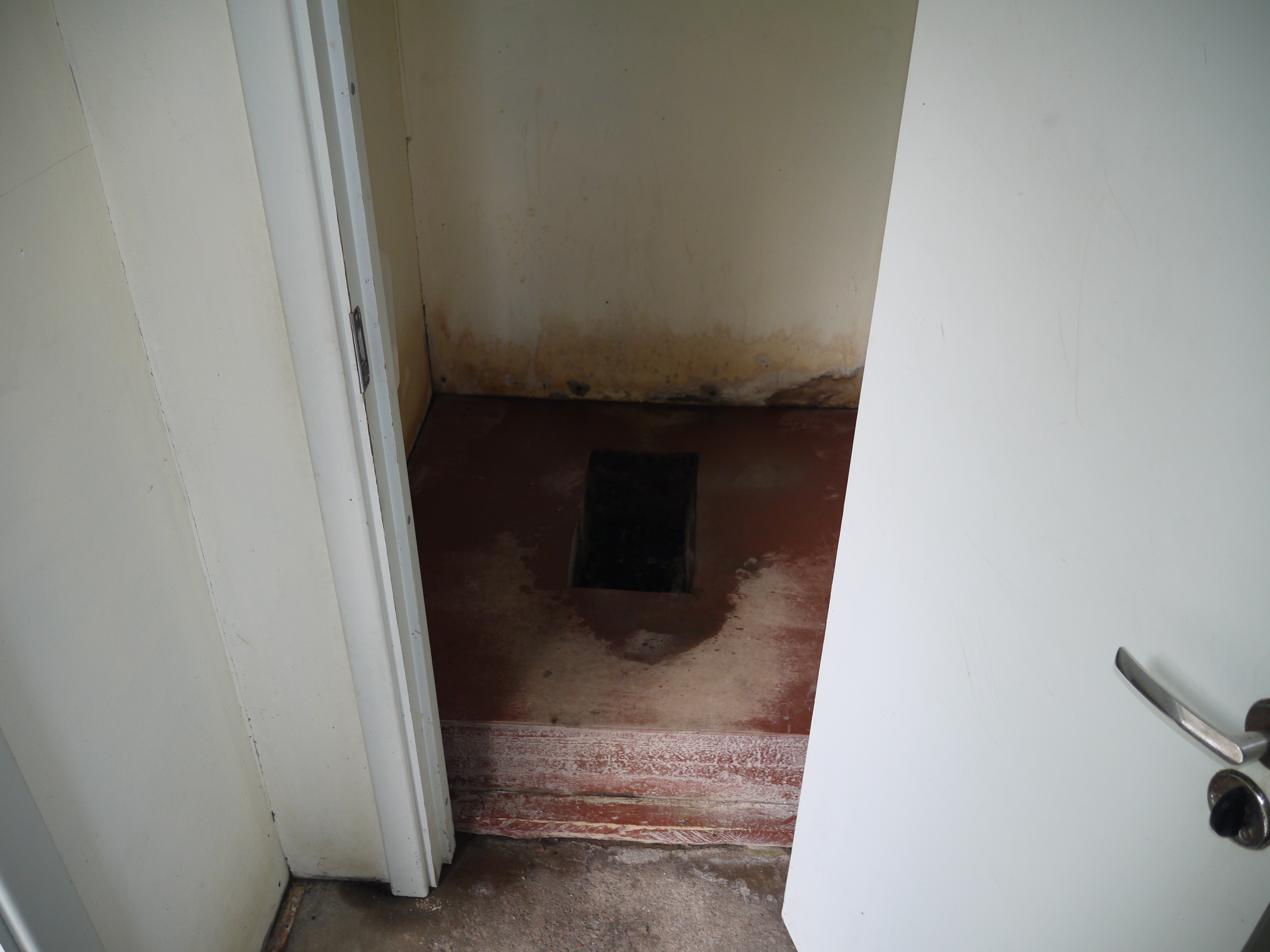
Squat toilet in Tsarskoye Selo, Russia

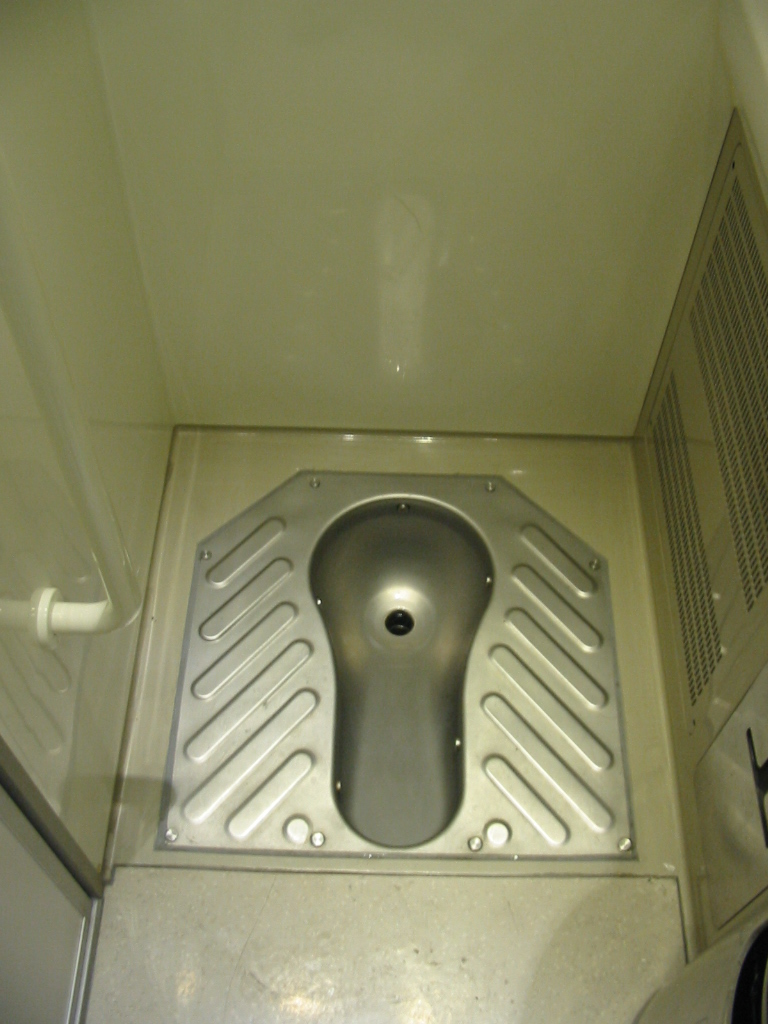
Squat toilet in a CRH1A trainset on the Guangshen Line in China

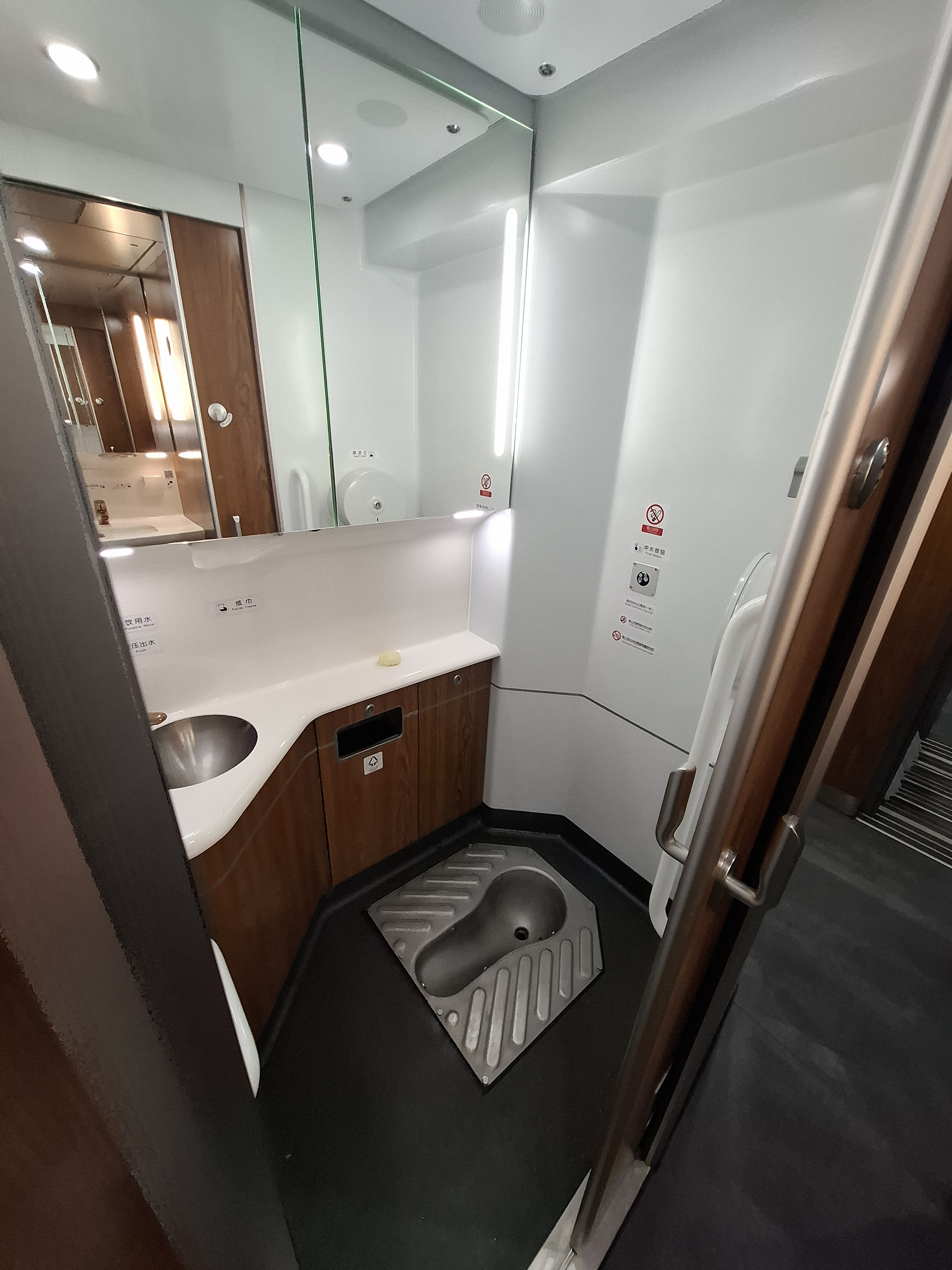
Squat toilet in Chinese High Speed train (G3551)

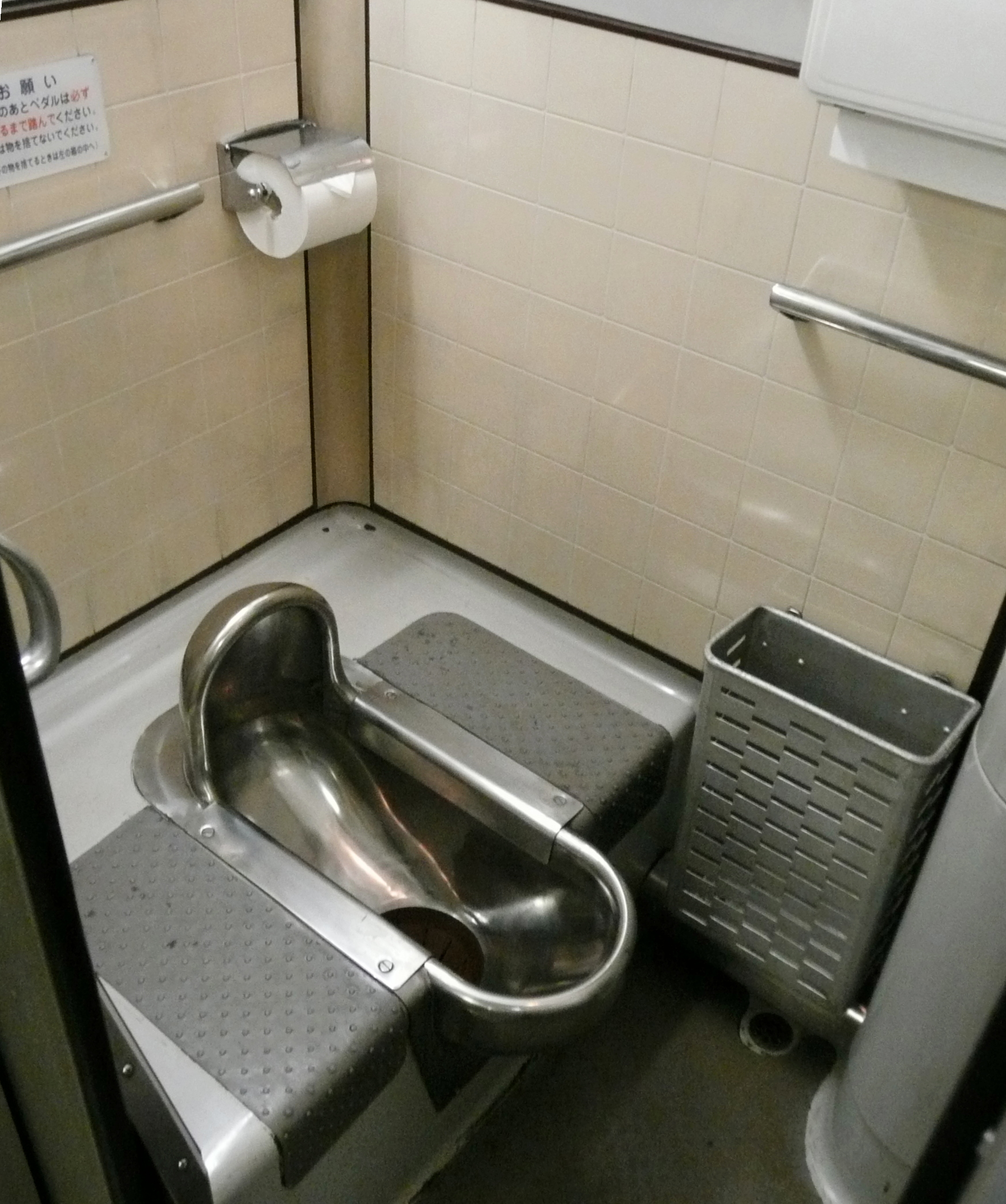
Squat toilet aboard a Japanese Ginga train

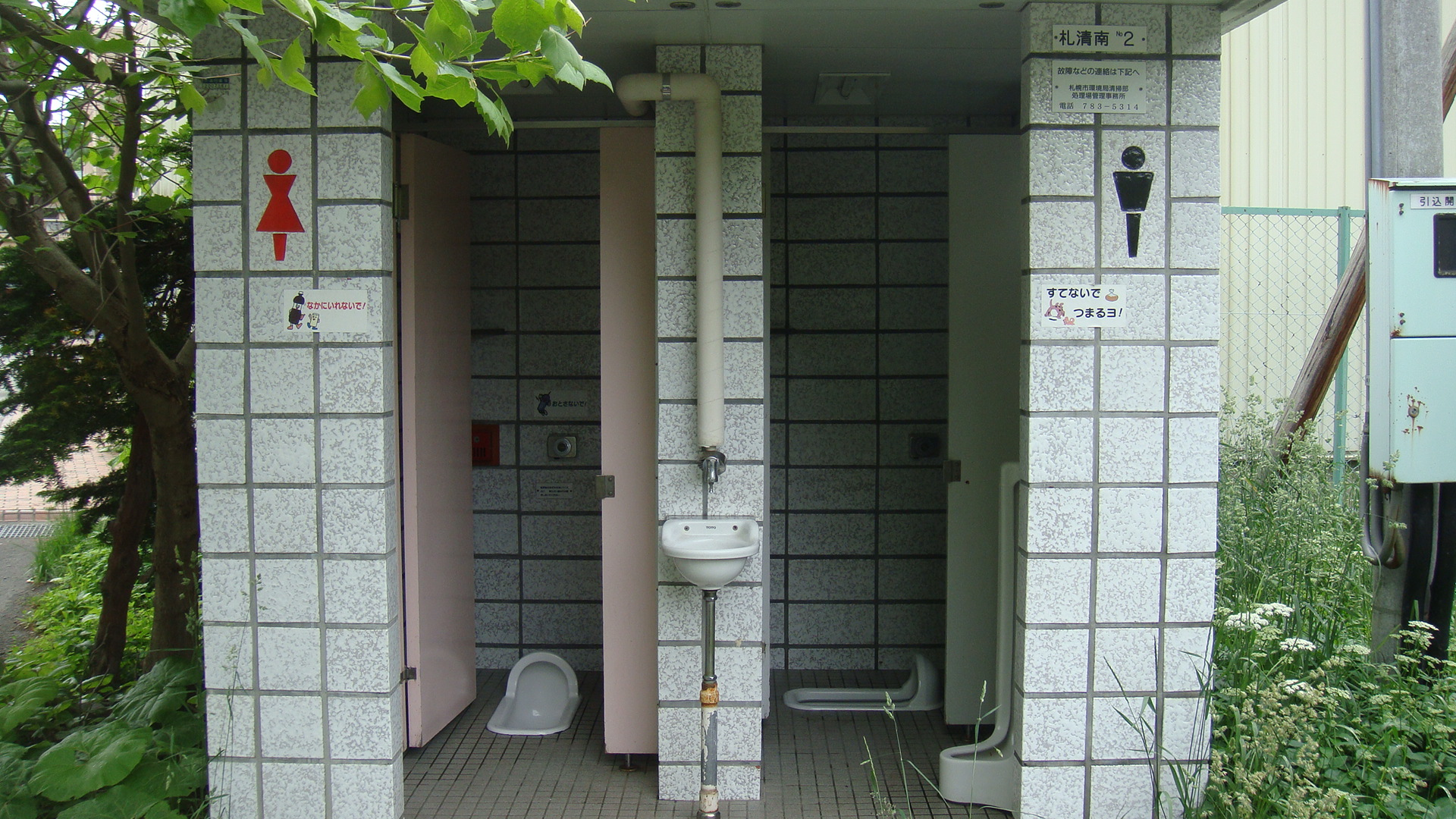
Public toilet at Jozankei Hot Springs, Hokkaido, Japan

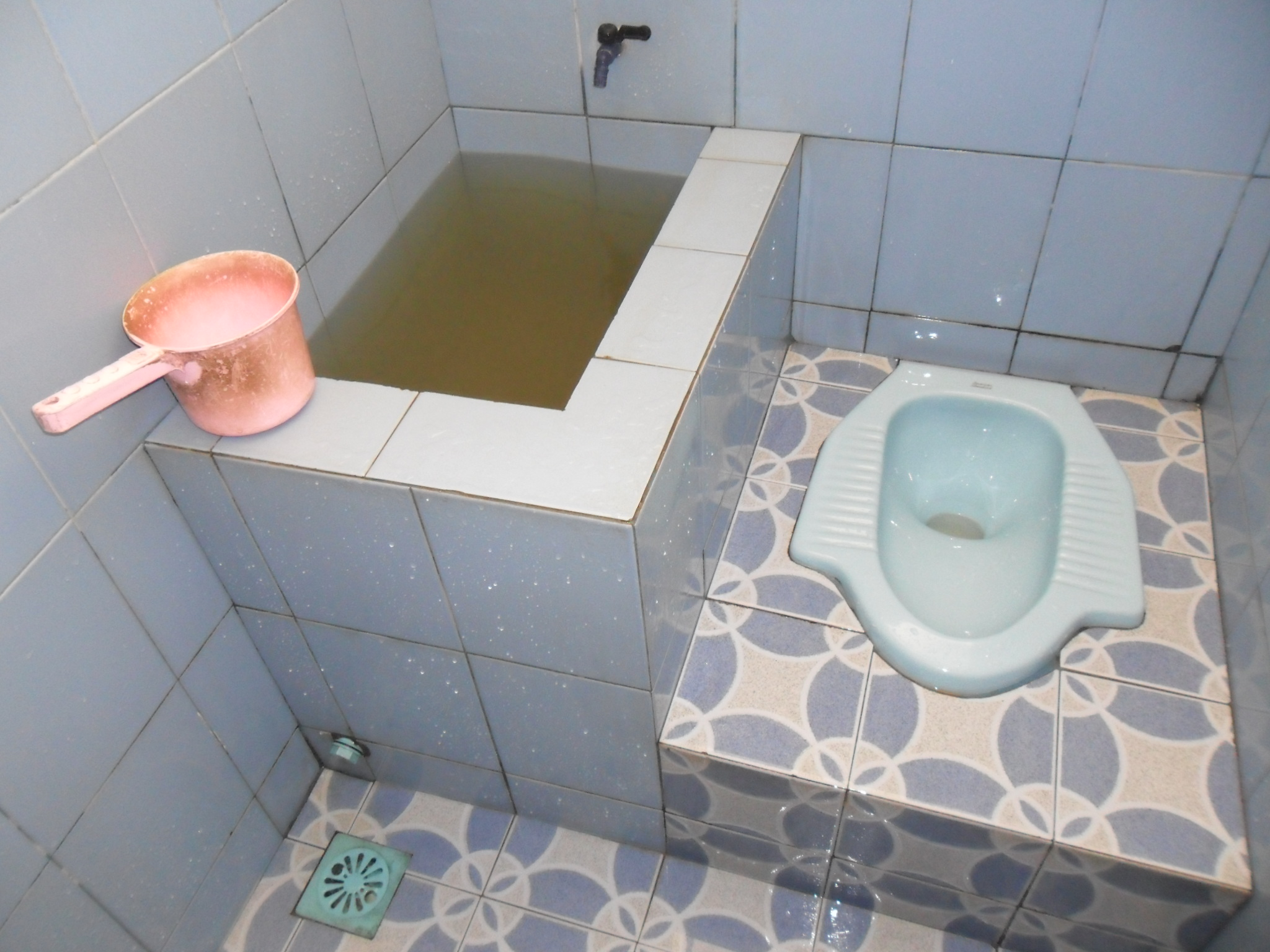
Squat toilet in Indonesia

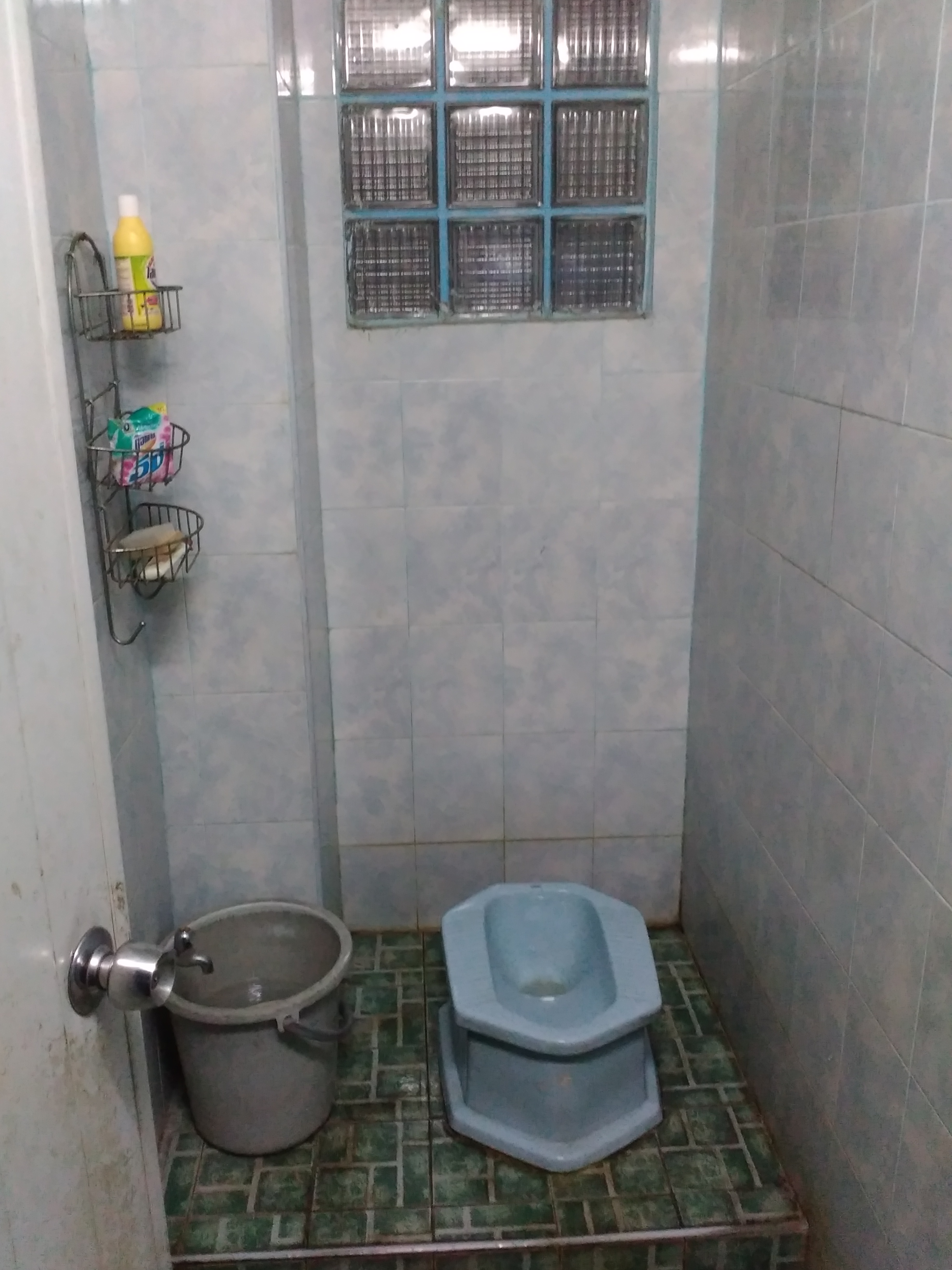
Squat toilet in Bangkok

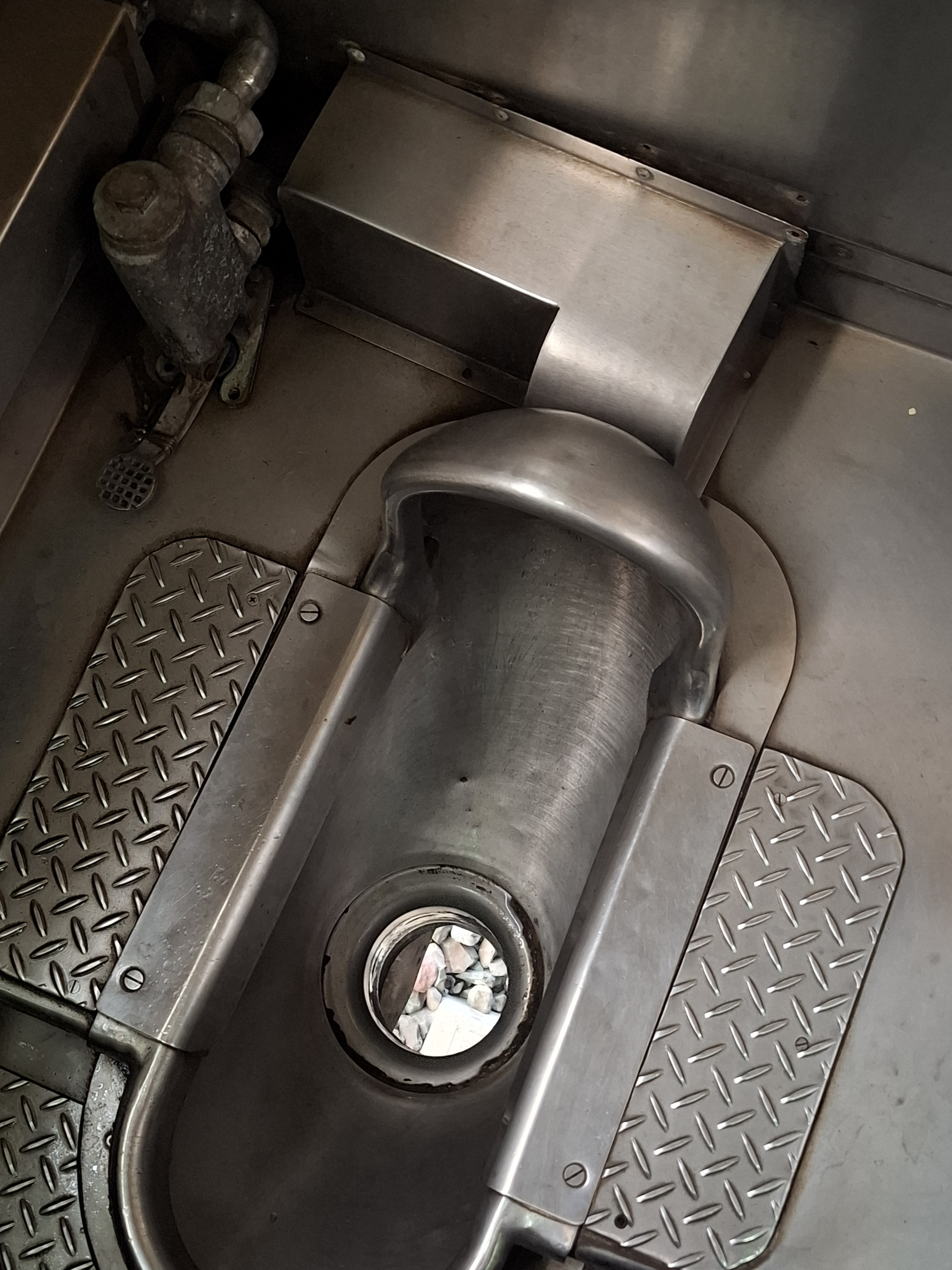
Squat toilet in Special Express No. 14 (Chiang Mai - Krung Thep Aphiwat)

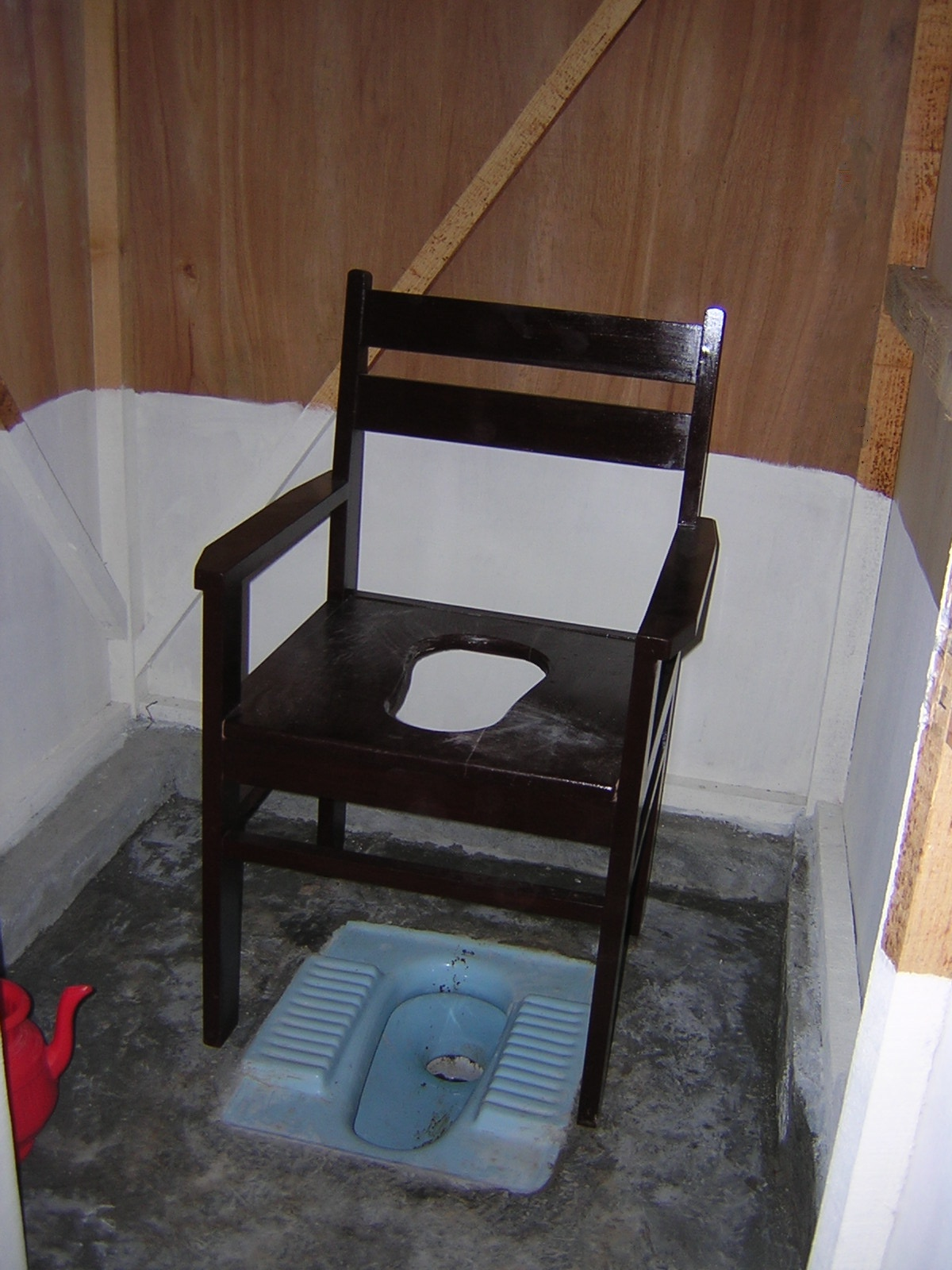
Squat toilet with seat for old people or for people with disabilities

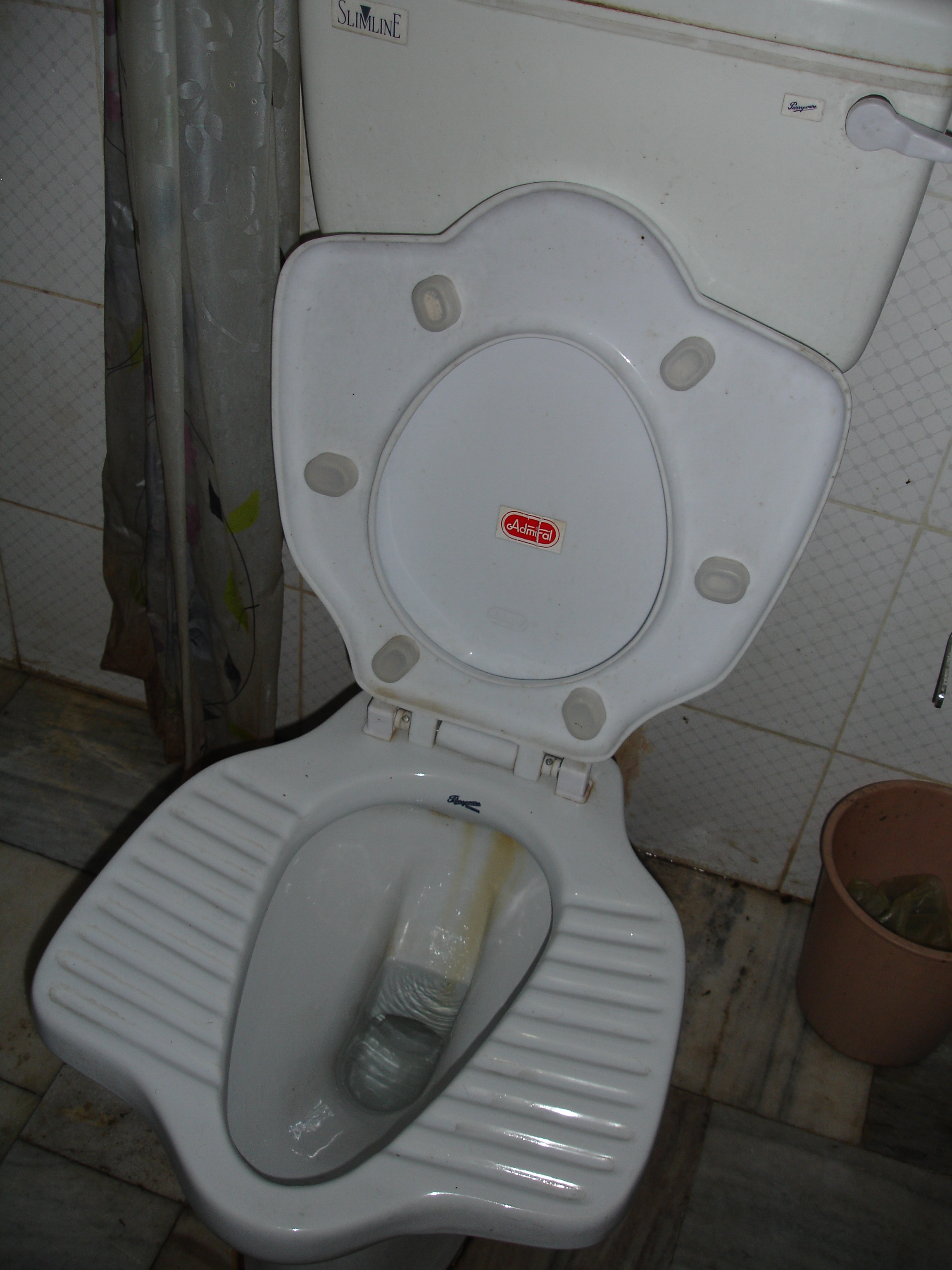
Hybrid toilet that can be used in squat mode

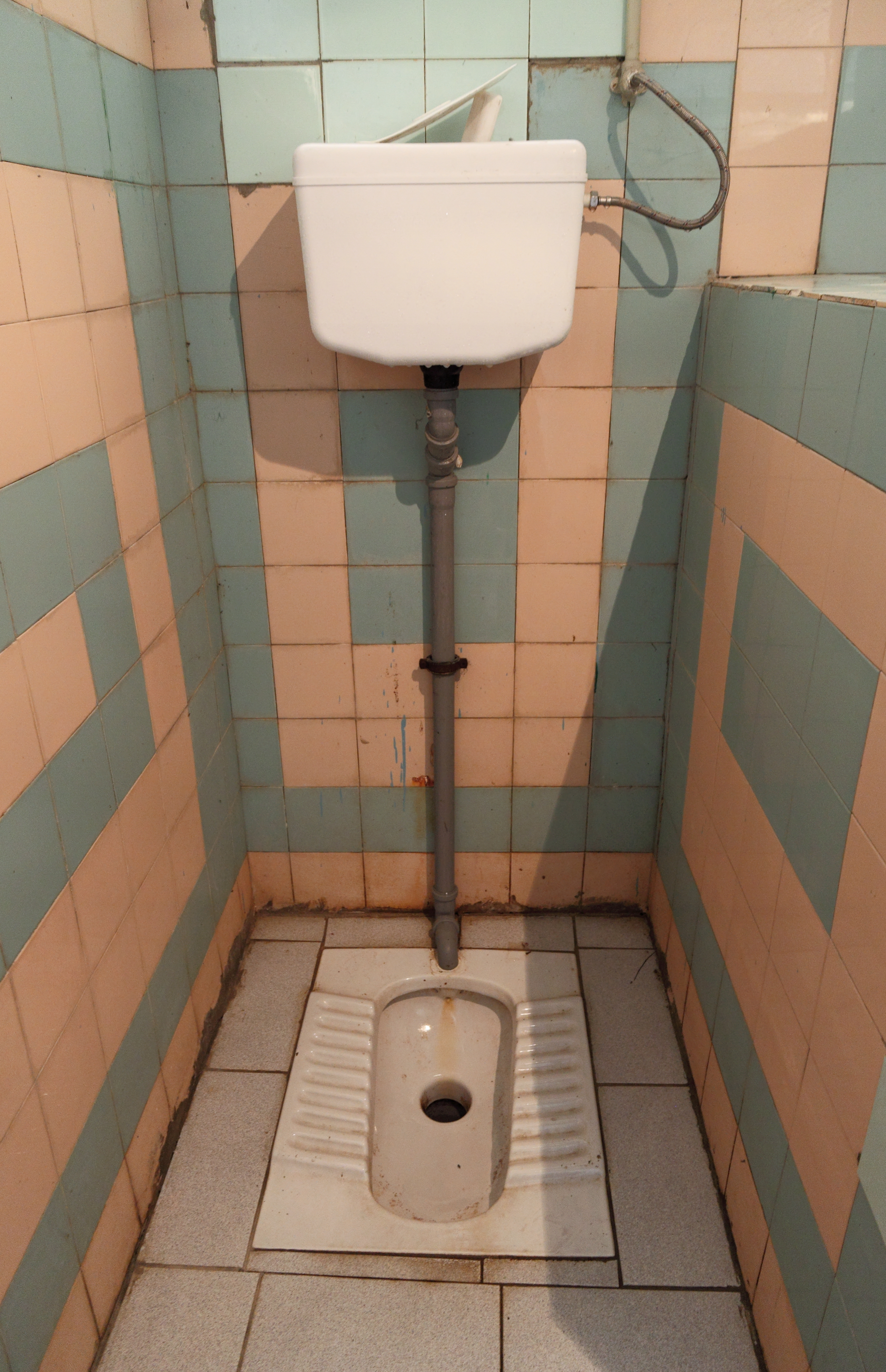
Squat toilet in Pitsunda, Abkhazia, Georgia.

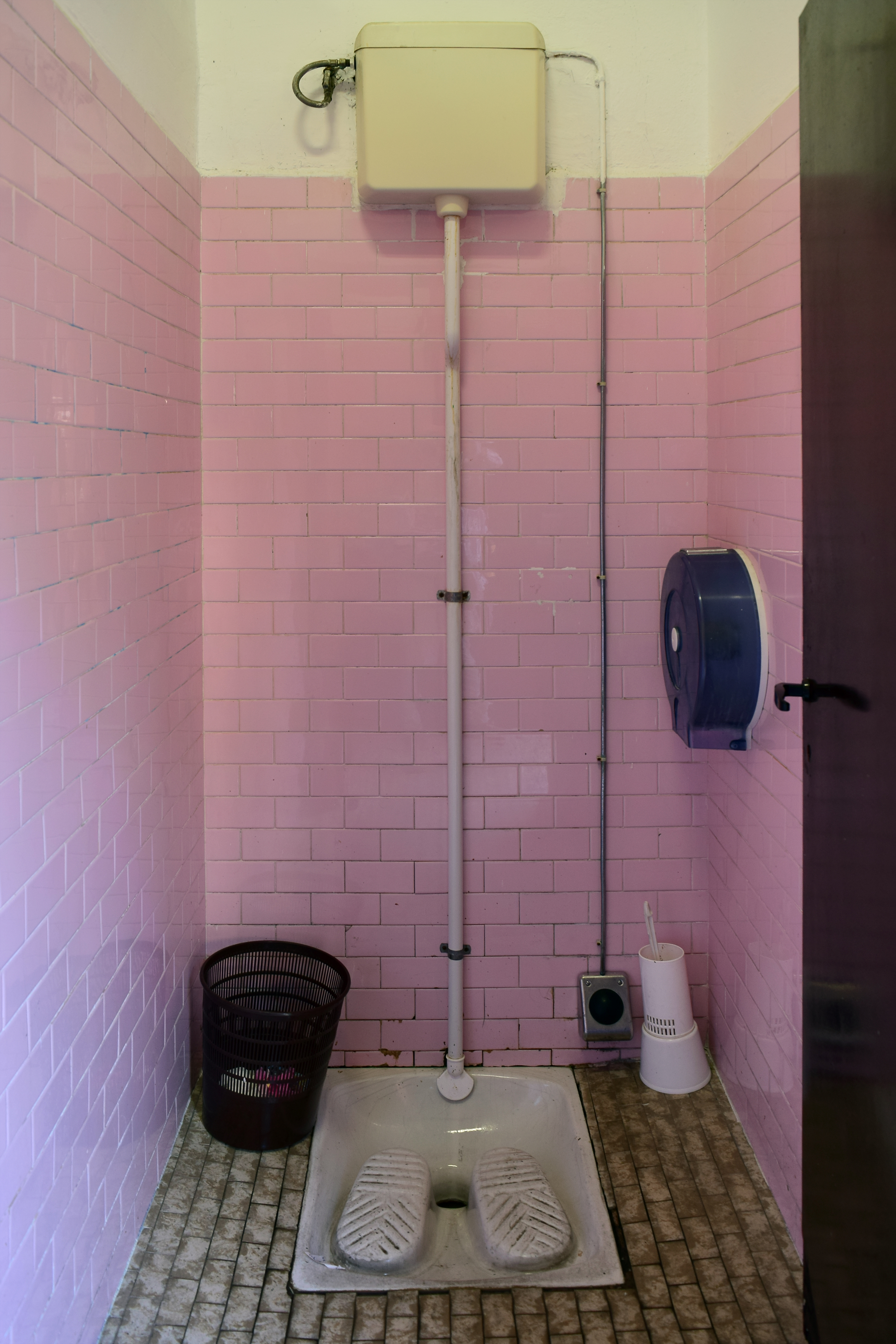
Squat toilet at a train station in Italy

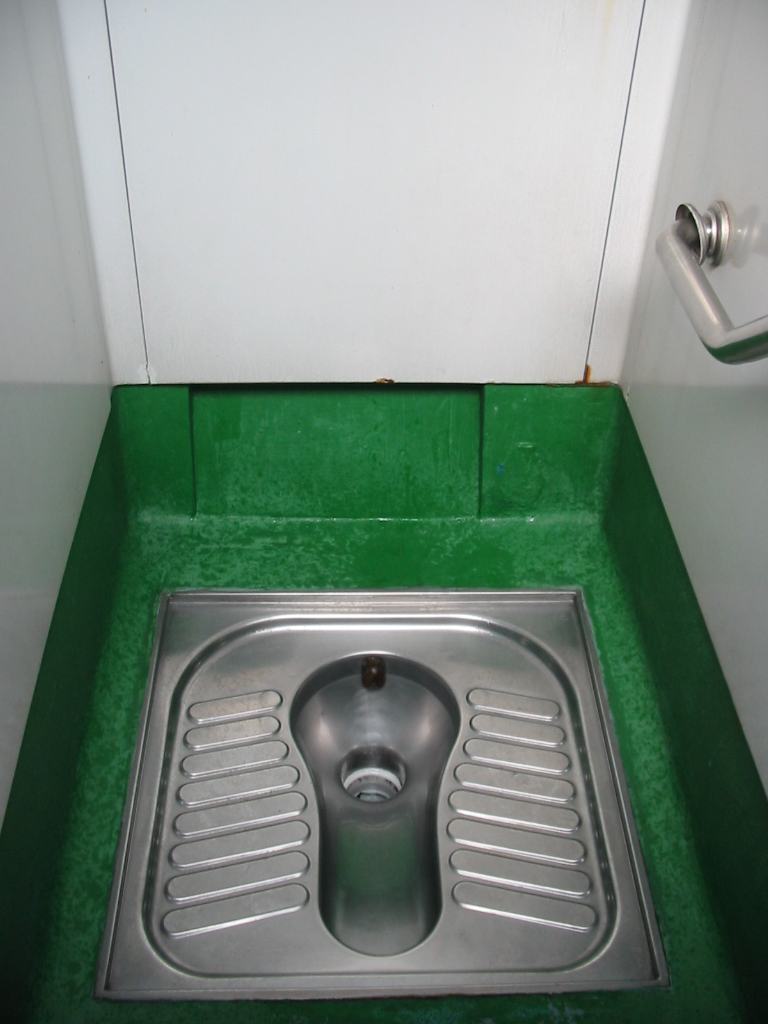
Metal-made squat toilet in Hong Kong

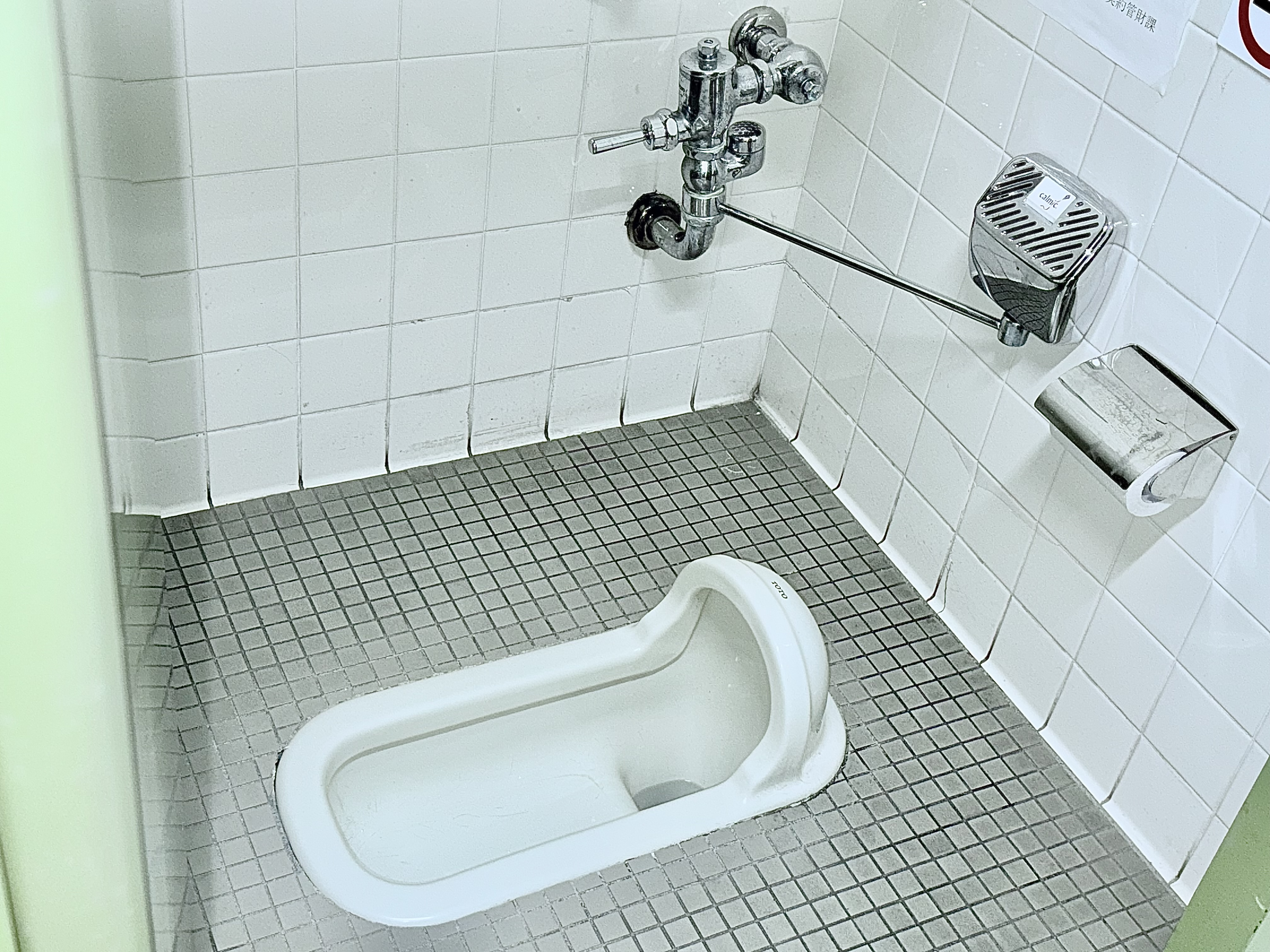
Japanese squat toilet

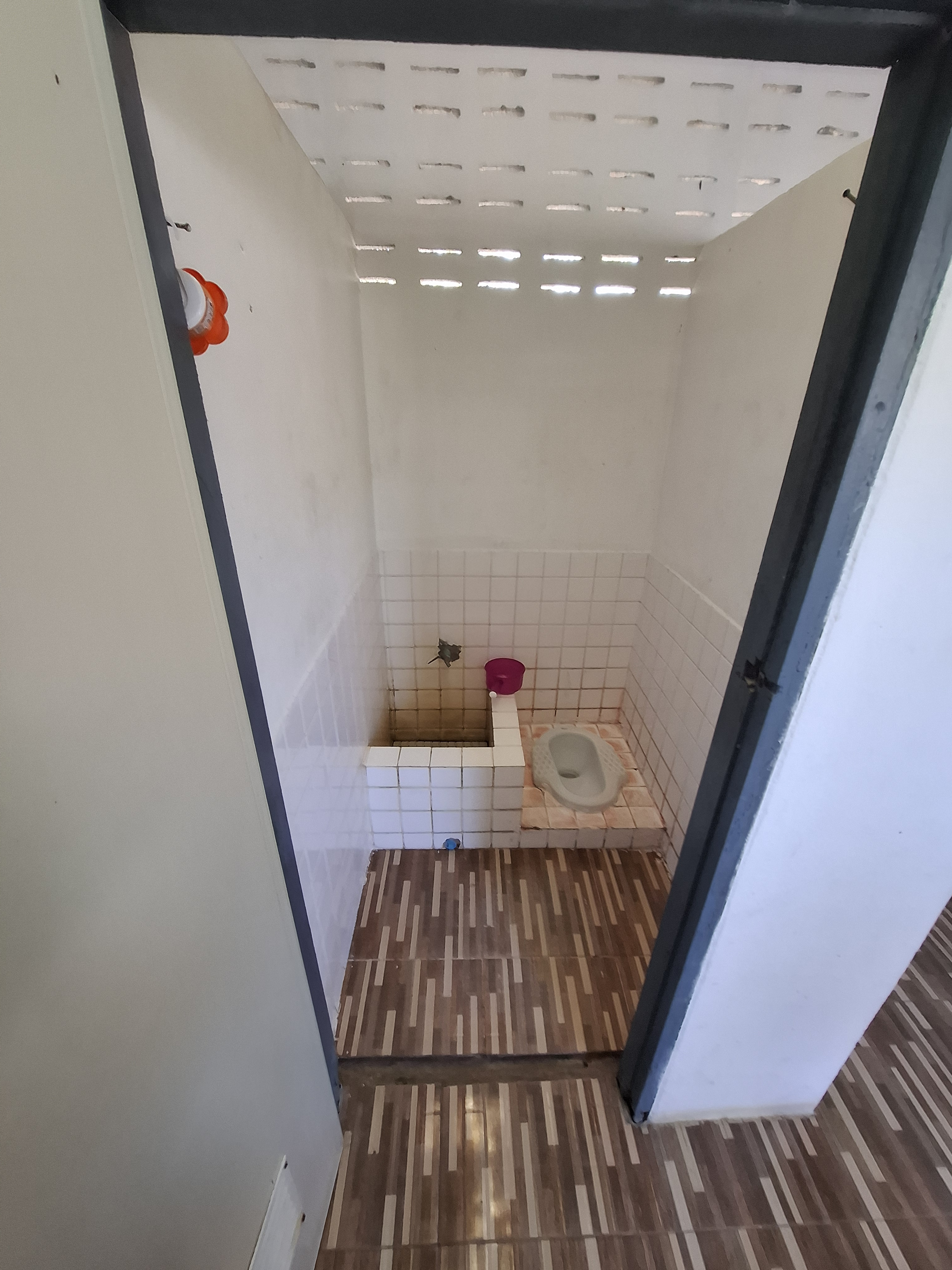
Squat toilet at Pa Hin Ngam National Park

== See also ==
- Bidet
- Bidet shower
- Toilet paper
- Levator ani
- Squatty Potty
