= List of human positions =

Physical configurations of the human body

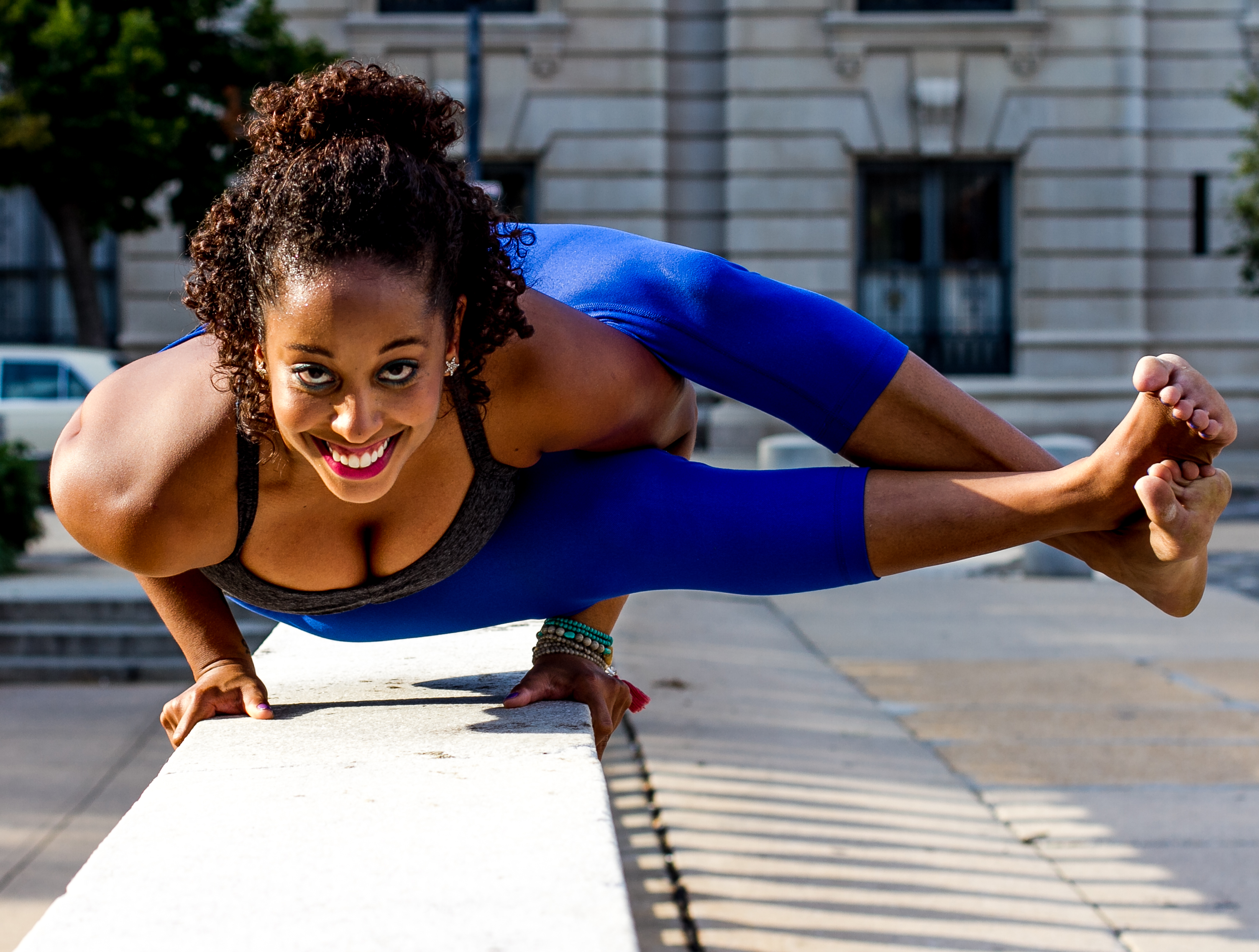
The human body is capable of a wide variety of positions, as exemplified by this energetic yoga position, "astavakrasana".

Human positions are different physical configurations that the human body can take. There are several synonyms that refer to human positioning, often used interchangeably, but having specific nuances of meaning.

Position is a general term for a configuration of the human body. Posture means an intentionally or habitually assumed position, and pose implies an artistic, aesthetic, athletic, or spiritual intention of the position.

Attitude refers to postures assumed for purpose of imitation, intentional or not, as well as in some standard collocations in reference to some distinguished types of posture: "Freud never assumed a fencer's attitude, yet almost all took him for a swordsman." Bearing refers to the manner of the posture, as well as of gestures and other aspects of the conduct taking place.

== Basic positions ==
While not moving, a human is usually in one of the following basic positions:

=== All fours ===
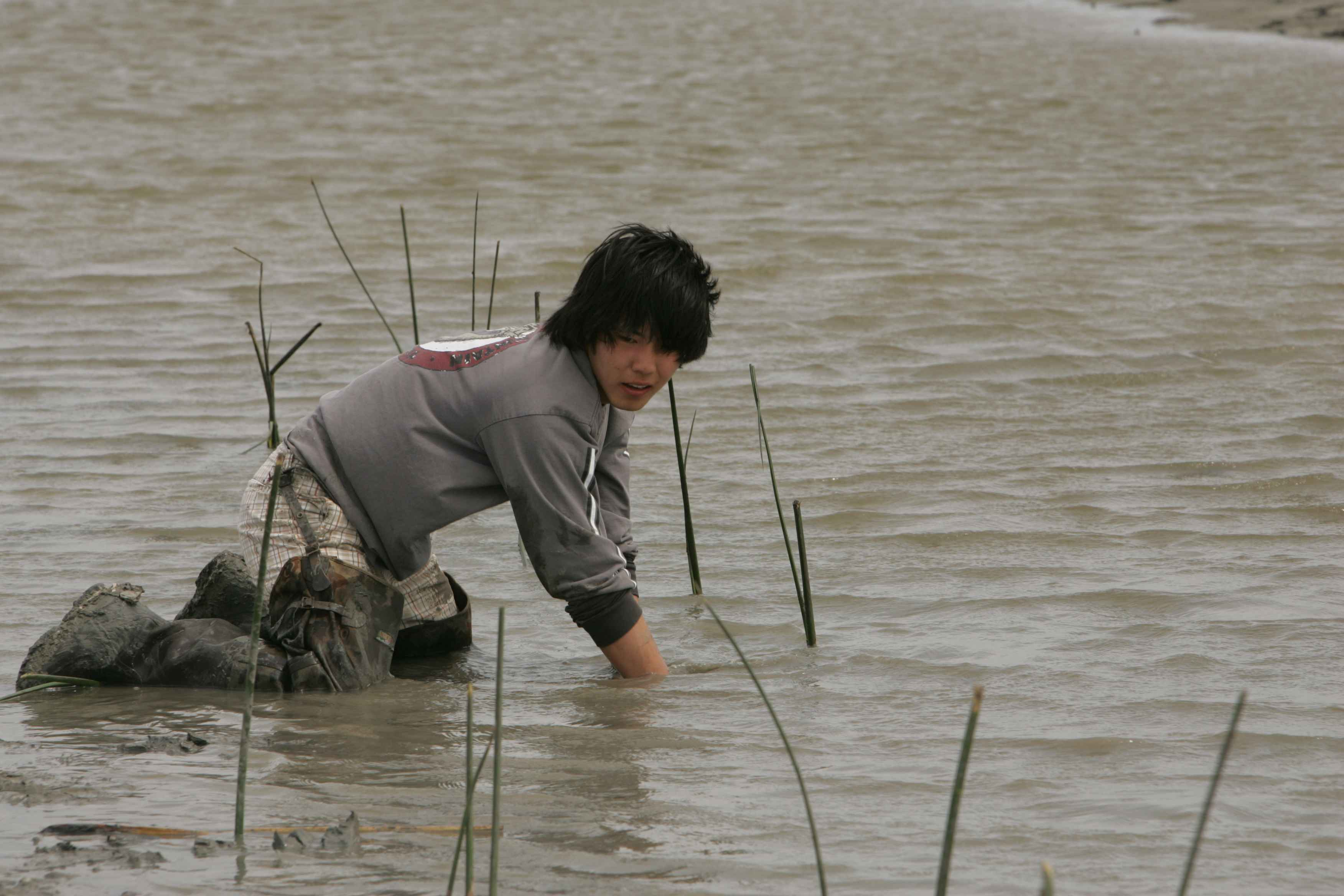
Young man on all fours in shallow water.

This is the static form of crawling which is a form of locomotion instinctive in very young children. It is a commonly used childbirth position in both Western and non-Western cultures, in which context it is known as the Gaskin Maneuver.

This position is sometimes viewed as sexually explicit due to its association with sexual initiative or availability.

=== Kneeling ===
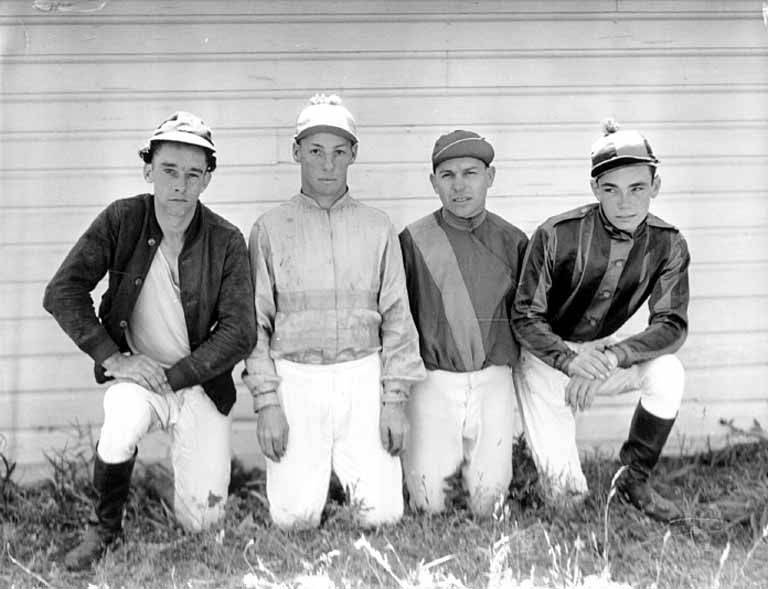
Inner two vertical kneeling. Outer two squatting/kneeling.

Kneeling is a basic human position where one or both knees touch the ground. It is used as a resting position, during childbirth and as an expression of reverence and submission. While kneeling, the angle between the legs can vary from zero to widely splayed out, flexibility permitting. It is common to kneel with one leg and squat with the other leg.

While kneeling, the thighs and upper body can be at various angles in particular:

- Vertical kneel: where both the thighs and upper body are vertical – also known as "standing on one's knees"
- Sitting kneel: where the thighs are near horizontal and the buttocks sit back on the heels with the upper body vertical - for example as in Seiza, Virasana, and Vajrasana (yoga)
- Taking a knee: where the upper body is vertical, one knee is touching the ground while the foot of the other leg is placed on the ground in front of the body

=== Lying ===
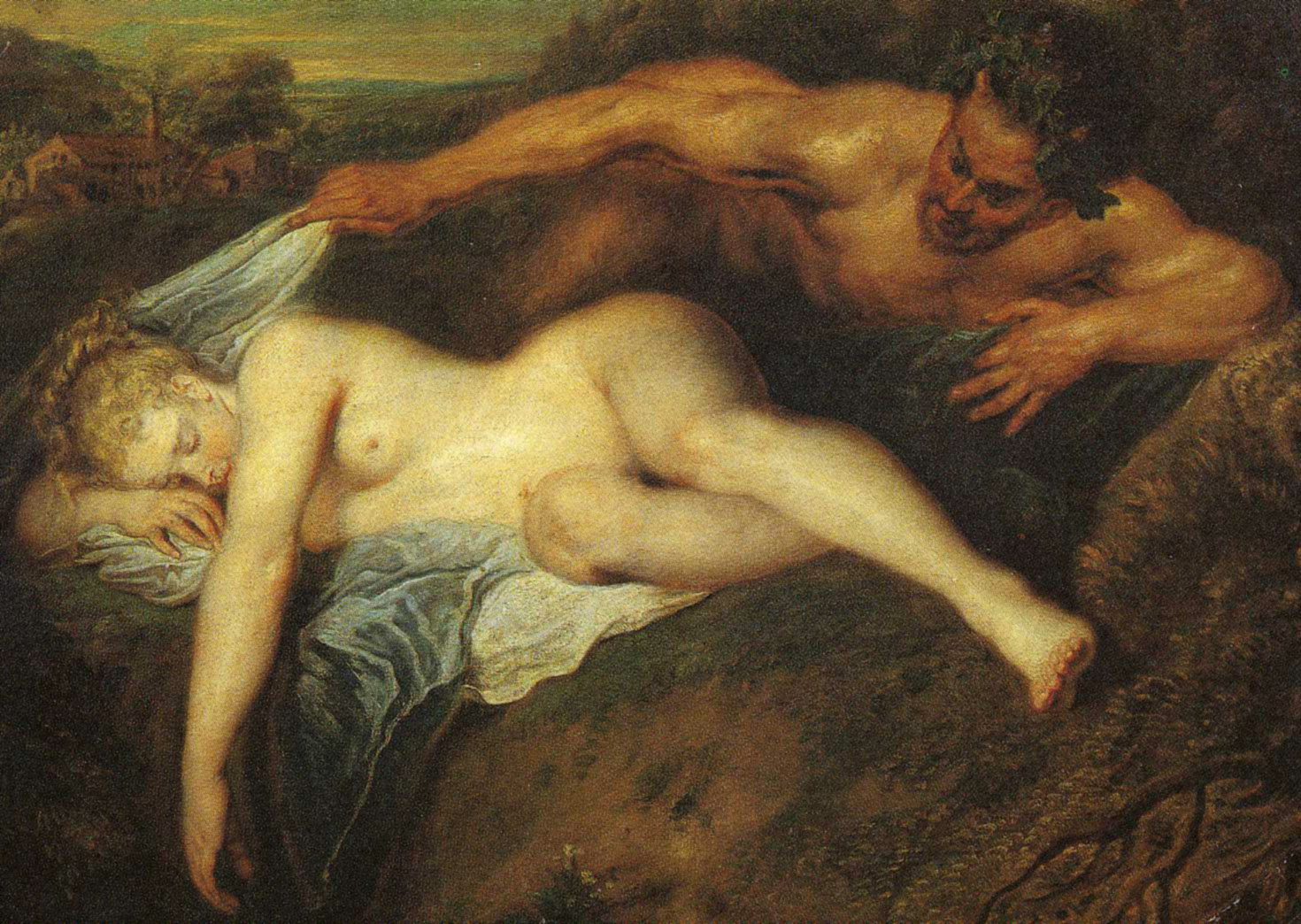
Jupiter et Antiope, by Antoine Watteau

When in lying position, the body may assume a great variety of shapes and positions. The following are the basic recognized positions:

- Supine position: lying on the back with the face up
- Prone position: lying on the chest with the face down ("lying down" or "going prone")
- Lying on either side, with the body straight or bent/curled forward or backward
- Fetal position: is lying or sitting curled, with limbs close to the torso and the head close to the knees

=== Sitting ===
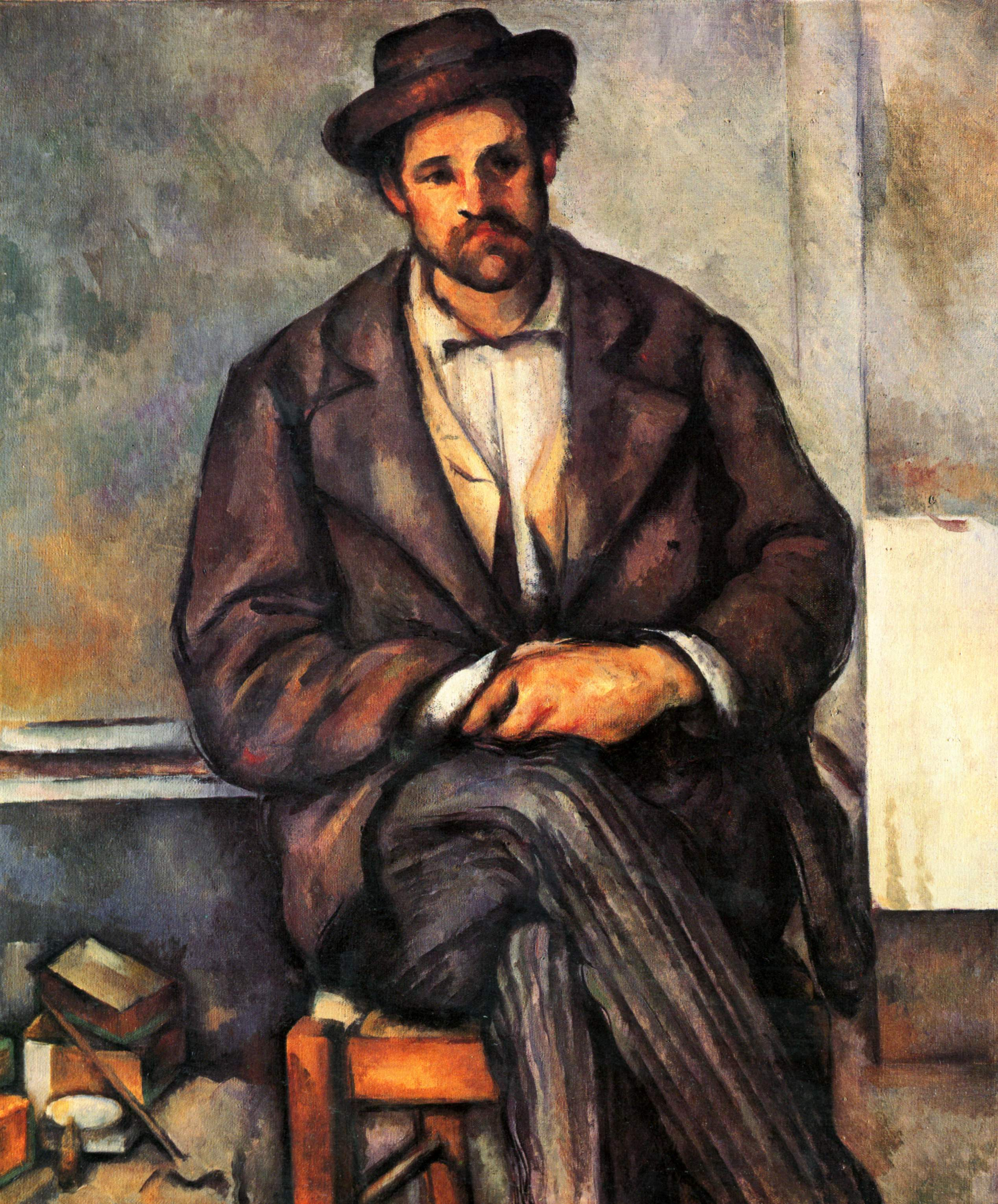
Paul Cézanne portrait of a man in a sitting position

Sitting requires the buttocks resting on a more or less horizontal structure, such as a chair or the ground. Special ways of sitting are with the legs horizontal, and in an inclined seat. While on a chair the shins are usually vertical, on the ground the shins may be crossed in the lotus position or be placed horizontally under the thigh in a seiza.

=== Squatting or crouching ===
Squatting is a posture where the weight of the body is on the feet (as with standing) but the knees and hips are bent. In contrast, sitting, involves taking the weight of the body, at least in part, on the buttocks against the ground or a horizontal object such as a chair seat. The angle between the legs when squatting can vary from zero to widely splayed out, flexibility permitting. Squatting may be either:

- full – known as full squat, deep squat, grok squat, Asian squat, third world squat, (sitting) on one's haunches, (sitting) on one's hunkers, or hunkering (down)
- partial – known as partial, standing, half, semi, parallel, shallow, intermediate, incomplete, or monkey squat

Crouching is usually considered to be synonymous with full squatting. It is common to squat with one leg and kneel with the other leg. One or both heels may be up when squatting. Young children often instinctively squat. Among Chinese, Southeast Asian, and Eastern European adults, squatting often takes the place of sitting or standing.

=== Standing ===
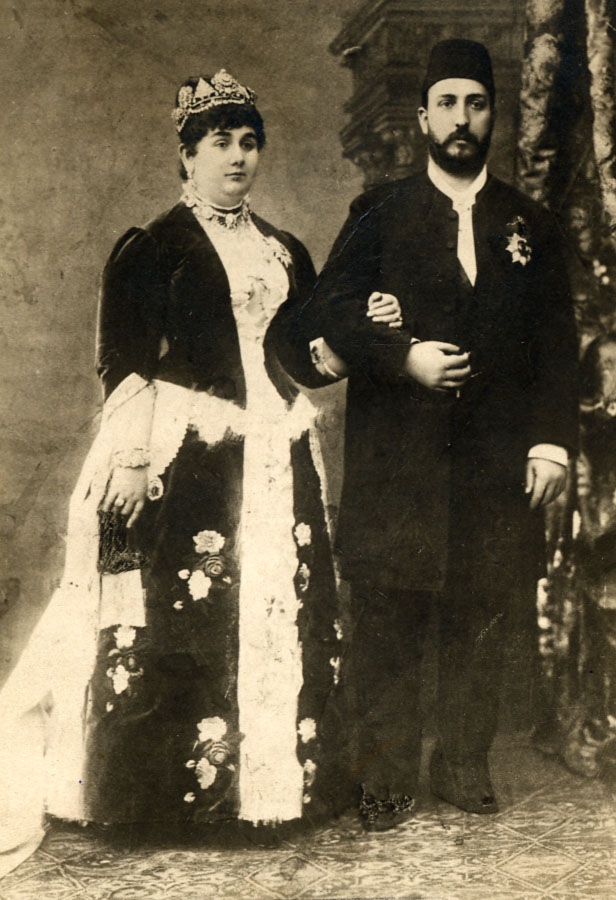
Standing couple, January 1873

Although quiet standing appears to be static, modern instrumentation shows it to be a process of rocking from the ankle in the sagittal plane. The sway of quiet standing is often likened to the motion of an inverted pendulum. There are many mechanisms in the body that are suggested to control this movement, e.g. a spring action in muscles, higher control from the nervous system or core muscles.

Although the posture is not dangerous in itself, there are pathologies associated with prolonged intervals of unrelieved standing. One short-term condition is orthostatic hypotension, and long-term conditions are sore feet, stiff legs, and low back pain.

Some variations of standing are:

- Standing with arms akimbo, that is with hands on hips, elbows pointing outward
- Standing with folded arms
- Standing contrapposto, with most of the weight on one foot so that its shoulders and arms twist off-axis from the hips and legs in the axial plane
- Standing at attention, upright with an assertive and correct posture: "chin up, chest out, shoulders back, stomach in", arms at the side, heels together, toes apart

== Contexts ==
=== Asanas ===
Certain ana postures were originally intended primarily to restore and maintain a practitioner's well-being, to improve the body's flexibility and vitality, and to promote the ability to remain in seated meditation for extended periods.

=== Atypical positions ===
Atypical positions are common to break dancing, gymnastics, and yoga, and may include:

- standing on one leg
- handstand
- head stand
- spreadeagle
- crab position

The human body can be suspended in various stable positions, where the support is above the center of gravity. The positioning may be voluntary or involuntary.

=== Childbirth positions ===
In addition to the lithotomy position still commonly used by many obstetricians, childbirth positions used by midwives and traditional birth attendants include squatting, standing, kneeling, and on all fours, often in a sequence.

=== Dance positions ===
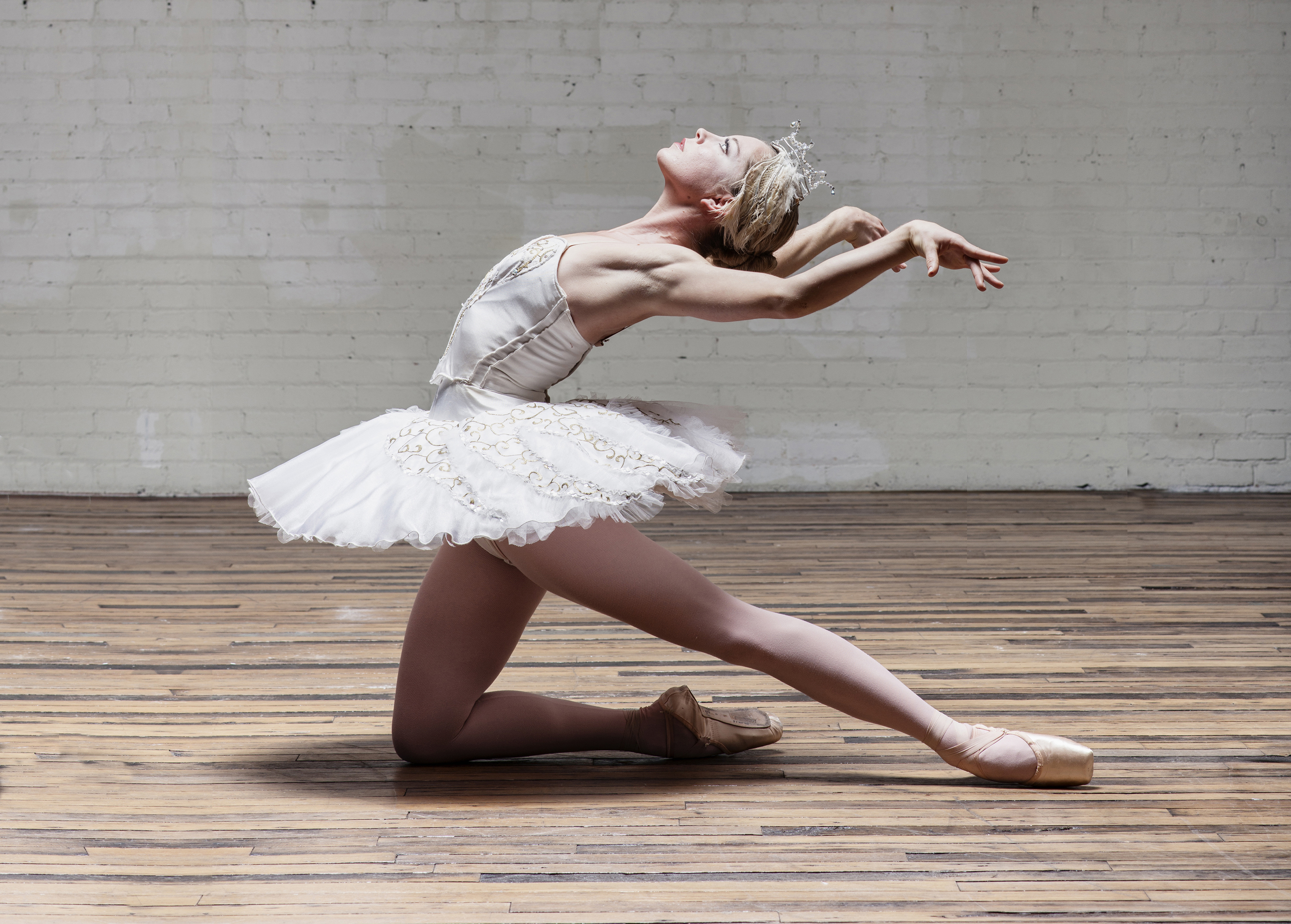
Classical ballet position

Dance position is a position of a dancer or a mutual position of a dance couple assumed during a dance. Describing and mastering proper dance positions is an important part of dance technique.

=== Eating positions ===
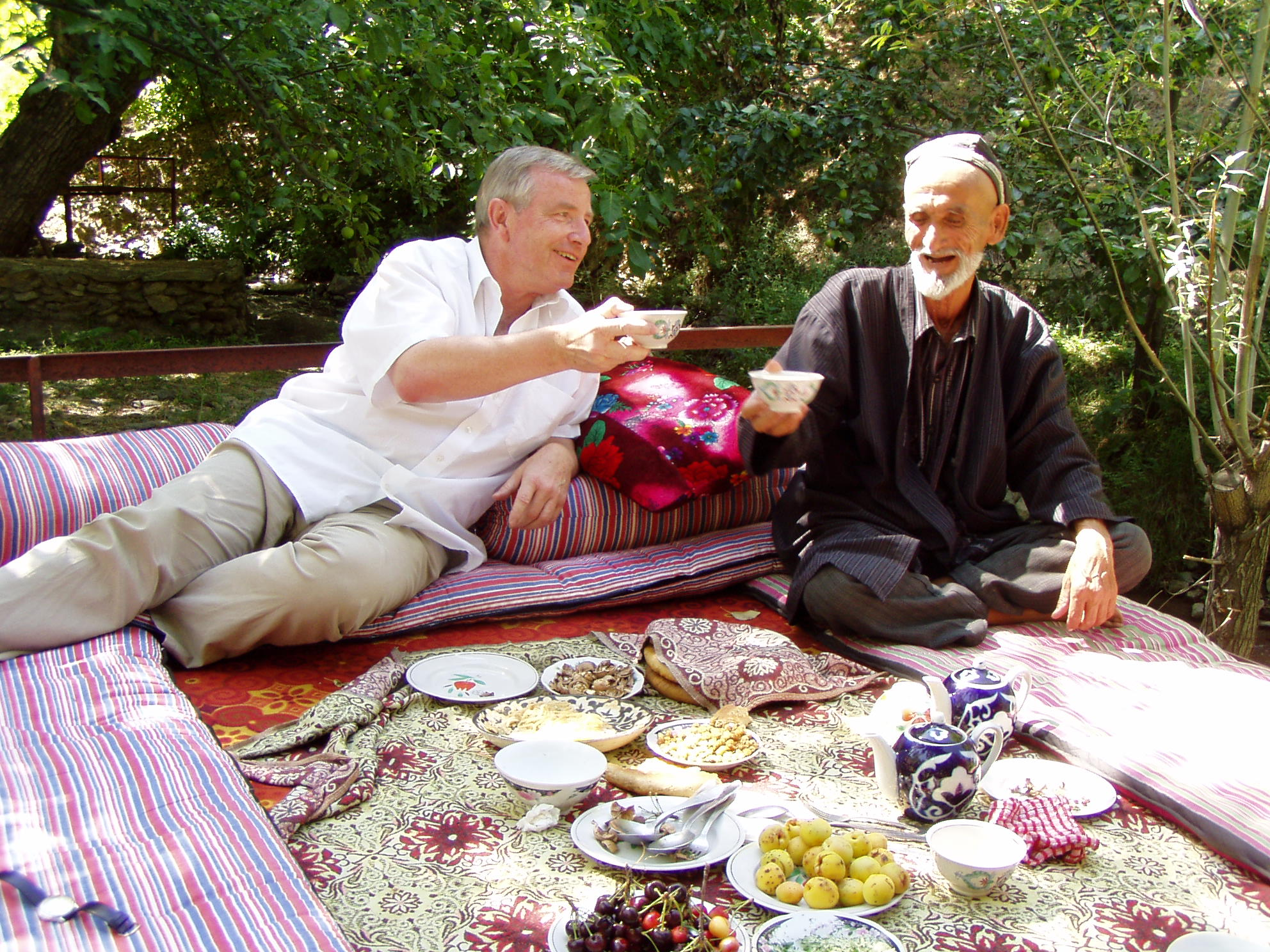
People sharing a meal in Uzbekistan

Eating positions vary in different regions of the world, as culture strongly influences the way people eat their meals. For example, in most of the Middle Eastern countries, eating while sitting on the floor is most common, and it is believed to be healthier than eating while sitting at a table.

Eating in a reclining position was favored by the Ancient Greeks at a celebration they called a symposium, and this custom was adopted by the Ancient Romans. Ancient Hebrews also adopted this posture for traditional celebrations of a Passover Seder, to symbolize freedom.

=== Heat escape lessening position ===
The heat escape lessening position (HELP) is a way to position oneself to reduce heat loss in cold water. It is taught as part of the curriculum in Australia, North America, and Ireland for lifeguard and boating safety training. It involves positioning one's knees together and hugging them close to the chest using one's arms.

=== Medical positions ===
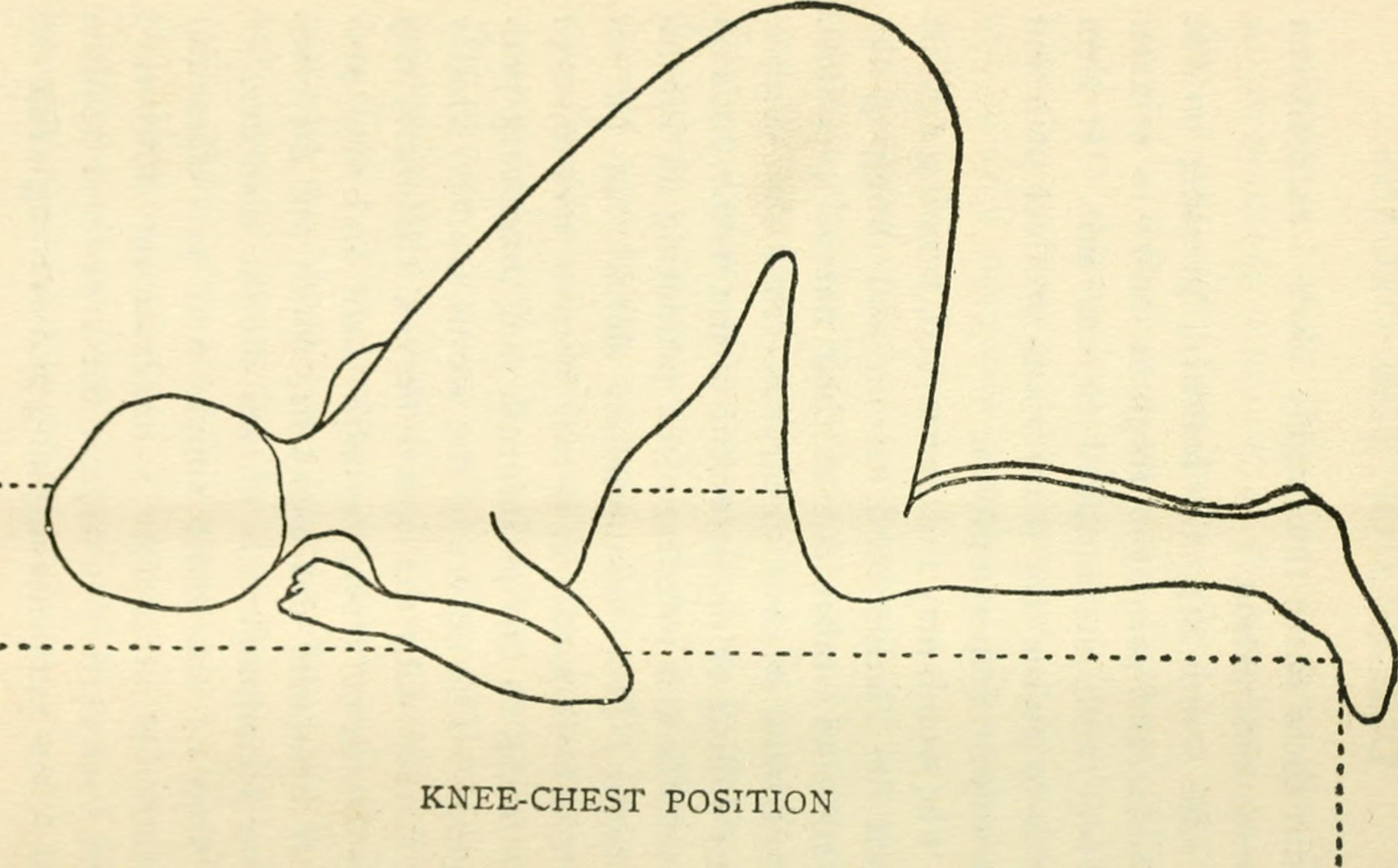
The knee-chest position

The following positions are specifically used in medicine:

- Anatomical position
- Bozeman's position
- Decubitus position
- Fowler's position
- High Fowler's position
- Knee-chest position
- Knee-elbow position
- Lateral position
- Lithotomy position
- Mayer position
- Prone position
- Rose's position
- Semi-Fowler position
- Sims' position
- Supine position
- Tripod position
- Trendelenburg position
- Verticosubmental position
- Waters' position

=== Recovery position ===
The recovery position or coma position refers to one of a series of variations on a lateral recumbent or three-quarters prone position of the body, into which an unconscious but breathing casualty can be placed as part of first aid treatment.

=== Resting positions ===
A large number of resting positions are possible, based on variations of sitting, squatting, kneeling or lying.

=== Riding positions ===
A "straddle" or "astride" position is usually adopted when riding a horse, donkey, or other beast of burden, with or without the aid of a saddle. The position is also used for sitting on analogous vehicles, such as bicycles, motorcycles, or unicycles, and on furniture, such as certain types of seating, and bidets. The posture is also used on some types of specialized workbenches (such as a shaving horse). By definition, an essential feature is having one leg on each side of whatever is being straddled. The related sidesaddle position allows riding without straddling, but is somewhat less secure against accidental dismounting or falling.

The straddle posture is often intermediate between standing and sitting positions, allowing body weight to be supported securely, while also affording a high degree of upper body mobility and dynamic balance during vigorous or extended motions.

=== Sex positions ===
Sex positions are positions which people may adopt during or for the purpose of sexual intercourse or other sexual activities. Sexual acts are generally described by the positions the participants adopt in order to perform those acts.

=== Shooting positions ===
- Kneeling position
- Prone position
- Standing position
- Sitting
- Squatting

=== Sleeping positions ===
The sleeping position is the body configuration assumed by a person during or prior to sleeping. Six basic sleeping positions have been identified:

- Fetus (41%) – curling up in a fetal position. This was the most common position, and is especially popular with women.
- Log (15%) – lying on one's side with the arms down the side.
- Yearner (13%) – sleeping on one's side with the arms in front.
- Soldier (8%) – on one's back with the arms pinned to the sides.
- Freefall (7%) – on one's front with the arms around the pillow and the head tilted to one side.
- Starfish (5%) – on one's back with the arms around the pillow.

=== Stress positions ===
Stress positions place the human body in such a way that a great amount of weight is placed on just one or two muscles and joints. Forcing prisoners to adopt such positions is used for extracting information or as a punishment, possibly amounting to torture. Such positions also are sometimes used as a punishment for children.

=== Submissive positions ===
Submissive positions are often ceremonial and dictated by culture. They may be performed as a mutual sign of respect between equals or as a sign of submission to a higher-ranking individual or to a ceremonial object.

- Bowing is the lowering of the head and torso towards the person or object of reverence, often briefly. The extent of a bow ranges from a simple head nod to a 90–degree bending at the waist. Though less common in Western cultures, it remains an important sign of respect in many Eastern cultures, and is also used in the ceremonies of various religions.
  - In bowing and scraping, the right hand is placed across the abdomen while the right leg is drawn or "scraped" back during a bow.
  - In Western cultures, it is often considered proper for women to perform a curtsey by bending the knees instead of a bow.
- Genuflection (or genuflexion) is bending at least one knee to the ground, was from early times a gesture of deep respect for a superior.
- Kneeling is associated with reverence, submission and obeisance.
- Kowtowing is the act of deep respect shown by kneeling and bowing so low as to have one's head touching the ground.
- Prostration is the placement of the body in a reverentially or submissively prone position.

== See also ==
- Abnormal posturing
- Anatomical terms of location
- Alexander Technique
- Contortionism
- Ergonomics
- Feldenkrais Method
- Gait (human)
- Human anatomical terms
- Mannequin
- Mitzvah Technique
- Neutral spine
- Positional asphyxia
- Posture release imagery
- Rolfing Structural Integration
- Terrestrial locomotion in animals
