= Surgical positions =

Placement of a patient in particular physical position during surgery

Surgical positioning is the practice of placing a patient in a particular physical position during surgery. The goal in selecting and adjusting a particular surgical position is to maintain the patient's safety while allowing access to the surgical site. Often a patient must be placed in an unnatural position to gain access to the surgical site.

Positioning normally occurs after the administration of anesthesia.

In addition to considerations related to the location of the surgical site, the selection of a surgical position is made after considering relevant physical and physiological factors, such as body alignment, circulation, respiratory constraints, and the musculatory system to prevent stress on the patient. Physical traits of the patient must also be considered including size, age, weight, physical condition, and allergies. The type of anesthesia used also affects the decision.

== Factors influencing the choice ==
Pressure is the force put on the patient's body. Those forces can stem from the surgery itself, instruments, drills, gravity, attachments, and bandages. The duration and intensity of the pressure is inversely correlated. The longer the duration of the pressure, the less pressure the body can endure. However, the body can endure a large amount of pressure for brief periods of time. The amount of pressure on the tissue is based on the size of the area of the contact: the smaller the point of pressure, the greater effect it will have on the tissue. The position of instruments can cause damage to the body if pressure is not relieved periodically.

The patient's own health is also considered. Respiratory and circulatory disorders, blood pressure, the patient's weight, old age, and body temperature may affect a patient's potential for pressure. Other forces that may damage the body are the folding of the tissue, called shear, friction from the tissue rubbing against other tissue, and moisture on the skin that can cause it to be more vulnerable to the other forces and factors, called maceration.

== Changing positions ==
If the patient has been immobilized, it may be important to change the patient's position periodically to prevent blood pooling, to stimulate circulation, and to relieve pressure on tissues. The patient should not be placed in unnatural positions for an extended period of time. After anesthesia, the patient's inability to react to movements may damage joints and muscle groups. Considerations should be taken not to damage these muscle groups by, for example, moving both legs simultaneously.

== Risks to extremities ==
The most common nerve injuries during surgery occur in the upper and lower extremities. Injuries to the nerves in the arm or shoulder can result in numbness, tingling, and decreased sensory or muscular use of the arm, wrist, or hand. Many operating room injuries could be solved by simply restraining the arms and legs. Other causes of nerve or muscular damage to the extremities is caused by pressure on the body by the surgical team leaning on the patient's arms and legs. The patient's arms can be protected from these risks by using an arm sled. Separation of the sternum during a heart procedure can also cause the first rib to put pressure on the nerves in the shoulder. The lithotomy position is also known to cause stress on the lower extremities.

== Positions ==
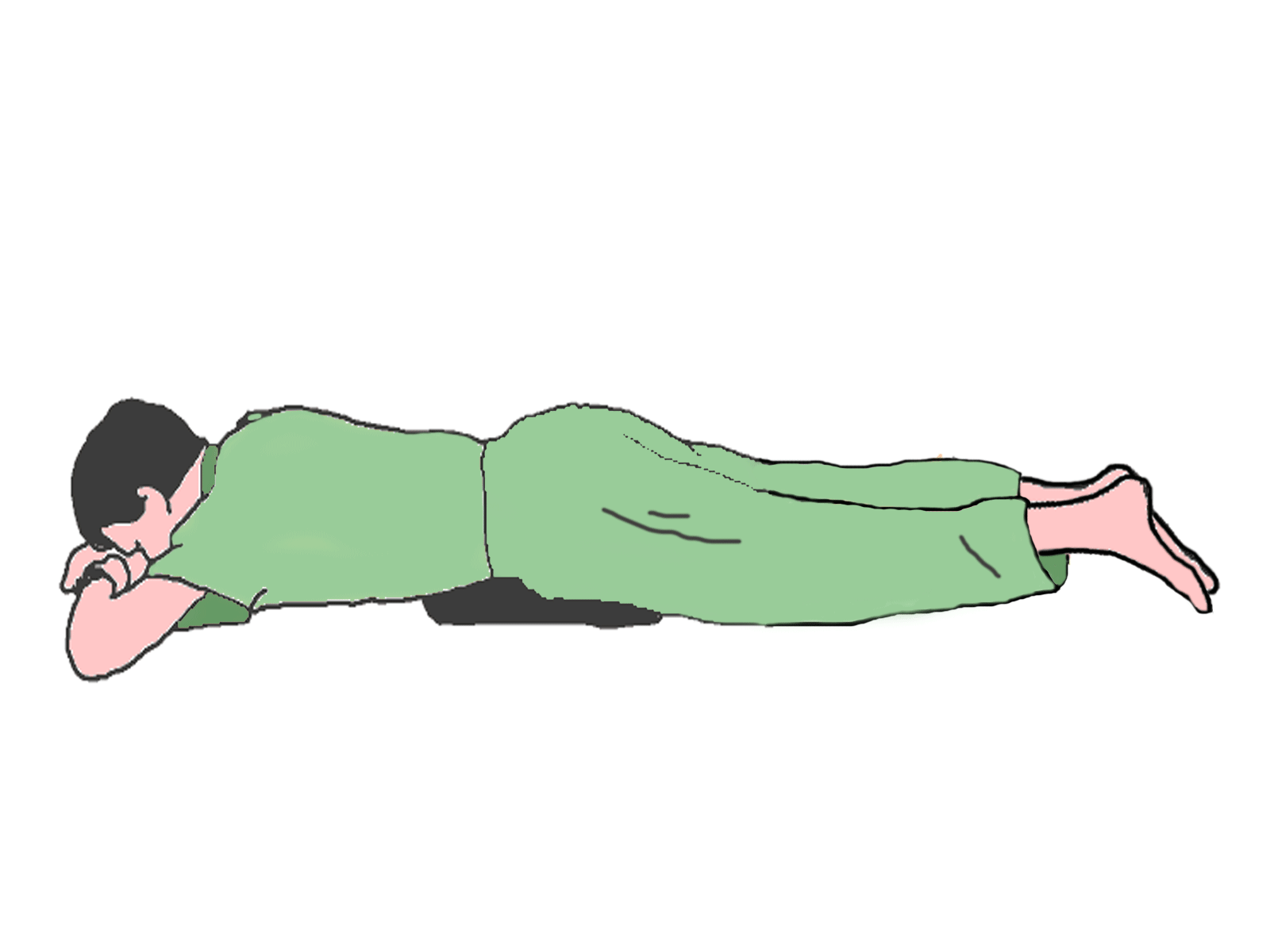
Prone Position

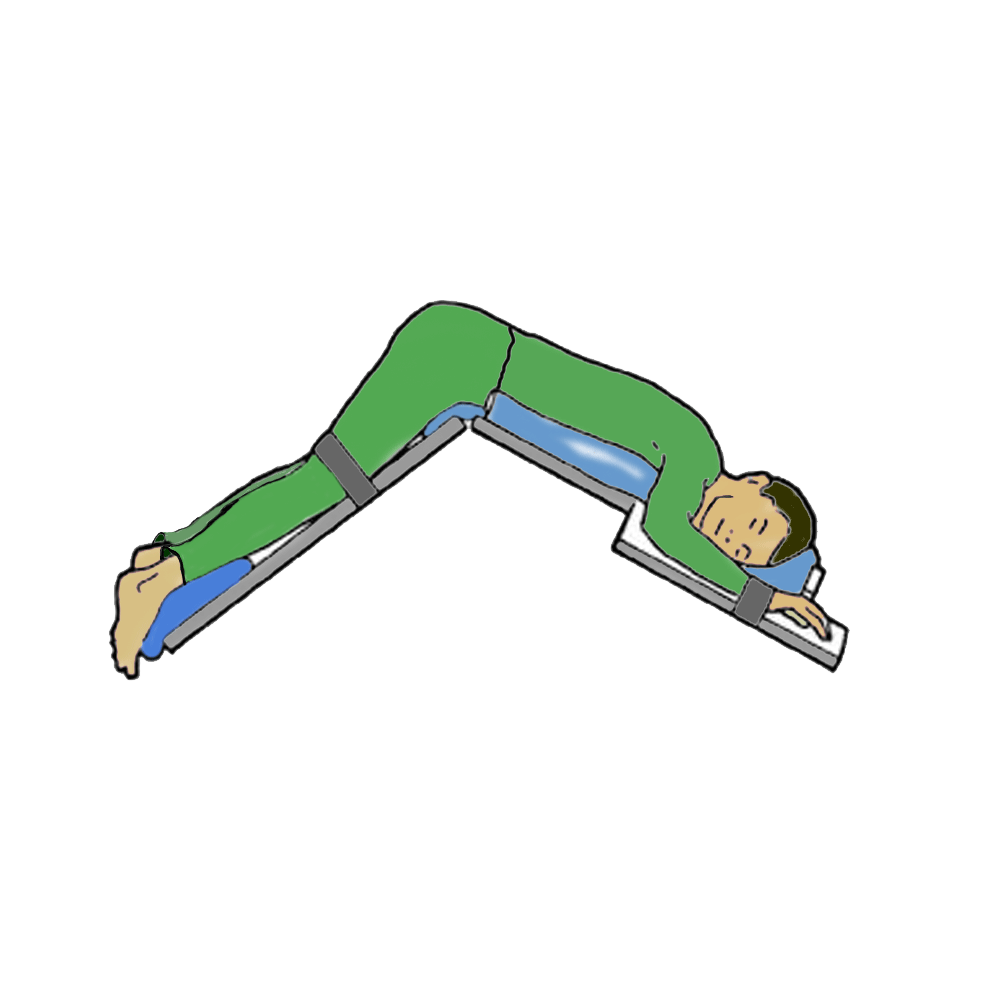
Jackknife position

A surgical fracture table is a table that is used for applying traction to broken limbs while the body is fixed in place, allowing the surgeon to reduce the broken extremity without requiring too much assistance, and then holding the limb in this fixed and reduced position while the surgeon applies external fixation, such as a cast or splint, or internal fixation, such as a nail or plate and screws, to maintain the reduction of the extremity. A surgical fracture table enables the patient to be placed in the following positions:

Supine position
The most common surgical position. The patient lies with back flat on operating room bed.
Trendelenburg position
Same as supine position but the upper torso is lowered.
Reverse Trendelenburg position
Same as supine but upper torso is raised and legs are lowered.
Fracture Table Position
For hip fracture surgery. Upper torso is in supine position with unaffected leg raised. Affected leg is extended with no lower support. The leg is strapped at the ankle and there is padding in the groin to keep pressure on the leg and hip.
Lithotomy position
Used for gynecological, anal, and urological procedures. Upper torso is placed in the supine position, legs are raised and secured, arms are extended.
Fowler's position
Begins with patient in supine position. Upper torso is slowly raised to a 90 degree position.
Semi-Fowlers position
Lower torso is in supine position and the upper torso is bent at a nearly 85 degree position. The patient's head is secured by a restraint.
Prone position
Patient lies with stomach on the bed. Abdomen can be raised off the bed. Researchers observed that patients can benefit from prone positioning.
Jackknife position
Also called the Kraske position. Patient's abdomen lies flat on the bed. The bed is scissored so the hip is lifted and the legs and head are low.
Knee-chest position
Similar to the jackknife except the legs are bent at the knee at a 90-degree angle.
Lateral position
Also called the side-lying position, it is like the jackknife except the patient is on his or her side. Other similar positions are Lateral chest and Lateral kidney.
Lloyd-Davies position
It is a medical term referring to a common position for surgical procedures involving the pelvis and lower abdomen. The majority of colorectal and pelvic surgery is conducted with the patient in the Lloyd-Davis position.
Kidney position
The kidney position is much like the lateral position except the patient's abdomen is placed over a lift in the operating table that bends the body to allow access to the retroperitoneal space. A kidney rest is placed under the patient at the location of the lift.
Sims' position
The Sims' position is a variation of the left lateral position. The patient is usually awake and helps with the positioning. The patient will roll to his or her left side. Keeping the left leg straight, the patient will slide the left hip back and bend the right leg. This position allows access to the anus.

== See also ==
- Surgical incisions
- Bed positioning
