= The Undertaker gimmick =

Professional wrestling character

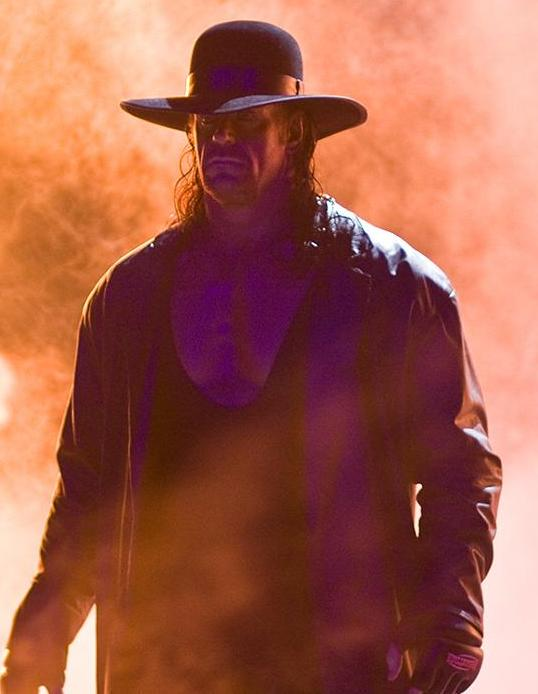
The Undertaker making his entrance in 2008

The Undertaker is a professional wrestling character used in WWE. The character was portrayed by Mark Calaway from 1990 to 2020, and briefly by Brian Lee in 1994. Widely regarded as one of the greatest and most enduring gimmicks in professional wrestling history, the character is celebrated for its theatricality, macabre themes, and Calaway’s strict dedication to maintaining kayfabe (the presentation of staged performances as genuine).

The character was originally conceived by Vince McMahon, Chairman of the World Wrestling Federation (WWF, later WWE), as a modern, menacing derivative of 19th-century Wild West morticians popularized in classic television westerns. Making his formal debut at Survivor Series in November 1990, the initial version of the character—later dubbed "The Old West Mortician"—was introduced as an emotionless, impervious-to-pain zombie clad in a black trench coat, gray striped tie, stetson hat, and gray funeral gloves.

The underlying premise of the gimmick was "death personified." To ground this grim persona, the character was given a fictional hometown of Death Valley, a signature "Rest in Peace" catchphrase, and an arsenal of funeral-themed aesthetics, including his trademark finishing maneuver, the Tombstone Piledriver (a wrestling pin that forced the opponent to resemble a corpse with their arms crossed over their chest). Through the years, the character underwent numerous evolutions, gradually transforming into a more mythical, supernatural, horror, and later a cult-like figure before shifting entirely into a biker persona. He eventually returned in hybrid form, blending elements of his previous incarnations into one definitive version of The Undertaker character.

== Performance aspects ==
=== The Deadman identity ===
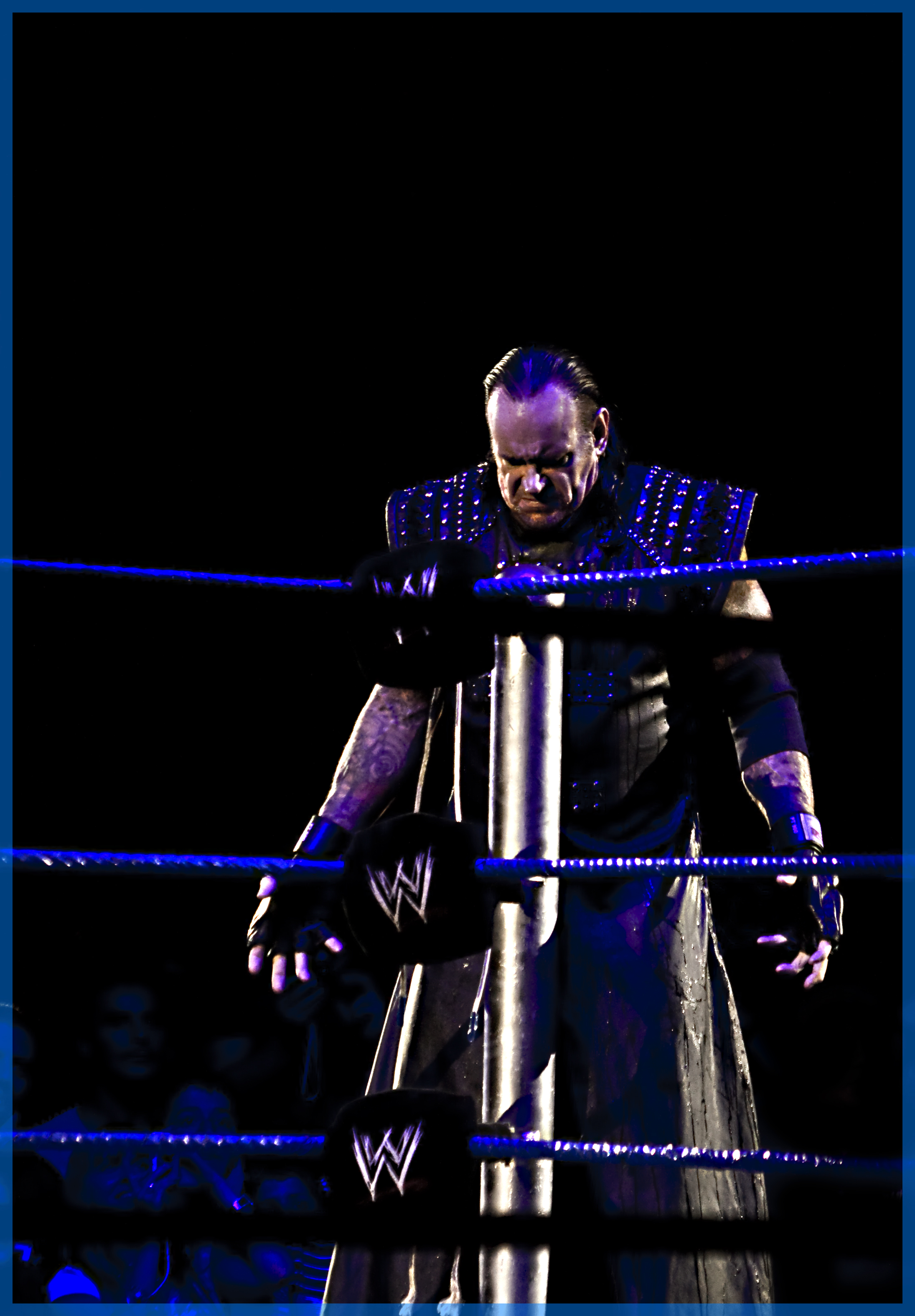
The Undertaker, as his Deadman character, preparing to supernaturally trigger lights back to the arena from raised arms as part of his entrance

Under his undead, funereal, and macabre horror-themed gimmick, in which The Undertaker is subtitled "The Deadman", he routinely took to alarmist tactics to disrupt the focus and confidence of his rivals. Often, these alarmist tactics were morbid and applied the use of props that reflected demise as the consequence of a wrestling match against him: caskets (sometimes personalizing casket designs to represent his opponents), body bags, corpse-like effigies, cemeteries, hearses.

To that end, the gimmick evoked funerals and death down to finer details, such as in the character's birthplace of Death Valley, catchphrase of "Rest in Peace", signature finishing maneuver of the Tombstone Piledriver, a wrestling pin that had the opponent resemble a corpse with their arms crossed over their chest, etc. Adding to his many effects of treating his wrestling matches as funeral services, The Undertaker frequently served a list of specialized matches that were personalized to his Deadman gimmick: Casket Match, Body Bag Match, Buried Alive Match, Last Ride Match, Hell in a Cell, Boneyard Match, etc.

Filled with bells and whistles, The Undertaker's godlike superhuman presence and indignation were signaled by funeral tolls, settings of pitch-black darkness and blue/purple semidarkness, flickering lights, hazy fog, thunder, lightning strikes, and other bone-chilling scenes and sound activity. Portrayed as miraculously resilient to destruction, The Undertaker yielded numerous resurrections, which sometimes gave way to reincarnations of his Deadman gimmick. While maintaining his general character premise as death personified with accompanying alarmist tactics throughout all sagas of the Deadman, each incarnation took on its own distinct appearance and characterization. For example, some Deadman incarnations were unearthly and zombie-like while others were Goth and comparatively more human.

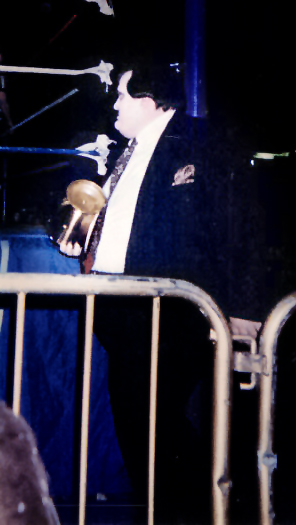
Paul Bearer carrying the Undertaker's iconic urn.

Beginning early on, The Undertaker's persona was complemented with histrionically spooky, wailing manager Paul Bearer, introduced to represent and guide The Deadman. Playing a key role, Bearer used an urn to transmit mysterious powers to The Undertaker that had supernatural healing effects on him during combat. Also linked to The Undertaker's Deadman gimmick were the druids–a team of mysterious, incognito cult-like members, completely disguised in black hooded clergy robes. A mysterious choir chanting sounded whenever the druids presented. The druids typically appeared for the purposes of removing The Undertaker where he had seemingly been extinguished by his enemies (as opposed to EMTs or medical personnel used for the rest of WWF/E talent). The druids were also seen reproducing The Undertaker in recovered, wrathful states to those same enemies who were thought to have extinguished him.

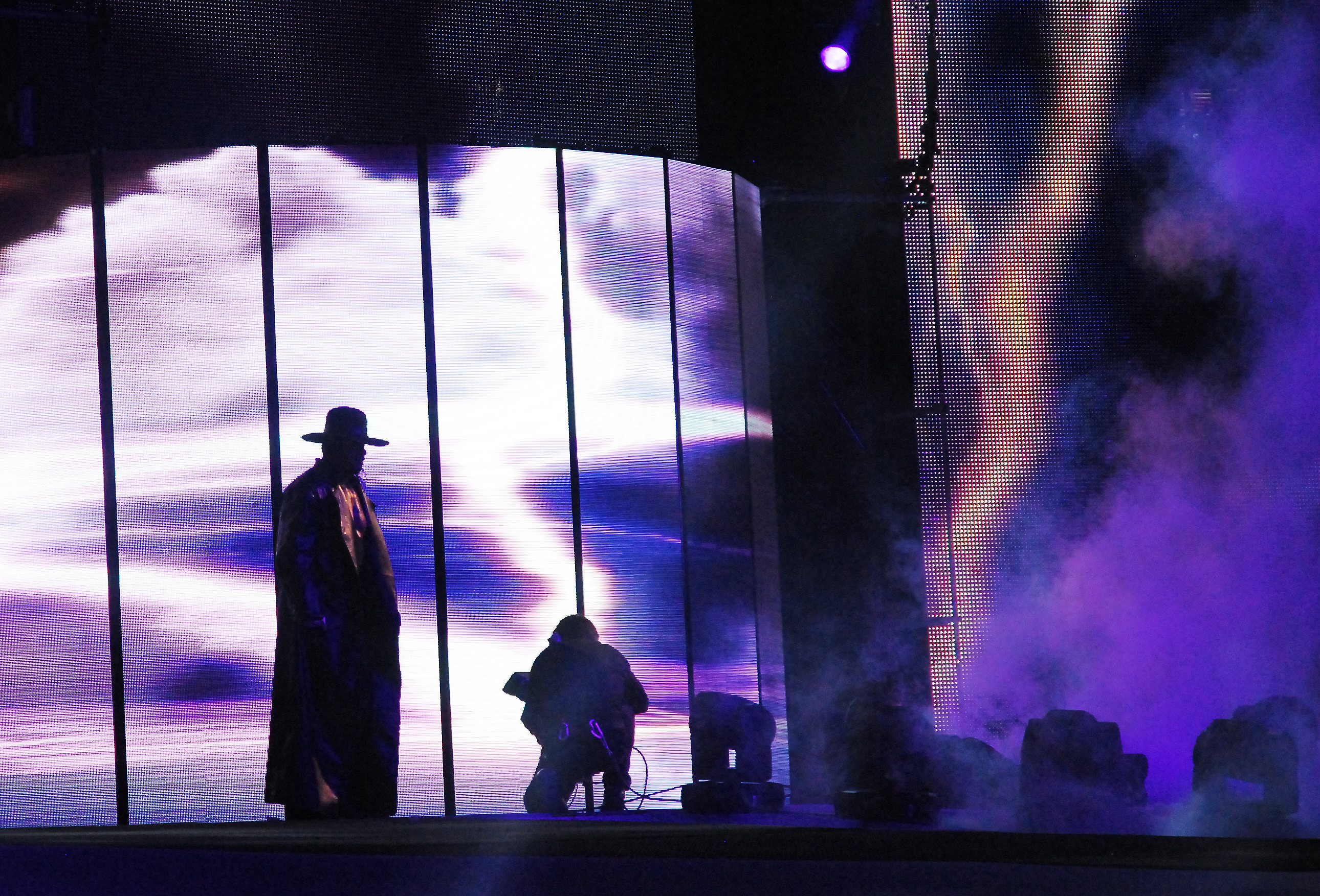
The Undertaker coming to the ring in one of his ominous entrances.

The Undertaker took to many trademarked idiosyncrasies and themes, including a stylized throat-slashing gesture, grimacing facial expressions fit with eyeballs rolled back so that only the whites of his eyes displayed, backwards hair-whips so as to expose his ominous facial expressions, fixed stares on adversaries, protruding tongue displays, jolting of his head with a fury so that it faced the direction of his antagonists, his celebratory take-the-knee pose, sonorous vocalizations, collectively labeling his fanbase as "Creatures of the Night", voice of God-like promos in which things were interrupted with dimmed lights and thunder while The Undertaker's communications were heard booming throughout the arena with no physical trace of him; messages filled with death threats of a deeply posthumous insight into impending corpse decomposition, maggot feasting, unsouling and so on. A main attraction of the Deadman gimmick, The Undertaker mesmerized his opponents and viewers alike through elaborately "bone-chilling" entrances. The character's godlike powers were routinely put on display in these moments, triggering lights back to the arena either gradually or suddenly dependent on his either slowly or abruptly raised arms.

During the vast majority of his wrestling career as the Deadman, The Undertaker used an extended remix of Frédéric Chopin's Funeral March as his theme music. WWF Composer Jim Johnston embellished on the Chopin march, using the historic melody as a pre- and post-chorus to a main chorus of bell tolls, along with an original transition section to the song of a slow, lugubrious instrumental feel. Of his entrances, Calaway has stated, "When that gong went off, that was go time. The music fit the character. That's the key element of it: the end is at hand for whoever's going to be standing in that ring waiting for me to come down. That was the mindset behind the gong. And the music was just doom and gloom, you knew what was coming."

=== Gimmick reflective nicknames ===
The Undertaker generated many nicknames from commentators throughout the course of his active wrestling career, some of those names more associated with his Deadman Undertaker identity, including "The Grim Reaper" (variants of this used were "The Reaper" and "The Reaper of Wayward Souls"), "The Demon of Death Valley", "The Man from the Dark Side", "The Prince of Darkness", "The Lord of Darkness". He also generated nicknames associated with his American Badass Undertaker identity, including "Big Evil" (used in reference to his American Badass heel side), "Booger Red". Some of his nicknames were not identity specific but used for the character in general, such as "The Phenom".

=== Domestic backstory, parents and brother ===
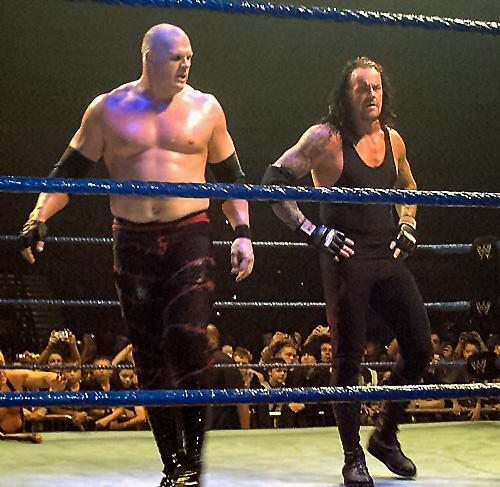
Kane and The Undertaker in 2006

The Undertaker's gimmick has a dark and disturbed family backstory which involves him intentionally burning down his family funeral home as a teenager, resulting in the deaths of his parents and purportedly a brother of his as well. Undertaker initially denied his then ex-manager Paul Bearer's charges of him committing the arson murder of his family, (though later confessed in late 1998). Instead, Undertaker blamed his younger brother of whom he thought long dead from the incident, describing him as a "pyromaniac". This led to Bearer's shocking warnings to proof in the form of the brother, "Kane", as alive and well. In late 1997 at In Your House Badd Blood, Bearer unleashed a vengeful Kane: the fire-personified, juggernaut half-brother of Undertaker, who was fit with a mask to conceal the scarring from Undertaker's arson. In what became a fickle sibling relationship with Bearer (later revealed to be Kane's father) only adding to the pendulum and complexities, Undertaker and Kane went back and forth from one extreme to the other, feuding barbarically at points and yet teaming as the Brothers of Destruction at other points. In the duo's final feud in mid to late 2010, Kane emerged victorious in all of their matches.

=== Gimmick fused with wrestling move set and style ===
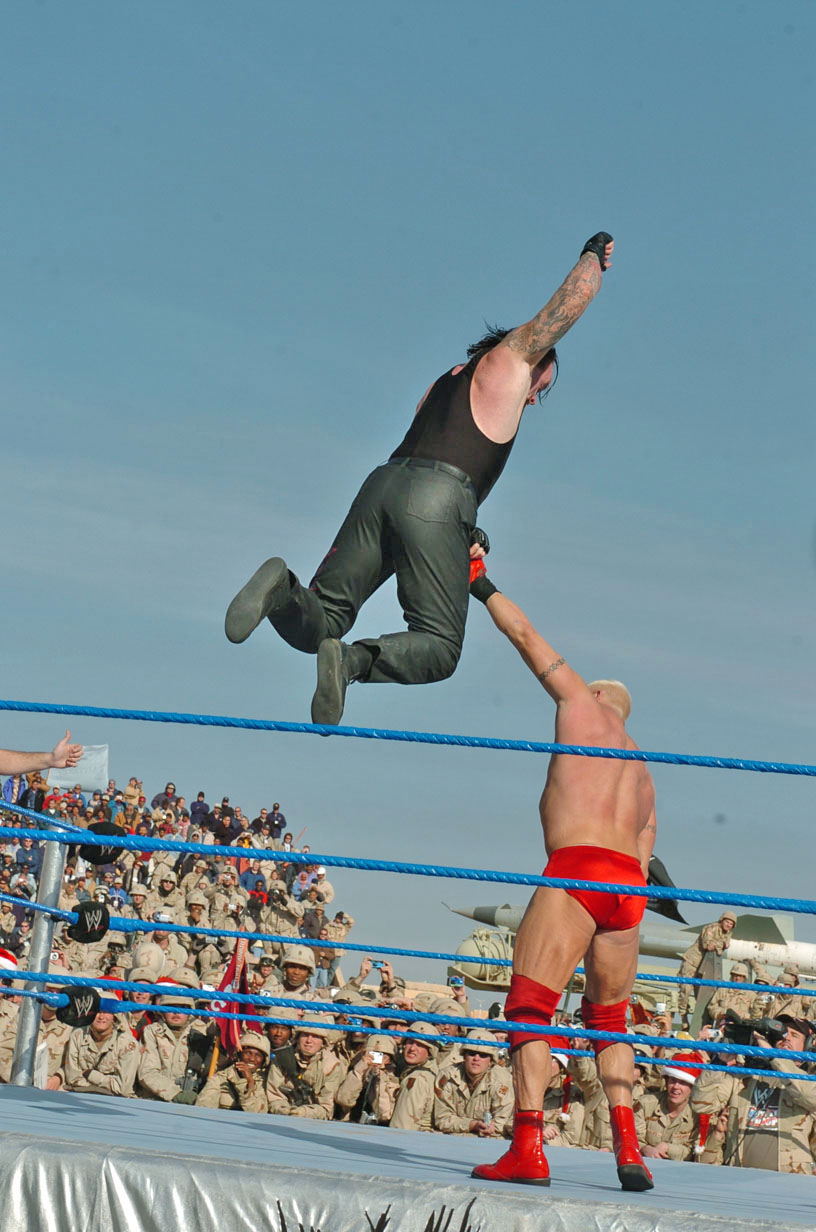
The Undertaker performing "Old School" in 2004.

The Undertaker's wrestling performance and move set were carried out with significant amounts of character-driven physical theater and kinesics. In keeping with his Deadman routine for example, Undertaker was forbiddingly slow and measured in much of his maneuvering and offense. Taking his opponents and audience by surprise, however, he combined his slow, measured physicality with wrestling moves and action uncharacteristic of a wrestler of his vast height and weight. Not limited to just ground offense and power moves, Undertaker was conspicuously aerial, swift, agile, loose-limbed and animated in the other half of his wrestling style and move set: flying clotheslines, guillotine leg drops, running DDTs, ability to land on his feet poised and motionless if thrown from the ring, over-the-top-rope suicide dives (on one occasion, over the top rope and combined active flames during an Inferno match at In Your House Unforgiven), etc. During matches, Undertaker would also pay homage to Don Jardine by performing an arm twist ropewalk chop, dubbed "Old School". According to Calaway, he adopted the Old School from The Spoiler.

=== Calaway's performance of The Deadman ===
Most famed for his Deadman Undertaker identity in particular, the role won Calaway the Wrestling Observer Newsletter awards for Best Gimmick a record-setting 5 years in a row (1990–1994). Calaway was highly protective of his Deadman public image: for the vast majority of his career while performing the gimmick, he was so private that he wasn't seen outside of character in the media. Calaway's approach of presenting only in character publicly was done in order to maintain the mystique of the Deadman and facilitate disbelief suspension. However, during the last few years of his wrestling career, he allowed himself to be seen out of character, giving interviews as Mark Calaway and filming a documentary called The Last Ride.

== Character history and evolution ==
=== Old West Mortician (1990–1994 and March 23, 1997—WrestleMania 13) ===
The earliest of The Undertaker's Deadman incarnations (nicknamed in external media as "The Old West Mortician" to distinguish from his other Deadman incarnations) depicted him as a menacing derivative of the Wild West undertakers in television westerns. In his own rendition, he was garbed in a black trench coat; gray-striped tie; black-ribboned, black stetson; gray boot spats; and gray gloves (black gloves for first few appearances before gray).

This original incarnation emphasized a slow, emotionless, and mortician-like presentation. The Undertaker's movements, facial expressions, and eerie silence helped establish him as a figure who seemed removed from ordinary human behavior. Although this version was not yet as visually supernatural as later versions, it established the funeral imagery, psychological intimidation, and aura of invulnerability that became central to the Deadman gimmick.

The Undertaker would make a special, one-off reappearance under this Old Western Mortician presentation of his Deadman persona at WrestleMania 13, once again donning black with added gray accessories (gloves, boot covers, hatband). Customary of his entrances in this form, a neutral white spot light shined over him during his entrance. In this final appearance, he faced and successfully defeated Sycho Sid for the World Wrestling Federation Championship.

=== Rebirthed Deadman (1994–1996) ===
However, most of The Undertaker's Deadman character development (sleeve tattoos, longer/straightened/black hair, purple/blue color representation, elements of thunder and lightning, etc.) would not surface until his first reincarnation into what was his rebirthed Deadman variation, lasting from SummerSlam 94' (resurrection from a death angle with Yokozuna) through Buried Alive: In Your House (The Undertaker buried alive by Mankind and numerous other WWF heel wrestlers). In these initial zombie-like incarnations of his gimmick, he was portrayed as impervious to pain, something accomplished by Calaway not selling his opponents' attacks. Among the many ways this was showcased was The Undertaker's maneuver of raising up from a taken down supine position into a high Fowler's position, dubbed "the sit-up" (often accompanied by his sharp hissing sound).

This version became heavily associated with purple gloves and boot spats, purple and blue lighting, thunder, lightning, and a more visibly undead presentation. Compared with the Old West Mortician incarnation, the Rebirthed Deadman was more supernatural, more theatrical, and more clearly presented as a resurrected being. The character's disappearances, returns, and no-selling helped make resurrection a recurring part of the Deadman mythology.

=== Lord of Darkness (1996–1998) ===
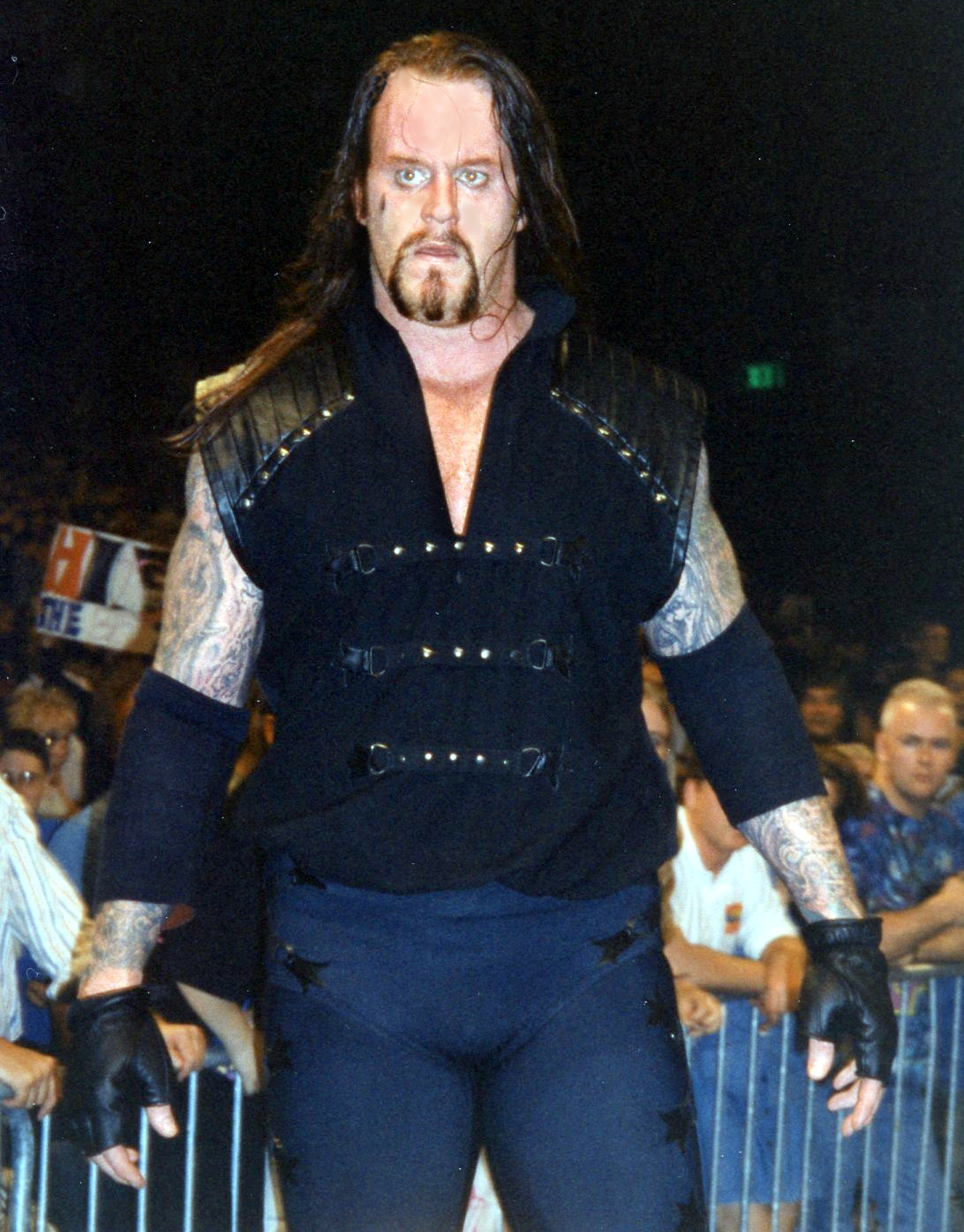
The Undertaker as "Lord of Darkness" Deadman in September 1997

Following the Buried Alive storyline, The Undertaker took on various all-black Goth appearances and persona, with a new found brash, rebelling edge and Championship-driven mean streak (perhaps to better fit in with the then-budding, more adult-oriented Attitude Era). This delivering, dubbed "The Lord of Darkness", was the 3rd incarnation of his Deadman persona. While still rooted in the same death-themed mythology, this variation was less purely zombie-like and more human, menacing, and psychologically intense. Having moved away from the earlier purple accessories (gloves, boot covers, nuances of his coat) from the previous rendition of his Deadman persona, he took toward all-dark attire, heavier gothic imagery, and more vocal expression of himself and his sinister intentions for opponents.

This incarnation also deepened the character's fictional mythology through his connection to Kane, Paul Bearer, and the revelation of The Undertaker's disturbed family backstory. The Lord of Darkness period helped bridge the earlier supernatural Deadman presentation with the later cult-like Ministry of Darkness era.

=== Ministry of Darkness (1998–1999) ===
The Lord of Darkness incarnation eventually evolved into the Ministry of Darkness, one of the darkest and most ritualistic versions of the Deadman gimmick. In this era, The Undertaker was presented less as a solitary undead mortician and more as a demonic leader commanding followers through intimidation, ceremonies, and psychological control. This variation drew heavily on occult-inspired imagery, including druids, chanting, symbolic rituals, and sermon-like promos. He often proclaimed to be invoking and taking orders from a "Higher Power". Moreover, he often appeared in a hooded black robe and sat on a throne with a towering backrest specially designed into his "TX" crucifix-like logo. With the help of his minions, he often performed sacrifices on select WWF wrestlers, using various incantations and magic words with intent to extract out the dark side of the wrestlers in question to recruit them into his Ministry. The completed Ministry of Darkness consisted of The Brood (Christian, Edge and Gangrel), The Acolytes (Bradshaw and Faarooq), Mideon and Viscera.

Unlike earlier versions, which focused mainly on fear, death, and supernatural resilience, the Ministry of Darkness version emphasized corruption, manipulation, and domination. It expanded the Deadman gimmick from an individual horror-themed character into the leader of a larger dark faction, making it one of the most extreme variations of the character during the Attitude Era.

=== The American Badass (2000–2001) ===
After a hiatus, Calaway returned in 2000 adopting a human form of the Undertaker gimmick. Under the character's alter ego, he is a semifictional smack-talking, redneck biker, thoroughly absent of his fully fictional Deadman zombie-like traits and wizardry. In performing this alternate identity, he rode to the ring on motorcycles, chewed tobacco, donned cargo garments and/or denim, printed shirts, and sporty fashion accessories (sunglasses, necklaces, bandanas). His theme music was replaced with popular rock songs of the time, initially Kid Rock's "American Bad Ass" (from which The Undertaker's subtitle used to refer to this second identity derived), and eventually Limp Bizkit's "Rollin' (Air Raid Vehicle)". His American Badass catch phrases, such as threats of “I'll make you famous” or references to the wrestling ring as his “yard”, became popular during this era. According to Bruce Prichard, Calaway requested this metamorphosis of character since he wanted to be "the biker–he wanted to be the guy that he is in everyday life".

While explained off-screen for the above reason years later, Calaway's sudden appearance as American Badass Undertaker after hiatus in which he left off as Deadman Undertaker was never explained within WWE storylines or the WWE's fictional universe. Rather, the expectation was for fans to just go with it.

=== Big Evil (2001–2003) ===
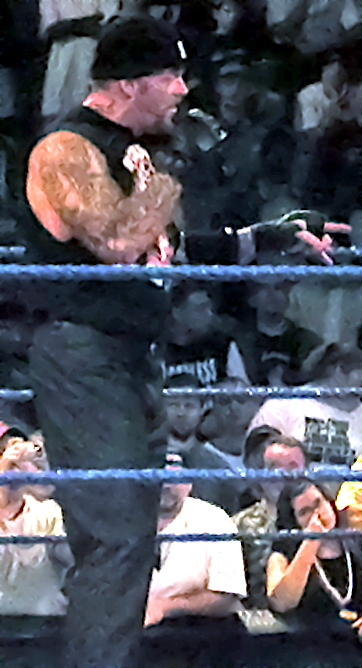
The Undertaker in his "Big Evil" persona

In transitioning his "American Badass" biker identity into a heel, The Undertaker eventually cut his long hair short and went by the nickname "Big Evil". During this incarnation, he was portrayed as a more aggressive, sadistic, and dominant variation of the biker persona, frequently displaying arrogance, intimidation, and a greater willingness to brutalize opponents. Compared to the more rebellious and crowd-pleasing American Badass persona, Big Evil leaned further into villainous behavior and psychological intimidation.

The Big Evil incarnation was also characterized by a more stripped-down and realistic presentation compared to the supernatural theatrics of the Deadman gimmick, although elements of The Undertaker's ominous aura and reputation for destruction remained intact. During this period, The Undertaker often mocked opponents through sarcastic promos and mind games while emphasizing his status as a feared veteran and locker room leader. The character became one of the central heel acts of WWE's early Ruthless Aggression Era.

=== Hybrid Deadman and retirement (2004–2020) ===
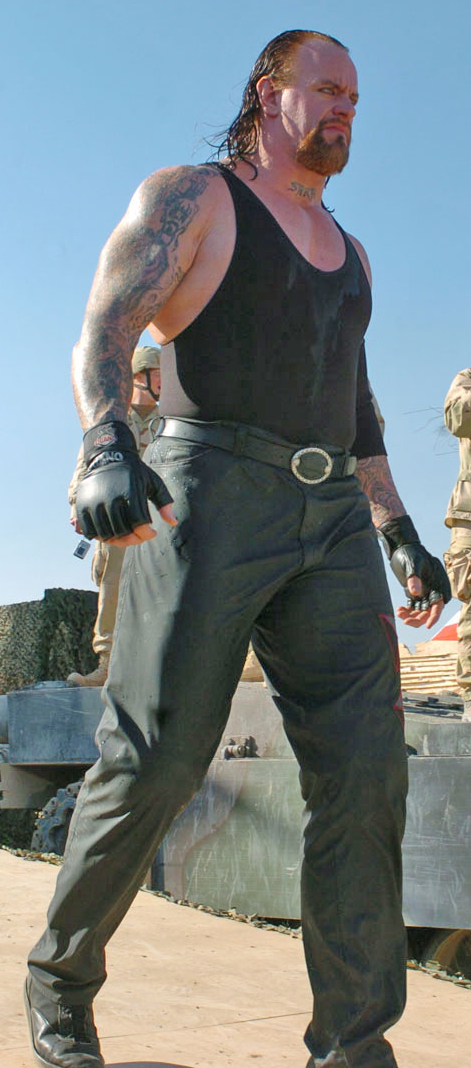
The Undertaker in 2004 as the Deadman, while still maintaining elements of his biker persona.

This transition lasted 3 1/2 years until 2004 when The Undertaker resurrected his Deadman identity in hybrid form—residual features of his American Badass identity remaining. The return of the Deadman was marked by the restoration of many of the character's classic supernatural and gothic elements, including the return of the iconic gong, funeral-themed entrance music, dark arena lighting, druids, lightning effects, and his grim reaper-like black leather trench coat and hat. Unlike previous incarnations of the Deadman gimmick, however, this version blended supernatural presentation with grounded elements carried over from his biker identity.

Among subtle details left over from his biker identity were his in-ring MMA style between his stances, strikes, gloves, and submissions; penchant to sporadically lower his tank top for a barechested appearance; celebrating victories with an arm-raised fist; etc. This incarnation also incorporated more submission-based offense and MMA-inspired combat techniques into The Undertaker's moveset, most notably the Hell's Gate submission hold, while still retaining biker-era maneuvers such as the Last Ride. The character's appearance similarly reflected this hybridization, as The Undertaker initially continued wearing modified versions of his biker attire and ring gear following his 2004 Deadman return before gradually transitioning back toward darker and more traditional Deadman-inspired attire around 2006, including black spandex tights and gothic-style gear more closely associated with his earlier incarnations.

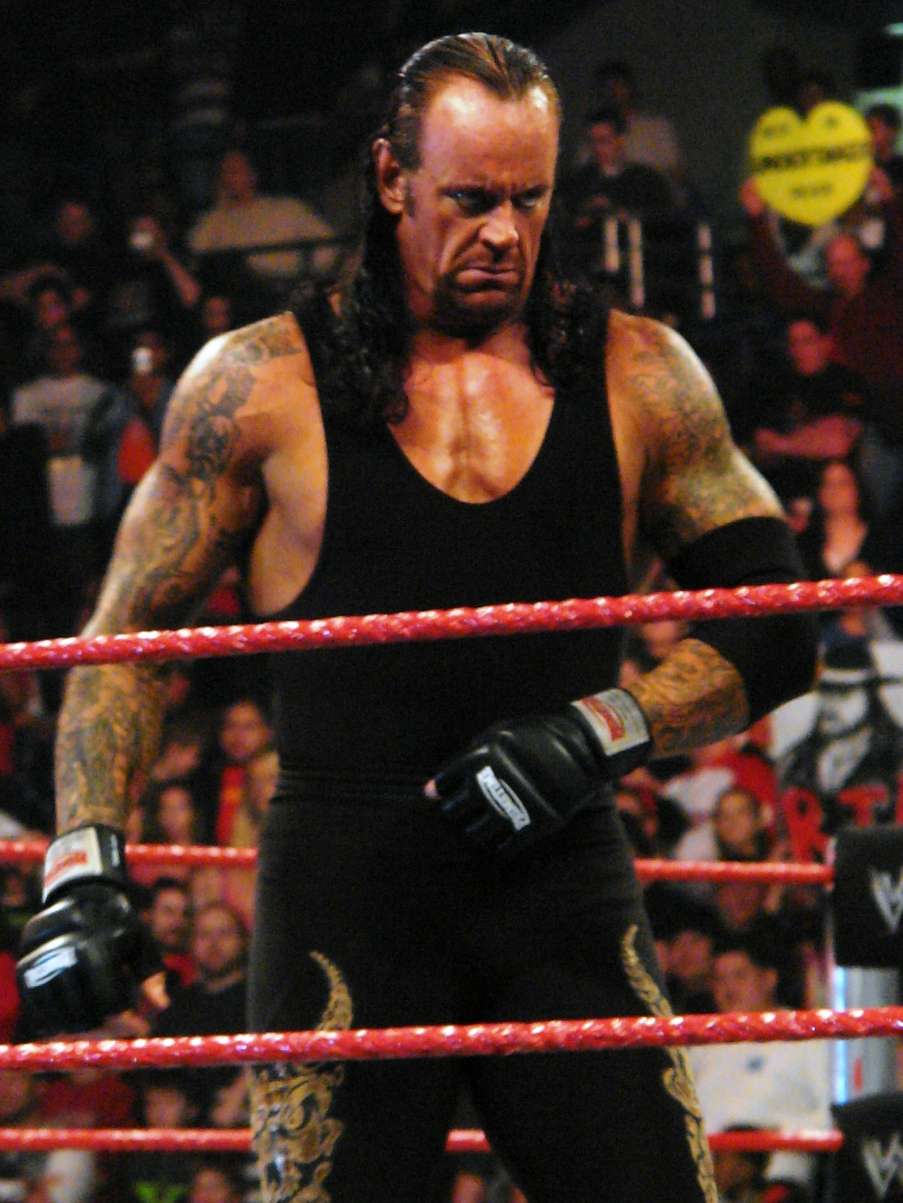
The Undertaker in 2008, depicting the refined final version of his “Deadman” character.

This hybrid Deadman (Deadman incarnation most closely based on Calaway himself) would last many years and for the remainder of The Undertaker's professional wrestling career, excluding his final wrestling match. Compared to the slower and more zombie-like portrayals of the 1990s, this incarnation presented The Undertaker as a more grounded and experienced veteran while still maintaining the supernatural aura, resurrection themes, and death imagery central to the Deadman mythology. The hybrid presentation ultimately became the definitive late-career version of the character and remained largely unchanged throughout the rest of his run.

For The Undertaker's final encounter, a Boneyard Match at WrestleMania 36 in 2020, he introduced a three-dimensional identity that brought all of his identities into one, dubbed "The Unholy Trinity:" a mix of his Deadman identity, American Badass identity, and his natural and genuine identity as Mark Calaway. Following WrestleMania 36, Calaway retired from professional wrestling and frequently began appearing out-of-character.
