= Mummification in the Philippines =

Mummification was practiced in the Philippines until the arrival of the Spanish. The caves containing the mummies were untouched until the 19th century.

The heat and humidity of the islands made mummification difficult to perform in much of the Philippines. However, the widespread practice of mummification existed in Benguet and in the higher and cooler altitudes of the Cordilleras.

Studying the mummies reveals information about the rituals, beliefs, and social structure of the tribes that practiced mummification. For instance, mummification was intended for leaders and individuals that are from the higher social ranks of the tribe.

== Fire Mummies of Kabayan ==
In Northern Luzon, mummification is prevalent in Cordillera, specifically in Benguet, Ifugao, and Mountain Province. The most well-known example are the Fire Mummies in Kabayan, Benguet. There are over 200 remains located in Timbac cave which were made by the Ibaloi tribe between 1200 CE and 1500 CE.

=== Kayaban mummification process ===
The process of Kayaban mummification is unique in that the internal organs are not removed from the corpse as opposed to other traditions of mummification where internal organs are removed, such as Egyptian mummification. Smoking the dead is reportedly practiced more recently by people in Papua New Guinea. This difference has helped generate public interest in the Fire Mummies in the form of tourism to Timbac Cave and various viral internet media on the topic. Under Presidential Decree No. 374., the mummy caves were named Philippine National Cultural Treasures.

There is no written record of the Kabayan mummification process. However, a description of the process has been maintained in Ibaloi oral tradition, despite the cessation of Kayaban mummification occurring centuries ago. The introduction of Christianity is believed to have stopped the practice of mummification, as it goes against Christian beliefs. Despite this, some groups in the Cordillera region still practice the drying of dead bodies, but not the full mummification process.

Only the elite Ibaloi are mummified (the elite class is called Kadangyan) (Balangcod citation). The elite are people who owned vast expanses of land. The higher ranking the individual was within society, the longer the funerary practices and wake lasted before being put in their final resting place. Thus, mummification is a prestigious practice.

The mummification process begins with oral administration of a hypertonic saline solution, commonly known as saltwater, to the dying tribe member. Ingestion of the saline solution acts as a saline laxative by shifting extracellular fluid into the intestinal lumen via osmosis. This laxative effect flushes remaining feces from the colon while causing dehydration which is necessary to the mummification process. Flushing the colon results in a substantial depletion of the gut flora, thus impairing the onset of internal tissue-destructive bacterial enzymatic processes. Furthermore, tissue dehydration helps impair tissue destruction caused by beneficial bacteria which have colonized the person throughout their life The process is identified as being parallel to the Egyptians who placed their corpses in a tub of salt to encourage dehydration.

After death, the corpse is cleansed and rubbed with herbs. Tobacco smoke is then blown into the mouth of the corpse to help dehydrate internal organs and prevent insect infestation. A small fire is lit beside the corpse to enhance dehydration and prevent insect infestation, as insects are a vital component of normal corpse decomposition. The corpse is then secured in Fowler's position, via ceremonial scarves or blankets, to a "death chair". Community elders then remove the epidermis. Finally, juice from the leaves of native plants is applied to the freshly exposed dermis. A fire is lit beneath the corpse to smoke it, while it sits on a death chair or sangadil. Guava branch smoke is preferred. The body fluids drain throughout the process and are collected in a jar (Balangcod citation). The smoking process can last days to months to even a year, depending on how esteemed the person was before their death.

Following completion of the mummification ritual, the corpse is placed in a wooden coffin in the fetal position, sometimes placed in the same coffin as family members, which is buried in a cave. The corpse will then mummify over the course of months or years. Those who look for them are still are able to find century old mummies with intact body parts, tattoos, etc., which means the means of preservation were very effective.

=== Tattooing ===
Mummification in the Philippines provides evidence of tattoo practices in several regions of the Philippines. Many groups of the Igorot in the Cordillera region on the island of Luzon practiced tattooing for centuries. The Central Mountain Provincial Igorots used soot from the bottom of ollas (clay pots) as tattoo pigment.

One method of tattooing used was the ‘puncture/cut and smear’ method, utilized by the Bontoc people. The bu-ma-fa’-tek (tattooist) would first draw the pattern on the skin with ink of soot and water, and then prick the skin with a cha-kay’-yum, and lastly, scatter soot into the open skin and manually work the pigment into the skin with their hands.

The Ibaloi tribe of the Benguet province in Luzon is known for the tattooing found on its artificially mummified bodies. These tattoos include symmetric lined designs that represent elements such as earth and water and cover most of the body. Colors of these tattoos include blue-black as well as tattoos with red pigment.

=== Herbs and Plants ===
In Kabayan, plants were used to preserve and smoke the bodies of the dead but were usually passed down as folklore rather than scientific research. Guava leaves were used to wash the body. Besudak, or embelia Philippinensis has similar properties to vinegar to help preserve meat, and thus in death embalming was used as an extract form to prevent decay. Patani (Phaseolus Lunatus) and diwdiw (Ficus Nota) are antibacterial plants that are also placed around the body before the smoking period, in which guava leaves are kindled to help stop decay and maggots, as well as dry out the body. Tobacco is puffed into the deceased to preserve their organs, though this may be a newer idea after Spanish colonialism around 1500. Since the organs are not removed like in the case of the Egyptians, the dead body is made to ingest a saline solution to dehydrate the body, much like the tobacco smoke.

=== Ursula Cariño Perez's research ===
Ursula Cariño Perez pieced together an intricate description of the process via interviews with Ibaloi members. Perez's unpublished doctoral dissertation is described in the following excerpts from Keith Gabriel's book Kabayan Mummies: A Glimpse of Benguet.

"A large quantity of salt is dissolved in water and poured into the mouth of the deceased to prevent the early decomposition of the internal organs. The corpse is stripped and bathed with cold water. With the Kolebao (death blanket), the corpse in a sitting position is I-asal (tied to the death chair, that has high stilts and that is set in front of and beside the stairs of the house). Soon, the ends of a piece of cloth ban across the mouth is knotted at the back of the chair - further measure to keep the corpse stay on the chair for at least a week or for until such time fluid oozes from the swollen body; in this condition, the corpse is brought down and placed on the floor in a lying position. Close relatives peel off the epidermis or the outer skin all over the body - the process is called Duduan. After being peeled of its skin, the corpse is washed with cold water, covered with the same blanket, and then returned to the death chair. The process is followed by Begisan (deworming), that is removing the worms that infest the skin. The peeled off skin is placed in an earthen jar which is afterwards buried in the yard - this is dug later and placed beside the coffin during the burial. Beginning to dry, the corpse is applied allover with the juice of pounded guava and patani leaves. The process is repeated everyday until the body is totally dry. Regulated heat from a fire built below the death chair smokes the dead. When the body begins to shrink, the position of the corpse is changed by tying the legs and hands up to the chest in a crouched position. The legs and hands are tied. The string is removed only when both hands and legs are in their desired position. When dried, the corpse is placed under the sun during the day and smoked during the night. The juice of patani and guava leaves is applied twice a day until the body is hardened, intact and smoothly dried. For as long as two months or even one year, the body is alternately sun dried and smoked - interment time is decided by the nearest kin and after he has decided, carried to its final resting place in the cave of his ancestors or in another cave..."

Perez adds that "the technique of mummification through salting of the internal organs and application of the juice of guava and patani leaves and smoking and sun-drying lasted up to the 1850s, although it is said to have continued to the end of the century. The practice of mummification was slowly relegated to the past during the last decade of the nineteenth century because the process of mummification was very expensive and time consuming". According to Dr. Perez, "the process primarily depended on the social status of the dead, his wealth and most especially on his number of relatives in neighboring villages who could help shoulder the expenses during the rituals for months or years."

Perez writes further that "the early ancestors of the Ibaloys used a herb called atab to rub on the corpse's body. The leaves of said herb was pounded and extracted of its juice which was wiped on the body to harden it. Patani juice was likewise wiped all over the body to protect it from flies and other insects. Discoverers of the mummies found that the mummies had pieces of cloth plugged in their ears, mouths and nostrils to prevent flies from entering the body."

Informants of Perez said the practice of mummification among their ancestors during the seventeenth century has not been recorded but orally divulged from one generation to another. They claim that up to now, no scientific research has been made to determine the age of the mummies found in the caves of Kabayan, although most foreign anthropologists presume that the mummies are between 500 and 1000 years old.

Due to the mummification process of the dead, features, such as the Tatars, were preserved excellently. Appo Annu, one of the mummies found, had remarkably preserved tattoo details. Studies on the tattoos have been done, and one suggestion was that aside from being a tribal leader, he must have been a hunter. Dr. Analyn Salvador-Amores, from the University of the Philippines-Baguio, states that the patterns were "kin-based and had social and collective meanings among the Ibaloy".

=== Site conservation ===
Many caves throughout the Kabayan region are said to contain Fire Mummies. However, human remains have only been discovered in a handful of these caves. It is suspected that Kabayan locals are unwilling to disclose the actual locations of other mummies due to widespread looting by private collectors and locals. It is alleged that some locals use the nails and fingers of Fire Mummies as talismans.

The mummy of a cherished tribal icon, known as Apo Annu, was stolen from its original resting place in 1918. The mummy was displayed as an exhibit in the Manila circus before being purchased by an antique collector. The mummy was donated to the National Museum in 1984. The National Museum agreed to return the mummy to Nabalicong Village in 1999 under the condition that Benguet officials take steps to protect Apo Annu from potential theft. These protective measures included installing an iron barrier to the opening of his burial cave and appropriation of government funds to maintain the site.

The return Apo Annu was of great cultural significance to the Ibaloi people. As such, an animal sacrificial ceremony was carried out to cleanse the village prior to returning Apo Annu back to his proper resting place. The villagers believed that the return of Annu would bring good fortune and prosperity to the region by lifting an 80-year curse of earthquakes and poor crop yield in the region.

Looting and vandalism of Kabayan burial caves began in the early 1900s and peaked in the 1970s. As of 1999, roughly 80 mummies are believed to be missing from the region. Due to the cultural significance of returning Ibaloi ancestors to their burial caves, the Philippine government and World Monument Watch began site conservation efforts in the 1990s.

The Kabayan Mummy Cave is proclaimed under Presidential Decree No. 327 (PD 327) as part of the Philippine National Cultural Treasures, which states that preservation, protection, and maintenance of the site be ensured for the future generation as a manifestation and ingenuity associated with the religious belief of the Ibaloi culture and tradition.
