= Lloyd-Davies position =

Medical term

Lloyd-Davies position is a medical term referring to a common position for surgical procedures involving the pelvis and lower abdomen. The majority of colorectal and pelvic surgery is conducted with the patient in the Lloyd-Davies position. It was popularised for these procedures by Oswald Lloyd-Davies working at St Marks Hospital London.

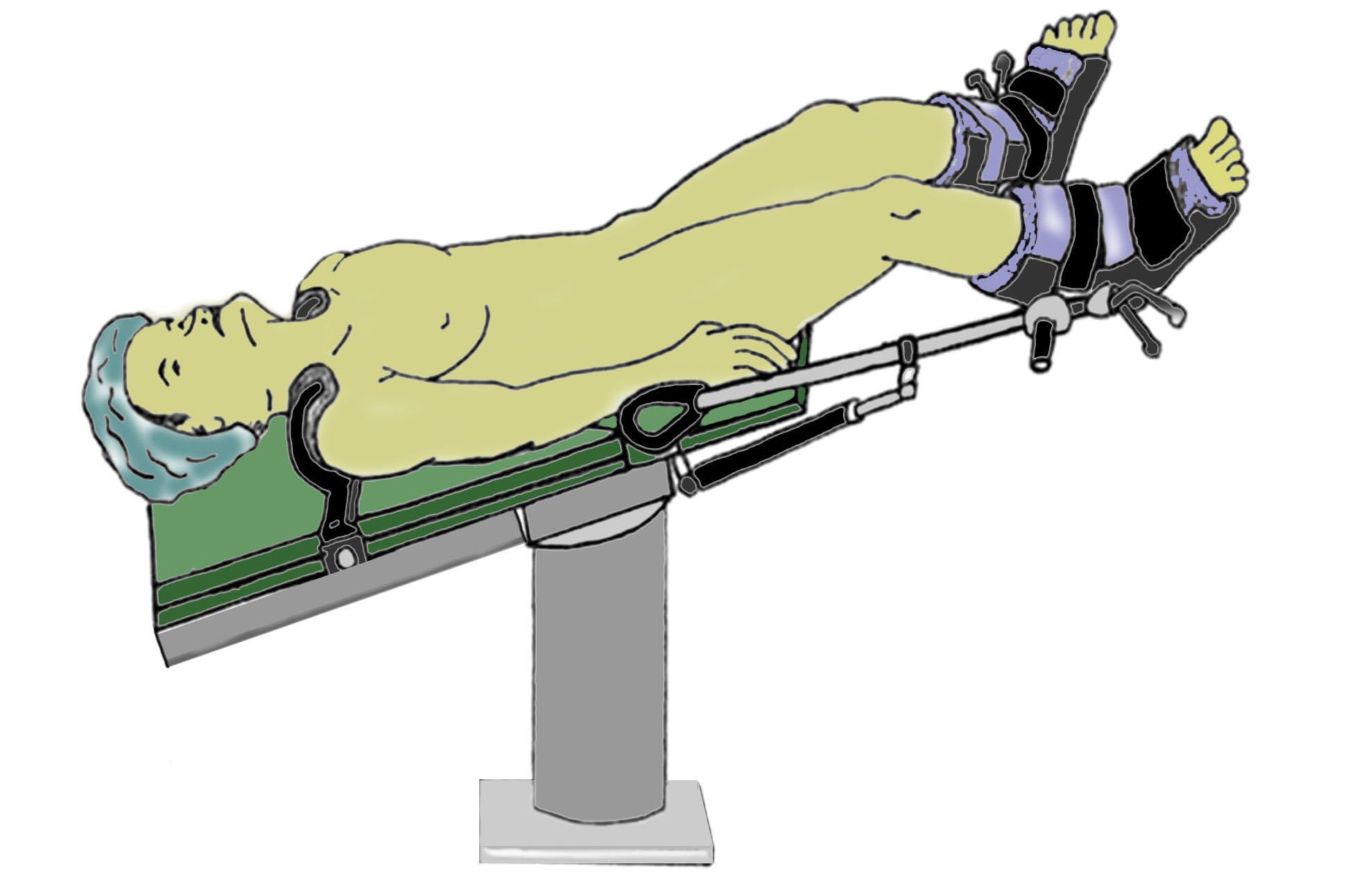
Lloyd-Davies Position

It is derived from the Trendelenburg position but with the legs abducted to allow access to the perineum. The basic angle is a 30-degree Trendelenburg with the hips flexed at 15 degrees; this can be adjusted with leg supports.

== Advantages ==
1. The position gives good exposure and may minimize pressure area damage in longer surgeries.
2. It has fewer neuropathological side effects compared with other positions, notably lithotomy position where the hips are almost fully flexed.

== Disadvantages ==
1. Uncommonly it can precipitate compartment syndrome in muscles of calves after 5 or more hours of surgery.

== See also ==
- Surgical positions
