= George Ryerson Fowler =

American surgeon

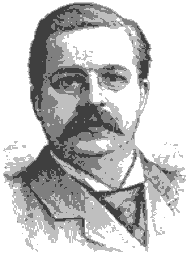
- Born: December 25, 1848; Brooklyn, New York
- Died: February 6, 1906 (aged 57); Albany, New York
- Education: Bellevue Hospital Medical College
- Occupation: Surgeon
- Spouse: Louise R. Wells (m. 1873)

George Ryerson Fowler, M. D. (December 25, 1848 – February 6, 1906), was a surgeon from Brooklyn, New York. He is known for describing Fowler's position, and also for the first thoracoplasty.

== Biography ==
George Ryerson Fowler was born in Brooklyn on December 25, 1848. His parents were Thomas W. Fowler and Sarah Jane F. He graduated from Bellevue Hospital Medical College in 1871, marrying Louise R. Wells in 1873.

At various times he was surgeon-in-chief at Brooklyn City Hospital, amongst other hospitals. In 1884, he was a founder the first president of the Brooklyn Red Cross. For a time he served in the Spanish–American War under General Fitzhugh Lee in the 17th army corps in Havana, where he organized hospitals; he was discharged on the January 31, 1899.

He died in Albany, New York on February 6, 1906.

== Works ==
- Fowler, George R. (1894). A Treatise on Appendicitis. Philadelphia: J. B. Lippincott Company.
