= Rose position =

Type of positioning in surgery

Rose position is a position in which a patient is placed while undergoing a tonsillectomy, adenoidectomy or uvulopalatopharyngoplasty.

== Position ==
In this position both the head and neck are extended. This is done by keeping a sand bag under the supine patient's shoulder blade. For a patient with a kyphosis or a stiff neck, the head piece of the table is raised so that the head ring really does support the head. It is contraindicated in patients with Down syndrome owing to atlanto-axial instability.

== History ==
This position owes its name to a staff nurse named Rose who suggested this position to the surgeon.
