= Mitzvah Technique =

Health-oriented work on musculoskeletal problems and stress diseases

The Mitzvah Technique is focused on dealing with body mechanics in a state of motion. It is a development of the Alexander Technique, the Feldenkrais Method, and health-oriented work on musculoskeletal problems and stress diseases. Each of these techniques is based on correcting common postural faults by addressing the neuromuscular system through postural re-education. The Mitzvah Technique includes a philosophy in addition to its set of procedures. This includes the discipline, exercises, and work that Mitzvah Technique practitioners do with their hands.

== Principles ==
The Mitzvah Technique has been designed as a rehabilitative and self-care discipline. It utilizes body mechanics in the acts of standing, sitting, and walking. The philosophy is that with practice, the discipline becomes integrated into all common activities of daily life.

The Mitzvah Technique is based on the philosophy of the Mitzvah Mechanism. The Mechanism consists of a sequence of natural body movements that magnify the rippling motion in the body. There are four components to the Mitzvah Mechanism. They are as follows:

1. The interplay of physical forces acting between the pelvis and spine,
2. The rippling spinal motion,
3. The dynamic relationship involving the pelvis, spine, and head in a synchronized motion, and
4. The freedom of the head to balance on its spinal support.

The Mitzvah Technique is designed to improve posture and release tension and stress through exercises and therapeutic table work. It claims to realign, rebalance and exercise the entire body during sitting, standing, and walking. It aims to replace long-term work by practitioners by teaching people how to use the Mitzvah Technique themselves. Musicians, actors, and singers have been extensive users.

== The Mitzvah Exercise ==
The Mitzvah Technique contends that activating and practicing the Mitzvah Exercise and mastering its discipline is what corrects faulty posture and, by extension, many of the aches and pains associated with it. The Mitzvah Exercise is a set of movements involving sitting, standing, and walking. The Exercise requires no special equipment other than a chair or stool and space for walking around. The seat should be firm and flat and low enough so that the feet will be flat on the floor when the body is seated. Loose clothing and no shoes are suggested. This is to allow freedom of movement at the hip joint and the transfer of energy through the feet.

The Exercise should be performed under the direction of a suitable Mitzvah Technique teacher and does not substitute for necessary professional health care. It is best described in a booklet prepared by the founder of the Technique, M. Cohen-Nehemia: The Mitzvah Exercise and Its Principle.

The Mitzvah Technique is designed to improve posture and release tension and stress through exercises and therapeutic table work. It is based on the "Mitzvah Mechanism", an upward rippling motion that gently reinforces the body's balance with gravity. It realigns, rebalances and exercises the entire body during sitting, standing and walking. As a result, this mechanism is readily applied to daily activities.

The technique was developed by M. Cohen-Nehemia of Toronto, a Yemeni-Israeli immigrant to Canada. It was originally derived from the Alexander Technique, but has independently developed since the early 1970s.

== History ==
M. Cohen-Nehemia, the originator of the Mitzvah Technique, was born in Jerusalem in 1924. There he studied classical, modern and oriental dance and was a member of the Inbal Dance Theater of Israel. Similar to F. M. Alexander, who lost his voice as an actor and regained it through self-discovery, Nehemia suffered major back problems as a dancer and gained functionality by successfully helping himself through his own experiences and research on body movement. He participated in training seminars for dance and physical education teachers at the kibbutz school which gave him insights into the relationship between body movement and body health.

Nehemia also studied anatomy with Dr. Yitzhak Farine of the Tel-Hashomer government hospital. This resulted in Farine inviting Nehemia to work at the hospital's rehabilitation center. Nehemia was introduced to the Alexander Technique through a course given at the Tel HaShomer Hospital to medical staff, which would influence Nehemia's later work. Together with his wife Malka, they travelled to London where Nehemia spent five years qualifying as an Alexander Teacher at the London School as well as studying at F.M. Alexander's studio. He concomitantly began developing his own version of the Alexander Technique, which he called the Mitzvah Technique to emphasize the rippling motion of the body.

When Nehemia returned to Israel, he assisted Moshe Feldenkrais by introducing the Mitzvah Technique into the Feldenkrais Method. They worked together at the Tel HaShomer Hospital in the physical rehabilitation of wounded Israeli Defense Force soldiers suffering from severe back and spinal injuries. At the same time, Nehemia was taking classes given by Feldenkrais for teachers and actors. As a dancer and Alexander Teacher, Nehemia also spent years observing working bodies in action among animals, children, fellow Inbal dancers and the nomadic Bedouin. Out of these experiences and observations came the fuller development of the Mitzvah Technique, emphasizing the natural rippling motion of the spine.

Nehemia came to Toronto in the late 1960s where he established the Centre for the Alexander Technique that later became the Mitzvah Technique Centre, which has since trained Mitzvah teachers and treated thousands of international clients. Nehemia died on 18 November 2018, at the age of 94 after years of debilitation by a stroke.
