= Trendelenburg position =

Body position lying flat on the back with the feet slightly above the head

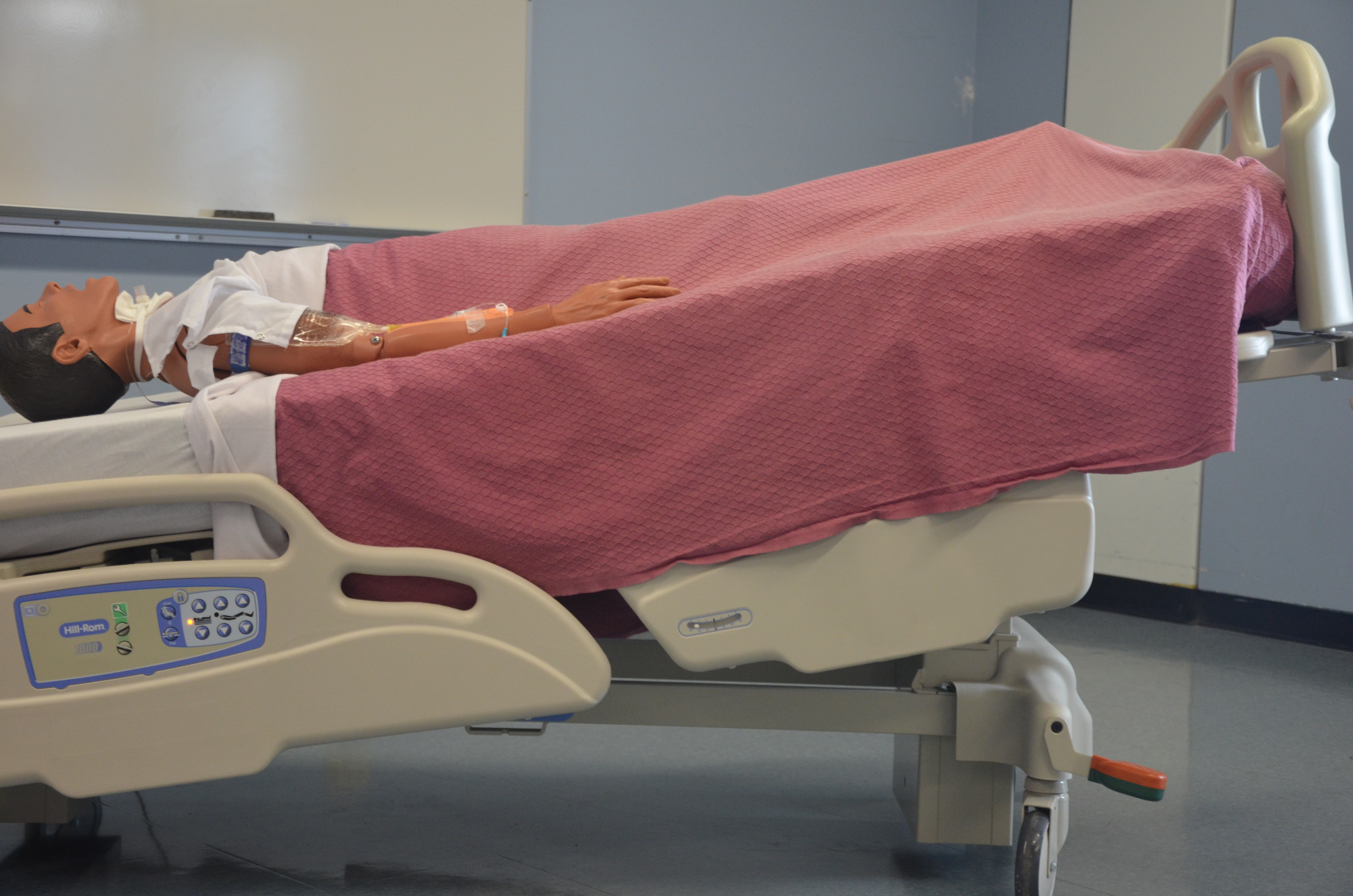
Medical mannequin placed in the Trendelenburg position

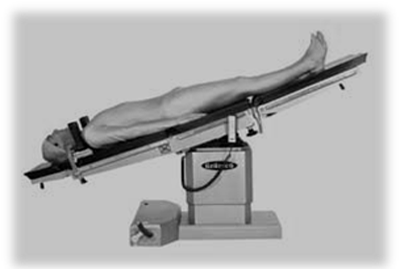
Trendelenburg position

In the Trendelenburg position (/ˈtrɛndələnbɜːrɡ/), the body is lain supine, or flat on the back on a 15–30 degree incline with the feet elevated above the head. The reverse Trendelenburg position, similarly, places the body supine on an incline but with the head now being elevated.

The Trendelenburg position is used in surgery, especially of the abdomen and genitourinary system. It allows better access to the pelvic organs as gravity pulls the intra-abdominal organs away from the pelvis. Evidence does not support its use in hypovolaemic shock, with concerns for negative effects on the lungs and brain.

The position was named for the German surgeon Friedrich Trendelenburg (1844–1924).

== Typical use ==
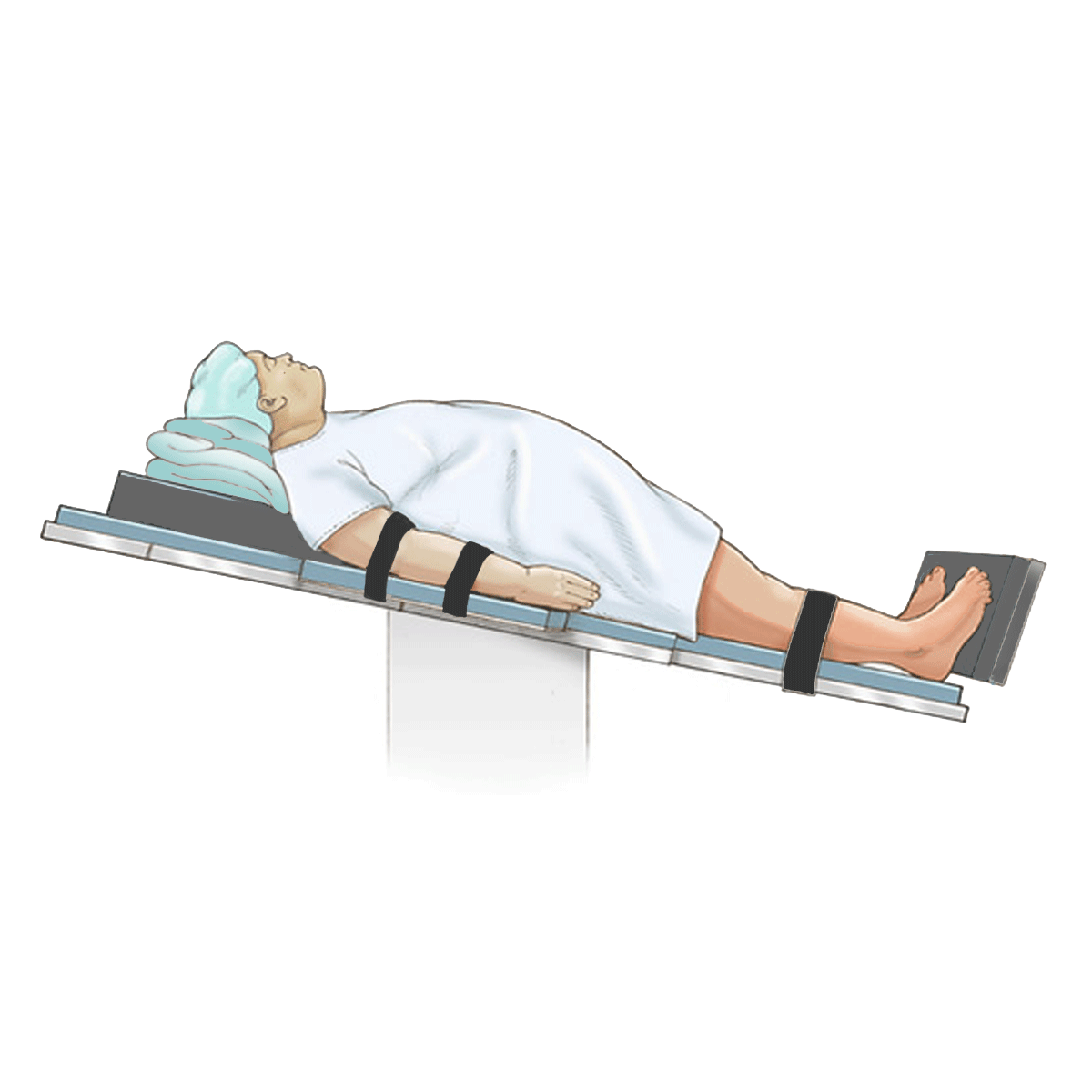
Reverse Trendelenburg

- The Trendelenburg position can be used to treat a venous air embolism by placing the right ventricular outflow tract inferior to the right ventricular cavity, causing the air to migrate superiorly into a position within the right ventricle from which air is less likely to embolise.

Most recently, the reverse Trendelenburg position has been used in minimally invasive glaucoma surgery, also known as MIGS. This position is commonly used for a superior sitting surgeon that uses a combination of downward patient tilt, of approximately 30 to 35 degrees, microscope tilt towards themselves at the same angle and an intraoperative goniolens or prisms that allows them to visualise the inferior trabecular meshwork. Some joysticking of the globe may be required with an appropriate goniolens to bring the meshwork into view.

- The Trendelenburg position along with the Valsalva maneuver, termed as modified-Valsalva maneuver, can also be used for the cardioversion of supraventricular tachycardia.
- The Trendelenburg position is helpful in surgical reduction of an abdominal hernia.
- The Trendelenburg position is also used when placing a central venous catheter in the internal jugular or subclavian vein. The Trendelenburg position uses gravity to assist in the filling and distension of the upper central veins, as well as the external jugular vein. It plays no role in the placement of a femoral central venous catheter.
- The Trendelenburg position can also be used in respiratory patients to create better perfusion.
- The Trendelenburg position has occasionally been used to produce symptomatic relief from septum posticum cysts of the subarachnoid space in the spinal cord, but does not bring about any long-term benefits.
- The Trendelenburg position may be used for drainage images during endoscopic retrograde cholangiopancreatography.
- The Trendelenburg position is reasonable in those with a cord prolapse who are unable to achieve a knee-to-chest position. It is a temporary measure until a cesarean section can be performed.
- If a patient in a Fowler's position or semi-Fowlers position has sunk too far down into the bed, they may temporarily be put in a Trendelenburg position while staff reposition them. This does not have a direct therapeutic action but rather provides a mechanical advantage

== Controversial use ==
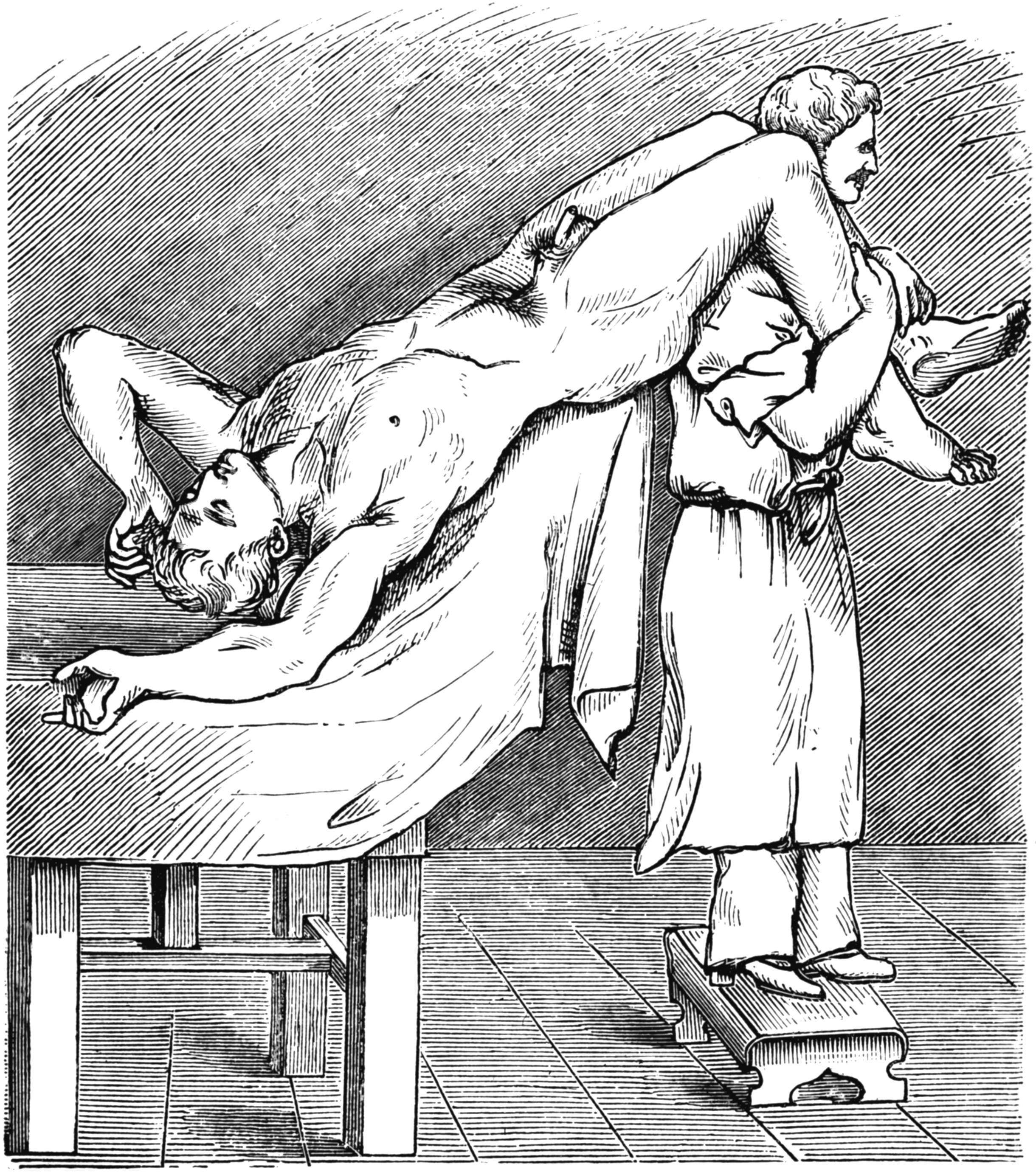
A historic depiction of the Trendelenburg position

- People with hypotension (low blood pressure) have historically been placed in the Trendelenburg position in hopes of increasing blood flow to the brain. A 2005 review found the "Literature on the position was scarce, lacked strength, and seemed to be guided by 'expert opinion.'" A 2008 meta-analysis found adverse consequences to the use of the Trendelenburg position and recommended it be avoided. However, the passive leg raising test is a useful clinical guide to fluid resuscitation and can be used for effective autotransfusion. The Trendelenburg position used to be the standard first aid position for shock.
- The Trendelenburg position can also be used in the treatment of scuba divers with decompression sickness or arterial gas embolism. Many experienced divers still believe this position is appropriate, but scuba first aid professionals no longer advocate elevating the feet higher than the head. The Trendelenburg position in this case increases regurgitation and airway problems, causes the brain to swell, increases breathing difficulty, and has not been proven to be of any value. "Supine is fine" is a good, general rule for victims of submersion injuries unless they have fluid in the airway or are breathing, in which case they should be positioned in the recovery position.

== See also ==
- Fowler's position
- High Fowler's position
- Recovery position
- Semi-Fowler's position
- Trendelenburg gait
- Trendelenburg's sign
