= Fowler's position =

Standard patient position in medicine

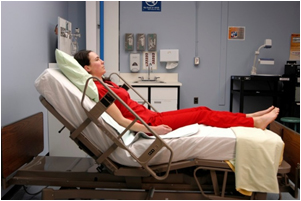
A woman placed in the Fowler's position (in this case, 45 degrees)

In medicine, Fowler's position is a standard patient position in which the patient is seated in a semi-sitting position (45–60 degrees) and may have knees either bent or straight. Variations in the angle are denoted by high Fowler, indicating an upright position at approximately 90 degrees and semi-Fowler, 30 to 45 degrees; and low Fowler, where the head is slightly elevated." It is an intervention used to promote oxygenation via maximum chest expansion and is implemented during events of respiratory distress. Fowler's position facilitates the relaxing of tension of the abdominal muscles, allowing for improved breathing. In immobile patients and infants, the Fowler's position alleviates compression of the chest that occurs due to gravity. Fowler's position increases comfort during eating and other activities, is used in postpartum women to improve uterine drainage, and in infants when signs of respiratory distress are present. Fowler's position is also used when oral or nasal gastric feeding tubes have been implemented as it minimizes the risk of aspiration. Peristalsis and swallowing are aided by the effect of gravitational pull.

It is named for George Ryerson Fowler, who saw it as a way to decrease the mortality of peritonitis: Accumulation of purulent material under the diaphragm led to rapid systemic sepsis and septic shock, whereas pelvic abscesses could be drained through the rectum.

== Semi-Fowler's position ==
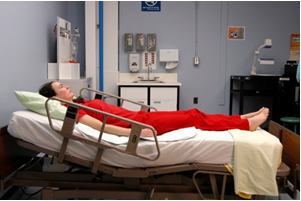
Semi-Fowler's position at 30 degrees

The Semi-Fowler's position is a position in which a patient, typically in a hospital or nursing home in positioned on their back with the head and trunk raised to between 30 and 45 degrees, although 30 degrees is the most frequently used bed angle. The elevation is less than that of the Fowler's position, and may include the foot of the bed being raised at the knee to bend the legs.The position is useful in promoting lung expansion as gravity pulls the diaphragm downward, allowing for expansion and ventilation. It is also recommended during gastric feeding to reduce the risk of regurgitation and aspiration. During childbirth, the semi-Fowler's position is preferred over the full-Fowler's as it is generally more comfortable for the mother, and reduces the need for analgesics and surgical interventions such as operative vaginal delivery or cesarean sections. The semi-Fowler's position is also indicated when assessing the jugular veins.

== High Fowler's position ==
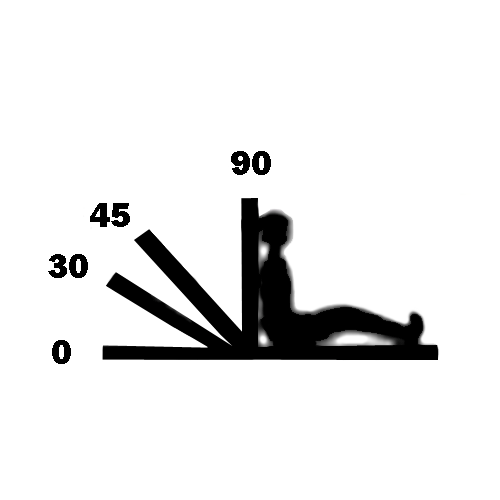
Upright at 90 degrees is full or high Fowler's position. Other Fowler's positions are tilted back.

The high Fowler's position is a position in which a patient, typically in a hospital, is placed when the head of the bed needs to be elevated as high as possible. The upper half of the patient's body is between 60 degrees and 90 degrees in relation to the lower half of their body. The legs of the patient may be straight or bent. This position is also required postoperatively for pneumonectomy patients. This position is known colloquially as "sitting up".

This position is frequently used when feeding a patient (especially one on feeding precautions), for radiology, needing to take a specific type of x-ray at the bedside, (at times) when a breathing treatment is being given to the patient, when the patient is having difficulty breathing, for nasogastric tube insertion, for dependent drainage after abdominal surgery, grooming, etc.

== See also ==
- Lithotomy position
- Trendelenburg position
