= Roger Undy =

British industrial relations scholar (1938–2022)

Roger Undy (2 November 1938 – 18 April 2022) was a British industrial relations scholar and academic.

== Life and career ==
Undy was born on 2 November 1938 in Nottingham into a Labour-supporting, non-conformist, working-class family who were often trade unionists; his father Harold was a fitter and his mother Harriet (née Holmes) was a housewife.

Undy failed the Eleven-plus examination and attended Huntingdon Street secondary modern school before leaving aged 15 to become an apprentice fitter. He worked at the Boots factory in Nottingham from 1954, where he was an active trade unionist (with the Amalgamated Engineering Union), and completed City and Guilds and production engineering qualifications with the support of his employer. He successfully applied for a Trades Union Congress scholarship to Ruskin College, Oxford, and completed a two-year diploma in social studies there in 1969. He then spent three years at Wadham College, Oxford, as an undergraduate, and left with a Bachelor of Arts degree in history and economics in 1972. He then joined the Oxford Centre for Management Studies as a research associate and in 1975 became a research fellow; he was then a fellow in industrial relations from 1977 to 1980 and again from 1983 onward (having been a senior tutor for three years), at the same time that the centre became Templeton College, Oxford. He subsequently served as Dean (1988–91), Vice-President and Acting President (the latter for the 1991–92 year) of the college.

In 1994, he was also appointed a University Lecturer at the Saïd Business School, where he subsequently became a reader in management studies. Undy retired in 2011, but remained with the Saïd Business School as an emeritus reader.

Roger Undy maintained a strong connection to his trade union background throughout much of his life; his father was also an active trade unionist. He supported the Jim Conway Memorial Foundation (JCF), a registered trade union educational charity, by lecturing at its educational courses and participating in its research initiatives and its annual lecture series.

Undy died on 18 April 2022, at the age of 83.

== Publications ==
- Trade Union Merger Strategies (Oxford University Press, 2008).
- (Co-authored with Patricia Fosh, Huw Morris, Paul Smith, and Roderick Martin) Managing the Unions: The Impact of Legislation on Trade Unions' Behaviour (Clarendon Press, 1996).
- (Co-authored with Sid Jennings and William McCarthy) Employee Relations Audits (Routledge, 1990).
- (Co-authored with Roderick Martin) Ballots and Trade Union Democracy (Blackwell, 1984).
- (Co-authored with V. Ellis, William McCarthy, and A. M. Halmos) Change in Trade Unions: The Development of U.K. Unions since the 1960s (Hutchinson, 1981).

Academic offices
Preceded by Tony Rands	Dean, Templeton College, Oxford; 1988–1991	Succeeded by John McGee
Preceded by Uwe Kitzinger	President, Templeton College, Oxford; Acting; 1991–1992	Succeeded by Clark Brundin
