= List of principals of Green Templeton College, Oxford =

A list of Principals of Green Templeton College, Oxford. The head of Green Templeton College, University of Oxford is called the Principal. This article also includes the heads of the predecessor institutions of the college, Green College and Templeton College. The current principal is Sir Michael Dixon, since September 2020.

== Wardens of Green College ==
- Sir Richard Doll (1979–1983)
- John Walton, Baron Walton of Detchant (1983–1989)
- Trevor Hughes (1989–1990); acting Warden
- Sir Crispin Tickell (1990–1997)
- Sir John Hanson (1998–2005)
- Colin Bundy (2006–2008)

== Presidents of Templeton College ==
- 1980–91: Dr Uwe Kitzinger
- 1991–92: Roger Undy (acting)
- 1991–96: Dr Clark Brundin
- 1996–97: Dr Michael von Clemm
- 1998–2002: Sir David Rowland
- 2002–04: Richard Greenhalgh
- 2004–08: Professor Michael Earl

== Principals of Green Templeton College ==
- Colin Bundy (2008–2010)
- Sir David Watson (2010–2015)
- Denise Lievesley (2015–2020)
- Sir Michael Dixon (2020–present)
