= Tufano =

Tufano is a surname. Notable people with the surname include:

- Brian Tufano (1939–2023), English cinematographer
- Dennis Tufano (born 1946), American singer
- Giuseppina Tufano (born 1965), Italian basketball player
- Peter Tufano (born 1957), American academic administrator
