= Bryan Leighton =

English cricketer

Personal information
- Full name: Bryan John Leighton
- Born: December 1996 (age 29); Hereford, Herefordshire, England
- Batting: Right-handed
- Bowling: Right-arm medium

Domestic team information
- Years: Team
- 2018: Oxford University

Career statistics
Competition	First-class
Matches	1
Runs scored	0
Batting average	–
100s/50s	–/–
Top score	–
Balls bowled	156
Wickets	3
Bowling average	26.33
5 wickets in innings	–
10 wickets in match	–
Best bowling	2/42
Catches/stumpings	–/–
- Source: Cricinfo, 25 June 2020

Bryan John Leighton (born December 1996) is an English lawyer and former first-class cricketer.

Leighton was born at Hereford. He later studied at the Saïd Business School at the University of Oxford. While studying at Oxford, he made a single appearance in first-class cricket for Oxford University against Cambridge University in The University Match at Oxford in 2018. Playing as a right-arm medium pace bowler, he took the wickets of Darshan Chohan and Danny Murty in the Cambridge first innings, while in their second innings he took the wicket of Murty once again to claim match figures of 3 for 79.
