= Fer Rivero =

Spanish gymnast, singer

Fernando Rivero
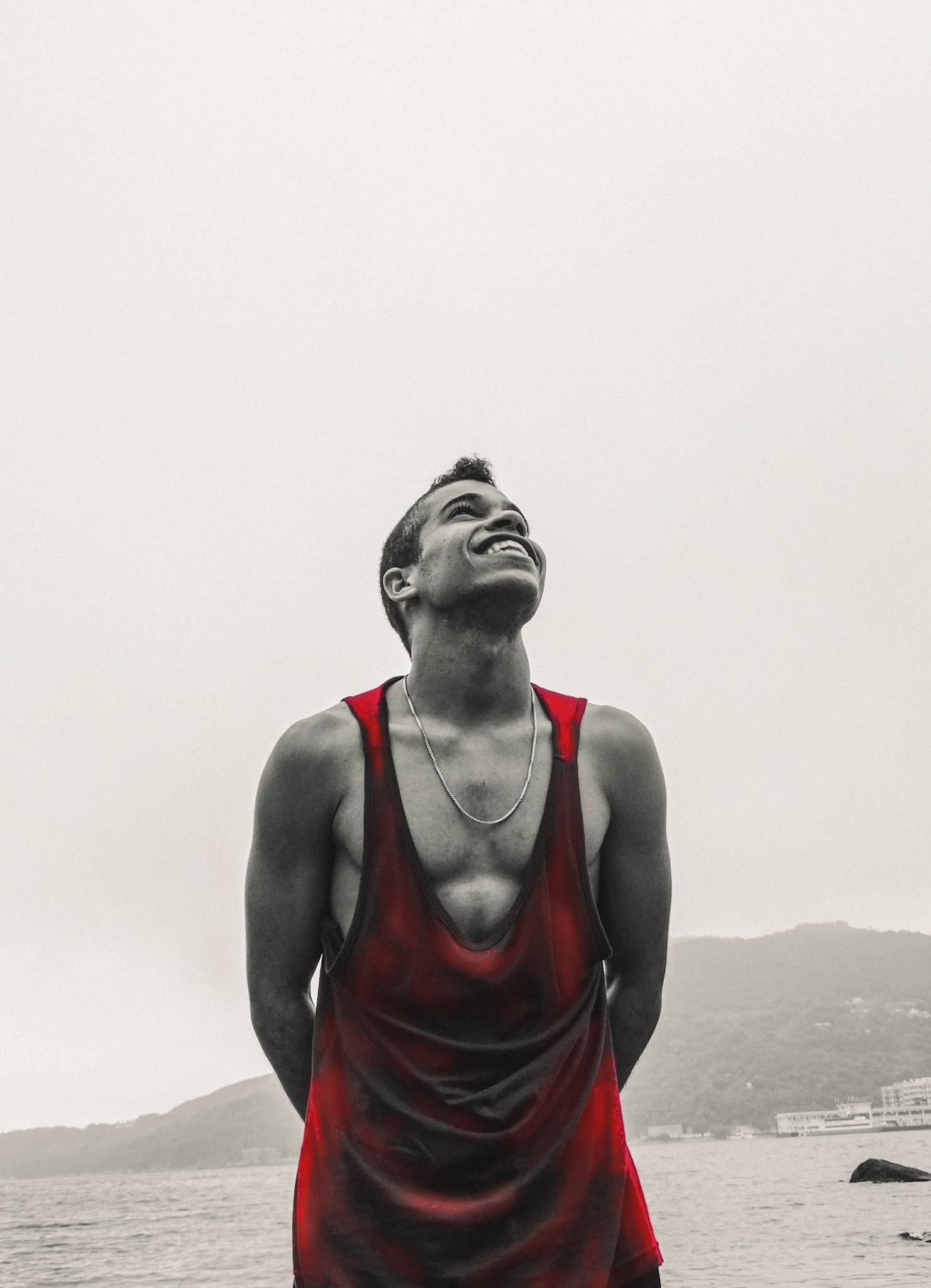

Background information
- Born: July 8, 1992 (age 34); Granada, Spain
- Origin: Granada, Andalusia, Spain
- Genres: RnB, Pop, EDM
- Occupations: Musicians, Singer, Dancer, Gymnast
- Years active: 2008–present
- Label: Independent

Fer Rivero
- Education: The University of Oxford (Oxford Digital Marketing: Disruptive Strategy Program

Fer Rivero is a Singer, Songwriter and Music Producer certified in Marketing by The University of Oxford and Saiid Business School. He is known in the past for his career as a professional dancer, gymnast, teacher and choreographer. He was born and raised in Granada, Spain.

== Career ==
He began his training singing at the school choir at 10 years old, to later begin his acrobatic gymnastics career with 12 y.o. at Club Acrobatos Granada. As a gymnast he achieved the Spanish National Champion 4 years consecutively, 2nd classified internationally and in 2008, with 16 years old, he became 5th of the World at Glasgow's Acrobatic Gymnastics World Championships organised by the FIG.

As a dancer, Fer appeared in several dance TV programs in Spain and the UK ending 4th classified in “Fama, ¡A Bailar!” Season 5 and inside the top 50 in So You Think You Can Dance Series 2. He was guided into dancing by Alicia Saray Frias, choreographer of the Australian National Ballet and the Italian Theater Director Ennio Trinelli, whose company hired him to choreograph two of their biggest festivals; The Walk and Mozart: The Theater Tale).

== Songs ==
Title	Year	Album
Reflection	2015	NA
My World Is Yours	2016	NA
You and I (feat. Apolø)	2016	NA
In Love with You	2016	NA
Light in the Dark	2016	NA
Take the Pain	2016	NA
How Clever is Your Brain	2017	NA
Safe During Night (feat. Apolø)	2017	NA
We Are Music (feat. Apolø)	2018	NA
Tinder Love	2018	NA
Waste My Time	2018	NA
Ain't Nobody Go Home	2018	NA
The One for You (feat. Apolø)	2019	NA
lmma	2019	NA
Open Jam on the Rooftop	2019	NA
Open Jam on the Rooftop (Acoustic)	2020	NA
Gotta Have Flow	2021	NA
El Poder	2021	NA
A Los Ojos	2022	NA
Aura	2022	NA
No More Stops	2024	NA
The Signs	2024	NA
Logical	2024	NA
Nobody Knows	2024	NA
Rather Go	2025	NA
No More Stops (Progressive Extended Version)	2025	NA
Resetter	2025	NA
Don't Lose Me Twice	2025	NA
Cheza Mvua (Under The Rain)	2025	NA
All I Wanted To Say	2025	NA
The Blessed One	2026	
MAYDAY (Gonna See The Lights)	2026	
Late Night Thought	2026	
Right Inside My Head	2026	
Wish I Never Came To This Party	2026	
On Our Soul	2026	
No Caeré	2026	
