= Babble.com =

Online magazine and blog network for parents

- Logo
- Company type: Subsidiary
- Website type: Blog
- Founded: December 2006; 19 years ago
- Dissolved: December 14, 2018; 7 years ago
- Headquarters: Burbank, California, United States
- Area served: Worldwide
- Founders: Rufus Griscom; Alisa Volkman
- Key people: Shalom Auslander; Samantha Bee; Thomas Beller; Claire Diaz Ortiz; Jenny Lawson; Joel Stein; Heather Spohr; Ali Wentworth
- Products: Microblogging
- Parent: Disney Consumer Products and Interactive Media (The Walt Disney Company)
- Website: www.babble.com
- Advertising: Native
- Registration: Optional
- Launched: December 2006; 19 years ago
- Current status: Defunct (2018)

Babble was an online magazine and blog network targeting young, educated, urban parents. Their site operated a large network of parent blogs, employing many bloggers on the subjects of parenting and child-raising.

In early 2019, it was announced that Babble had been shut down.

== History ==
Babble was launched in December 2006 by co-founders Rufus Griscom and Alisa Volkman. After one year, the site grew to half a million readers per month. Babble Media became an independent company in 2009, and was acquired by Disney Interactive Media Group in 2011.

== Reception ==
The American Society of Magazine Editors (ASME) shortlisted Babble for its 2008 "General Excellence Online" award, writing that the "magazine skillfully combines in-depth reporting, thoughtful journalism, a dazzling variety of blog voices and visually arresting, interactive digital features. The result is a smart, hip and endlessly entertaining website that has revolutionized the parenting field."

Time magazine listed Babble.com as one of the 50 Best Websites of 2010, while Forbes named Babble as one of the Top 100 Websites for Women.

Babble's advertising and sponsorship policies came under fire in 2010 and 2011 after several parenting authors and bloggers noted their breastfeeding guide was sponsored by Similac maker Mead Johnson.
