= Mari Sako =

Japanese professor

Mari Sako, FBA (born 1960) is a Japanese-British scholar of business, specialising in global strategy, outsourcing and offshoring, and professional services. She earlier specialised in the economy of Japan and modern Japanese business. Since 1997, she has been Professor of Management Studies at Saïd Business School, University of Oxford. She was a fellow of Templeton College, Oxford from 1997 to 2007, and is now a fellow of New College, Oxford. She previously taught at the London School of Economics and Political Science.

At New College, Sako also sits on the Governing Committee of the Gradel Institute of Charity, founded in 2023.

In 2022, she was elected a Fellow of the British Academy (FBA), the United Kingdom's national academy for the humanities and social sciences.

== Selected works ==
- Dore, Ronald Philip; Sako, Mari (1989). How the Japanese learn to work (1st ed.). London: Routledge. ISBN 978-0415030717.
- Sako, Mari (1992). Prices, quality, and trust: inter-firm relations in Britain and Japan. Cambridge: Cambridge University Press. ISBN 978-0521413862.
- Sako, Mari; Sato, Hiroko, eds. (1997). Japanese labour and management in transition: diversity, flexibility and participation. London: Routledge. ISBN 978-0415114349.
- Dore, Ronald Philip; Sako, Mari (1998). How the Japanese learn to work (2nd ed.). London: Routledge. ISBN 978-0415153454.
- Sako, Mari (2006). Shifting boundaries of the firm: Japanese company - Japanese labour. Oxford New York: Oxford University Press. ISBN 978-0199268160.
