= Roderick Martin =

Roderick Martin may refer to:

- Roderick Martin (athlete) (born 1959), Swedish pentathlete
- Roderick Martin (sociologist) (born 1940), British sociologist
- Rod Martin (1954–2026), American football player
