= PME =

PME may refer to:

== Electronics and computing ==
- Physical Medium Entity, an abstract defined by the IEEE 802.3 standard
- Power Management Event, both a signal sent by a PCI bus and in Wake-on-LAN standard.
- Protective Multiple Earthing, another name for the TN−C−S earthing system
- Particle mesh Ewald, an algorithm used in calculating electrostatic forces in molecular dynamics simulations in computational biology and physics

== Education ==
- Professional Military Education, a term for systems for educating military personnel in the United States
- Professional Master of Education, a type of initial teacher education qualification in Ireland.

== Other ==
- Progressive myoclonus epilepsies, a group of neurodegenerative diseases characterized by myoclonus (erratic muscle twitching)
- Public Market Equivalent, a measure of historical performance of private equity
- Pi Mu Epsilon, a U.S. national mathematics honor-society
- Pacific Mozart Ensemble, the old name of Pacific Edge Voices, a choir in California
- P.M.E., a clerical abbreviation for the members of the Roman Catholic Société des Missions-Étrangères du Québec
