= Heather Spohr =

American blogger and philanthropist (born 1979)

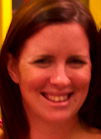
Spohr in 2010

Heather Spohr (born June 27, 1979) is an American blogger and philanthropist whose award-winning blog, The Spohrs Are Multiplying initially became popular as she detailed her family's experiences dealing with a high risk pregnancy, an extended NICU stay, and the difficulties of caring for a premature baby.

== Biography & Career ==
Born and raised in Newbury Park, California, Spohr (née Buchanan) graduated from Newbury Park High School in 1997. She went on to receive a degree in Communication from the University of Southern California in 2000. While at USC she participated in many clubs and organizations, including Delta Gamma sorority.

Prior to beginning her career as a blogger, Spohr worked in A&R for Verve Music Group and as a Sales Executive with the Los Angeles Dodgers.

She is married to writer Michael Spohr with whom she has had three children, Madeline Alice (November 11, 2007 – April 7, 2009), Annabel Violet (born January 22, 2010), and James Asher (born May 30, 2013).

== The Spohrs Are Multiplying ==
Blogging since 2002, Spohr started The Spohrs Are Multiplying in June 2007 in order to keep friends and family informed about her high risk pregnancy with her first daughter, Madeline (her previous blog has since been folded into TSAM). Following Madeline's premature birth, Spohr continued to blog and attracted a growing readership as she detailed the sixty-eight days Madeline spent in the Neonatal Intensive Care Unit, as well happier times once Madeline went home.

Humorous as well as poignant, a post of Spohr's about Madeline's love for NBC's Today Show host Matt Lauer was featured on the msnbc.com website in February 2009.

Madeline died unexpectedly in April 2009 due to complications related to her prematurity. Since then Heather has continued to chronicle her family's story as they journey through grief, and has given a voice to families who have suffered the devastation of losing a child.

The Spohrs Are Multiplying reaches over 560,000 people monthly and has received multiple awards, including top spots with Babble.com and TheBump.com. Spohr and the site have been featured on numerous media outlets, including CNN, The Washington Post, The Huffington Post and WomensHeath.gov among others.

== Friends of Maddie and March of Dimes ==
A fervent supporter of the March of Dimes, Heather is nationally recognized as one of the organization's top fundraisers. She is also the President and Co-Founder of “Friends of Maddie,” a charitable organization that provides financial assistance to families who are suffering financial hardship due to the loss of a child. She has spoken at numerous conferences, on CNN/Headline News, and before members of Congress.

== Other Ventures ==
A regular panelist for the online video series Momversation, Heather is also a featured blogger at Babble.com.
