= Sheila Kitzinger =

British childbirth activist (1929–2015)

Sheila Helena Elizabeth Kitzinger MBE
- Born: 29 March 1929; Taunton, Somerset
- Died: 11 April 2015 (aged 86); Oxfordshire
- Known for: Childbirth Campaigner, Author, Feminist
- Spouse: Uwe Kitzinger
- Children: Celia Kitzinger
- Awards: Royal Anthropological Institute Marsh Award

Sheila Helena Elizabeth Kitzinger MBE (29 March 1929 – 11 April 2015) was a British social anthropologist, natural childbirth activist, and author on childbirth and pregnancy. With over thirty books, her work is considered influential in changing the worldwide culture surrounding childbirth.

== Life and work ==
Kitzinger was born to Alec, a tailor, and Clair Webster in Taunton, Somerset, where she attended the Bishop Fox girls' school. She trained in teaching drama and voice production, but later moved to Oxford to study social anthropology at the Ruskin and St. Hugh's colleges. In 1951, she joined the department of anthropology at the University of Edinburgh, where she researched British race relations. In 1952, she married economist Uwe Kitzinger, and she had her first child four years later in France while her husband was in the diplomatic service.

Kitzinger specialised in pregnancy, childbirth and the parenting of babies and young children. She advocated for women to have the information they needed to make choices about childbirth, and she campaigned against childbirth's medicalisation. She was a well-known advocate for breastfeeding. She joined the advisory board of the National Childbirth Trust (NCT) in 1958 as a teacher and trainer.

In addition to academic posts at the University of Edinburgh and the Open University, Kitzinger was an honorary professor at the University of West London, where she taught the MA in midwifery in the Wolfson School of Health Sciences. She also taught workshops on the social anthropology of birth and breastfeeding. She lectured widely on midwifery education in the USA, Canada, the Caribbean, Israel, Australia, Latin America, South Africa and Japan. Additionally, she was a consultant to the International Childbirth Education Association.

She was a strong believer that all women who are not at high risk should be given the choice of a home birth. Her books cover women's experiences of breastfeeding, antenatal care, birth plans, induction of labour, epidurals, episiotomy, hospital care in childbirth, children's experiences of being present at birth and post traumatic stress following childbirth. Some of her writing was controversial for its time; The Good Birth Guide (1979) may have caused a rift in her relationship with the NCT and she was often at odds with radical feminist views. Her work is considered influential in changing the culture in which women give birth She believed that: "Birth is a major life transition. It is – must be – also a political issue, in terms of the power of the medical system, how it exercises control over women and whether it enables them to make decisions about their own bodies and their babies." She was appointed MBE in 1982 in recognition of her services to education for childbirth.

In 1987, she made an extended appearance on television in the first series of Channel 4's After Dark. From the late 1980s she was series editor for Pandora Press's Issues in Women’s Health; the books in this series included her own The Midwife Challenge, and also Gabrielle Palmer's seminal The Politics of Breastfeeding.

Kitzinger died of cancer in Oxfordshire in 2015 after a short illness. Her autobiography, A Passion for Birth: My Life: Anthropology, Family and Feminism, was published shortly after her death. She has five children; her daughter Celia Kitzinger is a scholar and activist.

== Bibliography ==
- Giving Birth: The Parents' Emotions in Childbirth, Victor Gollancz 1971
- The Good Birth Guide, Croom Helm 1979, ISBN 9780006353140
- The Complete Book of Pregnancy and Childbirth Dorling Kindersley 1980, rev 1989, rev 1996, rev 2004 ISBN 0-679-45028-9 (Knopf US edition)
- Birth Over 30, HarperCollins 1982, ISBN 0-85969-365-1
- Woman's Experience of Sex Penguin 1983
- A Celebration of Birth: The Experience of Childbirth, Penguin 5th ed 1984
- Being Born, Grosset & Dunlap 1986, ISBN 0-448-18990-9
- Your Baby, Your Way, Pantheon Books 1987, ISBN 0-394-75249-X
- Giving Birth, How it Really Feels, Victor Gollancz Ltd 1987, ISBN 0-575-04110-2
- Breastfeeding Your Baby, Dorling Kindersley 1989
- The Crying Baby, Penguin Books 1990, ISBN 0-14-009410-5
- Pregnancy Day by Day: The Expectant Mother's Diary, Record Book, and Guide, Knopf 1990, ISBN 0-394-58751-0
- The Midwife Challenge (Issues in Women's Health series), Pandora Press 1991, ISBN 0-04-440845-5
- Ourselves as Mothers, Bantam 1992, ISBN 0-04-440742-4
- The Year after Childbirth: Surviving and Enjoying the First Year of Motherhood, Scribner 1994, ISBN 0-684-19615-8
- Birth over Thirty-Five, Sheldon Press 1994, ISBN 0-85969-691-X
- Becoming a Grandmother: A Life Transition, Simon & Schuster 1997, ISBN 0-684-19619-0
- Rediscovering Birth, Little, Brown 2000, ISBN 0-316-85393-3, reissued by Pinter & Martin 2011, ISBN 978-1-905177-38-7
- Birth Your Way: Choosing birth at home or in a birth centre, Dorling Kindersley 2002, reissued by Fresh Heart Publishing 2011, ISBN 978-1-906619-18-3
- The New Pregnancy & Childbirth - Choices & Challenges, Dorling Kindersley 2003
- The New Experience of Childbirth, Orion 2004
- The Politics of Birth, Elsevier, USA 2005, ISBN 0-7506-8876-9
- Understanding Your Crying Baby, Carroll & Brown 2005, ISBN 1-904760-21-X
- Improving Maternity Services: Small Is Beautiful - Lessons from a Birth Centre (Foreword), Radcliffe Publishing Ltd 2006, ISBN 1-84619-095-9
- Birth Crisis, Routledge 2006, ISBN 0-415-37266-6
- With Women: Midwives experiences: from shift work to continuity of care, David Vernon 2007
- Birth & Sex: The Power and the Passion, Pinter & Martin 2012, ISBN 9781780660509
- A Passion for Birth: My Life: Anthropology, Family and Feminism, Pinter & Martin 2015, ISBN 9781780661704
