= John Hanson (British diplomat) =

Senior British diplomat, senior executive, historian, and academi

Sir John Hanson KCMG CBE

Director-General, British Council
- In office 1992–1998
- Monarch: Elizabeth II

Warden, Green Templeton College, University of Oxford
- In office 1998–2006
- Monarch: Elizabeth II

Personal details
- Born: 16 November 1938 Sheffield, West Riding of Yorkshire, England
- Died: 13 January 2017 (aged 78)
- Education: University of Oxford, Manchester Grammar School
- Alma mater: Wadham College, Oxford

Sir John Gilbert Hanson KCMG CBE (16 November 1938 – 13 January 2017) was a senior British diplomat, senior executive, historian, and academic.

Hanson was the Director-General of the British Council between 1992 and 1998 where he led a major reform programme for management change throughout the British Council, which is a British organisation specialising in international cultural and educational opportunities. It works in over 100 countries.

Hanson then became the Warden of Green College, University of Oxford from 1998 to 2006. Under his leadership, Green College merged with Templeton College in 2008 to become Green Templeton College, located at what was previously Green College.

Hanson was born in Sheffield. He attended Manchester Grammar School and then Wadham College, Oxford. After graduating, he joined the War Office as fast stream Assistant Principal. He then joined the British Council as a senior diplomat in the field of international affairs, cultural relations and development aid. His diplomatic appointments divided between Britain (Deputy Controller, Education and Science Division, 1972–1975; Controller of the Finance Division, 1979–1982; RCDS, 1983; Deputy Director General, 1988–1992) and abroad in India (1963–66 and again from 1984 to 1988), Lebanon (1966–68), Bahrain (1968–1972) and Tehran (1975–1979).

Hanson received honorary doctorates from three universities. He died on 13 January 2017 at the age of 78 after a short period of ill health.

== Major appointments and Honors (selected) ==
- Director-General, British Council (1992–1998)
- Warden, Green Templeton College, University of Oxford (1998–2006)
- Chair and Trustee, British Skin Foundation (1997–2016)
- Great Gold Medal, Comenius University, Slovakia (1997)
- Hon DLitt, Oxford Brookes University (1995)
- Hon DLitt, Greenwich University (1996)
- Trustee, Charles Wallace Trust (1998–2000)
