= Andrew T. Stephen =

Australian academic

- Born: Brisbane, Australia

Academic background
- Education: Columbia University; University of Queensland
- Thesis: Marketing networks 2.0 (2009)

Academic work
- Discipline: Marketing
- Institutions: University of Oxford; University of Pittsburgh; INSEAD

Andrew Stephen is the L'Oréal Professor of Marketing at Saïd Business School, University of Oxford.
