= William McCarthy, Baron McCarthy =

British politician (1925–2012)

The Right Honourable The Lord McCarthy

Member of the House of Lords
- Lord Temporal
- Life peerage 19 January 1976 – 18 November 2012

Personal details
- Born: 30 July 1925
- Died: 18 November 2012 (aged 87)

William Edward John McCarthy, Baron McCarthy (30 July 1925 – 18 November 2012) was a British Labour politician. McCarthy was a fellow of Nuffield College and Templeton College, Oxford and a specialist in industrial relations. He was created a life peer on 19 January 1976 as Baron McCarthy, of Headington in the City of Oxford. From 1979 to 1997 he was Opposition Spokesperson for Employment. McCarthy was described as "one of Britain’s most influential academics in the field of industrial relations, a painstaking arbiter in the most testing of disputes".

== Background ==
McCarthy was born at the City of London Maternity Hospital on 30 July 1925, and grew up in Islington, London. He attended Holloway County School (now Holloway School). He worked in a gentlemen's outfitter, where he was a representative of the USDAW trade union, which sponsored him to study for a diploma at Ruskin College, Oxford. In 1955 he matriculated at Merton College, Oxford, taking a first class honours degree in philosophy, politics and economics (PPE) in 1957 before going on to read for a DPhil at Nuffield College, Oxford, where he held a research fellowship from 1959 to 1963.

== Career ==
In 1965 he was appointed research director at the Royal Commission on Trade Unions and Employers’ Associations. The commission was established by the Wilson government and led ultimately to the "In Place of Strife" reform proposals of 1969. McCarthy led on a wide range of research projects, including work on the election of shop stewards.

On 19 July 1976, he became a Lord in the British parliament

In 2004 he became a retired member of the British parliament

In 1978 McCarthy arbitrated in a dispute brought by the rail union, ASLEF over bonus payments for the drivers of the high-speed Advanced Passenger Train.

== Personal life and death ==
McCarthy married Margaret Godfrey, and they lived for many years in Old Headington, Oxford. He was a supporter of the British Humanist Association.

McCarthy died from bronchopneumonia at the John Radcliffe Hospital on 18 November 2012, at the age of 87.

== Selected works ==
- The Closed Shop in Britain (1964)
- The Role of Shop Stewards in British Industrial Relations (1966)
- Trade Unions (1972, 1985)
- Coming to Terms with Trade Unions (1973)
- Strikes in Post-War Britain (1983)
- Fairness at Work (1999)
