= Roderick Martin (sociologist) =

British sociologist

Roderick Martin FBAM (born 1940) is a British sociologist and retired academic specialising in industrial relations, management and organisation behaviour.

== Career ==
Born on 18 October 1940, Roderick Martin was educated at the Royal Grammar School in Lancaster and at Balliol College, Oxford. He completed his doctorate at the University of Oxford under the supervision of Hugh Clegg and Philip Williams; his DPhil was awarded in 1965 for his thesis "The National Minority Movement: a study in the organisation of trade union militancy in the inter-war period". A lecturer at the University of York from 1964 to 1966, Martin returned to Oxford as a lecturer in sociology (1966–69) before being elected a fellow and tutor in politics and sociology at Trinity College, Oxford, in 1969. He remained there until 1984, when he was appointed Professor of Industrial Sociology at Imperial College London. In 1988, he moved to Templeton College, Oxford, where he was a fellow, and then in 1992 he became Professor of Organisation Studies and Director of the Glasgow Business School (the latter appointment lasting until 1996). He was subsequently Professor of Organisational Behaviour at the University of Strathclyde, before being appointed Professor of Organisational Behaviour and Director of the School of Management at University of Southampton in 1999. He remained there until 2006, when he became Professor of Management at the Central European University. He retired in 2010. He was a Leverhulme Emeritus Research Fellow for the 2010–11 year, and was elected a Fellow of the British Academy of Management in 2014.

== Publications ==
- Communism and the British Trade Unions, 1924–1933: A Study of the National Minority Movement (Clarendon Press, 1969).
- (Co-edited with Denys E. H. Whiteley) Sociology, Theology, and Conflict (Blackwell, 1969).
- (Co-edited with R. H. Fryer) Redundancy and Paternalist Capitalism (Allen & Unwin, 1973).
- The Sociology of Power (Routledge and Kegan Paul, 1977).
- New Technology and Industrial Relations in Fleet Street (Oxford University Press, 1981).
- (Co-authored with Roger Undy) Ballots and Trade Union Democracy (Basil Blackwell, 1984).
- (Co-authored with Judith Wallace) Working Women in Recession: Employment, Redundancy, and Unemployment (Oxford University Press, 1984).
- Bargaining Power (Clarendon Press, 1992).
- (Co-authored with Patricia Fosh, Huw Morris, Paul Smith, and Roger Undy) Managing the Unions (Clarendon Press, 1996).
- Transforming Management in Central and Eastern Europe (Oxford University Press, 1999).
- (Co-authored with Peter D. Casson and Tahir M. Nisar) Investor Engagement: Investors and Management Practice under Shareholder Value (Oxford University Press, 2007).
- Constructing Capitalisms: Transforming Business Systems in Central and Eastern Europe (Oxford University Press, 2013).
