= Tim Jenkinson =

- Education: University of Cambridge BA (1982); University of Pennsylvania MA (1983); University of Oxford M.Phil. (1985) D.Phil. (1986)
- Occupation: Professor
- Spouse: Rebecca Jenkinson
- Children: Thomas Jenkinson Henry Jenkinson

Tim Jenkinson is Professor of Finance at the Saïd Business School, University of Oxford. His research is on initial public offerings (in particular the analysis of bookbuilding), securitisation and private equity. He teaches the Private Equity course on the MBA, which has been the most popular elective in recent years. He was awarded the Teaching Innovation Award by the 2007 graduating Executive MBA Class for this course.

Jenkinson has written widely on finance and economics, and his work has been published in leading journals, including the Journal of Finance, Review of Financial Studies, Journal of Financial Economics, Journal of Corporate Finance, Economic Journal and the European Economic Review. He is a research fellow of the Centre for Economic Policy Research, a research associate of the European Corporate Governance Institute and managing editor of the Oxford Review of Economic Policy. He is also a director of various companies, including economic consulting firm Oxford Economic Research Associates (Oxera), the leading German utility-switching company Verivox Group, and the UK-listed investment fund PSource Structured Debt (LSE: PSD). He has consulted for a large number of companies, regulators, government agencies and industry associations.

Jenkinson received a bachelor's degree in economics from the University of Cambridge having studied at Churchill College as an undergraduate, a master's degree in economics from the University of Pennsylvania, and a D.Phil. from Oxford. He joined the faculty of the economics department at Oxford University in 1987 and was a visiting professor at Dartmouth College. He joined the Saïd Business School in 2000.

He lives in Oxford with his wife, Rebecca, and two sons Thomas and Henry.
