= Richard Whittington (academic) =

Richard Whittington is an academic in the area of corporate strategy. Currently, he is a professor of strategic management at the Saïd Business School of the University of Oxford, and a Fellow of New College, Oxford. Whittington has been influential in the strategy-as-practice approach, a more sociological and less managerial approach to the study of business and corporate strategy. He was previously an associate editor at the Strategic Management Journal.

At New College, Whittington also sits on the governing committee of the Gradel Institute of Charity, a research institution promoting work on the governance and strategy of third sector organisations.

== Works ==
- Whittington, R. (1996). Strategy as Practice. Long Range Planning, 731-735.
- Whittington, R. (2001). What is Strategy- and does it matter? (2nd ed.). London: Thomson Learning.
- Whittington, R. (2002). Practice Perspectives on Strategy: Unifying and Developing a Field.
- Whittington, R. (2003). "The work of strategizing and organizing: for a practice perspective". Strategic Organization. 1: 117–125.
- Whittington, R. (2004). "Strategy after modernism: recovering practice". European Management Review. 1: 62–68. doi:10.1057/palgrave.emr.1500006.
