= Clark L. Brundin =

British academic administrator (1931–2021)

Clark Lannerdahl Brundin (March 21, 1931 – May 3, 2021) was an American-born academic who was Vice-Chancellor of the University of Warwick, President of Templeton College, and an Oxford councillor.

== Biography ==
Clark Lannerdahl Brundin was born in Los Angeles County, California on March 21, 1931. He moved to the Engineering Department of the University of Oxford in 1957. He was a teacher and researcher (in high altitude aerodynamics) at Oxford, becoming a Fellow and Tutor in Jesus College. From 1985-1992, he was Vice Chancellor of the University of Warwick, returning to Oxford to become the founding director of the Saïd Business School, established in 1992, and was also President of Templeton College.

Brundin was a school governor and a governor of Oxford Polytechnic (now Oxford Brookes University), as well as a non-executive director of Blackwell Science.

Brundin was a Liberal Democrat city councillor from 2004 and was a member of the Audit Committee, the Finance Scrutiny Committee, the Housing Advisory Board and the Strategic Development Control Committee as well as serving on other panels.

Brundin died on May 3, 2021, at the age of 90.

Academic offices
Preceded by Jack Butterworth	Vice-Chancellor of the University of Warwick; 1985–1992	Succeeded by Brian Follett
