= Shawn Baldwin =

American corrupt financier (b.1966)

Shawn D. Baldwin
- Born: February 26, 1966 (age 60); Dayton, Ohio, United States
- Occupation: Financier
- Known for: founding AIA Group (AIA) and Capital Management Group (CMG)
- Website: shawn-baldwin.com

Shawn D. Baldwin (born February 26, 1966) He was the chairman of AIA Group (AIA), an alternative investment firm based in Chicago

== Biography ==
Shawn D. Baldwin (born February 26, 1966)[1] is in federal prison for defrauding investors of $10,000,000 from 2006 to 2017.[2] He was an international financier, trader and investor. He was the chairman of AIA Group (AIA), an alternative investment firm based in Chicago, prior to being indicted for defrauding multiple investors from 2006 to 2017.[3][4]

== Professional career ==
Headquartered in Chicago, Baldwin's Capital Management Group (CMG) was formed through the acquisition of several companies. First, Baldwin acquired in November 2001 MuniDirect, a broker-dealer based in Atlanta, Georgia. In December of that same year, Baldwin bought KCM Capital Management, a broker-dealer based in Anguilla but headquartered in Chicago. He also gained control of the Stature Multi-Allocation Fund, a hedge fund worth $56 million. From 2002 to 2005, CMG participated in over 75 transactions for a par of over $68 billion in equity and debt transactions, which included Google and The Travelers Companies.

== Media coverage and distinctions ==
Baldwin has been profiled in many magazines, including The Economist, BusinessWeek, Forbes, Fortune, Money, and Investment Dealers' Digest, and has appeared on a number of television networks, including Bloomberg, CNN, CNBC, NBC, and CBS. Investment Dealers' Digest named him one of the Top 40 Investment Bankers under 40. In 2006, Baldwin was named one of the Top 75 Blacks on Wall Street by Black Enterprise. He is a contributor to the financial articles of Fast Company and Forbes. In 2006, Baldwin was the financial spokesperson for BlackBerry and the subject of commercials and a print campaign that ran in Forbes, Fortune and BusinessWeek. Baldwin has been also quoted in The Wall Street Journal.
