= Ludovic Phalippou =

French financial economist, consultant, and academic

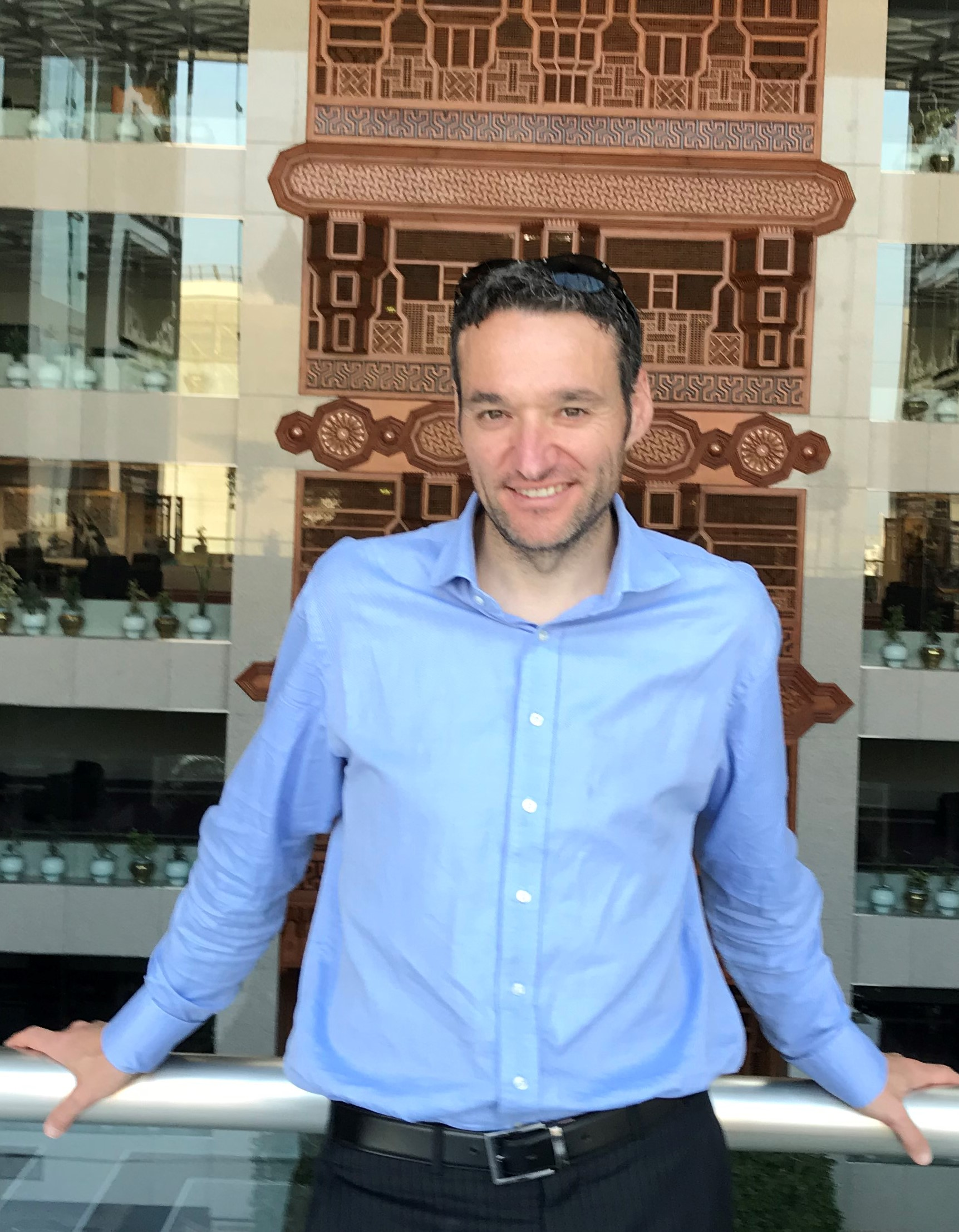
- Ludovic Phalippou
- Born: 5 April 1976 (age 50); France
- Occupations: Financial economist, consultant, academic and researcher

Academic background
- Education: Bachelors in Economics; Masters in Economics; Masters in Mathematical Finance; Ph.D., Finance
- Alma mater: Toulouse School of Economics; University of Southern California; INSEAD Business School
- Website: http://pelaidbare.com/

Ludovic Phalippou is a French financial economist. He is a Professor of Financial Economics and the Academic Area Head of the Finance, Accounting & Economics group at University of Oxford Saïd Business School. Phalippou specializes in the institutional investor related areas of private equity, including risk management, return benchmarking, legal and governance issues, liquidity and measurement of returns. He is the author of the book, Private Equity Laid Bare, now in its third edition, and host a podcast with the same name.

== Education ==
Phalippou grew up on the French countryside on a small farm run by his mother. His father was a baker. He was the first in his family to go to high school and then to go to university. After high school he studied Economics at the Toulouse School of Economics. He received his Bachelor’s degree in Economics from Toulouse School of Economics, France, in 1998. He moved to the USA on a scholarship granted by the University of Southern California as he was enrolled as a PhD student in Economics. He was granted a Master’s degree in Economics and then one in Mathematical Finance. He moved back to France in 2000, starting a PhD in Finance at INSEAD Business School, which he completed in 2004.

== Career ==
Right after his Ph.D., Phalippou moved to Netherlands and joined University of Amsterdam as an assistant professor, promoted to associate professor in 2007. In 2011, he joined Oxford University’s Saïd Business School as an associate professor, obtained tenure five years later, and became a professor of financial economics in 2018. In the following year, Phalippou was appointed as the academic area head of the Finance, Accounting & Economics group of the business school.

Phalippou has worked with several institutional investors on their private equity investment decisions and benchmarking systems, including Norway sovereign wealth fund, Pennsylvania Treasury, Dutch pension funds and with government bodies overseeing public pension fund systems. He was the reviewer for VINNOVA, the Swedish Governmental Agency for Innovation Systems in 2014 and 2017. From 2018 till 2019, Phalippou was the Global Head of private market research at the Blackrock Investment Institute, where he developed a model to forecast private market returns for portfolio optimization programs. He is also a Member of the Investment Committee of Queen’s college endowment.

== Awards and honors ==
- 2019 - Q-group Jack Treynor Prize for best paper

== Bibliography ==
=== Book ===
- Private Equity Laid Bare, 2017 (1st Edition), 2019 (2nd Edition), 2021 (3rd edition).

=== Book chapters ===
- Why is evidence on private equity performance so confusing? in Private Equity Performance Measurement, 2012
- Private Equity Funds Performance, Risk and Selection in Elgar’s Research Handbook on Hedge Funds, 2010
- Risk and Return of Private Equity Investments: An overview in Wiley/Blackwell's Companion to Private Equity, 2009

=== Selected articles ===
- Thirty years after Jensen's prediction: Is private equity a superior form of ownership?, 2020, with P. Morris, Oxford Review of Economic Policy, 36(2): 291-313.
- Private Equity Portfolio Company Fees, with M. Umber and C. Rauch, 2018 Journal of Financial Economics 129(3) p559-585.
- Estimating Private Equity Returns from Limited Partner Cash Flows, with A. Ang, B. Chen, and W. Goetzmann, 2018, Journal of Finance 73(4), p1751-1783.
- On secondary buyouts, 2016, with F. Degeorge and J. Martin, Journal of Financial Economics 120, 124-145.
- Private equity performance and liquidity risk, 2012, with F. Franzoni and E. Novak, Journal of Finance 67(6): 2341-2374.
