= Claire Diaz-Ortiz =

American author and venture capitalist

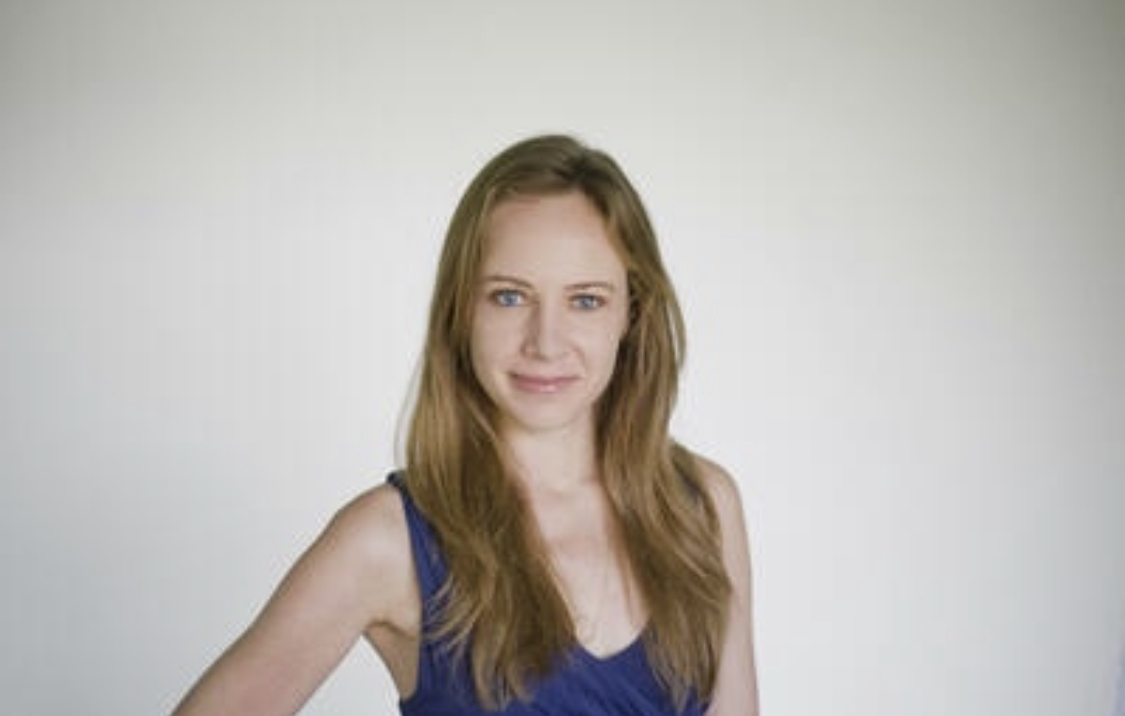
- Born: 1982 (age 43–44)
- Education: Stanford University (BA, MA); University of Oxford (MBA)
- Occupations: Author; venture capitalist
- Father: Lance Williams
- Website: clairediazortiz.com

Claire Diaz-Ortiz (born 1982) is an American author and venture capitalist who was an early employee of Twitter. Hired early on by Twitter co-founder Biz Stone to lead social innovation, she was the first employee to write a book about the platform.

== The Pope ==
Diaz-Ortiz has been called "The Woman Who Got the Pope on Twitter" and "Twitter's Pontiff Recruitment Chief" for her efforts with the Vatican, and can be seen standing by his side when he sent his first tweet. She has also worked with other world leaders.

== Education ==
Diaz-Ortiz earned a BA and MA from Stanford University.

She holds an MBA from Oxford University, where she was a Skoll Foundation Scholar at Oxford's Said Business School, the home of the Skoll Centre for Social Entrepreneurship. The Skoll Foundation Scholarship was started by first ebay president Jeff Skoll and honors social entrepreneurs with a fully funded MBA at Oxford University.

== Awards and recognition ==
Diaz-Ortiz was named "One of the 100 Most Creative People in Business" by Fast Company, and is a Kauffman Fellow for Venture Capital.

== Works ==
Diaz-Ortiz is the author of a number of books, including One Minute Mentoring, which she wrote with legendary management guru Ken Blanchard, which has been translated into many languages. Other books include Social Media Success for Every Brand, and Twitter for Good: Change the World One Tweet at a Time. Her book, Twitter for Good, includes a foreword by Biz Stone.

== Career and Venture Capital ==
Diaz-Ortiz built a following on Twitter when living in an orphanage in Kenya with her non-profit organization. That story is chronicled in her book Hope Runs: An American Tourist, A Kenyan Boy, a Journey of Redemption. She then joined Twitter as an early employee. Later, she became a venture capitalist. She is an advocate for diversity in venture capital and stepped in for a pregnant woman founder she invested in to make the case for parental leave. She is very active in Latin America has made the case for women in web3 in Argentina.

== Personal life and live-tweeting birth ==
Diaz-Ortiz lives in Buenos Aires. She is the daughter of investigative journalist Lance Williams, winner of two George Polk Awards and NYT bestselling author of Game of Shadows. In 2014 Diaz-Ortiz became the first person to live-tweet the birth of a child, a story that went viral around the world and landed her on the homepage of Yahoo.
