= Peter Tufano =

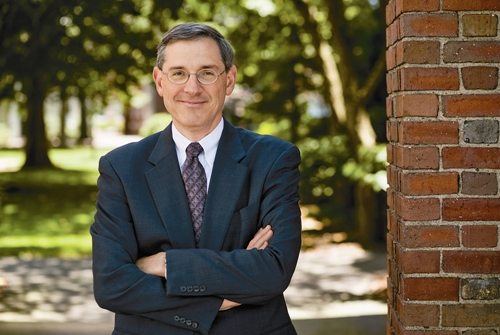
- Born: 1957 (age 68–69); Monticello, New York
- Education: Harvard University; AB (1979), MBA (1984), PhD (1989)
- Occupations: Professor; Administrator

Peter Tufano (born 1957) was the dean of the Saïd Business School at the University of Oxford until 2021 before being replaced by Sue Dopson as interim acting dean. Before moving to Oxford in 2011, he spent over three decades at Harvard University where he completed his BA in Economics, MBA and PhD in Business Economics, as well as spending 22 years on the faculty.

== Biography ==
Tufano graduated from Harvard University where he obtained his AB (1979), MBA (1984) and PhD (1989) degrees. His academic research has primarily been focused around consumer finance, where he has been at the forefront of advancing the academic field. His work is credited with influencing two US policy initiatives and a new class of savings products in the US. His other streams of work deal with risk management, financial engineering, and mutual funds.

He was announced as the next dean of the Saïd Business School in late 2010 and took on the position on 1 July 2011.

The school's current Financial Times MBA global ranking is 21 as of 2020, representing an 8 place drop from the prior year. The school's current QS GLobal MBA Ranking is 16 as of 2020, representing a drop of 4 from the prior year. Open enrolment Executive Education is ranked 1 in the UK and 2 globally by the Financial Times. Tufano believes that rankings only paint part of the picture of a business school and under represent the school's diversity and strengths in entrepreneurship and social enterprise. Tufano has recently lauded his accomplishments in attracting more women and Africans to the program, quoting "they are amazing".

On August 22, 2020, it was announced that he would step down as the dean of Saïd Business School. Over the course of his nine year tenure, the school went up six places in the FT rankings, which was quoted as "significant" and has not moved from its ninth place on the Poet and Quants composite list of best international programs.

As of September 2025, Tufano is a Baker Foundation Professor at Harvard Business School and Senior Advisor to the Harvard Salata Institute for Climate and Sustainability.

== Academics ==
Tufano developed over 50 case studies and created three new MBA courses at Harvard. He has also offered versions of these courses in various Executive Education programmes.
