= Uwe Kitzinger =

British economist (1928–2023)

Uwe Kitzinger, CBE (12 April 1928 – 16 May 2023) was a German-born British academic who specialised in international relations. He was the first British economist at the Council of Europe in Strasbourg from 1951 to 1956, and in January 1973 to June 1975 Political Adviser to the first British Vice-President of the European Commission in Brussels, who was charged with External Relations.

== Early life ==
Born in Nuremberg on 12 April 1928, Uwe Kitzinger came to Britain as a refugee in July 1939 and was educated at Watford Grammar School for Boys, Balliol College and New College, Oxford, where he was elected President of the Oxford Union and took a First in PPE.

== Career ==
At the Council of Europe, he worked on European economic integration including preparations for the Messina Conference, and in 1956, when Britain declined to join the European Economic Community, he returned to Oxford as Ford Research Fellow in European Politics (and later Investment Bursar) of Nuffield College. He started his lectures on the Rome Treaties five weeks after they were signed, wrote half a dozen books on European integration, founded the Journal of Common Market Studies, and campaigned on television and in the press for Britain to join the European Communities. He also worked abroad as a visiting professor in the West Indies, at Paris and at Harvard.

In 1976, he resigned his Nuffield Fellowship to become Dean of INSEAD, the European Institute for Business Management in Fontainebleau, where he encouraged research, particularly into the effects of cultural diversity on European and international management practice. In the 1980 Birthday Honours, he was appointed a Commander of the Order of the British Empire (CBE) for services to British academic interests in France, on the Diplomatic Service & Overseas List.

Appointed director of the Oxford Centre for Management Studies, he championed the recognition of Management as a proper subject to be taught at Oxford at post-graduate and post-experience levels, negotiated the Templeton Benefaction, and, in 1984, became the first president of Templeton College, Oxford, which specialised in Management Studies. (In 2008, Templeton merged with Green College to become Green Templeton College, of which he was an Honorary Fellow.) From 1993 to 2003, he was back at Harvard as a visiting scholar working on Macro-Projects, Conflict Management and Negotiation.

Kitzinger served for various periods on the Councils of Chatham House, the European Movement, the Major Projects Association, Oxfam, the British Alliance Francaise, Asylum Welcome and other voluntary bodies. With his wife and daughters in 1991 he started "Lentils for Dubrovnik" to transport essential supplies to refugees fleeing from the atrocities in the former Yugoslavia, and, from 2003 to 2012, chaired a campaign to teach the practice of civil courage in the region.

== Personal life and death ==
In 1952, he married Sheila (nee Webster), who studied social anthropology at Oxford and became an international reformer of birthing practices until her death in 2015. They had five daughters, Celia, Nell, Tess (now McKenney), Polly, and Jenny Kitzinger.

Uwe Kitzinger died from a heart attack on 16 May 2023, at the age of 95.

== Works ==
- German Electoral Politics (1960).
- The Challenge of the Common Market (1961).
- The Politics and Economics of European Integration (1963).
- Britain, Europe and Beyond (1964).
- The Second Try (1968).
- Diplomacy and Persuasion (1973).
- (with David Butler) The 1975 Referendum (1976).
- (with Ernst Frankel) Macro-Engineering and the Earth (1998).

His articles, broadcasts, unpublished papers and his library on Britain’s relations with the European Communities 1946-1976 are deposited in the Historical Archives of the European Union in Florence - see http://archives.eui.eu/en/fonds/104085?itemUWK/NS/DOC.

== Sources ==
- Who’s Who in the World, etc, College websites, Financial Times, etc,
- Robert Taylor, Nuffield College Memories
- INSEAD, From Inspiration to Institution, esp. “The Caped Crusader”
- Desmond Graves, OCMS-A Family Affair, esp. “The Kitzinger Years”
- R.T. Tricker, Oxford Circus, esp. “The Kitzinger Years”
- Sheila Kitzinger, A Passion for Birth (2015)
