= Saïd Business School =

Business school of the University of Oxford

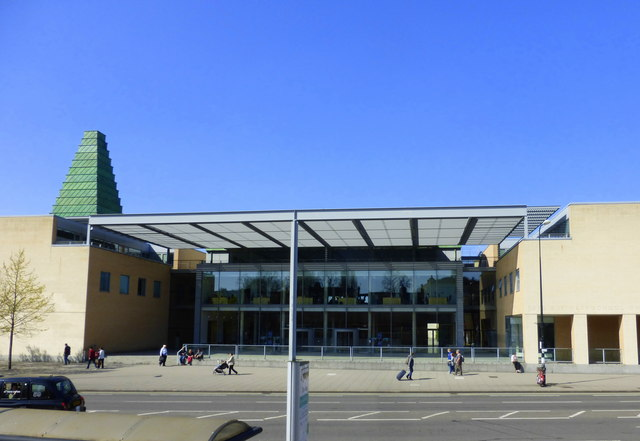
- Other names: Oxford Saïd, SBS
- Type: Business school
- Established: School of Management Studies 1990, re-branded 1996
- Parent institution: University of Oxford
- Accreditation: AACSB · EQUIS
- Dean: Mette Morsing
- Academic staff: 90
- Undergraduates: 300
- Postgraduates: 354 MBA; 240 EMBA; 80 MFE; 30 MGHL; 50 MLF; 120 MMPM
- Doctoral students: 50
- Location: Oxford, England
- Website: www.sbs.ox.ac.uk

Saïd Business School (Oxford Saïd or SBS) is the business school at the Social Sciences Division of the University of Oxford in Oxford, England.

Business and management classes started at Oxford in 1965 when the Centre of Management Studies, later relaunched as Templeton College, Oxford, was founded. In 1988, a committee chaired by Claus Moser, Baron Moser recommended that the University create a new School of Management Studies. By 1990, Clark L. Brundin became founding director of Oxford's school of management studies. In 1996, the school re-branded as Saïd Business School after a donation of £28 million from Wafic Saïd. New premises were built on Park End Street and opened in 2001. The Thatcher Business Education Centre was opened on the same site in 2012 after a further donation from Saïd. The School has another centre at Egrove Park, on the former site of Templeton College, and in 2019 acquired an old power station in Osney to convert into a Global Leadership Centre.

Saïd Business School is the University of Oxford's department for graduate students in business, management and finance. Undergraduates are also taught as part of the Economics and Management course together with the Economics Department.

As of September 2025, Professor Mette Morsing was appointed Interim Dean following the resignation of Professor Soumitra Dutta over allegations of harassment made by a female colleague.

== History ==
Business education at the University of Oxford dates back to 1965, when the Oxford Centre for Management Studies was founded. The centre was renamed Templeton College in 1983 as a result of a donation from Sir John Templeton.

In 1988, a committee chaired by Sir Claus Moser (warden of Wadham College) recommended that the University set up a new School of Management Studies. The University agreed to establish a Business School in 1990 and the Oxford School of Management Studies was set up in premises at the Old Radcliffe Infirmary with its first intake of students arriving in 1993. The first director was Dr Clark Brundin, who had been the vice-chancellor of the University of Warwick since 1985. He was also appointed as president of Templeton College.

Saïd Business School was founded in 1996 when Syrian-born businessman Wafic Saïd offered the University a donation of £28 million. A site for the new premises was found on Park End Street, opposite Oxford railway station, on land formerly occupied by Oxford Rewley Road railway station. The building was designed by Edward Jones and Sir Jeremy Dixon. The opening on 5 November 2001 was accompanied by a demonstration by students concerned about the controversial nature of Wafic Saïd's donation. Saïd was linked with the UK's signing of the Al-Yamamah arms deal.

In 2007, Templeton College merged with Green College to form Green Templeton College, based on the existing Green College site. The former Templeton site at Egrove Park then became the Saïd Business School Executive Education Centre. In 2012 the Thatcher Business Education Centre, financed by a donation from Saïd, was opened on the Park End Street site. Saïd donated a further £15 million in 2019 to finance the conversion of the old Osney power station into a Global Leadership Centre.

In 2020, Saïd Business School lost an employment tribunal case brought by its former director of custom executive education. The tribunal found that the whistleblower had been unfairly dismissed and awarded her £1,499,606.62.

== Degree programmes ==
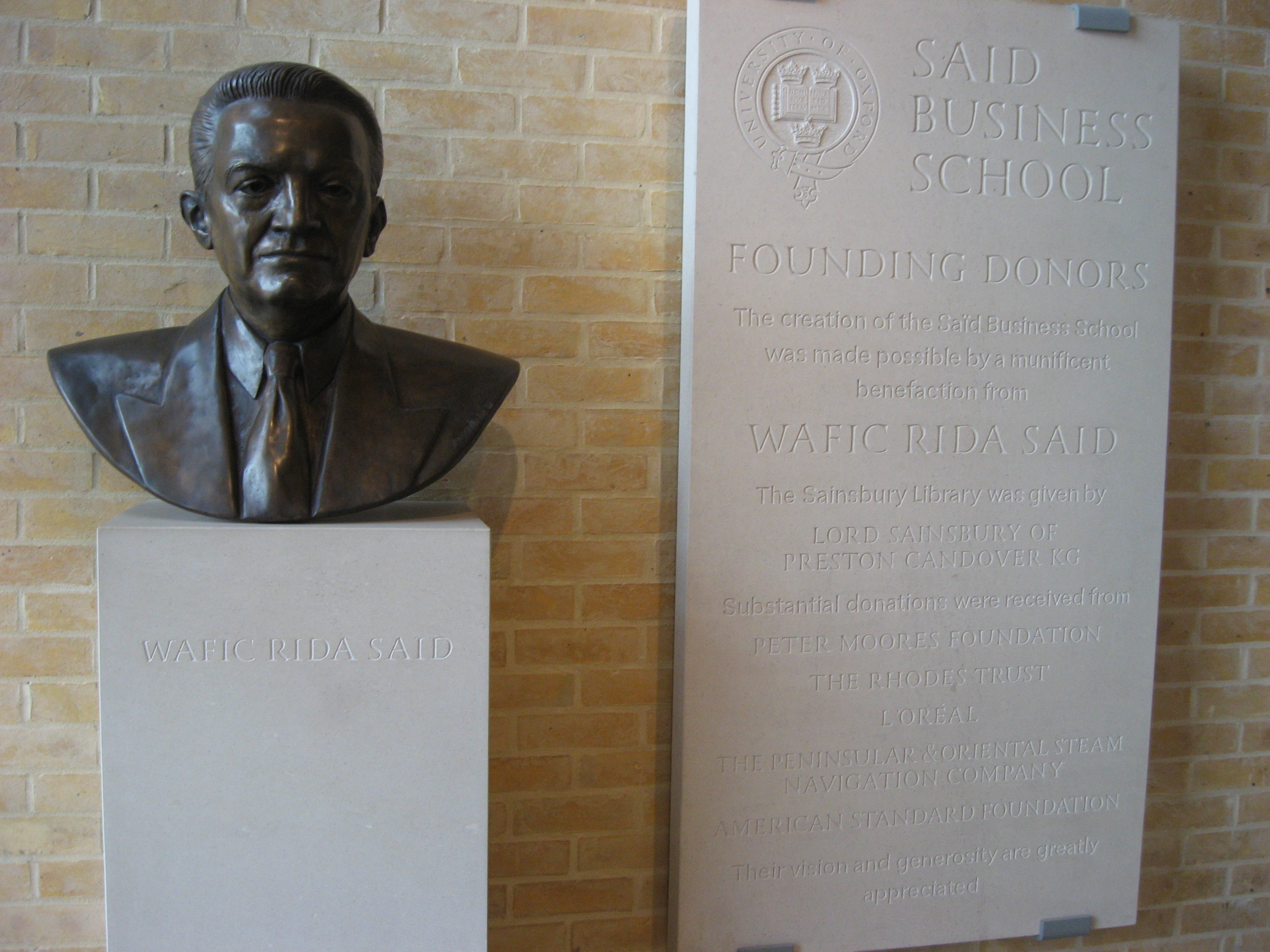
A bust of Wafic Saïd

Saïd Business School's main degree programmes are its one-year full-time MBA programme, the 22-month/2-year part-time Executive MBA programme, the 1+1 MBA, the DPhil in Management Studies, the DPhil in Finance, the MSc in Financial Economics in cooperation with the Economics Department, the two-year MSc in Major Programme Management, the one-year MSc in Law and Finance (MLF) in conjunction with the Oxford Law Faculty, the 18-month MSc in Global Healthcare Leadreship, the 2-year MSc in Applied Financial Economics and the 2-year/4-year MSc in AI for Business.

=== Undergraduate programme ===
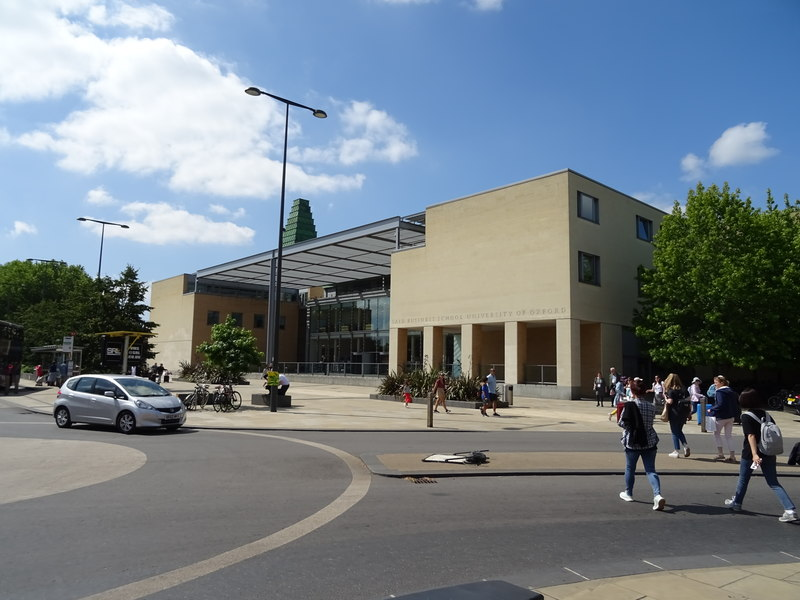
SBS building

Saïd Business School offers one undergraduate programme: the Bachelor of Arts in Economics and Management. This programme is taught jointly by the Department of Economics and the Business School.

=== Graduate programmes ===
==== MBA ====
Saïd Business School offers a one-year full-time Master of Business Administration degree, which enrolls approximately 332 students per year. In the 2025–2026 class of 332 students, 48% are female with 63 nationalities represented and averaged 5 years of work experience. Admissions standards are high, with an average Graduate Management Admission Test score of 690. The MBA programme was updated for the 2014/15 academic year. Under the Oxford Space Initiative, students in the MBA programme have the ability to explore the emerging global space economy.

==== Executive MBA ====
Saïd Business School also offers a 22-month or 2-year part-time Executive Master of Business Administration degree designed for people with more than 5 years' management experience. The Oxford EMBA is studied through 16 week-long modules largely taught in Oxford, but with at least two conducted in key international markets. The programme runs two iterations per year, with new cohorts starting in both September and January. There are 65–70 students in September 2025 class, from 38 different nationalities and 38% of which are women. There are several scholarships for women available each year for outstanding candidates.

==== 1+1 MBA ====
Dean Peter Tufano started the Oxford 1+1 MBA programme which allows students to pair the one-year full-time MBA programme with one of a selection of one-year MSc programmes offered by other University of Oxford departments.

==== MSc in Major Programme Management (MMPM) ====
The School runs a part-time two-year MSc in Major Programme Management. It accepts approximately 50-60 students per cohort, running a programme that features 8 modules and a thesis. Module topics (in 2025) are:

- Designing and managing successful programmes
- Major programme risk
- Systems thinking
- Governance and stakeholder leadership
- Major programme impact
- Research methods
- Managing performance
- Major programme futures

==== MSc in Global Healthcare Leadership ====
The School starts a part-time hybrid two-year MSc in Global Healthcare Leadership in September 2022/23 academic year. It was intended to start in the 2021/22 year but deferred due to the COVID-19 pandemic. This programme is being managed under both Said Business School and Nuffield Department of Primary Care Health Services. It has 8 modules each proceeded by a week of teachings in Oxford.

== Academic performance ==
Business school rankings

Europe
- QS MBA: 3
- Financial Times MBA: 7

Global
- QS MBA: 7
- Financial Times MBA: 27
- THE Business: 4

Saïd Business School is 1st in the 2022 Times Higher Education World University Rankings.

2023 QS Global MBA Rankings by Career Specialization:

- Finance: 7th in world
- Entrepreneurship: 7th in world
- Information Management: 5th in world
- Technology: 3rd in world
- Consulting: 19th in world

In the 2026 QS Global MBA rankings, Saïd Business School ranked 12th in the world (up from 19th in 2025) and 6th in Europe (up from 8th in 2025).

In the 2025 LinkedIn MBA rankings, Saïd Business School ranked 12th in the world (up from 15th in 2024) and 3rd in Europe (up from 4th in 2024).

In the 2025-2026 Bloomberg Businessweek MBA rankings, Saïd Business School ranked 6th in Europe (up from 7th in 2024-2025 and 10th in 2023-2024).

In the 2025 Pitchbook MBA rankings, the Oxford MBA ranked 17th in the world (up from 20th in 2024) and 5th in Europe (up from 7th in 2024).

In the 2025 QS Executive MBA rankings, Saïd Business School ranked 1st in the world.

== Admissions ==
The 2022-23 cohort of students on the MBA course comprised 64 different nationalities, with 93% coming from outside the UK. Nearly half (48%) were women. The median GMAT score was 690 and median GRE composite score was 320 (Quant - 160; Verbal - 160). The cohort's average work experience was 5 years and average age was 29 years.

== Administration ==
For administrative purposes, Saïd Business School is part of the University of Oxford's Social Sciences Division.

In June 2022 Professor Soumitra Dutta, former Professor of Management at the Cornell Cornell Johnson Graduate School of Management at Cornell University in New York, took up the position of Dean, replacing interim Dean Sue Dopson, Professor of Organisational Behaviour and Fellow of Green Templeton College. Previous Deans were Professor Peter Tufano (2011–2021), Professor Colin Mayer (2006–2011), Professor Anthony Hopwood (1999–2006) and Professor Sir John Kay (1996–1998). Professor Soumitra Dutta resigned in September 2025 when a five-month investigation upheld three allegations of harassment made by a female academic against Dutta.

== Notable alumni ==
- Joshua Abreu (MBA) – President of Securities at Central Bank of Paraguay
- Axel Addy (EMBA) – Minister for Commerce & Industry of Liberia
- Javed Afridi (PhD) Chief Executive Officer (CEO) of Haier Pakistan
- Mohamed Amersi (EMBA) – British businessman and philanthropist
- Shawn Baldwin (MFS) – American investor
- Michael Bates, Baron Bates (EMBA) – Minister of State for International Development
- Terry Beech (MBA) – Member of Parliament, Canada
- Ananya Birla – Indian singer and entrepreneur
- George Bridgewater (MBA) – New Zealand Olympic rower
- Caryn Davies (MBA) – USA Olympic rower
- Ruthe Farmer (MBA) – American policymaker and activist
- Elizabeth Filippouli – Greek broadcaster, entrepreneur and global business strategist
- Tim Foster (EMBA) – British Olympic rower
- Þorsteinn B. Friðriksson (MBA) – Icelandic mobile app entrepreneur
- Toshiharu Furukawa (MBA) – Japanese politician, Professor at Keio University
- Patrick Grant (EMBA) – British fashion designer
- Ante Kušurin (MBA) – Croatian Olympic rower
- Dame Emily Lawson (MBA) – head of the NHS COVID-19 vaccine programme
- Nate Morris (MBA) – American entrepreneur
- Stephen Robert Morse (MBA) journalist and film director/producer
- Claire Diaz Ortiz (MBA) – American, Twitter, Fast Company's 100 Most Creative People in Business
- Papa CJ (MBA) – Indian comedian
- Kenges Rakishev – Kazakhstan investor
- Jane Silber (MBA) – American businesswoman and computer scientist
- Colin Smith (MBA) – British Olympic rower
- Storm Uru (MBA) – New Zealand Olympic rower
- Cameron Winklevoss (MBA) – USA Olympic rower and Internet entrepreneur
- Tyler Winklevoss (MBA) – USA Olympic rower and Internet entrepreneur
- Andriy Zagorodnyuk – Ukrainian technology entrepreneur and former Minister of defence of Ukraine
- Sujeet Kumar (politician) (MBA class of 2005), Member of Parliament, Rajya Sabha (Upper House) of Indian Parliament and Author of the book 'AI on Trial'

== Faculty ==
- Richard Cuthbertson
- Tim Jenkinson
- Sally Maitlis
- Mari Sako
- Andrew T. Stephen
- Richard Whittington
- Athol Williams
- Ludovic Phalippou
