= Templeton College, Oxford =

Former college of the University of Oxford

Templeton College
- University of Oxford
- Location: Egrove Park
- Coordinates: 51.72889°N 1.25192°W
- Established: 1965
- Closed: 1 October 2008 (merged with Green College)
- Named for: Sir John Templeton
- Former names: Oxford Centre for Management Studies (1965–1983)

Map
- Location within Oxfordshire

Templeton College was one of the constituent colleges of the University of Oxford, England. It was an all-graduate college, concentrating on the recruitment of students in business and management studies. In 2008, the college merged with Green College, Oxford to form Green Templeton College, based on the existing Green College site.

== History ==
The college was founded in 1965 as the Oxford Centre for Management Studies. The college was based at Egrove Park in Kennington, south of Oxford. Its buildings were opened in 1969 and were listed in 1999.

It was renamed Templeton College in 1983 as a result of a donation from Sir John Templeton, in honour of his parents, Harvey Maxwell and Vella Handly Templeton. The intention was to raise professional standards in British management. The endowment was one of the largest endowments ever made to a British educational establishment. Initially a "society of entitlement" in the university, Templeton College began admitting graduate students in 1984 and became a full graduate college of the university by royal charter in 1995.

In November 2005, the college transferred its executive education business to the Saïd Business School.

On 26 February 2007, two bombs were found planted at Templeton College. An animal rights activist was convicted of conspiracy to commit arson in February 2009.

On 3 July 2007, it was announced that Templeton College would merge with Green College, Oxford with effect from 1 October 2008 to form Green Templeton College, Oxford, based on the existing Green College site. Templeton's former site at Egrove Park remains in use by the Saïd Business School as its Executive Education Centre.

== See also ==
- Ahrends, Burton and Koralek architects
- List of Principals of Green Templeton College, Oxford
