= Tamaulipan mezquital =

Xeric shrublands ecoregion in Mexico and the United States

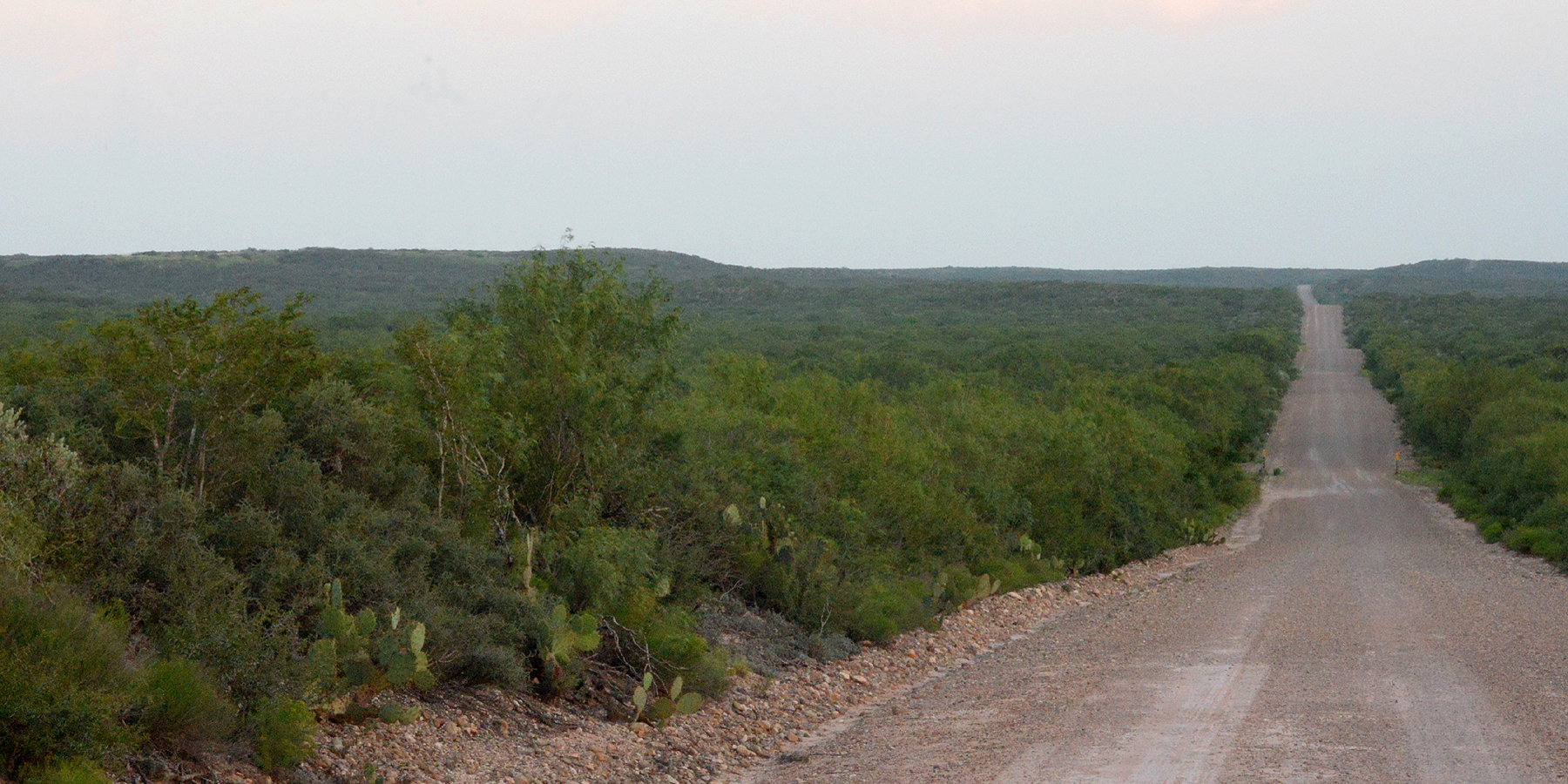
- Tamaulipan thornscrub, Webb County, Texas (10 June 2016)

Ecology
- Realm: Nearctic
- Biome: Deserts and xeric shrublands
- Borders: List: Chihuahuan Desert; East Central Texas forests; Edwards Plateau savanna; Tamaulipan matorral; Veracruz moist forests; Western Gulf coastal grasslands
- Bird species: 340
- Mammal species: 90

Geography
- Area: 141,500 km^{2} (54,600 mi^{2})
- Countries: Mexico; United States
- States: Coahuila; Nuevo Leon; Tamaulipas; Texas
- Rivers: Rio Grande
- Climate type: Hot semi-arid (BSh)

Conservation
- Habitat loss: 18.449%
- Protected: 0.68%

The Tamaulipan mezquital (Spanish: Mezquital Tamaulipeco), also known as the Brush Country, is a deserts and xeric shrublands ecoregion in the Southern United States and northeastern Mexico. It covers an area of 141,500 km^{2} (54,600 sq mi), encompassing a portion of the Gulf Coastal Plain in southern Texas, northern Tamaulipas, northeastern Coahuila, and part of Nuevo León.

== Distribution ==
The Sierra Madre Oriental range to the west separates the Tamaulipan mezquital from the drier Chihuahuan Desert. The Tamaulipan matorral is a transitional ecoregion between the mezquital and the Sierra Madre Oriental pine-oak forests to the west and the Veracruz moist forests to the south. The Western Gulf coastal grasslands, known as the Tamaulipan pastizal south of the border, fringe the Gulf of Mexico. The Edwards Plateau savannas lie to the north, and the East Central Texas forests and Texas blackland prairies to the northeast.

== Geography ==
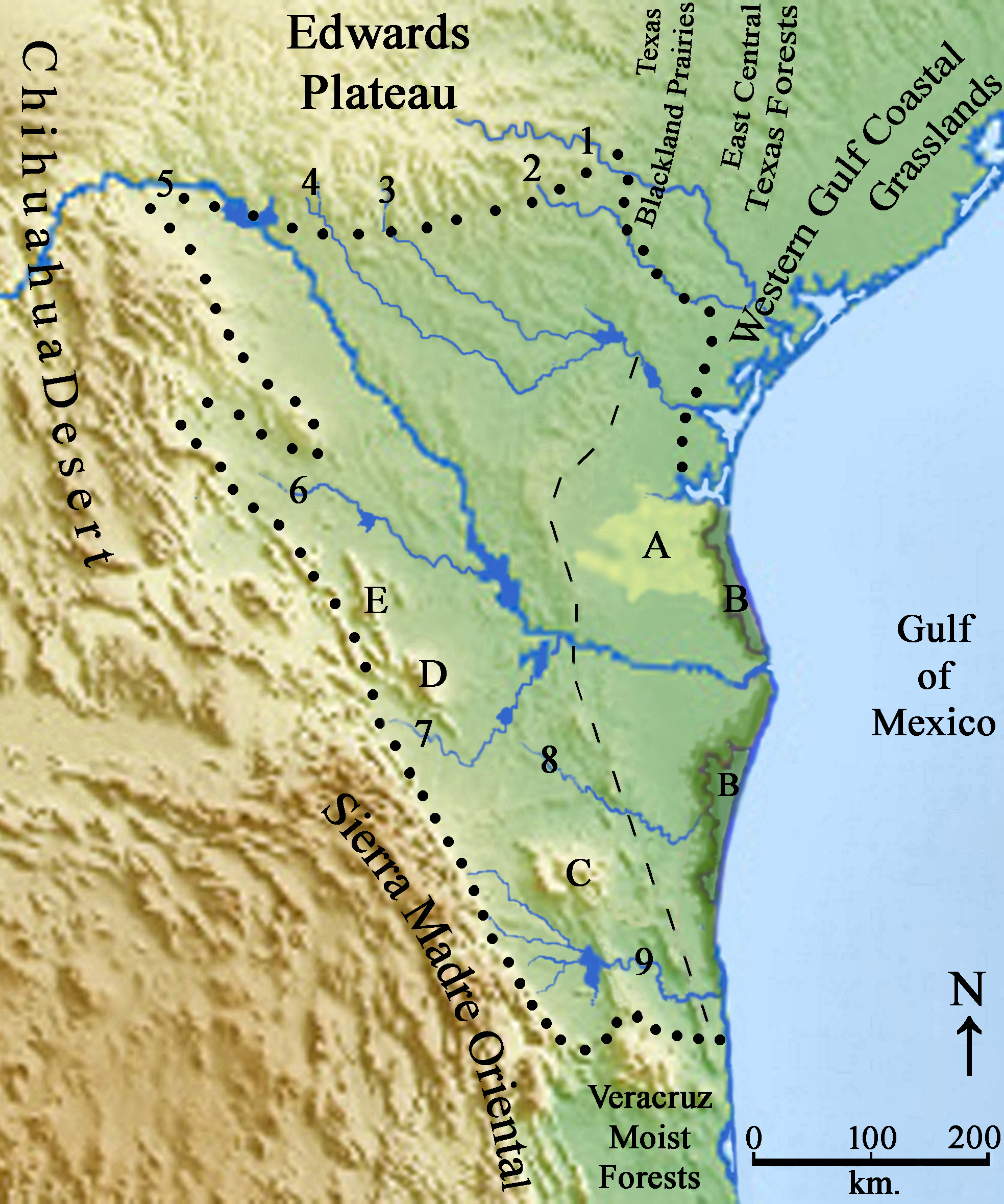
Tamaulipan biotic province = dotted line, Bordas Escarpment = dashed line. A = Costal Sand Plains; B = Laguna Madre; C = Sierra San Carlos; D = Sierra Los Picachos; E = Sierra de Lampazos. 1. Guadalupe River; 2. San Antonio River; 3. Frio River; 4. Nueces River; 5. Rio Grande / Rio Bravo; 6. Rio Salado/Rio Sabinas; 7. Rio San Juan; 8. Rio San Fernando; 9. Rio Soto La Marina.

The Bordas Escarpment transects this ecoregion, running from near the southern limit northwest to the vicinity of Rio Grande City, Texas, arching back northeast to the vicinity of Choke Canyon Reservoir in Texas. The region east of the Bordas Escarpment is flat with deep, sandy soils, of which vast areas both north and south of the border have been converted to agricultural use. West of the Bordas Escarpment the topography changes to gently rolling hills with a thin layer of high calcium soil over a thick layer of caliche. Some large portions of the west are poorly suited for cultivation but good for ranching and excellent wildlife habitat.

A series of Cenozoic strata of limestone, sandstone, siltstone, and claystone occur throughout most of the region. These strata are slightly tilted, gently slanting seaward, with increasingly recent exposures to the east, including some Quaternary bodies at the coast transitioning into the sea, and a few older Cretaceous exposures and outcrops appearing in some far western interior areas. Elevations generally range from near sea level to 300 meters, transitioning at ca. 300–500 meters into the Sierra Madres, Edwards Plateau, and Chihuahua Desert in western areas. A series of small mountain ranges occur in the region, isolated on the coastal plain between the Sierra Madre Oriental and the Gulf of Mexico. These ranges are not part of the strata of the Gulf Coast Plain or the complexly folded and faulted Jurassic and Cretaceous formations of the Sierra Madre Oriental. The Sierra de San Carlos, (and Sierra de Tamaulipas just beyond the southern limit of this ecoregion) are plutons, igneous rock intrusions of nepheline syenite to gabbroic composition, emplaced during the Mid-Tertiary with a few minor sierras of alkaline basalt flows occurring locally (e.g. in the vicinity of Llera, Tamaulipas).

The Coastal Sand Plain, sometimes referred to as the "Wild Horse Desert", is a region of Quaternary sand deposits extending about 60 miles inland from the Laguna Madre. It is bordered by Baffin Bay to the north and the Lower Rio Grande Valley to the south. Quaternary to Tertiary marine sedimentary strata, which may be exposed in western areas, underlie the sand sheet. The sand sheet is six feet deep in many places with maximum dune elevations reaching 30 feet. Although the area is generally flat, the unstable sands often form a dune and swale topography where vegetated dunes are interspersed with active, unstable, wind-blow dunes. The active dunes attain areas as large as 250 acres, predominantly in the eastern third. Grasslands cover much of the sand plain where seacoast bluestem (Schizachyrium littorale) is dominant in all but the wettest areas. These grasslands are banded with live oak (Quercus virginiana) groves, forming dense forest in spots, and smaller honey mesquite (Prosopis glandulosa) mottes in discontinuous belts which are sometimes connected with one another and collectively cover at least a quarter of the sand sheet. Numerous ephemeral, internally drained ponds form where subsidence and blow-outs occur.

Hydrology: The region is generally semi-arid however, various wetlands are present. The Laguna Madre is one of only five hypersaline coastal lagoons (or negative estuaries) in the world and a significant ecosystem in itself, laying between the Gulf of Mexico and the Tamaulipan mezquital ecoregion. As one moves inland from the hypersaline lagoon, a relatively narrow band of freshwater marshlands are encountered running north to south, albeit occurring fragmented and irregularly. These marshes are dynamic, fluctuating with rainfall and tropical storm activity, and alternating with wet and dry periods. When and where present, these marshlands can be locally, surprisingly extensive with deep marshes and both permanent and ephemeral freshwater ponds that support populations of salamanders (Siren intermedia), turtles (Trachemys), and millions of migrating waterfowl, such as redheads (Aythya americana) in the winter.

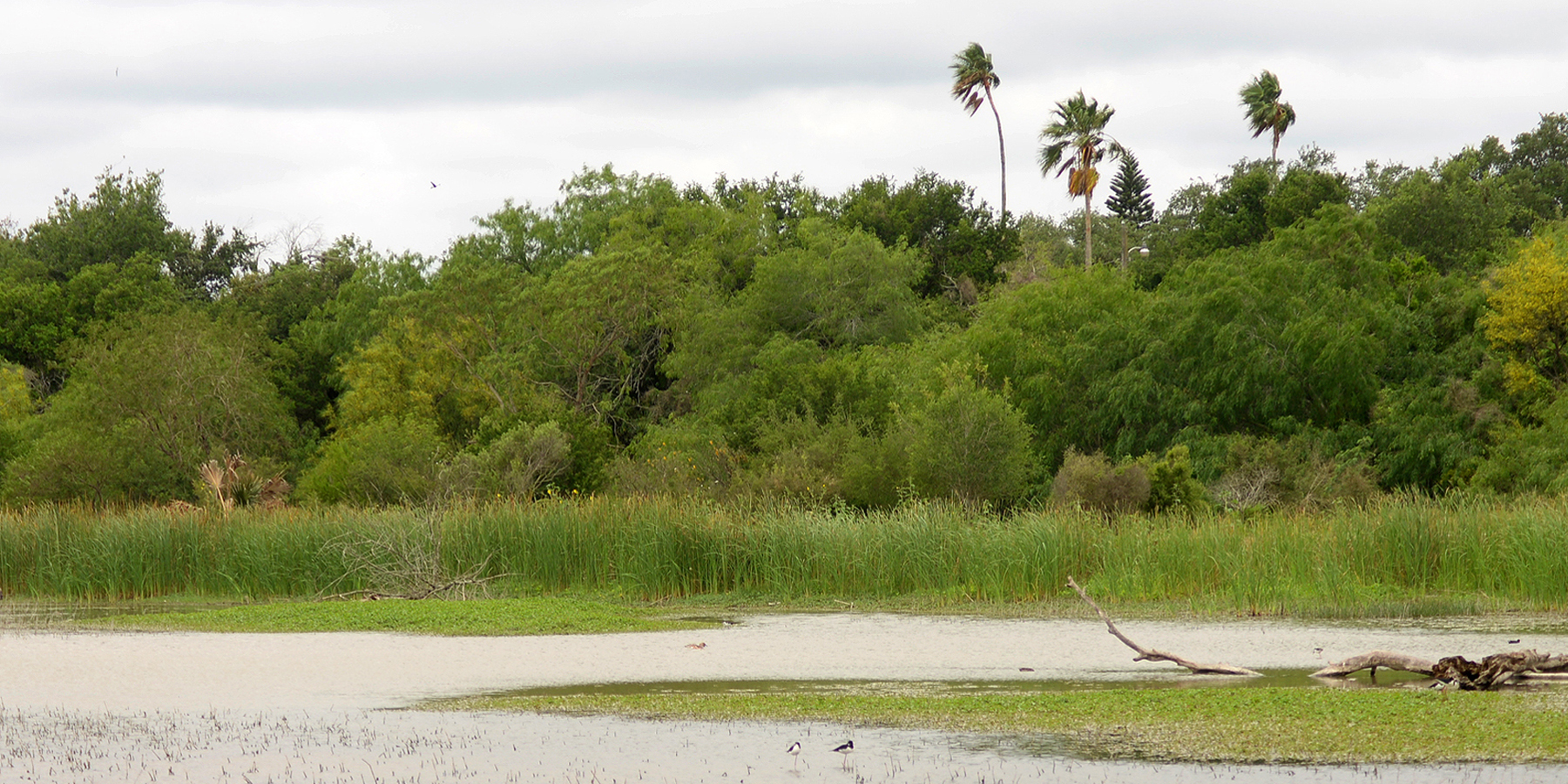
A resaca in Estero Llano Grande State Park, Hidalgo County, Texas, USA (13 April 2016)

Several rivers cross the region, all flowing eastward to the Gulf of Mexico. Many of these river have created innumerable oxbow lakes, resacas, and abandoned channels with associated marshes and swamps as they meander across the flat coastal plain east of the Bordas Escarpment. The few remaining riparian zones in this region that have not been cleared for agriculture, housing, and industry, can support unexpectedly lush tropical jungle vegetation, particularly in the south. The San Antonio River (a major tributary of the Guadalupe River) runs at the approximate northeastern border of this region. Other major rivers (north to south) include: the Nueces River and its tributary the Frio River; Rio Grande (referred to as Rio Bravo in Mexico) and its tributaries Rio Salado, Rio San Juan; the Rio San Fernando (sometimes called the Rio Conchos and not to be confused with the major drainage Rio Conchos of Chihuahua); the Rio Soto La Marina and its tributaries Rio San Carlos, Rio Pilón, San Antonio, Rio Purificacion, Rio Corona, Rio Santa Ana, form the approximate southern border.

A number of large lakes occur in the region, but they were all constructed in the decades fallowing the Second World War in the 20th century. These include: Choke Canyon Reservoir and Lake Corpus Christi in the Nueces River drainage in the USA; Amistad International Reservoir and Falcon International Reservoir on the Rio Grande; Presa Venustiano Carranza in Coahuila on the Rio Salado, Presa El Cuchillo in Nuevo Leon and Presa Marte R. Gómez in Tamaulipas on the Rio San Juan, and Presa Vicente Guerrero in Tamaulipas on the Rio Soto La Marina drainage in Mexico.

== Gallery ==
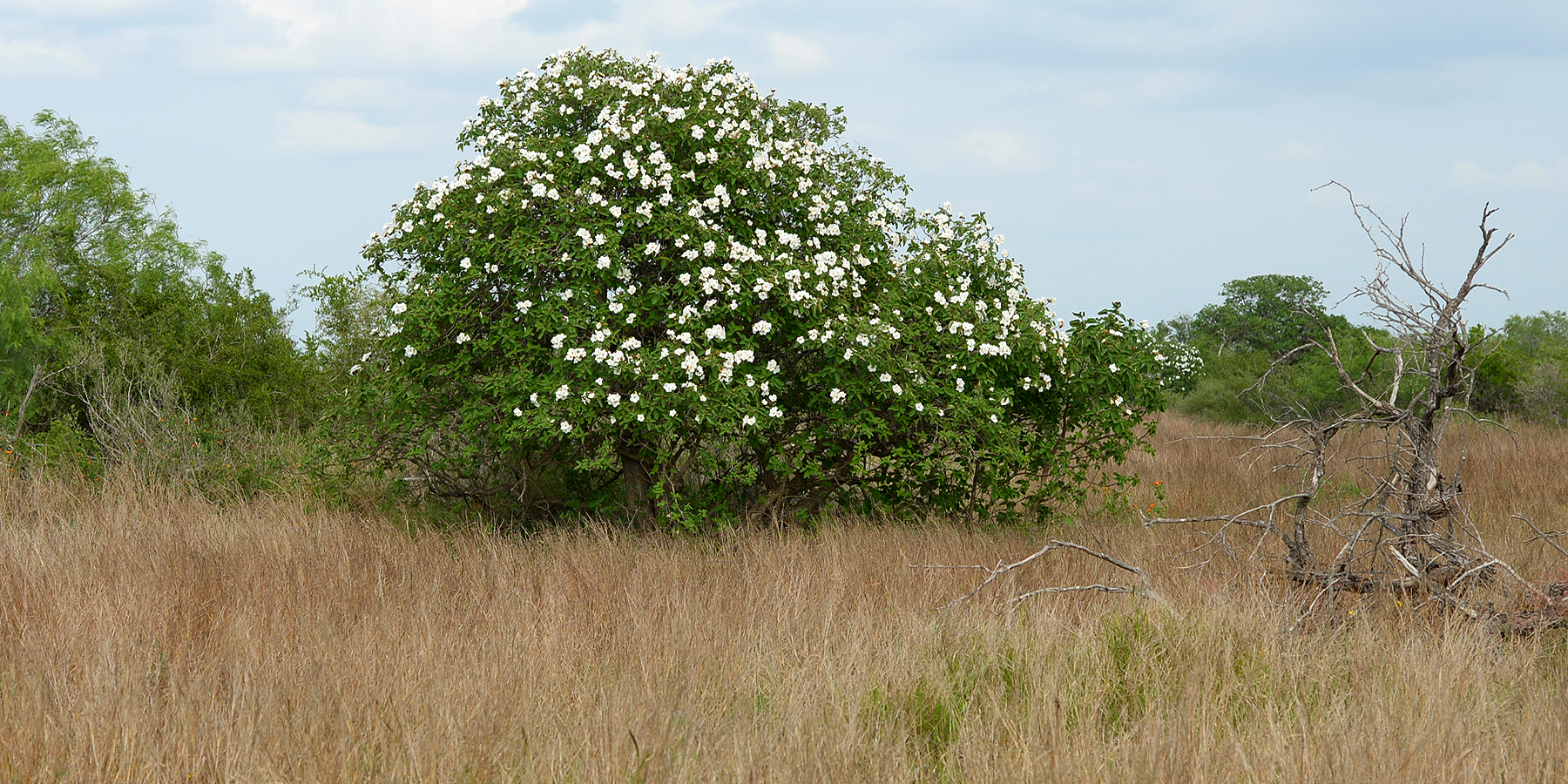
Grasslands with Wild Olive (Cordia boissieri), Jim Hogg County, Texas (10 April 2016)

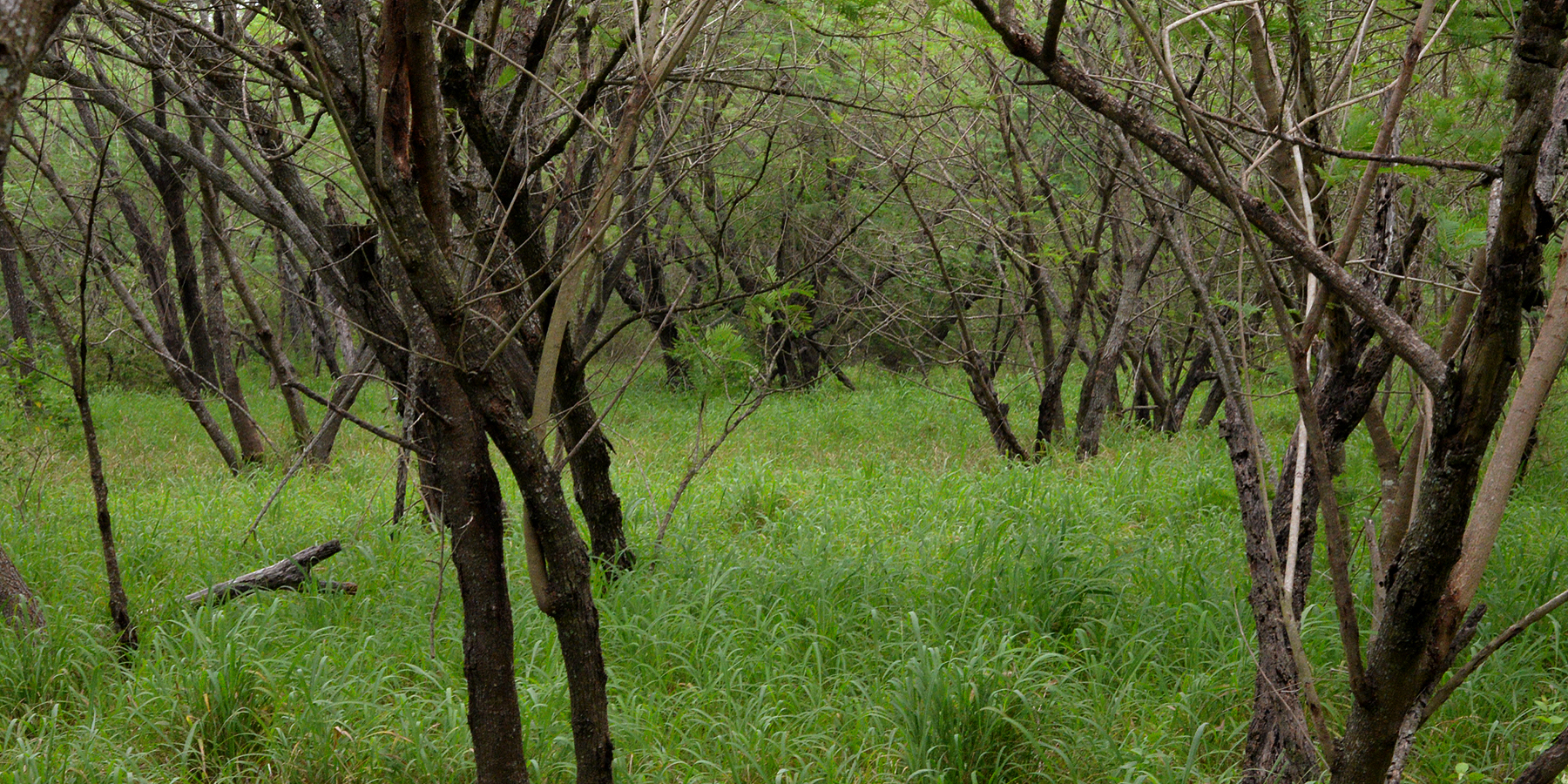
Mesquite woodlands, Sabal Palm Sanctuary, Cameron County, Texas (11 April 2016).

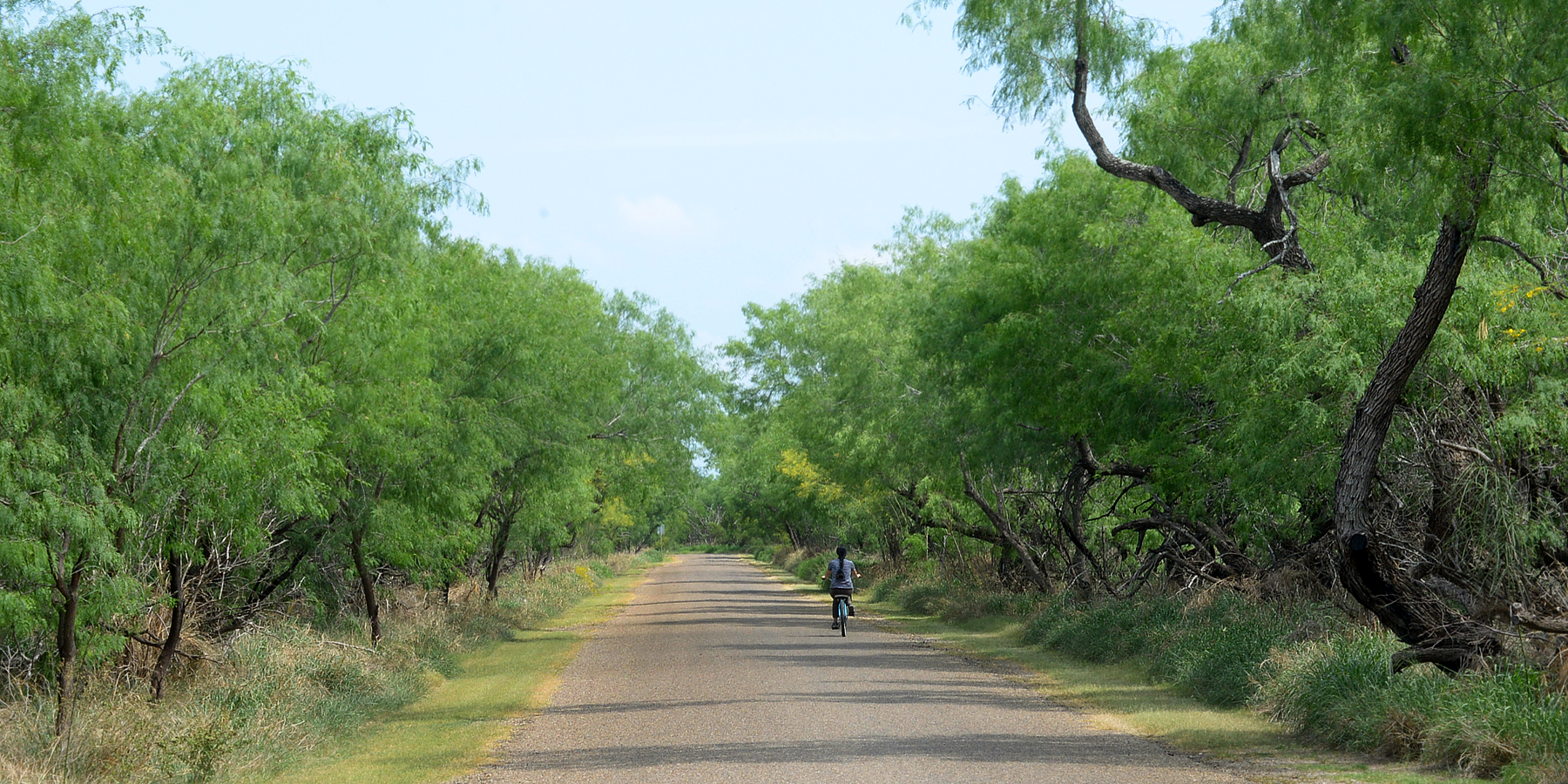
Bentsen-Rio Grande Valley State Park, Hidalgo County, Texas (15 April 2016)

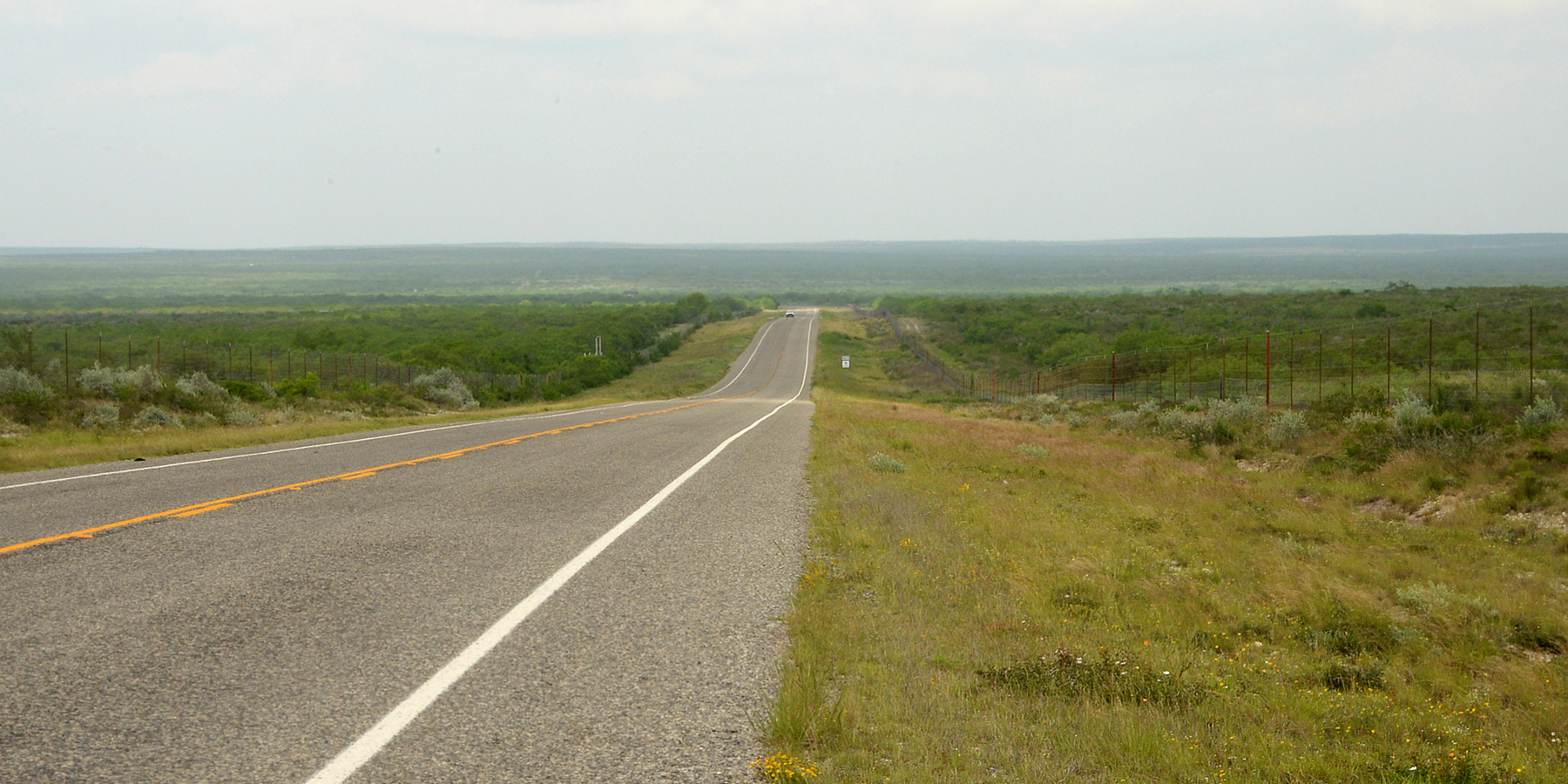
State Highway 16, Duval County, Texas (16 April 2016)

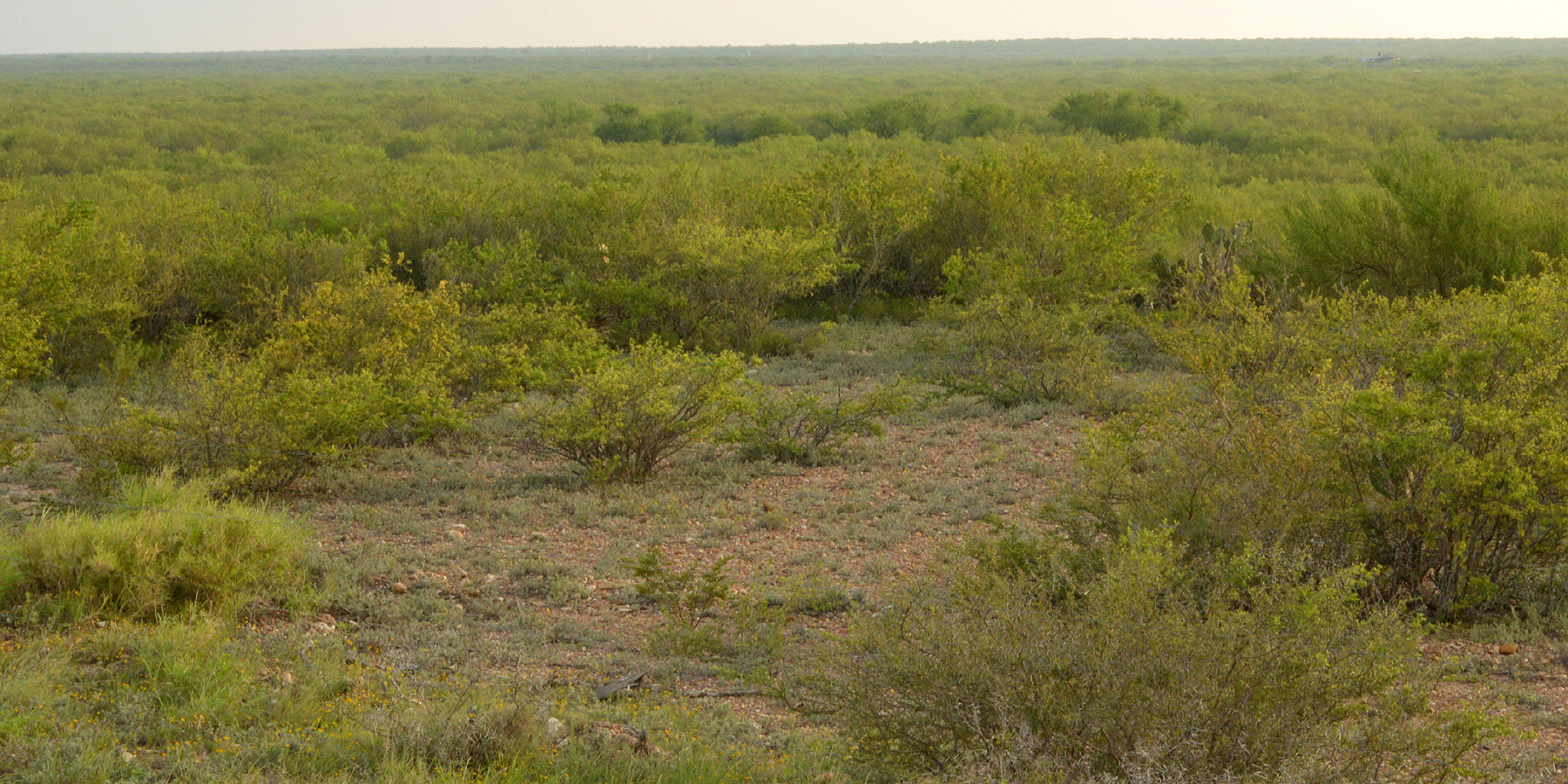
Tamaulipan thornscrub, private ranchland, Webb County, Texas (10 June 2016).

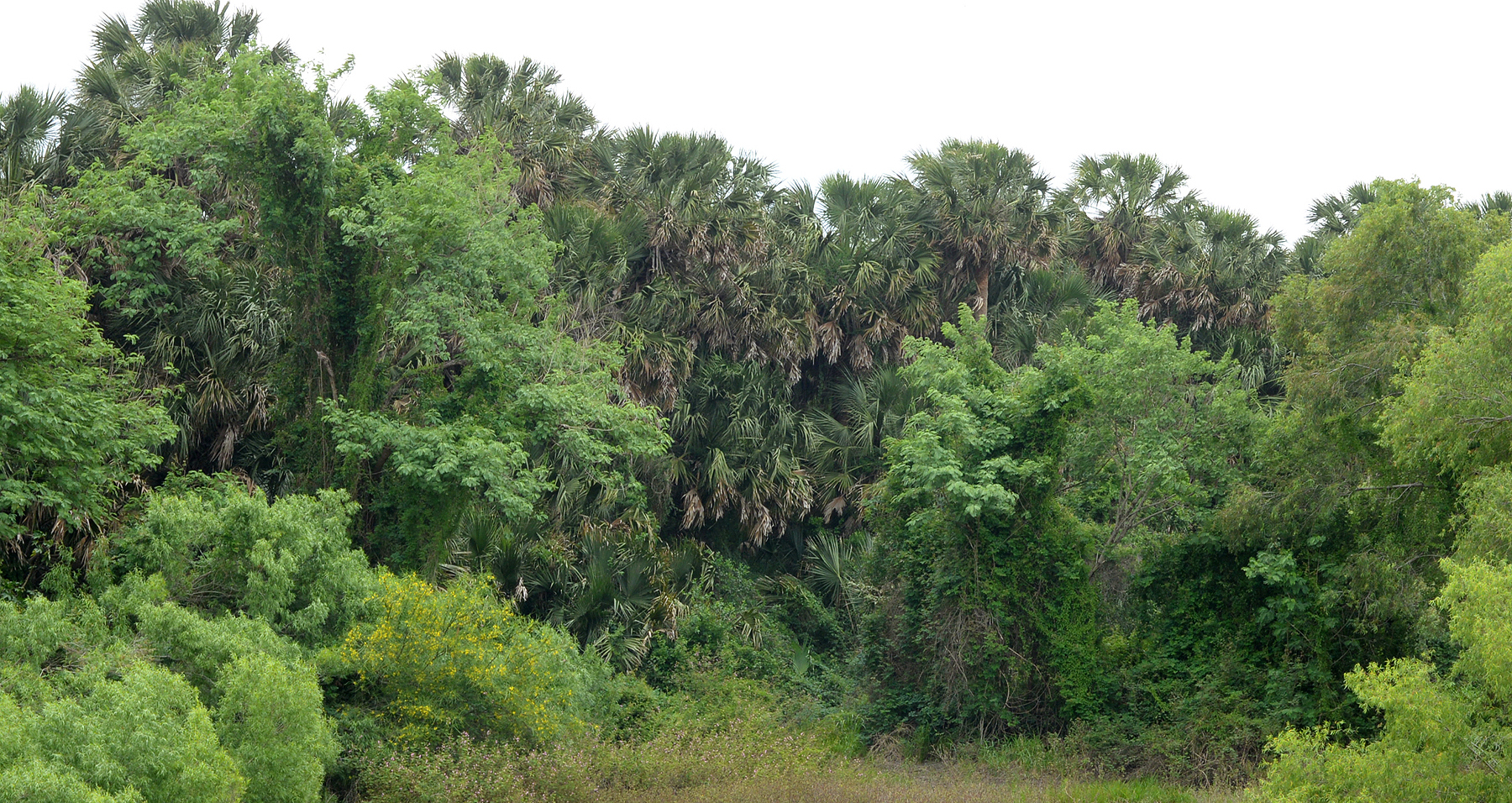
Old growth sabal palm grove, Sabal Palm Sanctuary, Cameron County, Texas (11 April 2016).

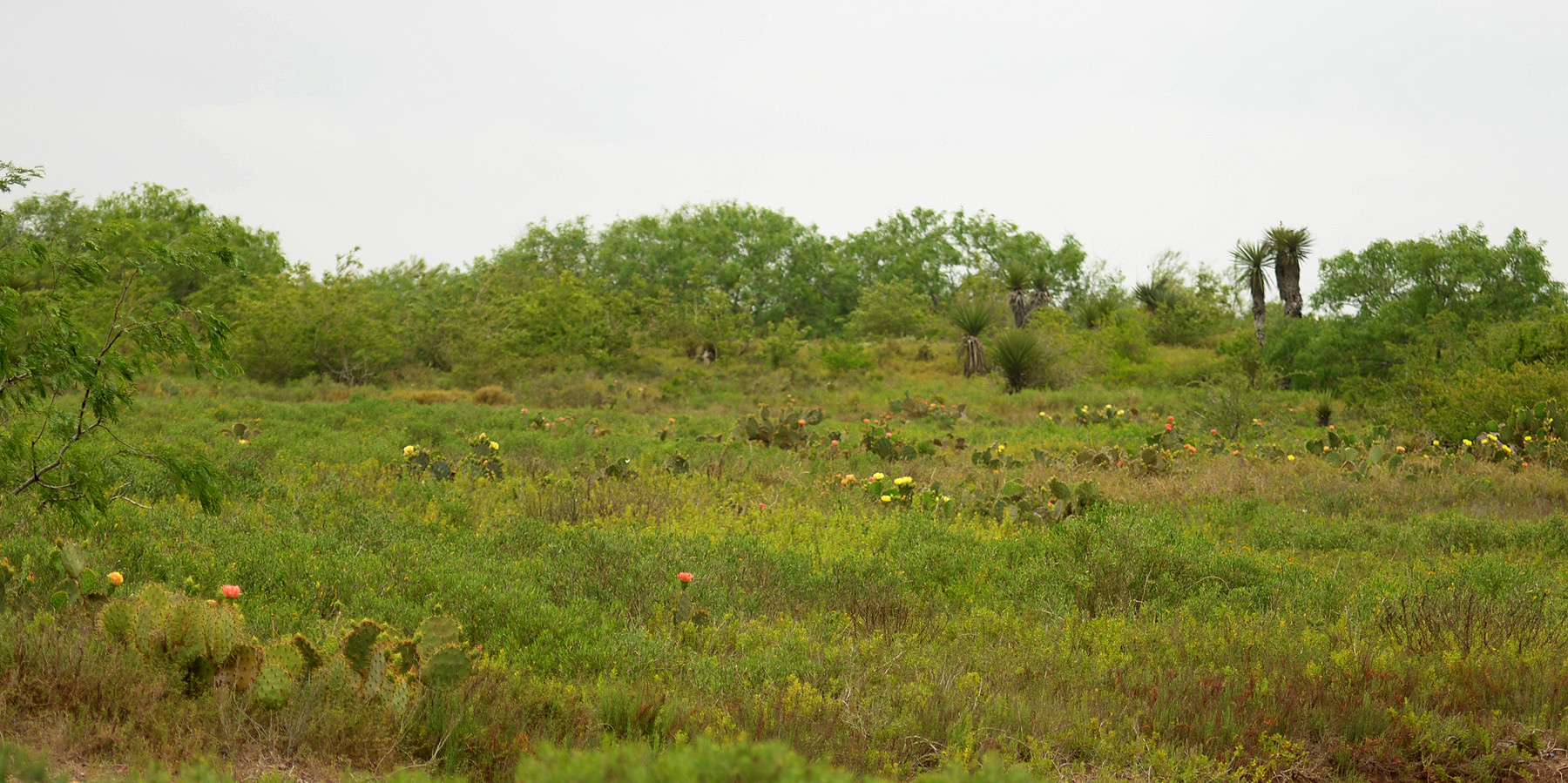
Tamaulipan thornscrub, State Highway 4, Cameron County, Texas (11 April 2016)

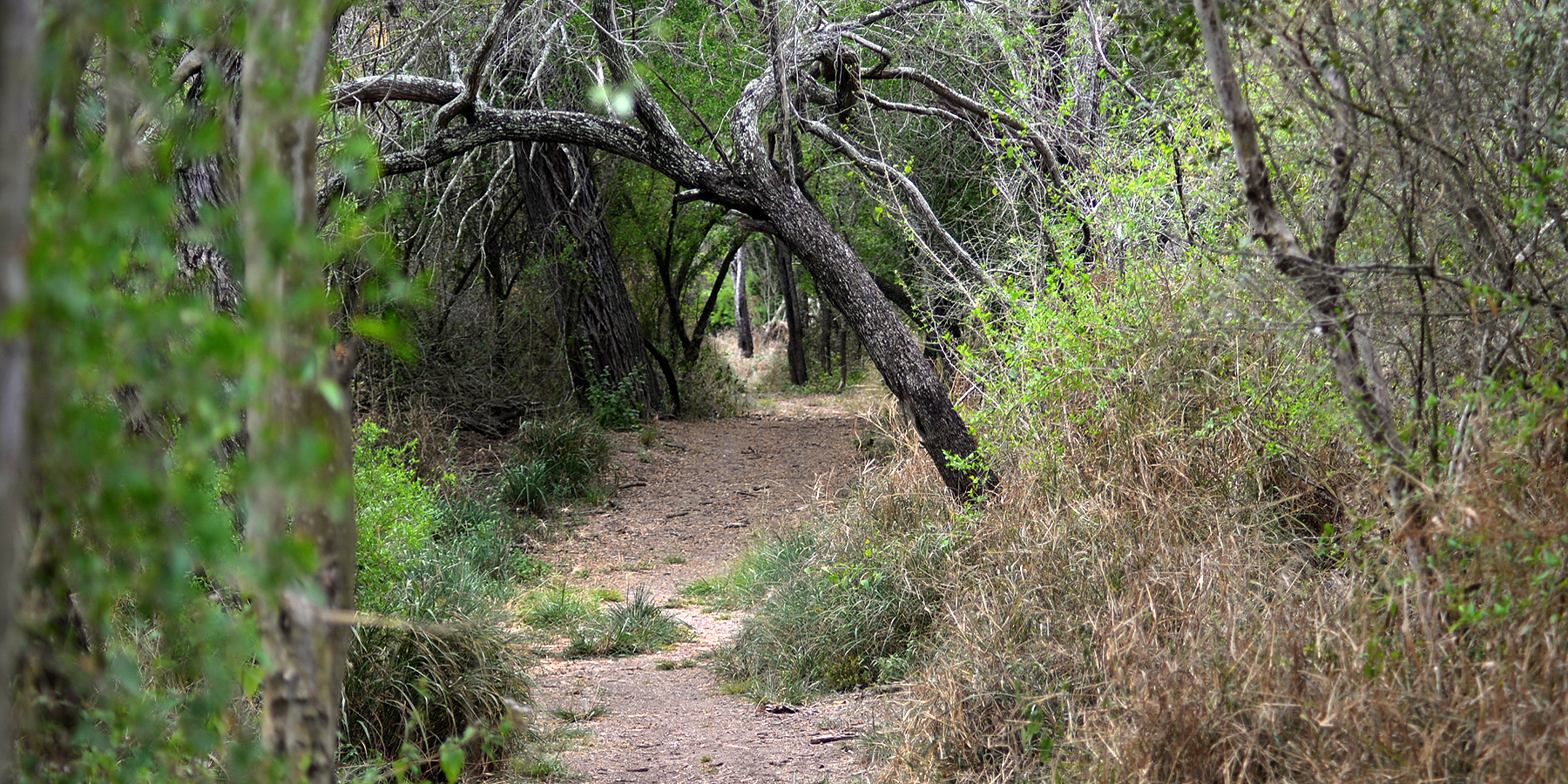
Trail through mature thornscrub forest in Santa Ana National Wildlife Refuge, Hidalgo County, Texas (14 April 2016).

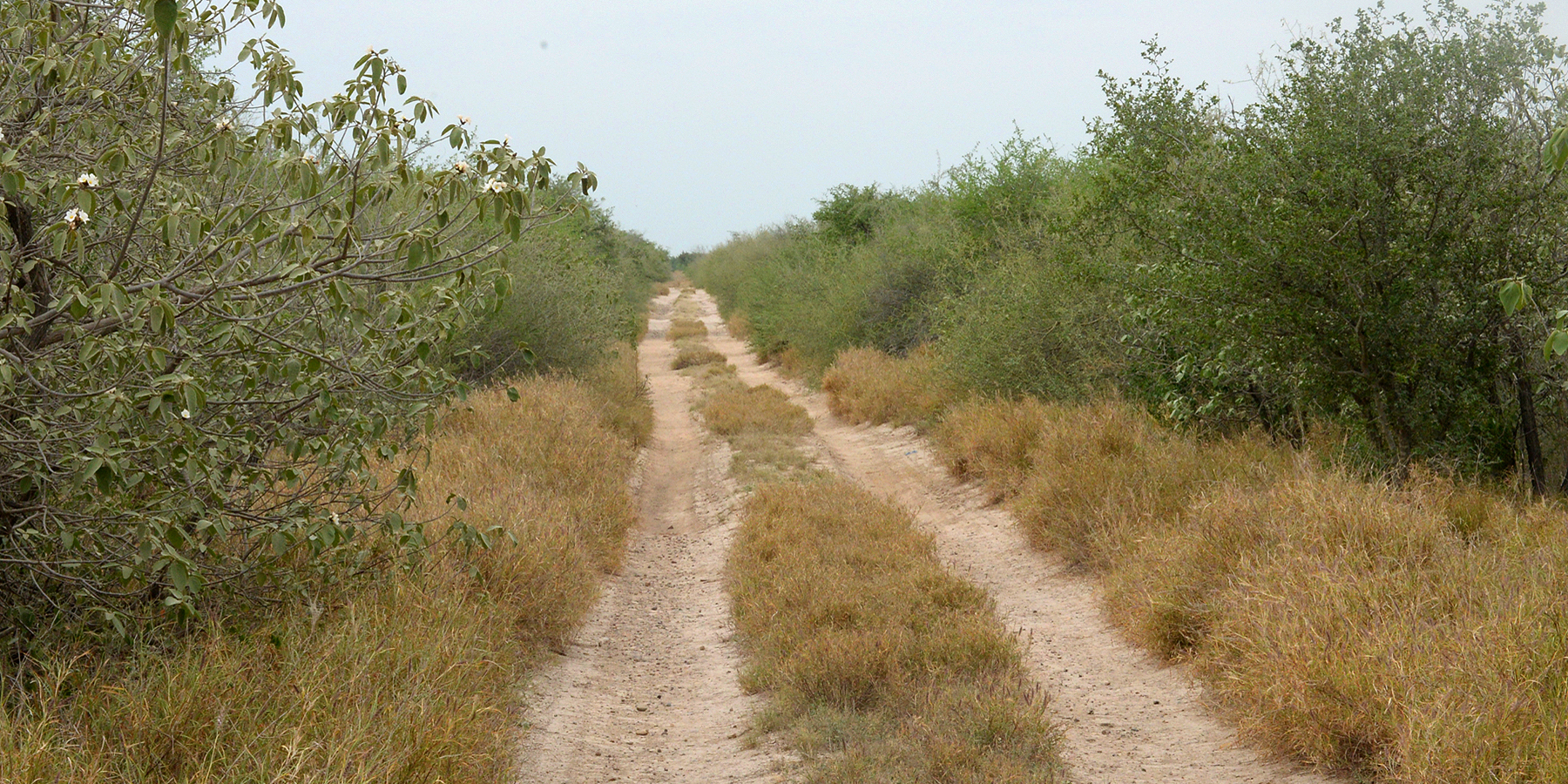
Road in thornscrub vegetation, Yturria Brush National Wildlife Refuge, Hidalgo County, Texas (15 April 2016)

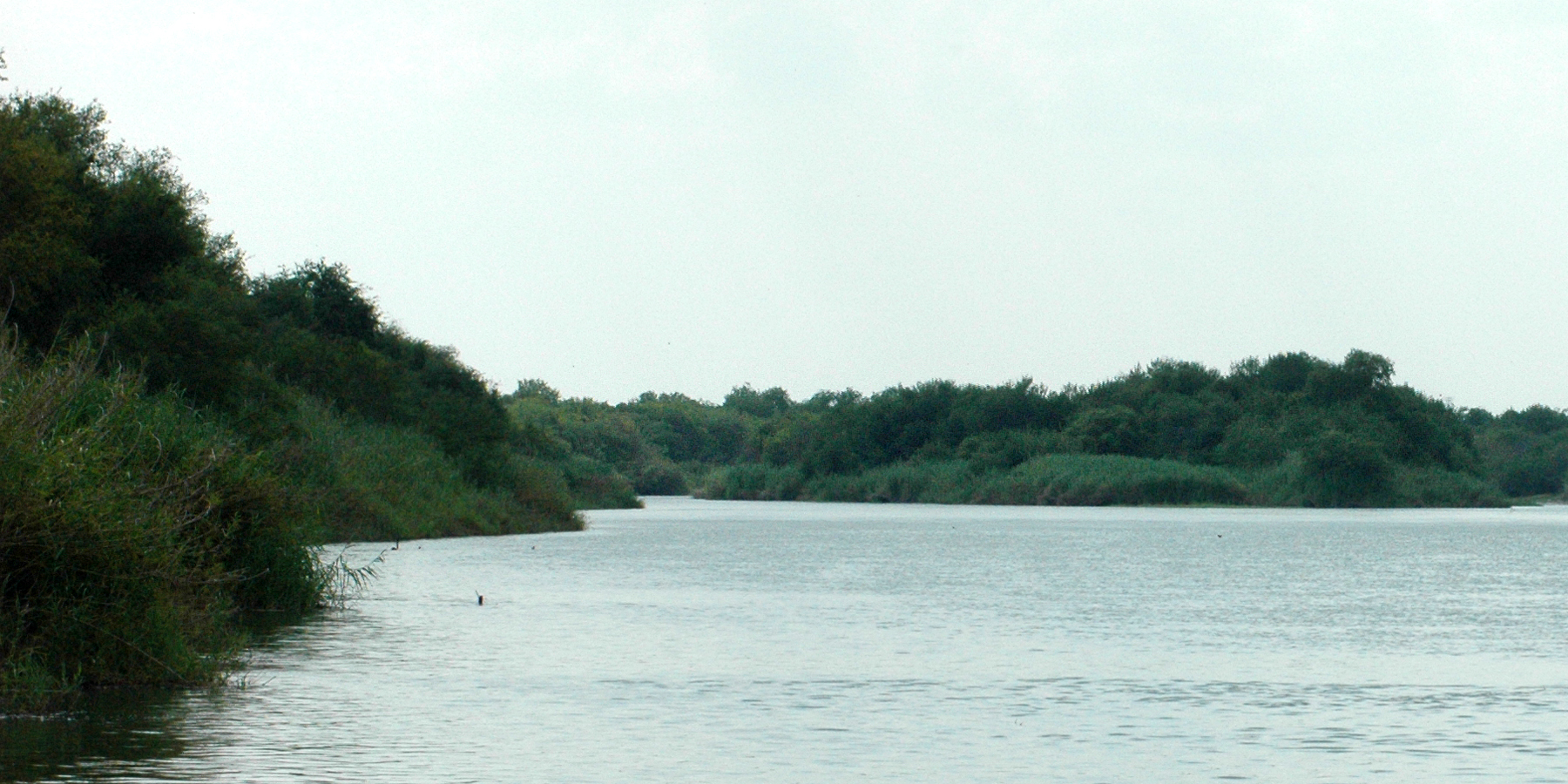
Rio Grande southeast of Falcon Reservoir, Municipality of Mier, Tamaulipas, Mexico (12 August 2007)

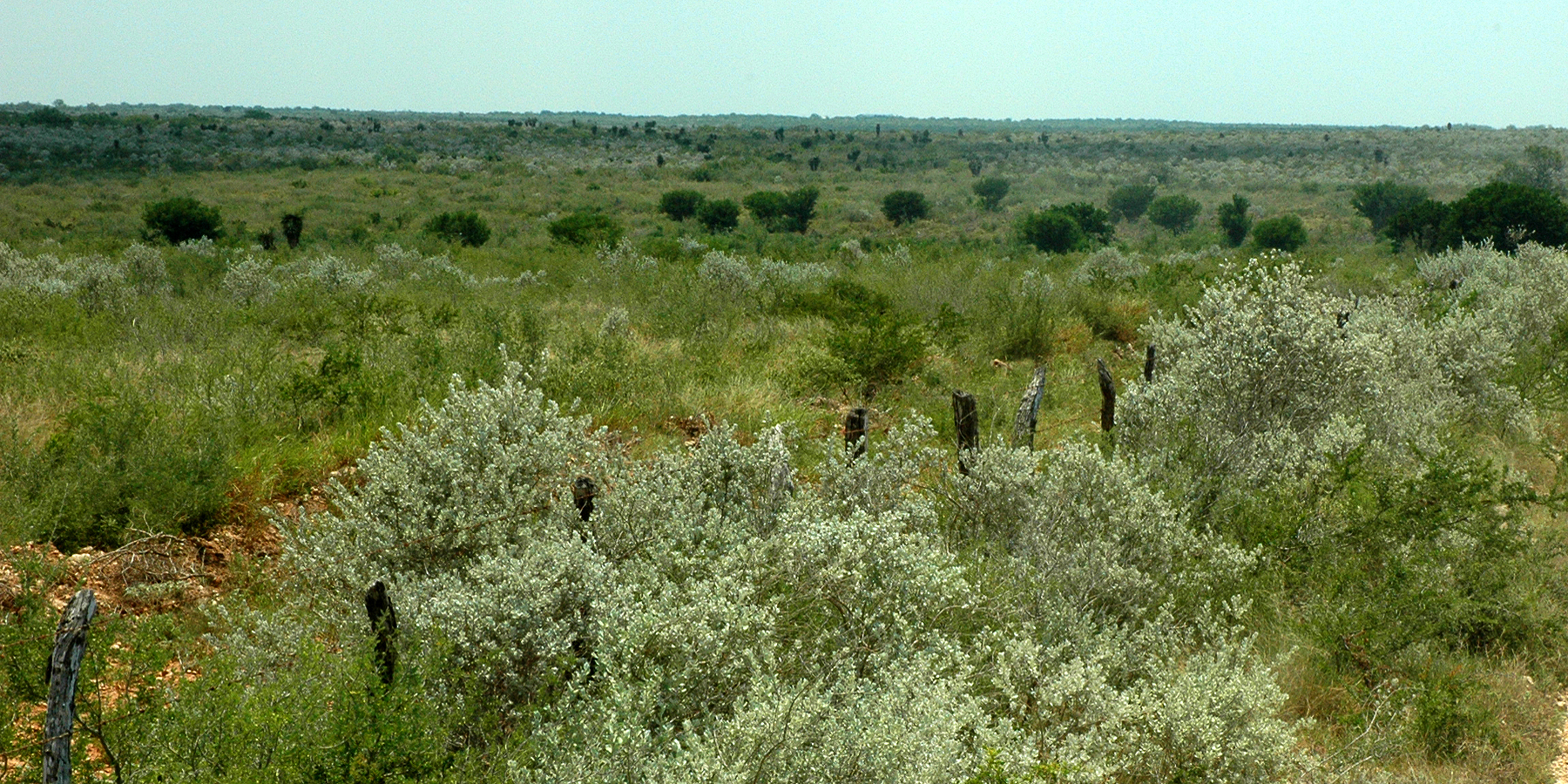
Thornscrub south of Reynosa, Municipality of Reynosa, Tamaulipas, Mexico (13 August 2007)

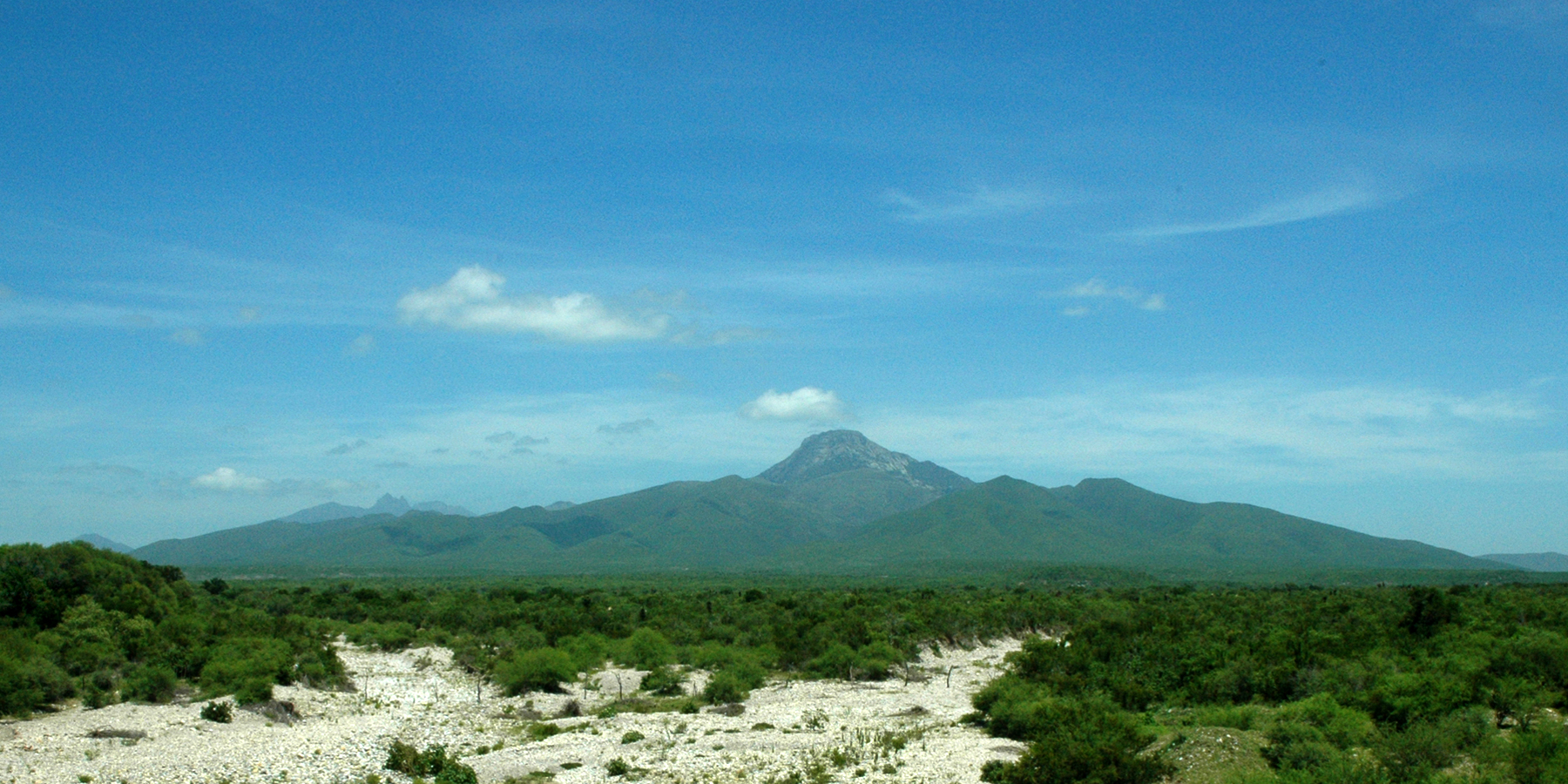
Sierra San Carlos, Municipality of San Carlos, Tamaulipas, Mexico (14 July 2007)

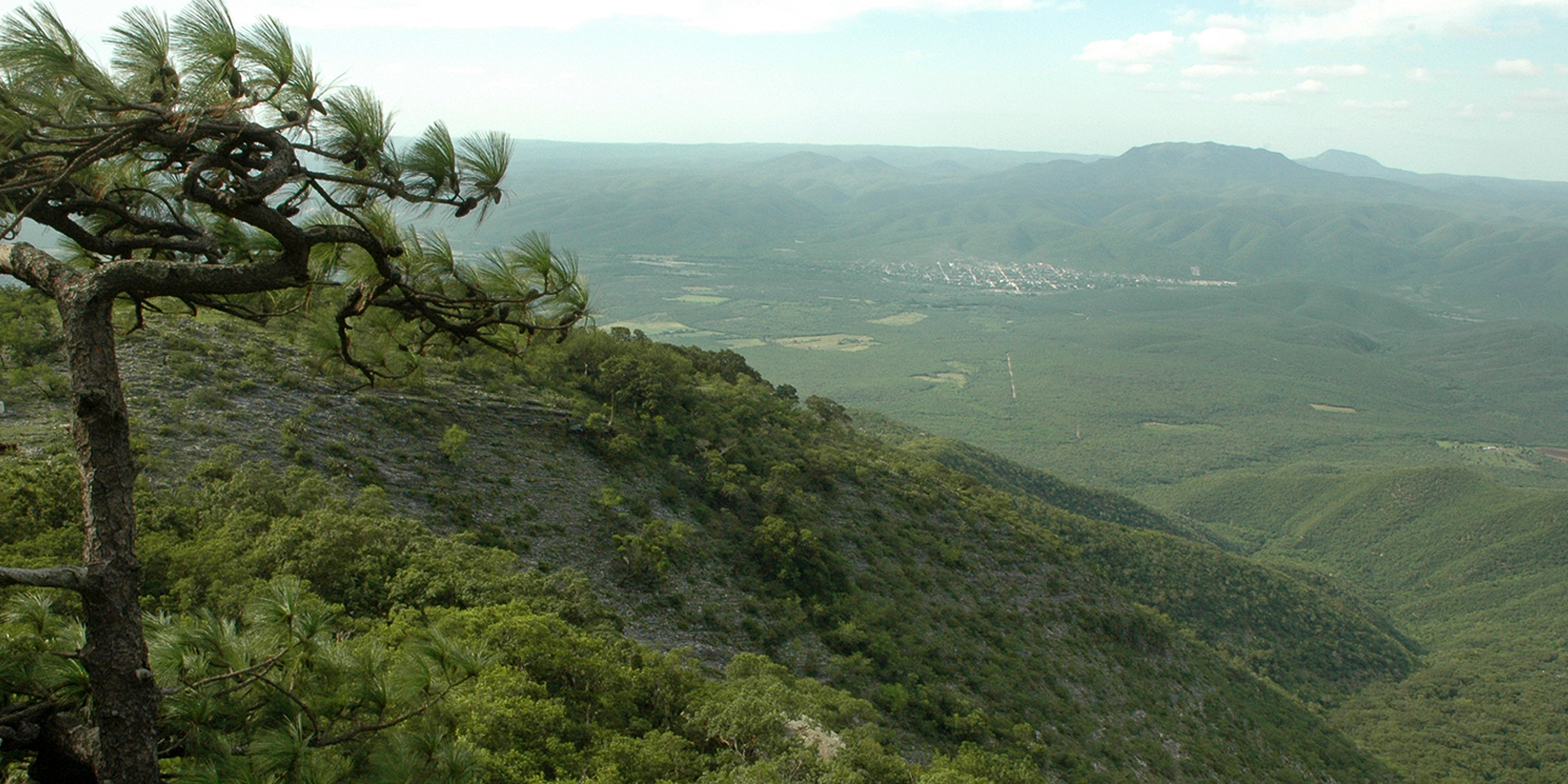
Sierra San Carlos, with a pine tree (Pinus teocote) on left, Municipality of San Carlos, Tamaulipas, Mexico (12 July 2007)

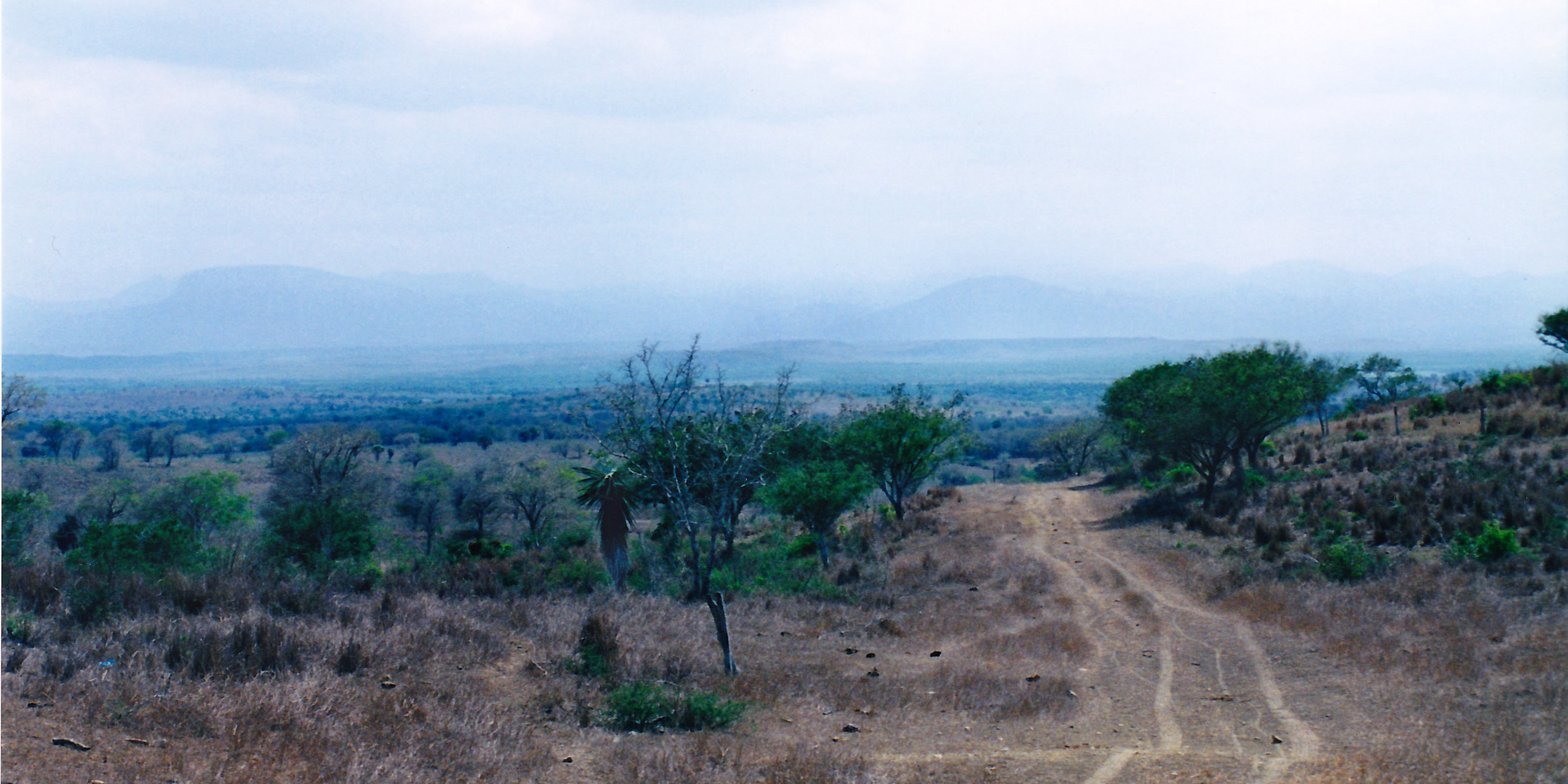
Thornscrub ranchland west of Tepehuajes, Municipio Soto La Marina, Tamaulipas, Mexico (20 May 2002)

== Flora ==
This semi-arid region is dominated by Mezquital (Spanish for a mesquite grove), thorny brush, and chaparral vegetation referred to as Tamaulipan thornscrub. In this subtropical environment some plant growth continues through most of the year, particularly in the south. Years with droughts or tropical storms and hurricanes can dramatically affect vegetation at any given locality, particularly the herbaceous ground layer, which may be sparse with patches of bare earth in a dry year, or thick and verdant in a wet year. Thornscrub vegetation tends to grow taller in the east, benefited by coastal moisture where it can be impenetrable in places, and it is often shorter and may be more open in interior areas of the region, although soils also influence this throughout the region. Mixtures of sand and clay make up much of the soils with pockets of near pure sand and near pure clay occurring locally. Sandy soils in this region tend to support more open vegetation with widely spaced trees and shrubs in grasslands, while clay soils tend to support a greater diversity and denser, sometimes even canopied areas of trees and shrubs. Past land usage can also have a significant influence, where recently cleared areas may have a near monoculture of honey mesquite (Prosopis glandulosa), with pricklypear (Opuntia engelmannii var. lindheimeri), and non-native grasses in the understory. Some species of are nearly ubiquitous, occurring in most of the soils and vegetation communities, although varying in levels of dominance, some of these include honey mesquite, granjeno or spiny hackberry (Celtis ehrenbergiana), tasajillo or desert Christmas cholla (Cylindropuntia leptocaulis), Texas persimmon (Diospyros texana), Texas prickly pear (Opuntia engelmannii var. lindheimeri), and blackbrush (Vachellia rigidula). Other common trees and shrubs more often found on clay soils include whitebrush (Aloysia gratissima), goatbush or amargosa (Castela erecta), brasil (Condalia hookeri), colima (Xanthoxylum fagara), Texas ebony (Ebenopsis ebano), anacua (Ehretia anacua), guayacan (Guaiacum angustifolium), Texas purple sage or cenizo (Leucophyllum frutescens), retama (Parkinsonia aculeata), guajillo or Berlandier acacia (Senegalia berlandieri), and huisache (Vachellia farnesiana var. farnesiana).

Grasslands with sparsely scattered trees and shrubs occur on level to gently rolling sites with sandy soils. These are dominated by dense graminoids such as Texas grama (Bouteloua rigidiseta), little bluestem (Schizachyrium scoparium), sand dropseed (Sporobolus cryptandrus), and many others. Wildflowers include bull-nettle (Cnidoscolus texanus), shrubby blue sage (Salvia ballotiflora), hairy tubetongue (Justicia pilosella), Texas palafoxia (Palafoxia texana), and hairy zexmania (Wedelia texana). Shrub-dominated patches may develop within these grassy sites where tighter, clay soils occur, reaching six meters or higher, often dominated by several of the ubiquitous species noted above.

Woodlands occur in places with a well-developed canopy over an understory of grasses. The grasses in these communities contain a layer of taller species such as hooded windmill grass (Chloris cucullata), Texas bristlegrass (Setaria texana) and four-flower trichloris (Trichloris pluriflora), and a layer of shorter species such as grama (Bouteloua spp.) and curly mesquite grass (Hilaria belangeri). In some places dense stands of Texas prickly pear occur instead of shrubs and grasses. Canopy species include many ubiquitous trees along with huisache (Acacia farnesiana), desert hackberry (Celtis pallida), brasil (Condalia hookeri), Texas hogplum (Colubrina texensis), colima (Zanthoxylum fagara), and others. Other shrubs include desert yaupon (Schaefferia cuneifolia), narrowleaf forestiera (Forestiera angustifolia), and lotebush (Ziziphus obtusifolia).

Xeric rocky uplands with shallow calcareous soils on caliche and gravel substrates support shrublands one half to two meters high. Species such as cenizo (Leucophyllum frutescens), guajillo (Acacia berlandieri), blackbrush (Vachellia rigidula), Texas kidneywood (Eysenhardtia texana), twisted acacia (Vachellia schaffneri), Spanish dagger (Yucca treculeana), and baretta (Helietta parvifolia) and others grow with more ubiquitous trees and shrubs such as honey mesquite. The creosote bush (Larrea tridentata) grows in western areas. The herbaceous layer may be sparse in places where rocky exposures occur. Forbs and wildflowers can be conspicuous in rocky areas, including narrowleaf thryallis (Galphimia angustifolia), peonia (Acourtia runcinata), Gregg's senna (Chamaecrista greggii), plateau rocktrumpet (Macrosiphonia macrosiphon), and hairy zexmenia (Wedelia hispida).

Saline lakes and saline thornscrub occur in some interior, low-lying areas with interior draining basins, created by runoff and evaporation. Lakebeds (often dry) may lack vegetation or have sparse halophytic grasses and forbs like alkali sacaton (Sporobolus airoides), sea ox-eye daisy (Borrichia frutescens), and saltwort (Batis maritima). Surrounding saline thornscrub is semi-open with ubiquitous shrubs under 5 m., growing with species like saladillo (Varilla texana), knifeleaf condalia (Condalia spathulata), Johnston's seaheath (Frankenia johnstonii), and screw bean mesquite (Prosopis reptans) among others. Soils may have a thin layer of gravel over clay with patchy grasses and cacti such as Fitch's hedgehog cactus (Echinocereus reichenbachii var. fitchii) and horse crippler (Homalocephala texensis). Internally drained basins with non-salin, or freshwater also occur on clay lined or clay loam soils that hinder drainage. Sometimes called potholes, lagunas, lagunitas, ponds, or copitas, these are ephemeral wetlands but may remain moist over extended periods of time.

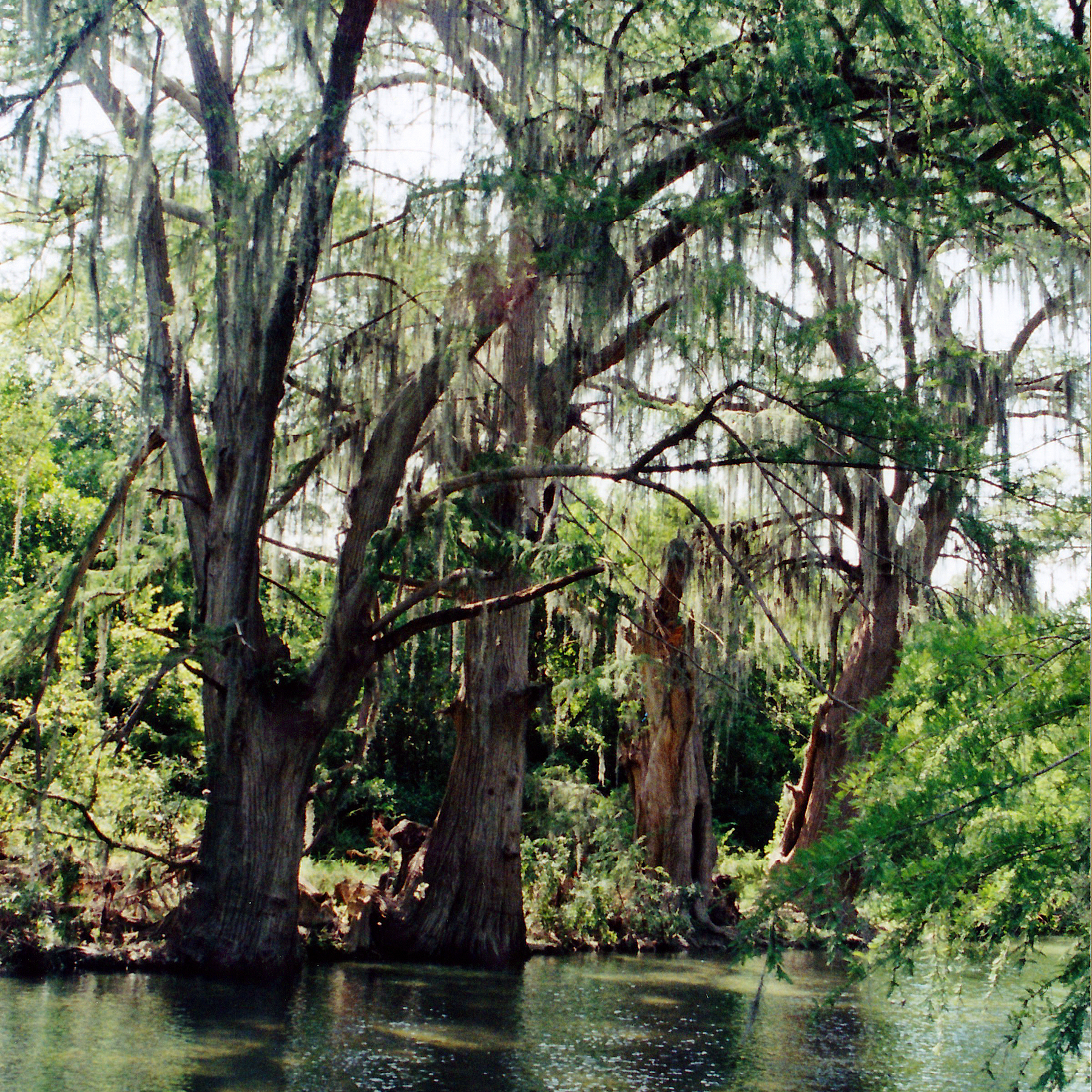
Montezuma bald cypress (Taxodium mucronatum) Rio Pilón near Villagrán, Tamaulipas, Mexico (9 August 2005).

Riparian zones and floodplains can support luxuriant forest on the alluvial soils of the major rivers. These can sometimes have a dense canopy up to 15 meters high. Dominant canopy species may include many of the ubiquitous and common species noted above, as well as granjeno (Celtis ehrenbergiana), sugar hackberry (Celtis laevigata), Texas ebony (Ebenopsis ebano), anacua (Ehretia anacua), Mexican ash (Fraxinus berlandierana), tepeguaje (Leucaena pulverulenta), and cedar elm (Ulmus crassifolia). Riverbanks may have a reduced over-story with black mimosa (Mimosa asperata), black willow (Salix nigra), and giant reed (Arundo donax) an invasive species. Numerous species of vines and epiphytes like Spanish moss (Tillandsia usneoides) are frequently encountered as well as rarer Bailey's ballmoss (Tillandsia baileyi). The herbaceous layer is often not well developed. In the Nueces River drainage and northward, pecan (Carya illinoinensis) and plateau live oak (Quercus fusiformis) may be common. Diversity increases southward and the Rio Grande Delta has a denser understory with a sub-canopy layer at 4 to 5 meters including Sierra Madre torchwood (Amyris madrensis), Texas torchwood (Amyris texana), Barbados cherry (Malpighia glabra), catclaw acacia (Senegalia wrightii), brushholly (Xylosma flexuosa), and others. Monumental Montezuma cypresses (Taxodium mucronatum) once lined portions of the Rio Grande and other southern rivers, but few remain today. Parque Nacional El Sabinal in the town of Ciudad Cerraivo, Nuevo Leon preserves some fine examples of old Montezuma cypress in an urban environment. Only a few, small groves of Mexican sabal palm (Sabal mexicana) remain on the Rio Grande Delta, but it is believed they once occurred as far as 120 km. inland. Palms may dominate the canopy or share dominance with other floodplain species reaching 15 meters. The herbaceous layer may include bunch cutgrass (Leersia monandra), tropical sage (Salvia coccinea), and blue boneset (Tamaulipa azurea), or dead palm fronds may restrict the development of the ground layer.

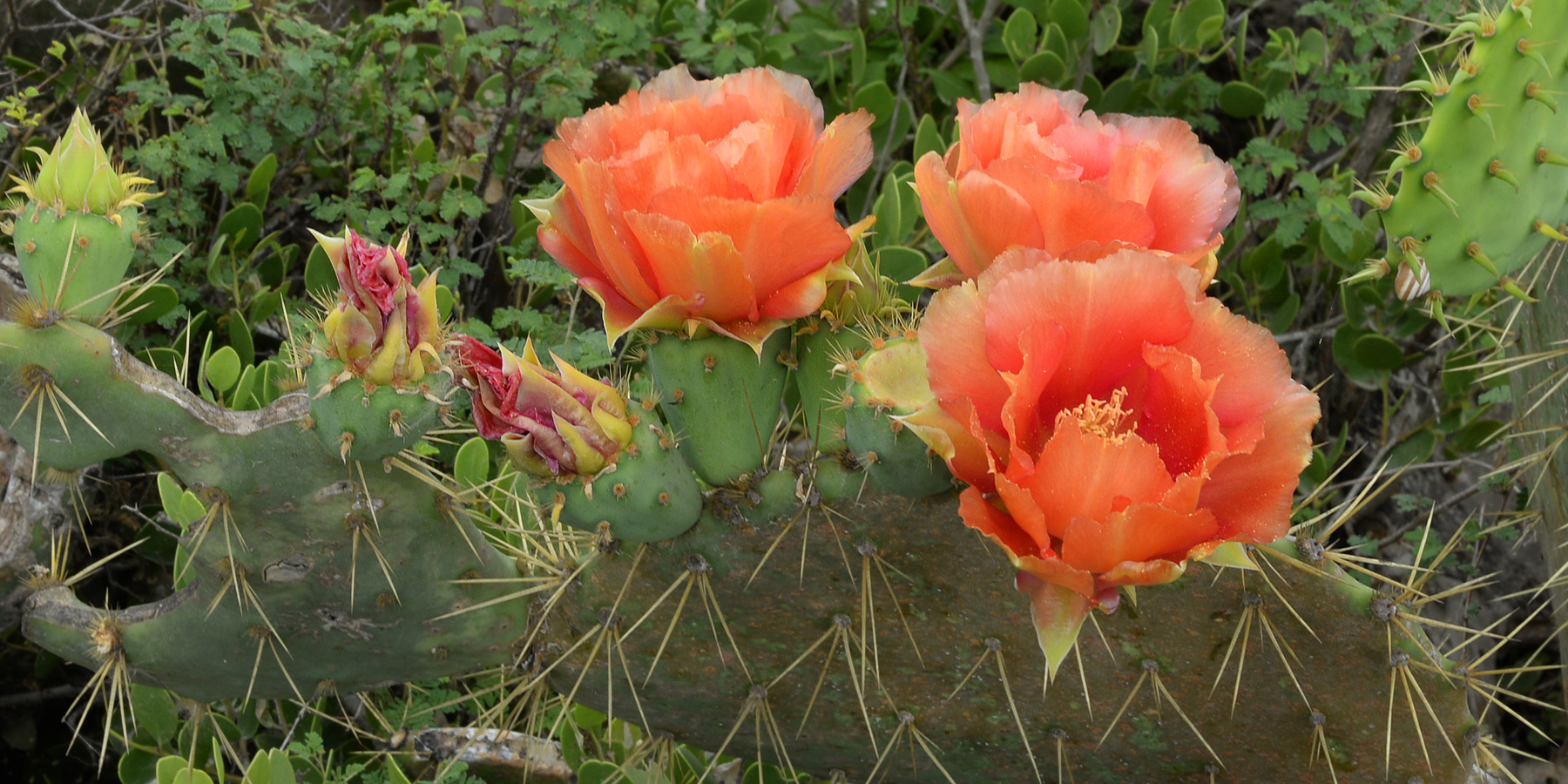
Texas Prickly Pear (Opuntia engelmannii var. lindheimeri), State Highway 4, Cameron County, Texas, USA (11 April 2016)

Cacti: This region is rich in cacti diversity. In addition to wide-ranging species like lace cactus (Echinocereus reichenbachii), and horse-crippler cactus (Homalocephala texensis), other species found in the province include: root cactus (Sclerocactus scheeri), triangle or barbed wire cactus (Acanthocereus tetragonus), star cactus (Astrophytum asterias), Runyon's beehive cactus (Coryphantha macromeris var. runyonii), Berlandier's hedgehog (Echinocereus berlandieri), pitaya (Echinocereus enneacanthus var. brevispinus), Allicoche hedgehog cactus (Echinocereus papillosus), ladyfinger hedgehog (Echinocereus pentalophus), Dahlia cactus (Echinocereus poselgeri), Junior Tom Thumb cactus (Escobari emskoetteraana), Turk's head barrel cactus (Ferocactus hamatacanthus var. sinuatus), peyote (Lophophora williamsii), Heyder's pincushion cactus (Mammillaria heyderi), hair-covered cactus or Texas pincushion (Mammillaria prolifera var. texana), pale mammillaria (Mammillaria sphaerica), twisted rib cactus (Thelocactus setispinus) and several others. Some of these species have very limited distributions and are endemic to the region such as Astrophytum caput-medusae from Nuevo Leon, Mexico.

== Fauna ==
Mammals: This region once hosted an impressive number of carnivores but, most were very rare, or entirely extirpated by the early to mid 20th century. The gray wolf (Canis lupus) is extirpated and black bears (Ursus americanus) are now largely restricted to the Sierra de Picachos in Nuevo Leon, Mexico. The most recent records of the jaguar (Panthera onca) in Texas, USA are from the early 1950s, but the species still lingers, although at risk of extinction in Mexico. Similarly, jaguarondi (Herpailurus yaguarondi), ocelot (Leopardus pardalis), and margay (Leopardus wiedii) are all threatened or endangered in the US and Mexico. Some puma or mountain lion (Puma concolor), White-nosed coati (Nasua narica), and American Badger (Taxidea taxus) populations still persist, apparently in stable numbers in some remote areas, although the latter is considered a threatened species in Mexico. A few other species such as the Northern Raccoon (Procyon lotor), Coyote (Canis latrans), and to a lesser extent Bobcats (Lynx rufus) have adapted to human encroachment and development.

Other mammals found in the region include the collared peccary (Pecari tajacu), white-tailed deer (Odocoileus virginianus), black-tailed jackrabbit (Lepus californicus), nine-banded armadillo (Dasypus novemcinctus), Mexican long-tongued bat (Choeronycteris mexicana), and the southern yellow bat (Lasiurus ega). Rodents include the predatory northern grasshopper mouse (Onychomys leucogaster), the Mexican prairie dog (Cynomys mexicanus), Rio Grande ground squirrel (Ictidomys parvidens) and others such as Coue's rice rat (Oryzomys couesi), southern plains woodrat (Neotoma micropus), Mexican spiny pocket mouse (Liomys irroratus), and Merriam's pocket mouse (Perognathus merriami).

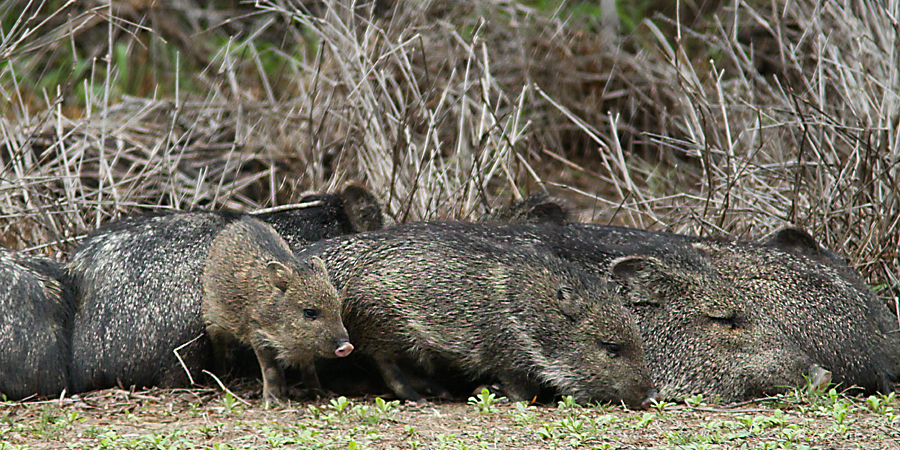
Collared peccary (Pecari tajacu), Hidalgo Co. Texas (4 Feb 2010).

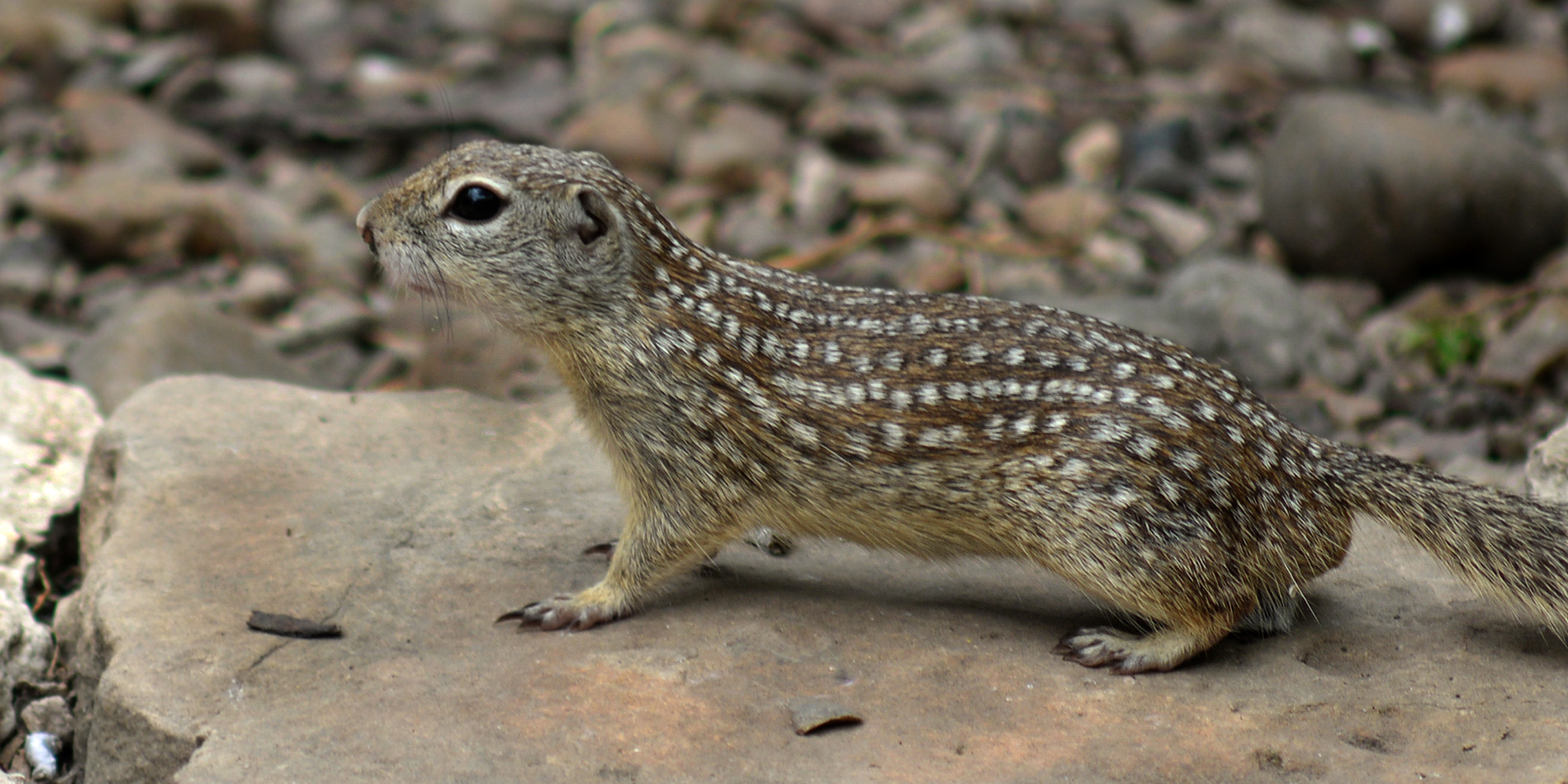
Rio Grande ground squirrel (Ictidomys parvidens) Cameron Co. Texas (12 April 2016).

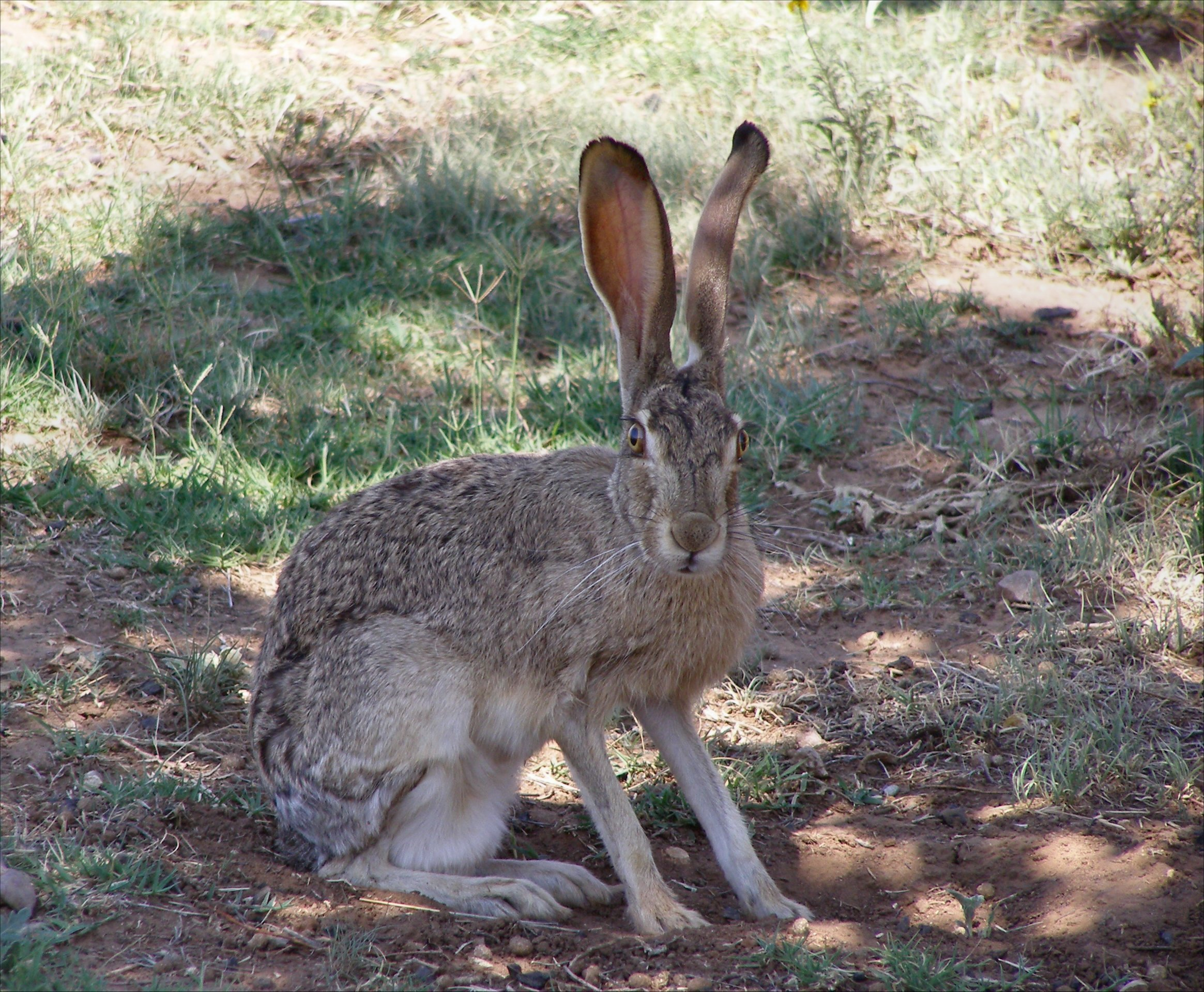
Black-tailed jackrabbit (Lepus californicus), Texas (13 June 2006).

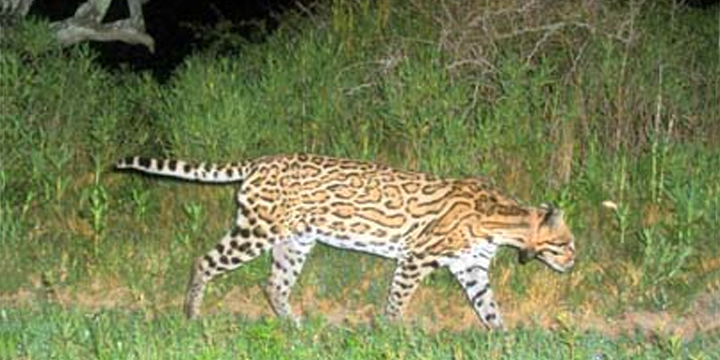
Ocelot (Leopardus pardalis) with tracking collar, Laguna Atascosa National Wildlife Refuge, Cameron Co. Texas.

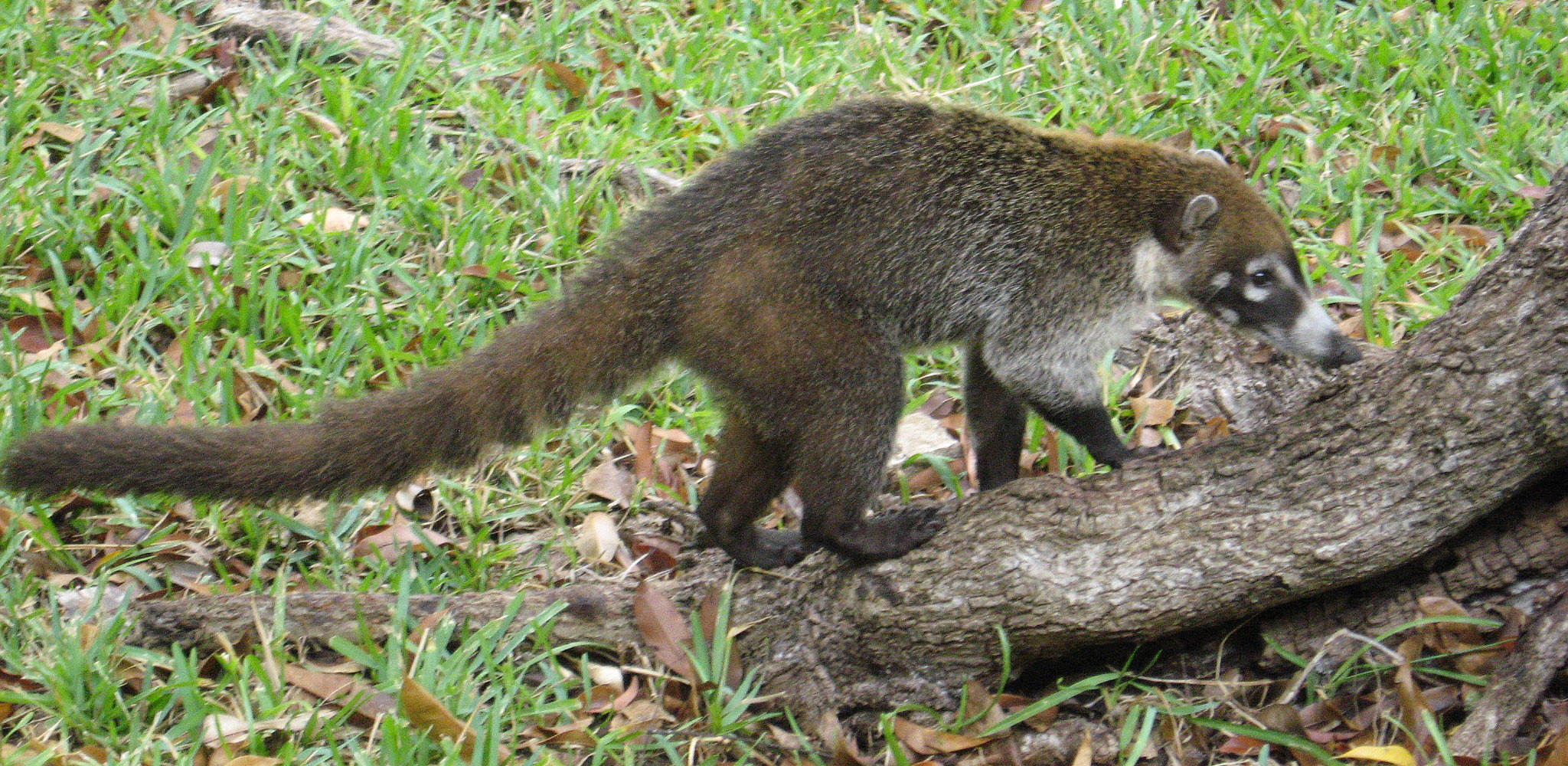
White-nosed coati (Nasua narica), Mexico (5 Sept 2009).

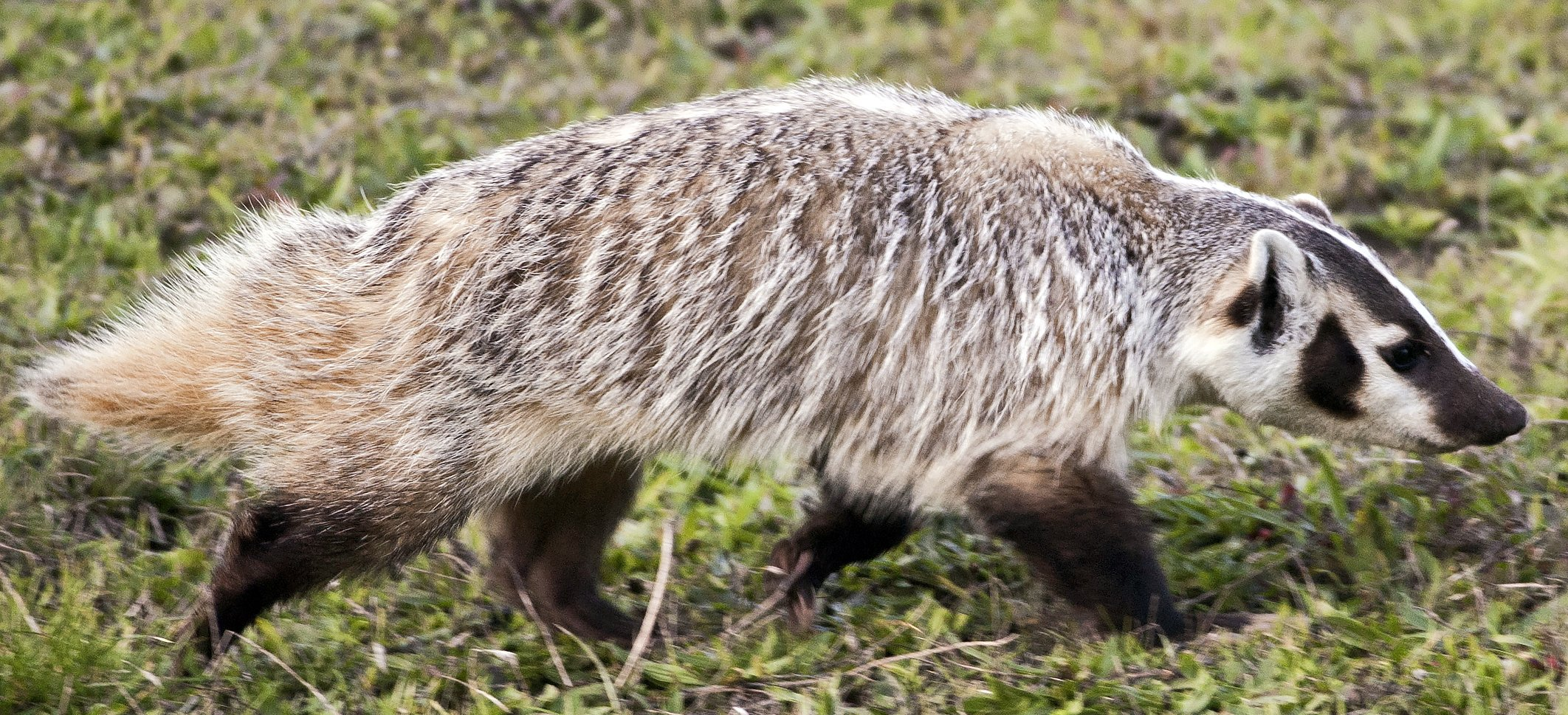
American badger (Taxidea taxus), Marin Co., California (25 Nov 2007).

Birds: The southern part of the ecoregion is an Endemic Bird Area and is home to the red-crowned amazon (Amazona viridigenalis), tawny-collared nightjar (Caprimulgus salvini), Tamaulipas crow (Corvus imparatus), long-billed thrasher (Toxostoma longirostre), Altamira yellowthroat (Geothlypis flavovelata), and crimson-collared grosbeak (Rhodothraupis celaeno). Other species occurring in this region include the white-tailed hawk (Buteo albicaudatus), plain chachalaca (Ortalis vetula), green parakeet (Psittacara holochlorus), buff-bellied hummingbird (Amazilia yucatanensis), Couch's kingbird (Tyrannus couchii), and Audubon's oriole (Icterus graduacauda) as well as wide-ranging tropical species such as the green jay (Cyanocorax yncas), least grebe (Tachybaptus dominicus), Ferruginous pygmy owl (Glaucidium brasilianum), ringed kingfisher (Megaceryle torquata), and the great kiskadee (Pitangus sulphuratus).

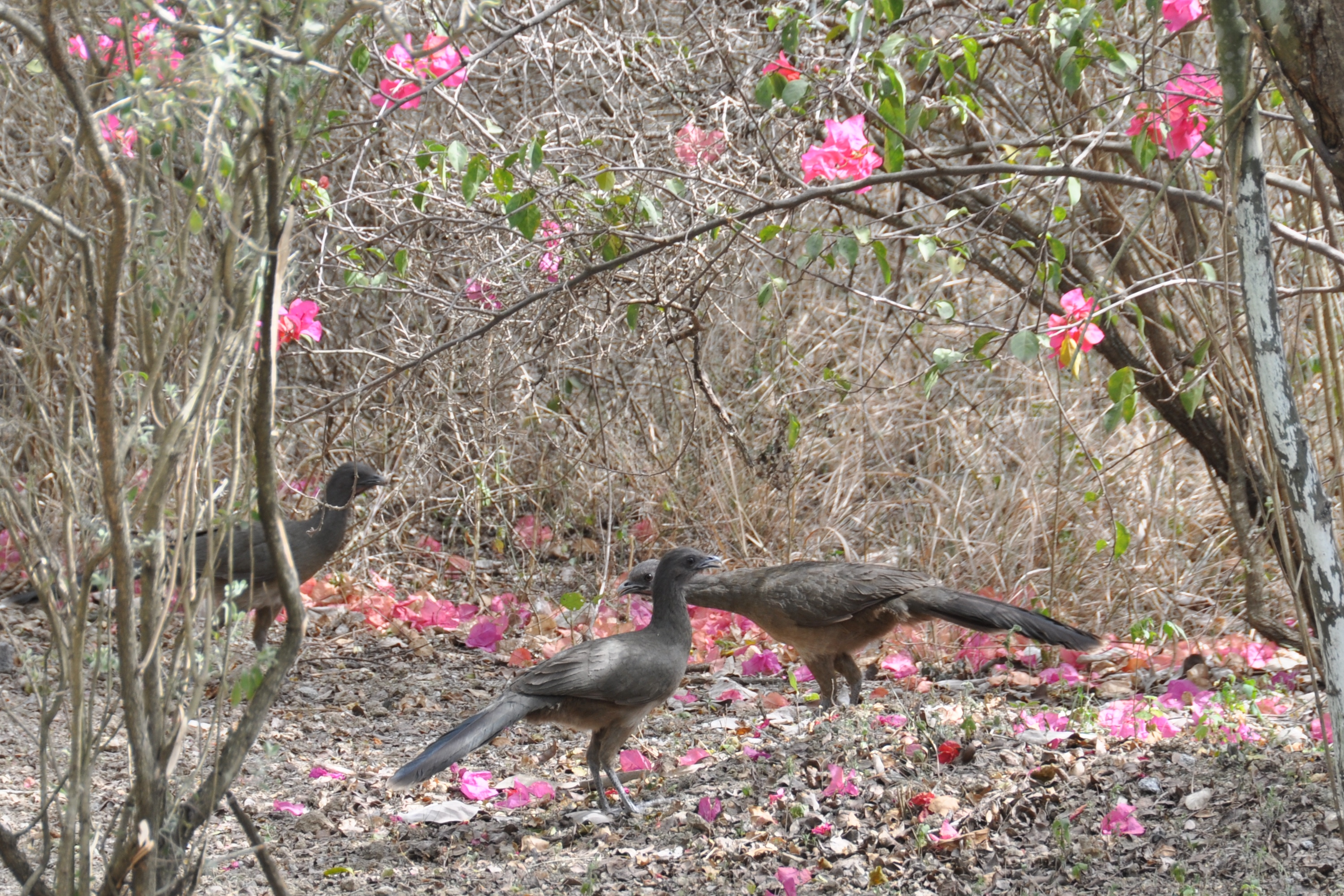
Plain chachalaca (Ortalis vetula), Municipality of Montemorelos, Nuevo León (9 April 2009).

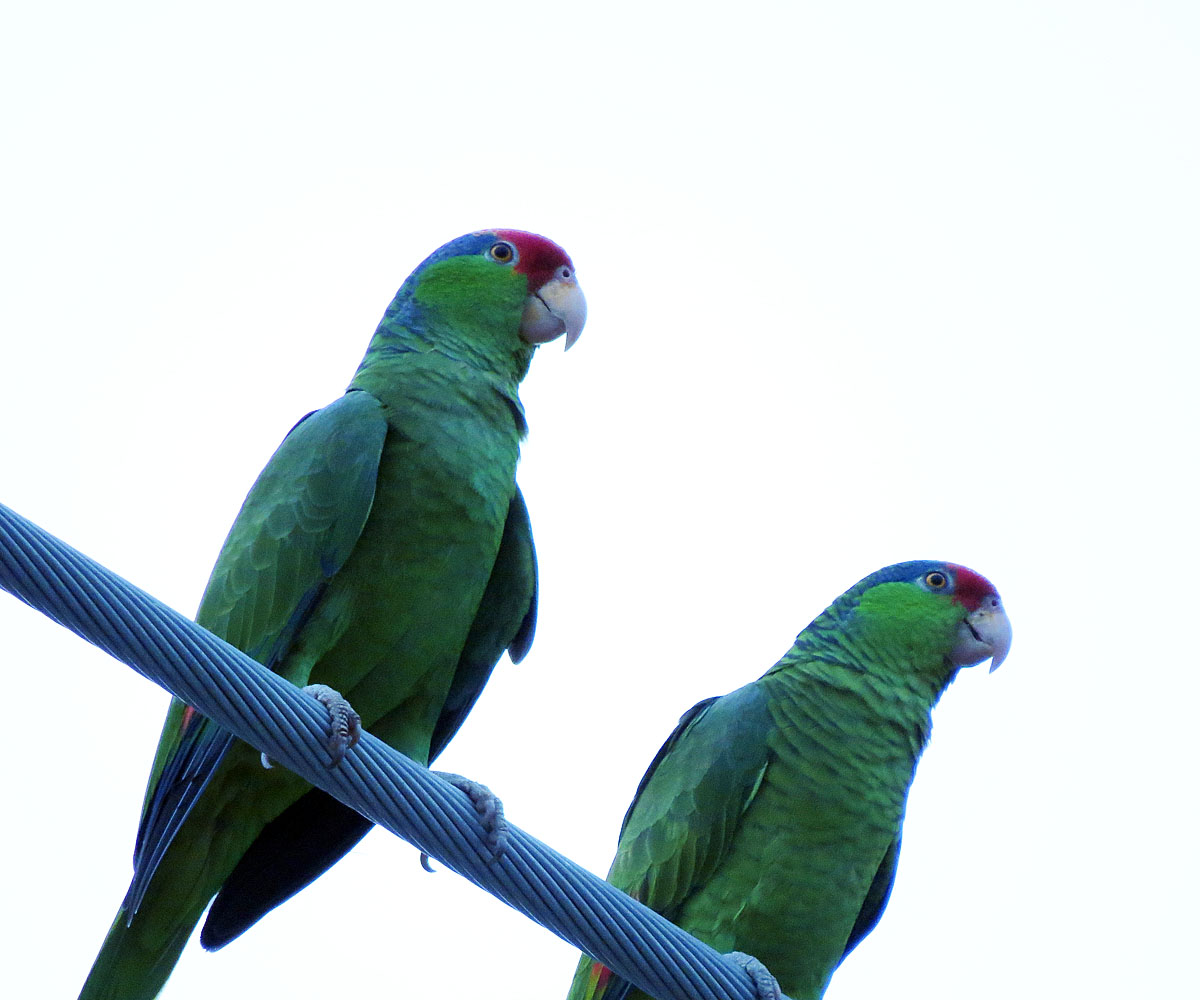
Red-crowned Amazon (Amazona viridigenalis), Cameron Co. Texas (15 Mar 2016).

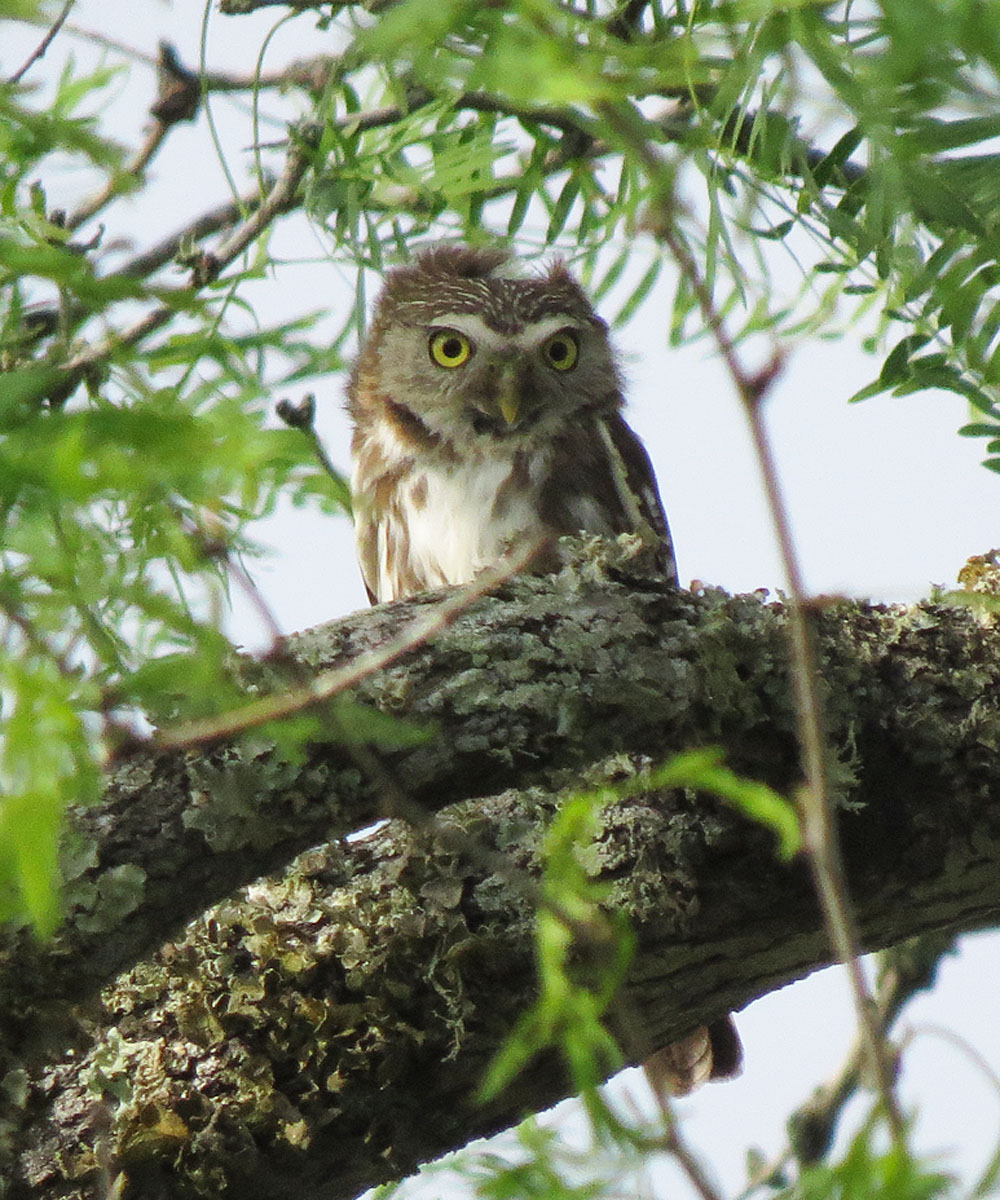
Ferruginous pygmy owl (Glaucidium brasilianum), King Ranch, TX (15 Mar 2016).

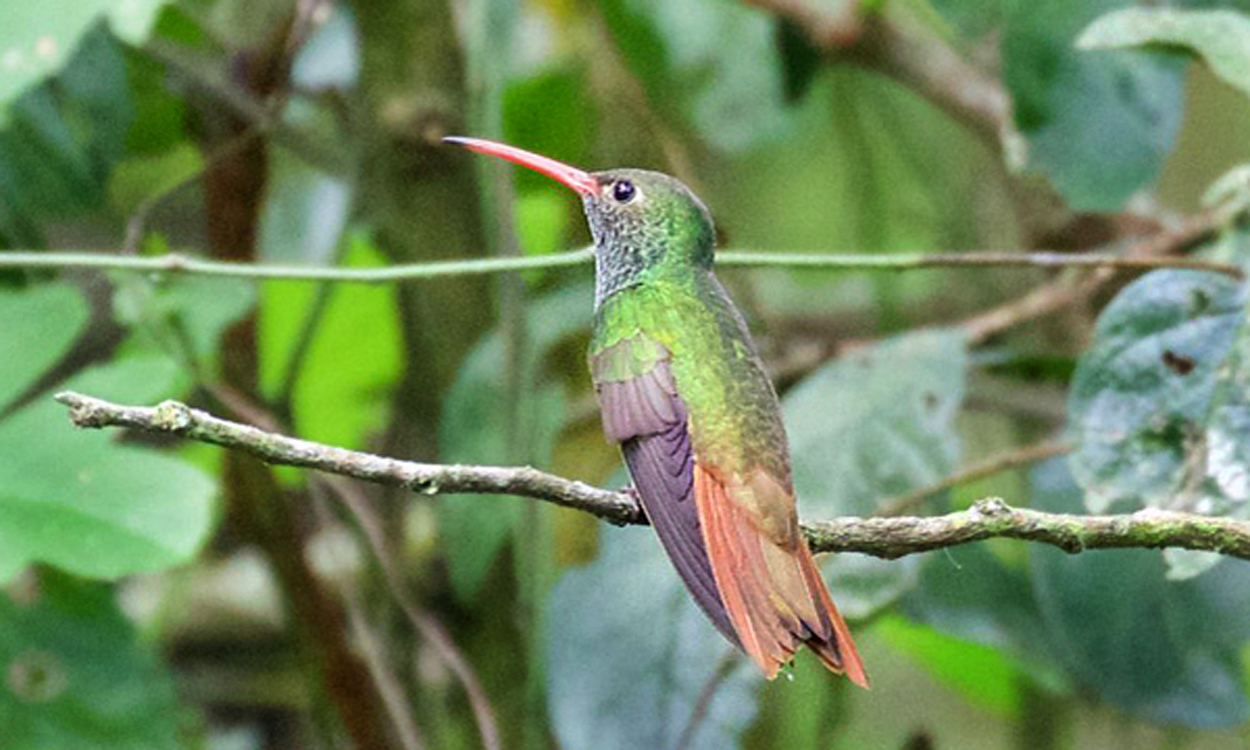
Buff-bellied hummingbird (Amazilia yucatanensis), Sabal Palm Sanctuary, Cameron Co. Texas (21 Sept. 2015).

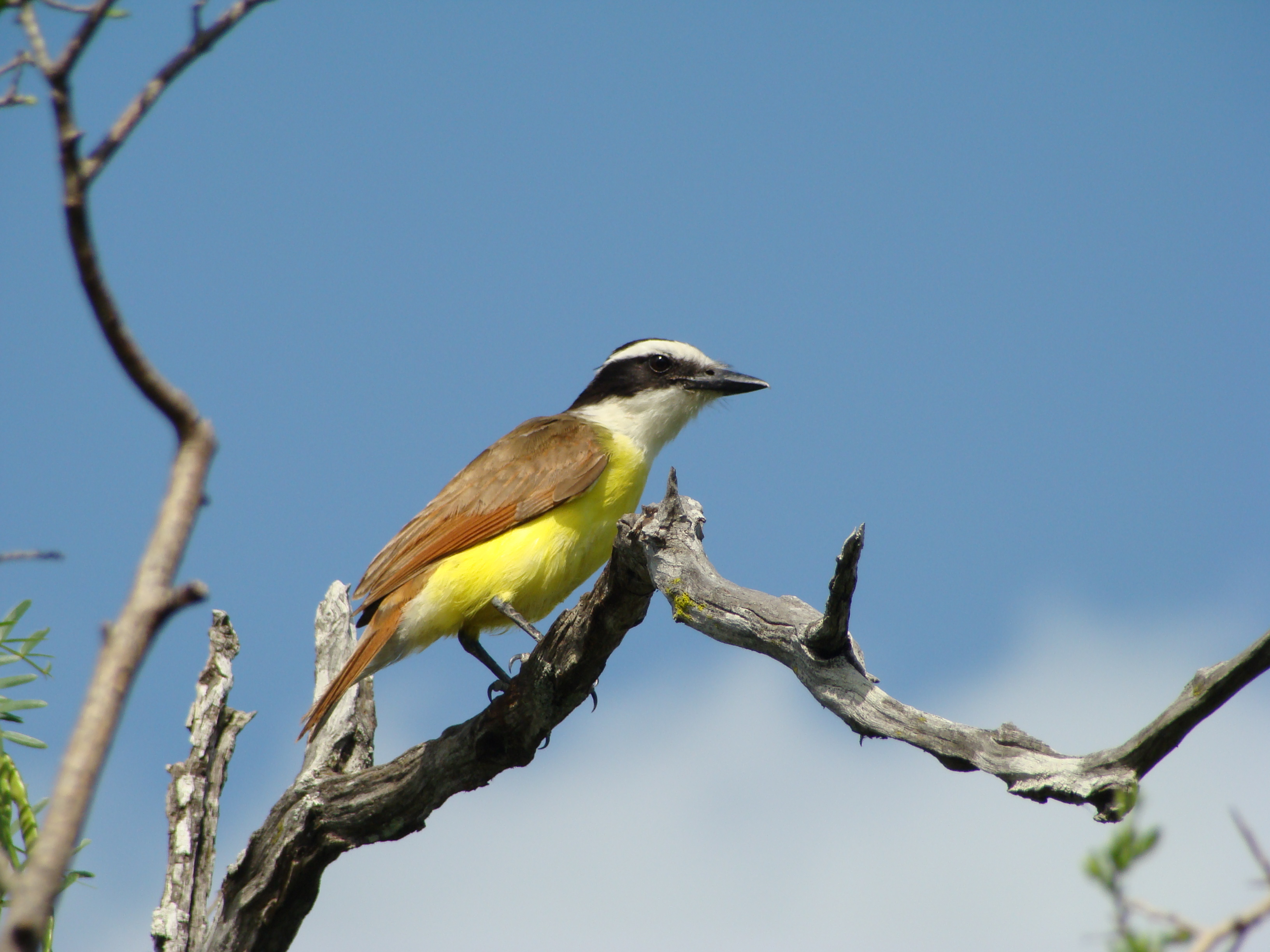
Great kiskadee (Pitangus sulphuratus). Bee Co., Texas (3 July 2011).

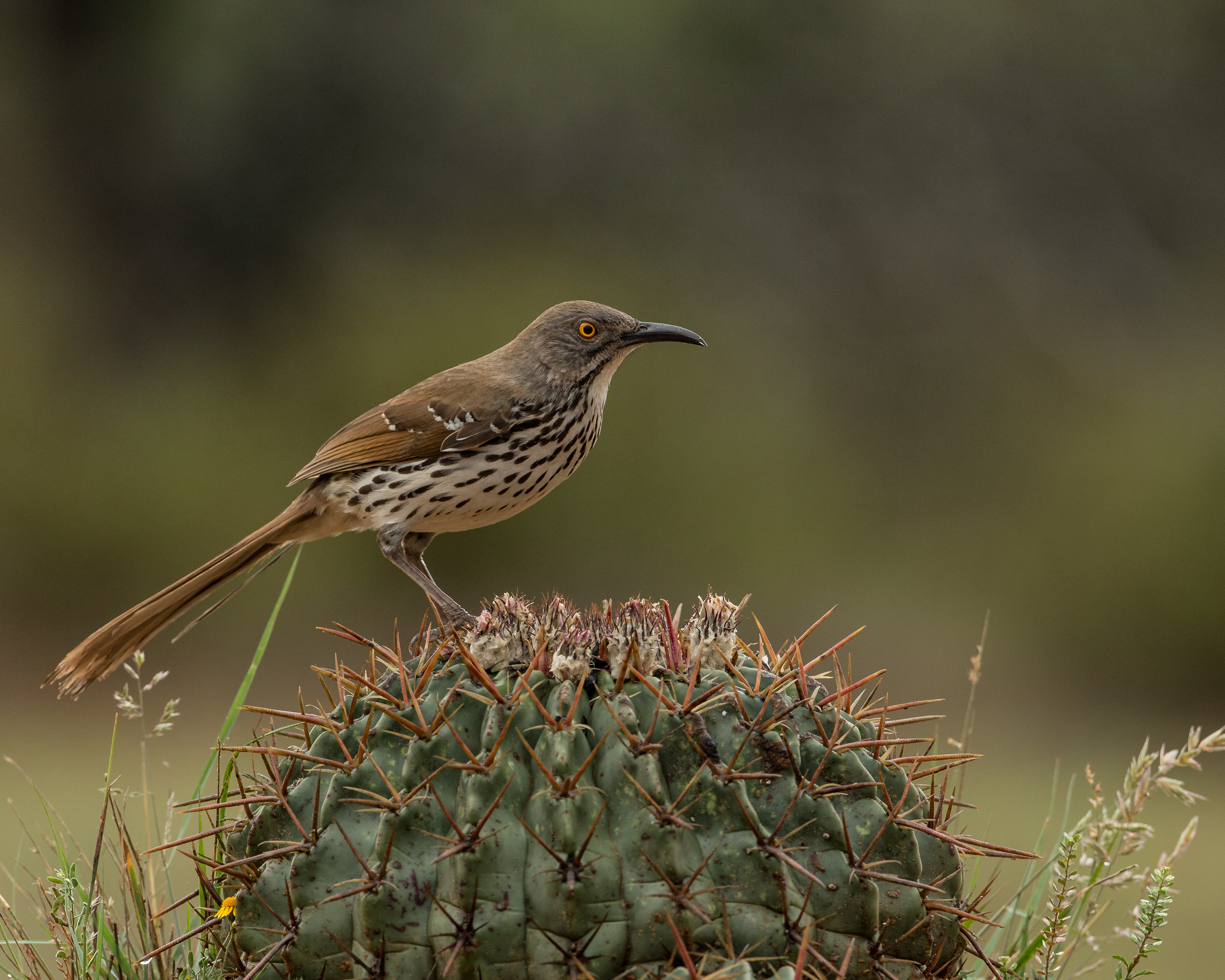
Long-billed thrasher (Toxostoma longirostre), Texas, USA (20 Feb. 2017).

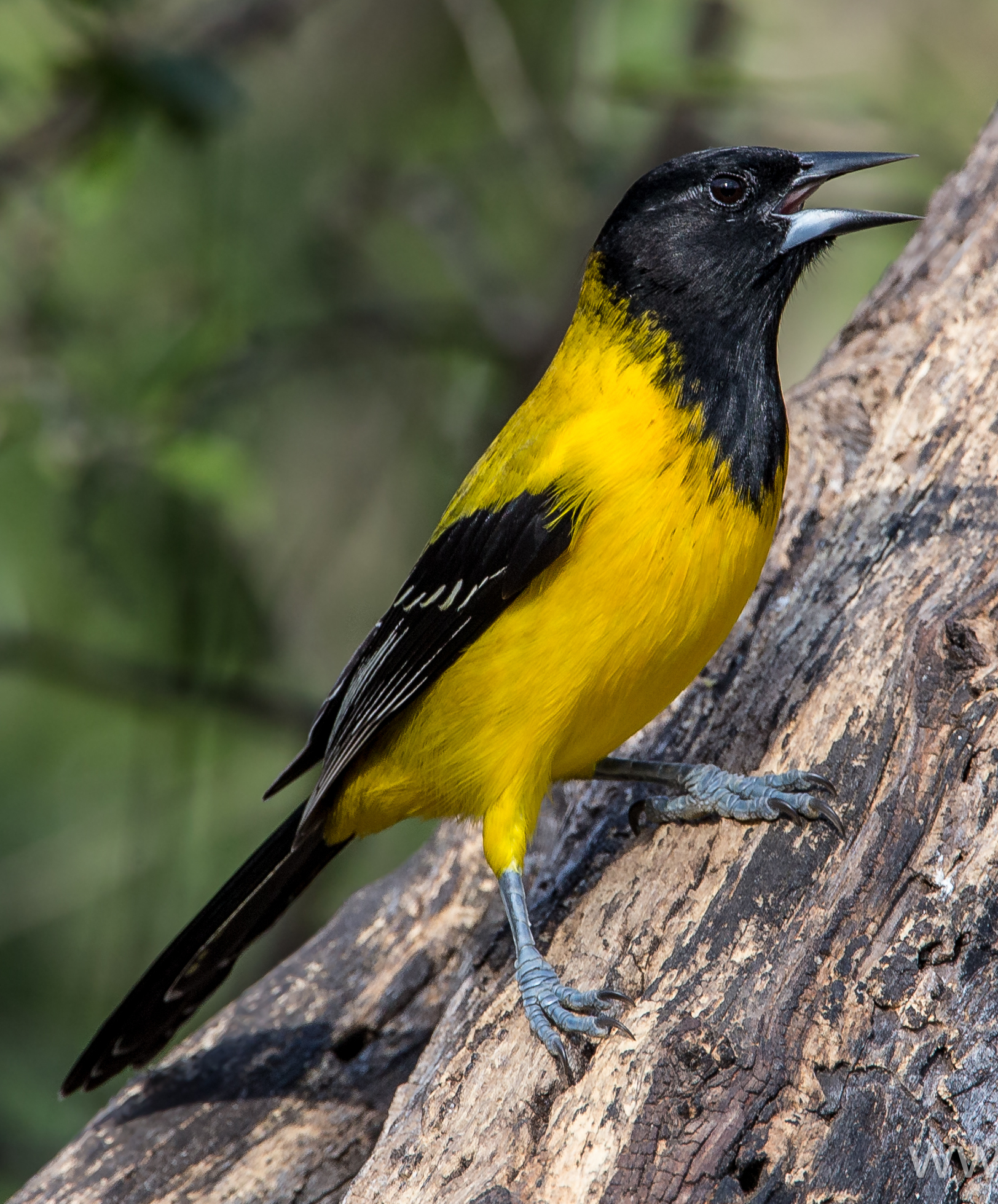
Audubon's oriole (Icterus graduacauda), Starr Co. Texas (1 Feb 2014).

Reptiles: The American alligator (Alligator mississippiensis) and the red-eared slider (Trachemys scripta) occur in the north of this region and the Morelet's crocodile (Crocodylus moreletii) and Mesoamerican slider (Trachemys venusta) in the south. Other turtles such as the Mexican box turtle (Terrapene mexicana), Rio Grande cooter (Pseudemys gorzugi), spiny softshell (Apalone spinifera), and the yellow mud turtle (Kinosternon flavescens) occur there. The geographic distribution of the Texas tortoise (Gopherus berlandieri) nearly matches that of the Tamaulipan mezquital ecoregion. The Laredo striped whiptail (Aspidoscelis laredoensis) is a species complex of all female lizards that reproduce by parthenogenesis that is endemic to this region. The reticulate collared lizard (Crotaphytus reticulatus) is also endemic. Other representative lizards include the Texas banded gecko (Coleonyx brevis), four-lined skink (Plestiodon tetragrammus), common spotted whiptail (Aspidoscelis gularis), keeled earless lizard (Holbrookia propinqua), Texas horned lizard (Phrynosoma cornutum), blue spiny lizard (Sceloporus cyanogenys), and the northern rose-belly lizard (Sceloporus variabilis marmoratus), regarded by some as a full species (Sceloporus marmoratus). Some representative snakes of the Tamaulipan mezquital include the Tamaulipan hook-nose snake (Ficimia streckeri), Mexican milksnake (Lampropeltis annulata), and Schott's whipsnake (Masticophis schotti). More wide-ranging species include the Great Plains ratsnake (Pantherophis emoryi), gopher snake (Pituophis catenifer), long-nose snake (Rhinocheilus lecontei), and eastern patch-nose snake (Salvadora grahamiae). Some tropical species reaching the northern margin of their ranges including the regal black-striped snake (Coniophanes imperialis), Central American indigo snake (Drymarchon melanurus), speckled racer (Drymobius margaritiferus), northern cat-eyed Snake (Leptodeira septentrionalis). Venoumous snakes include the Texas coralsnake (Micrurus tener) and western diamond-back rattlesnake (Crotalus atrox), with the western massasauga rattlesnake (Sistrurus tergeminus) occurring in the north and the Totonacan rattlesnake (Crotalus totonacus) occurring in the south.

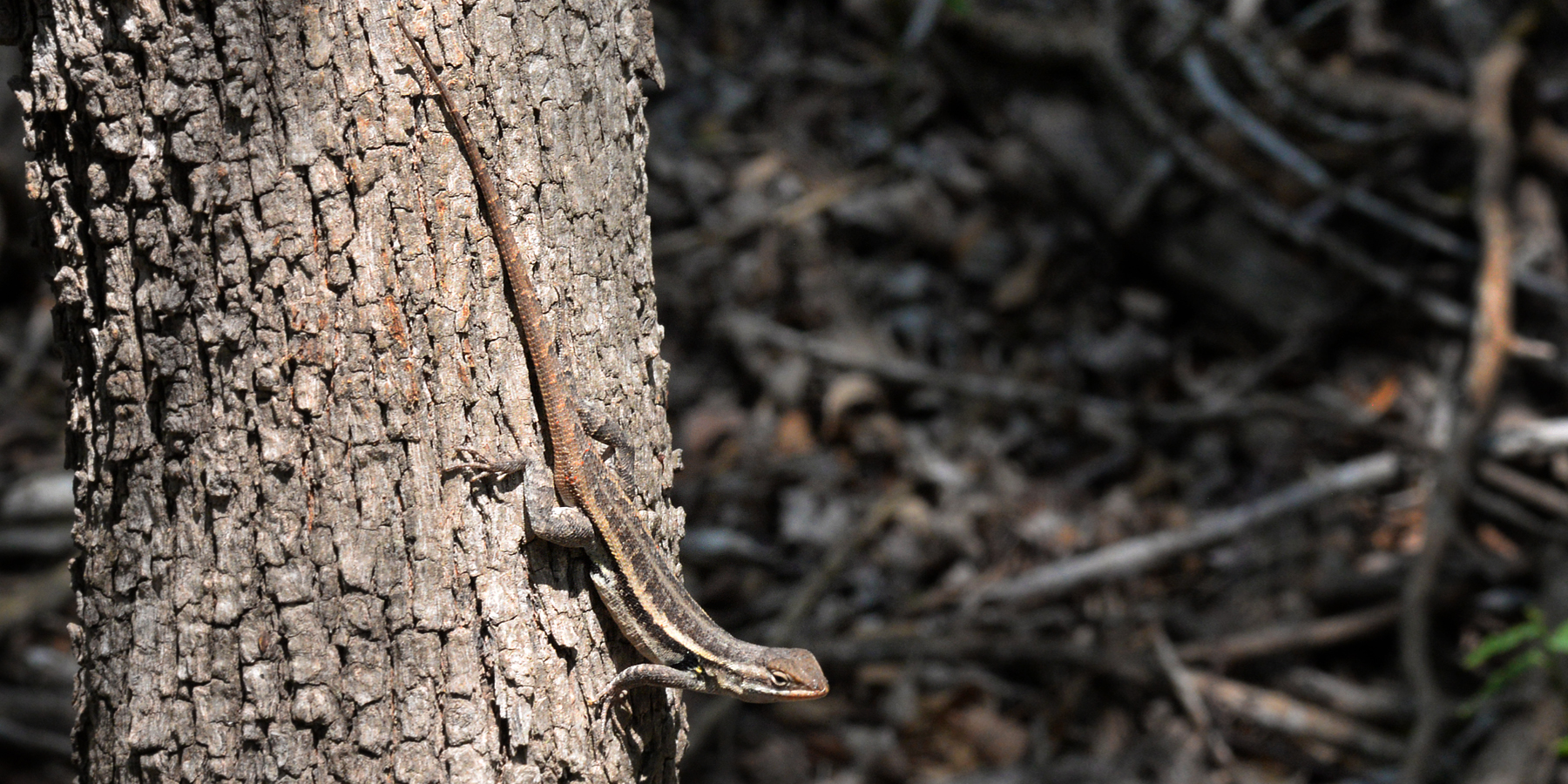
Rose-bellied lizard (Sceloporus variabilis marmoratus), Hidalgo County, Texas, USA (14 April 2016).

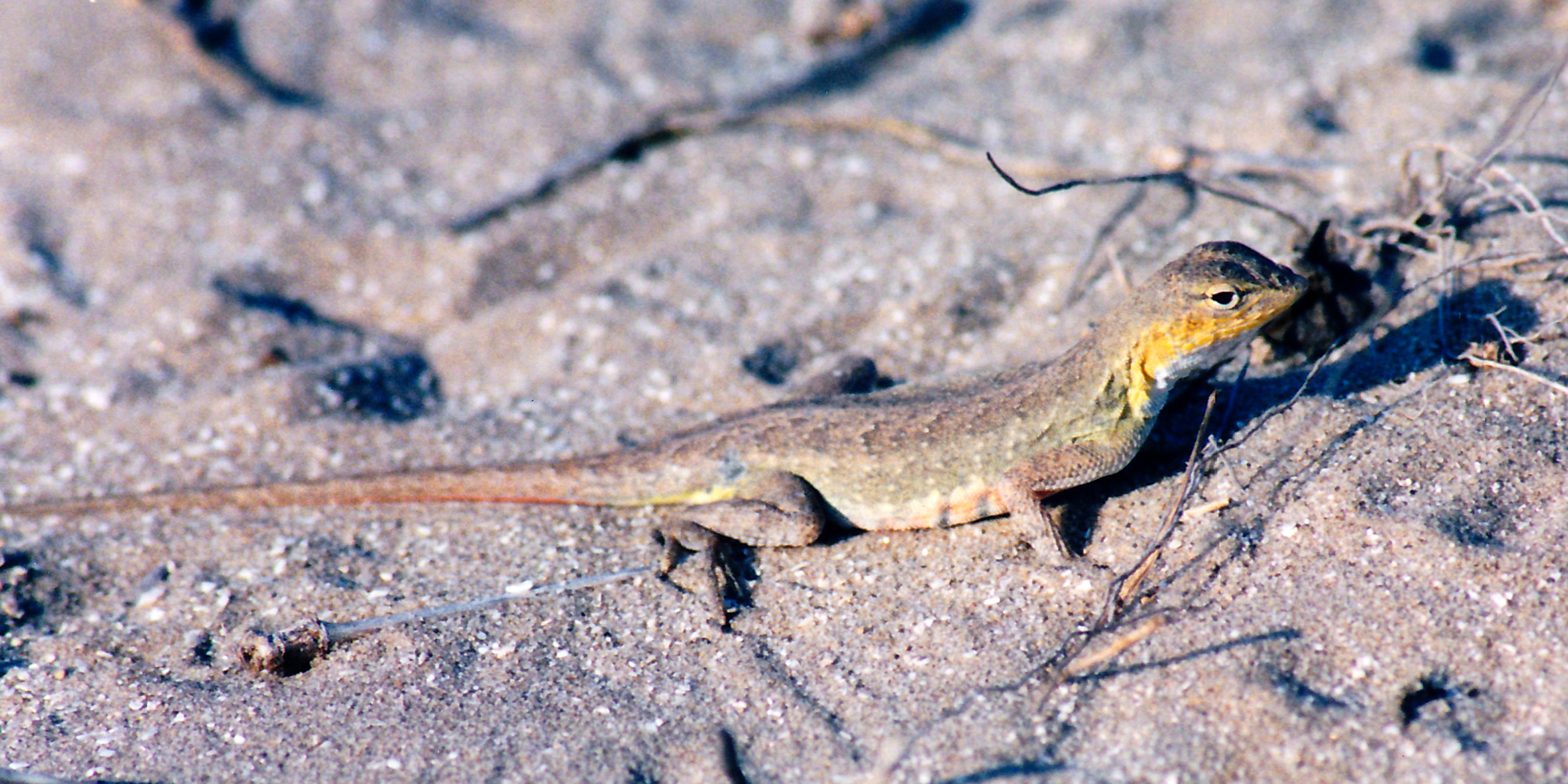
Keeled earless lizard (Holbrookia propinqua), municipality of Soto La Marina, Tamaulipas, Mexico (20 May 2002).

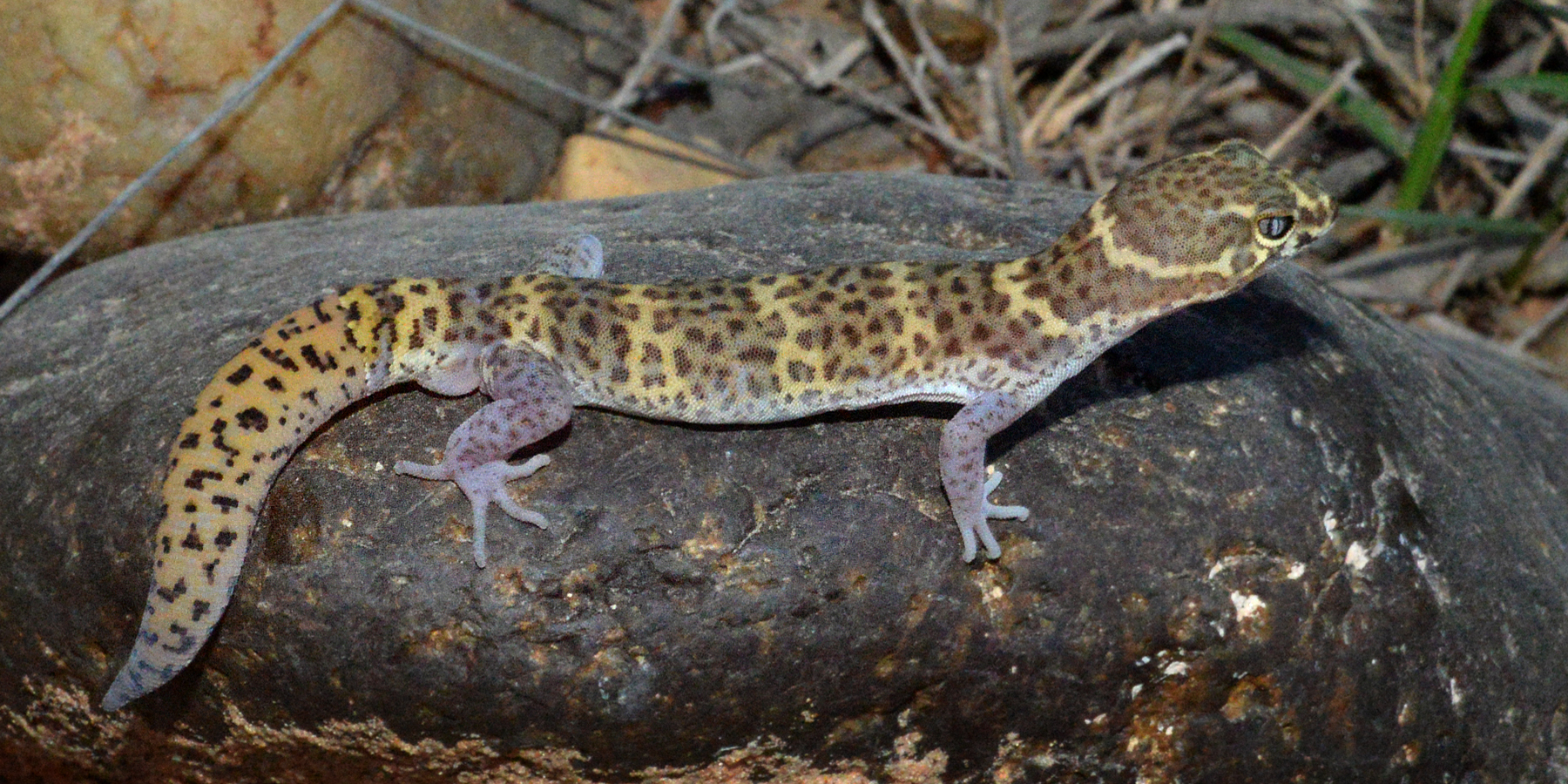
Texas banded gecko (Coleonyx brevis), Webb County Texas, USA (10 June 2016).

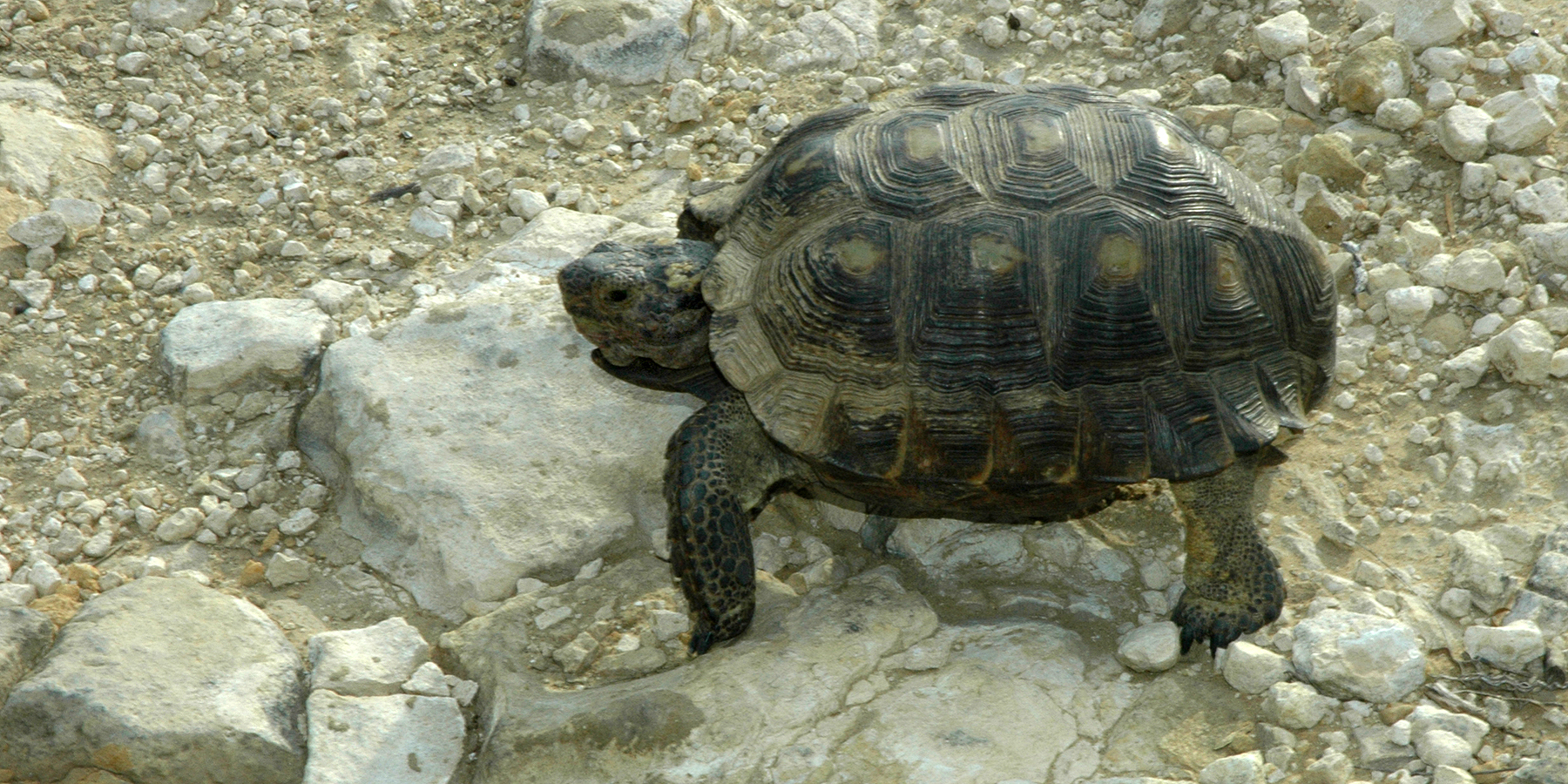
Texas Tortoise (Gopherus berlandieri), northern Tamaulipas, Mexico (9 July 2007).

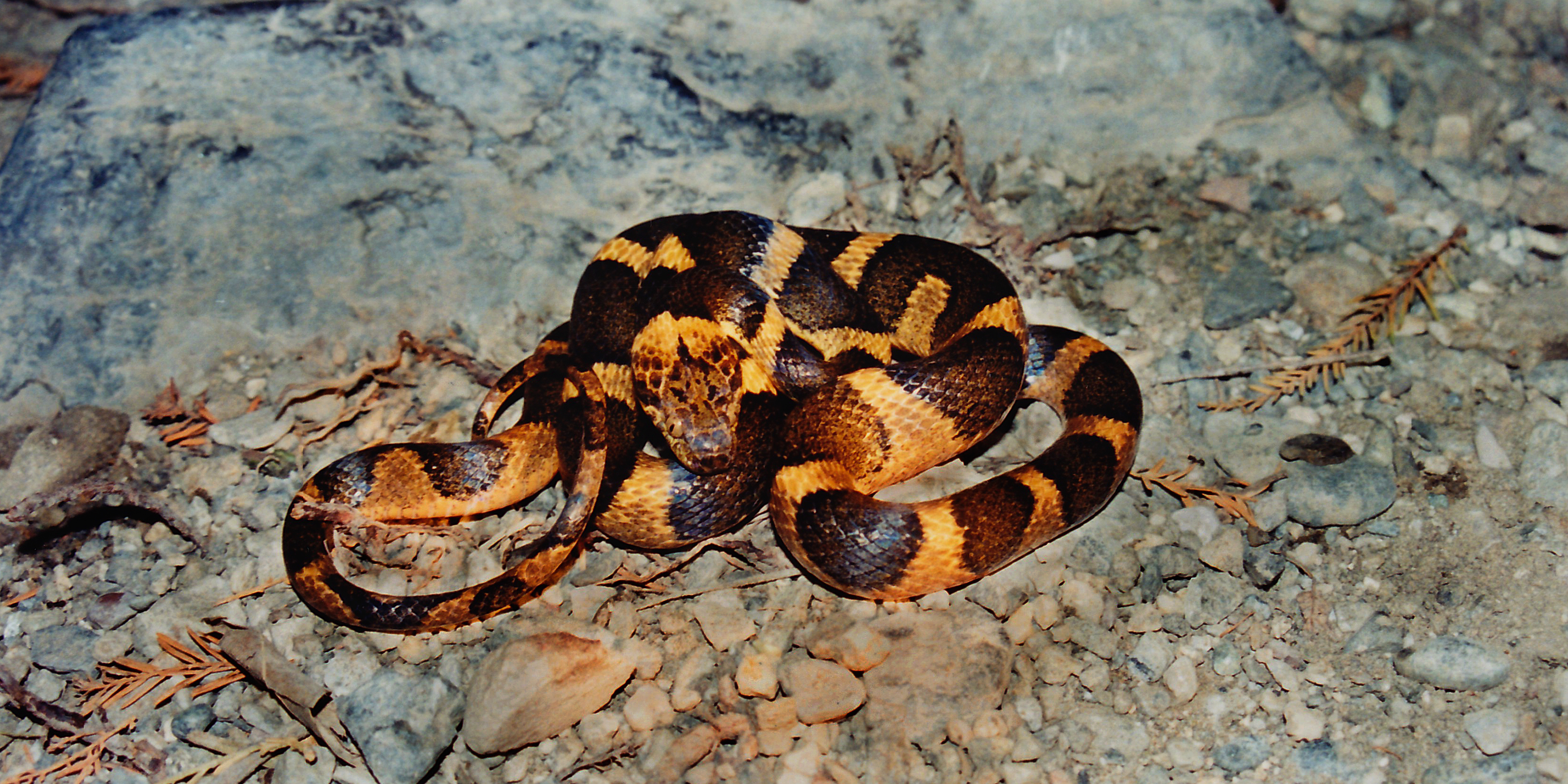
Northern cat-eyed snake (Leptodeira septentrionalis), Municipality of Victoria, Tamaulipas, Mexico (7 Aug 2003).

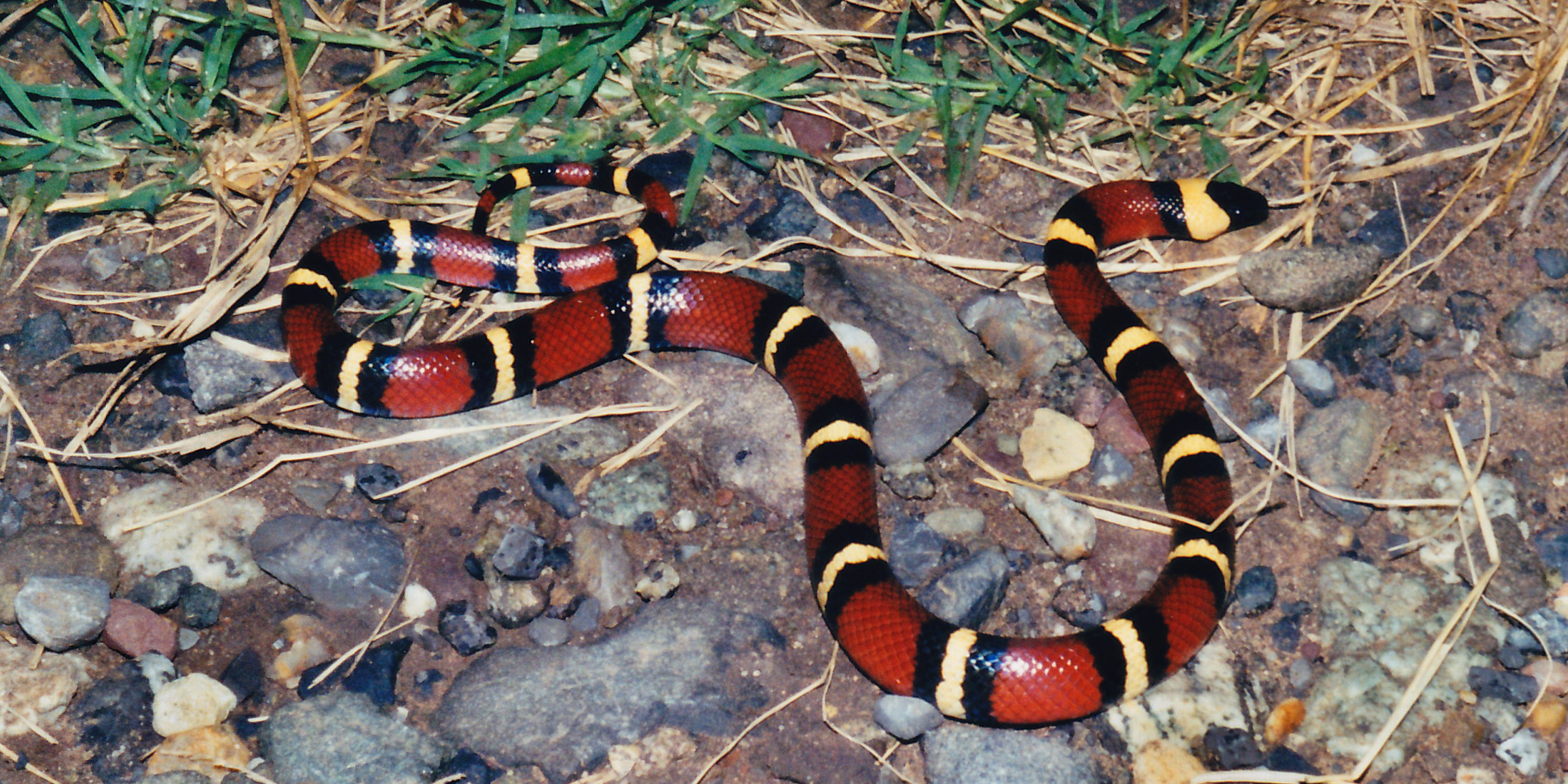
Mexican milksnake (Lampropeltis annulata), Municipality of Victoria, Tamaulipas (30 Oct 2003).

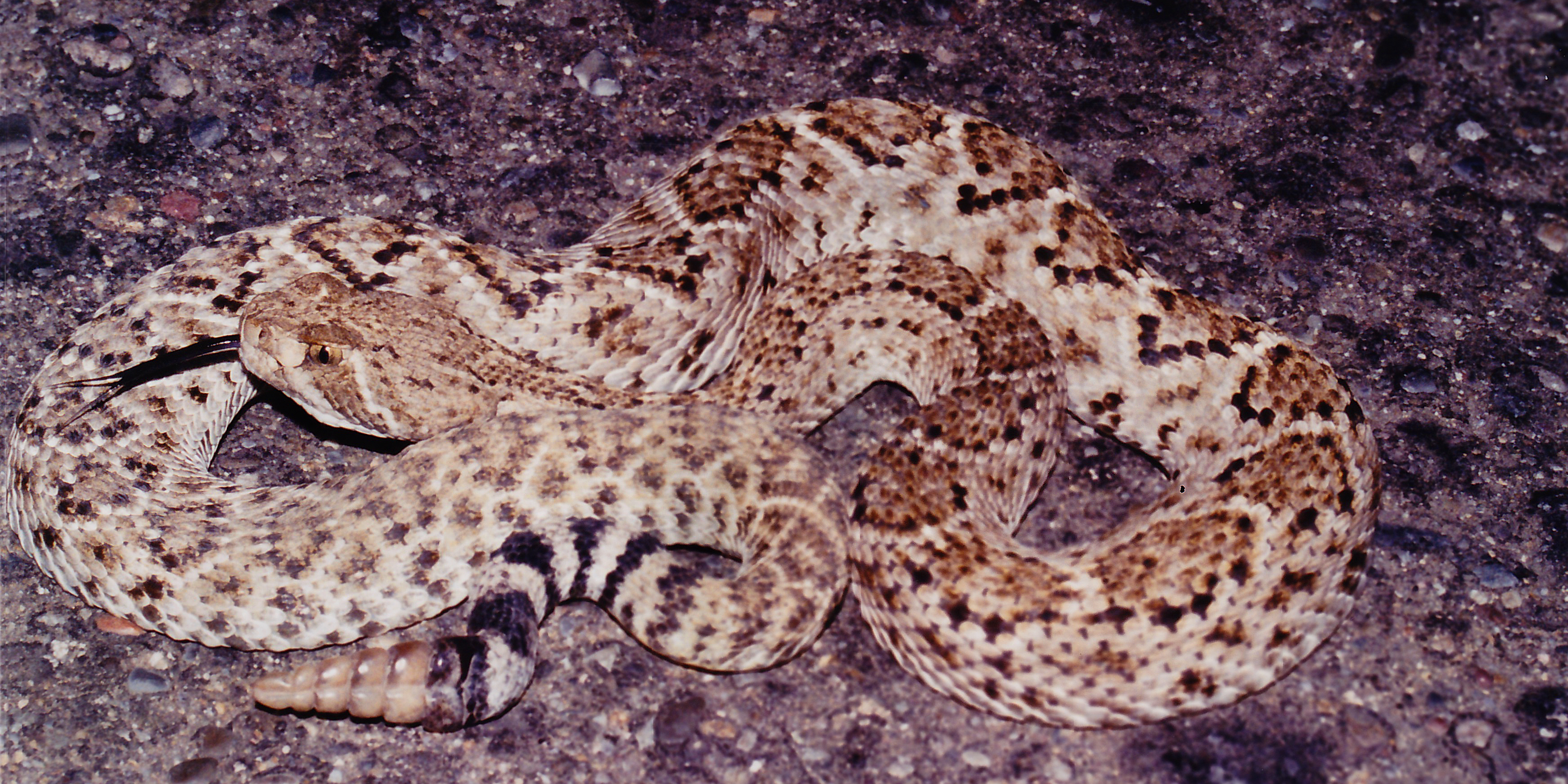
Western diamondback rattlesnake (Crotalus atrox), Municipality of Padilla, Tamaulipas, Mexico (29 May 2004).

Amphibians: In spite of the semi-arid environment, enough wetlands are present to support salamanders such as the black-spotted newt (Notophthalmus meridionalis) and the lesser siren (Siren intermedia). A second species of siren is known to occur in the lower Rio Grande, thought to be a distant and isolated population of the greater siren (Siren lacertina) by some, or an undescribed species by others. The Rio Grande leopard frog (Lithobates berlandieri) and western narrow-mouthed toad (Gastrophryne olivacea) occur in the region along with several toads (Bufonidae) inhabiting the thorn scrub and grasslands including the green toad (Anaxyrus debilis), Texas toad (Anaxyrus speciosus), Gulf Coast toad (Incilius nebulifer), and cane toad (Rhinella horribilis). Many tropical species reach the northern limits of their distributions there such as the Mexican treefrog (Smilisca baudinii), white-lipped frog (Leptodactylus fragilis), sheep frog (Hypopachus variolosus), and the unusual burrowing toad (Rhinophrynus dorsalis), so unique it is classified in a family (Rhinophrynidae) by itself.

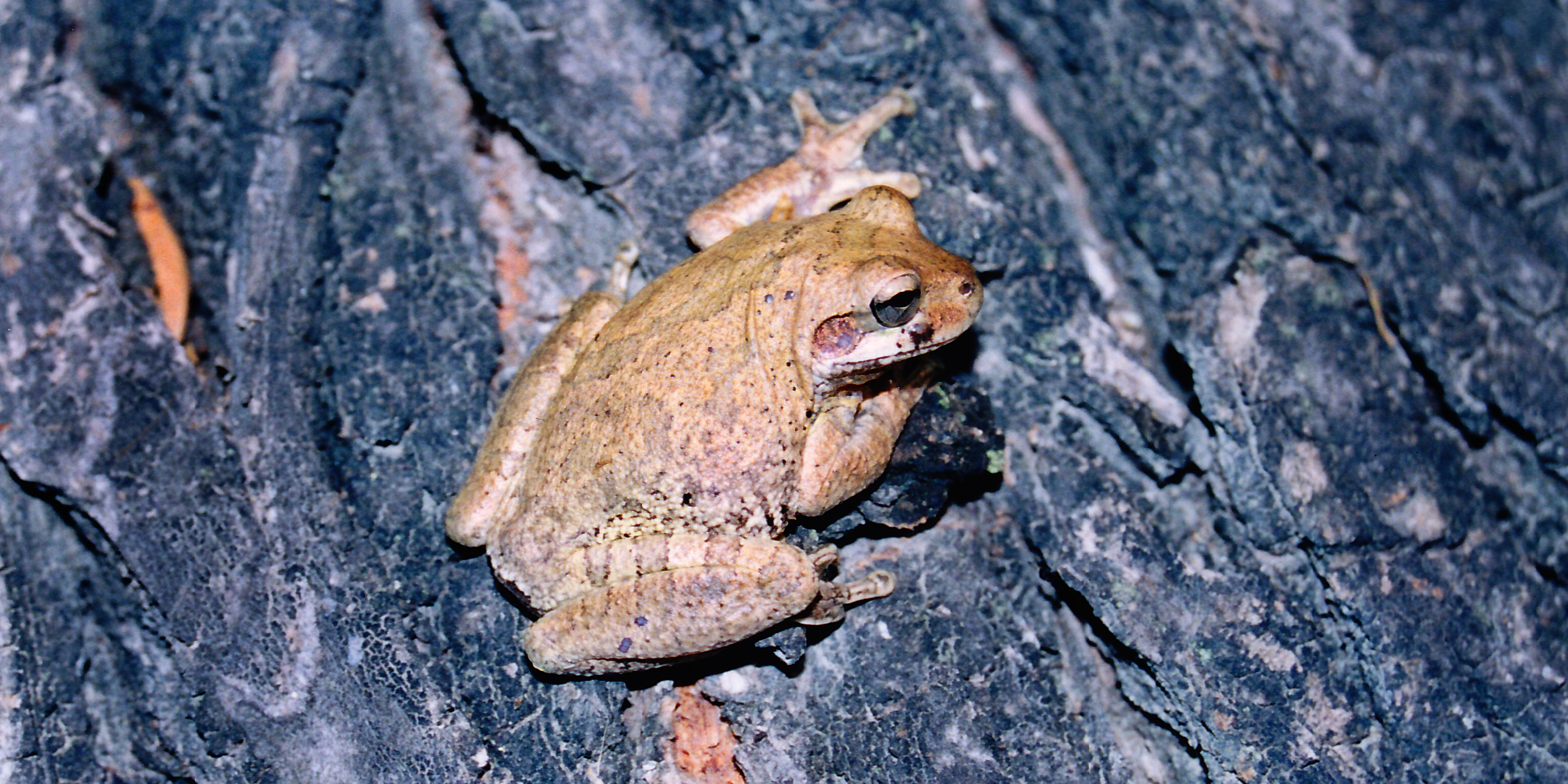
Mexican Treefrog (Smilisca baudinii), Municipality of Abasolo, Tamaulipas, Mexico (18 May 2002).

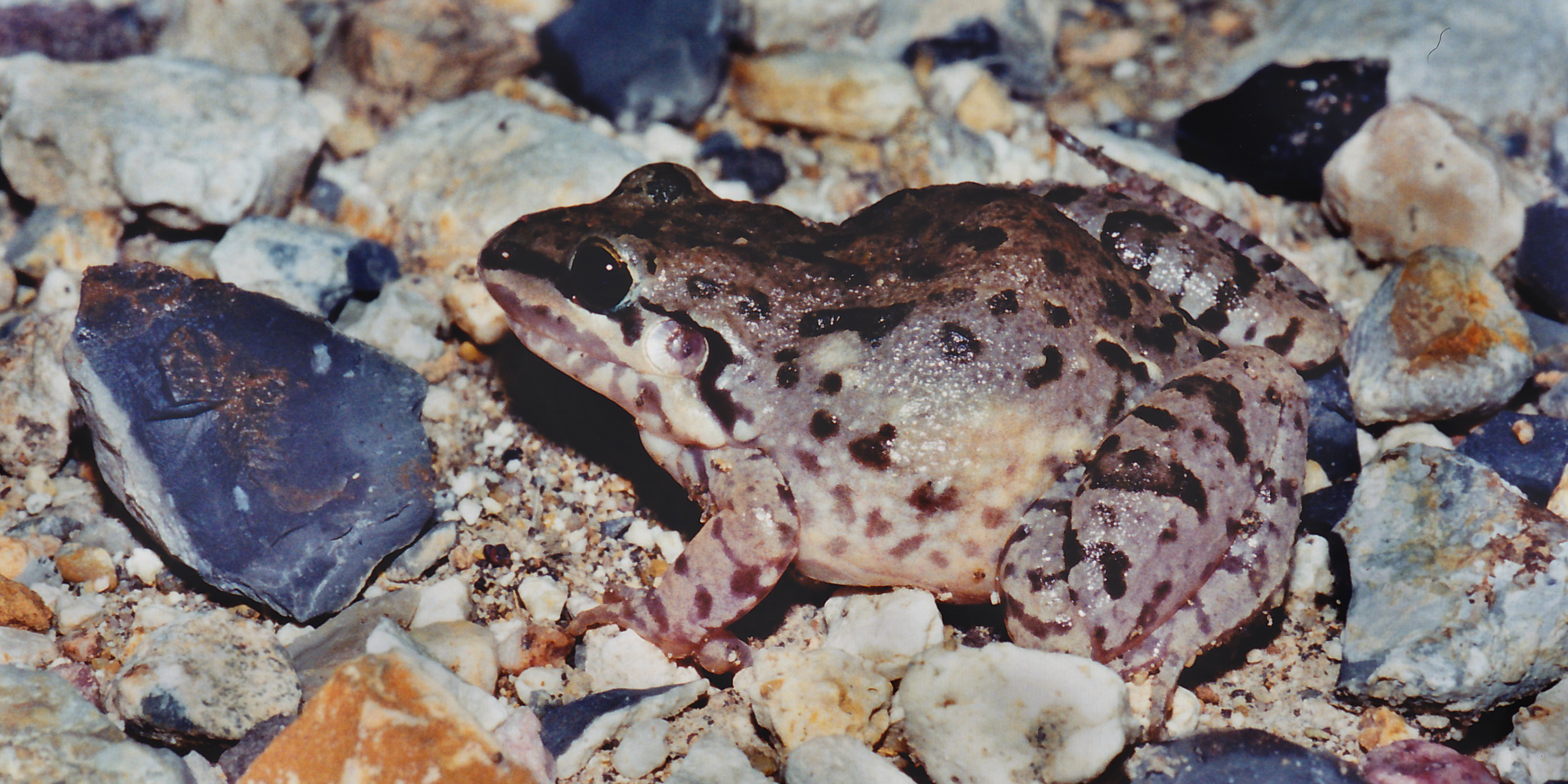
White-lipped Frog (Leptodactylus fragilis) Municipality of Victoria, Tamaulipas, Mexico (12 August 2003).

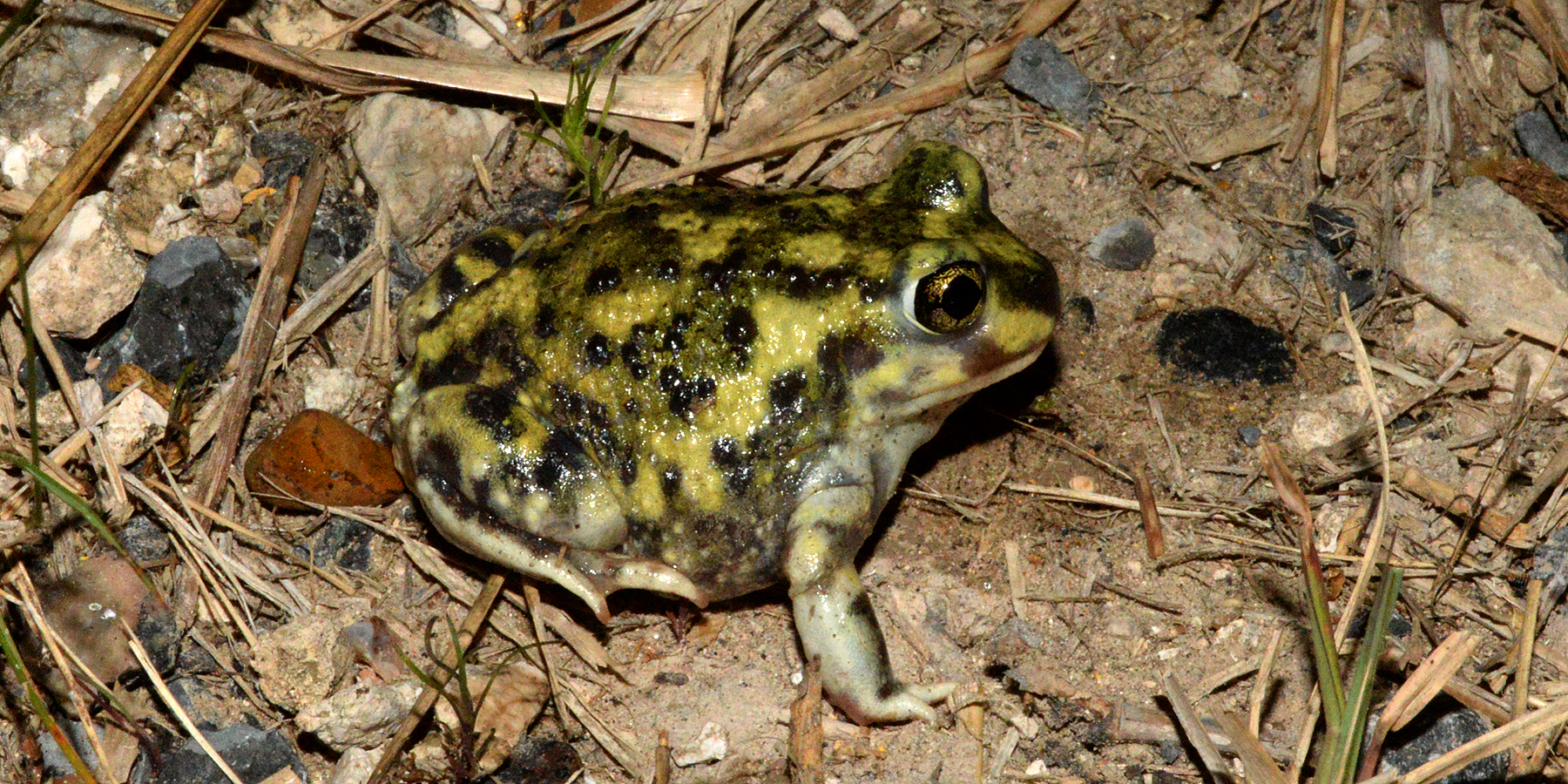
Couch's Spadefoot (Scaphiopus couchii), Cameron County, Texas, USA (11 April 2016).

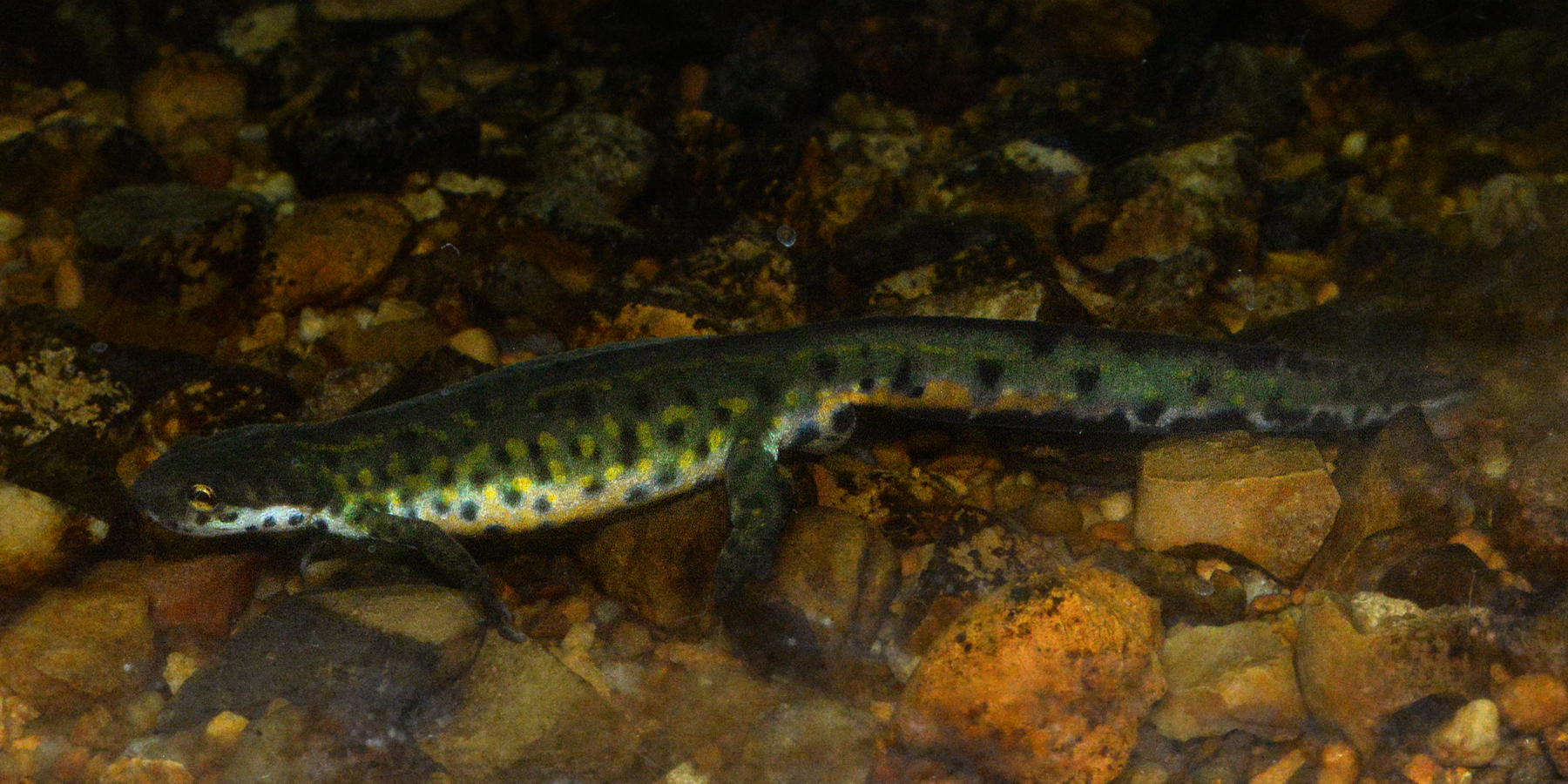
Black-spotted Newt (Notophthalmus meridionalis), Santa Ana NWR, Hidalgo Co, Texas (14 April 2016).

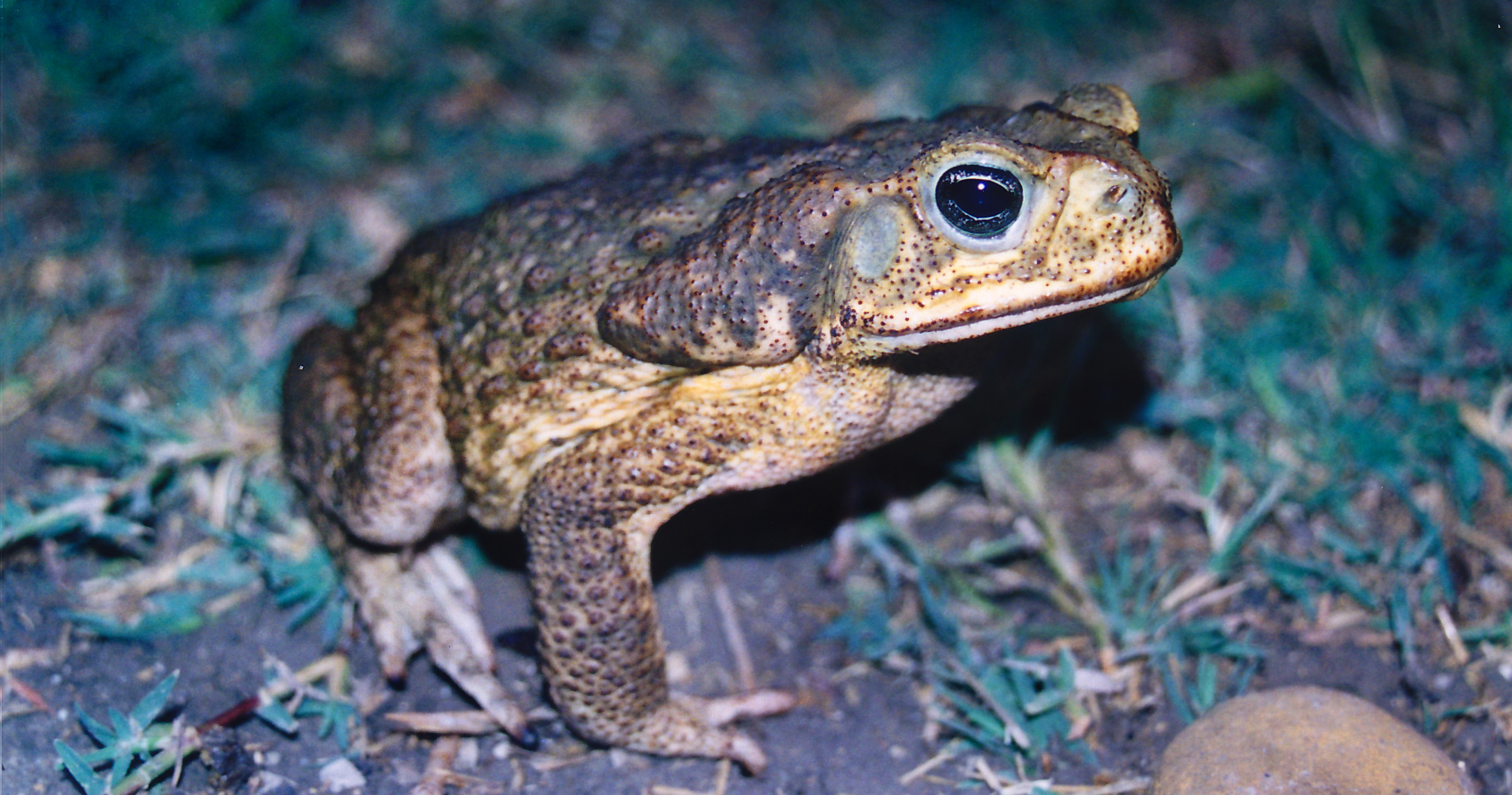
Cane Toad (Rhinella horribilis), Municipality of Soto La Marina, Tamaulipas, Mexico (17 May 2002).

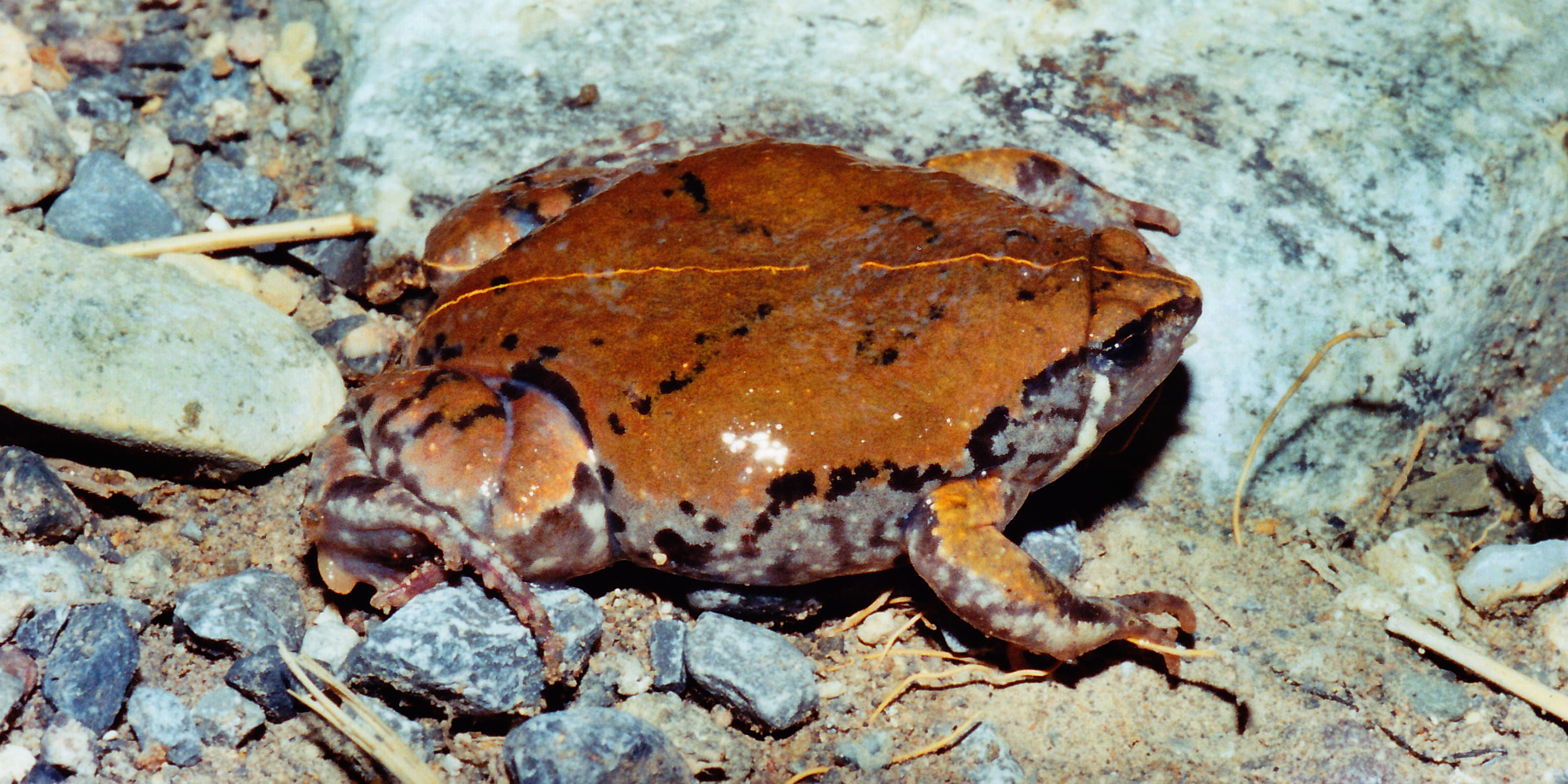
Sheep Frog (Hypopachus variolosus), Municipality of Victoria, Tamaulipas, Mex (12 August 2003).

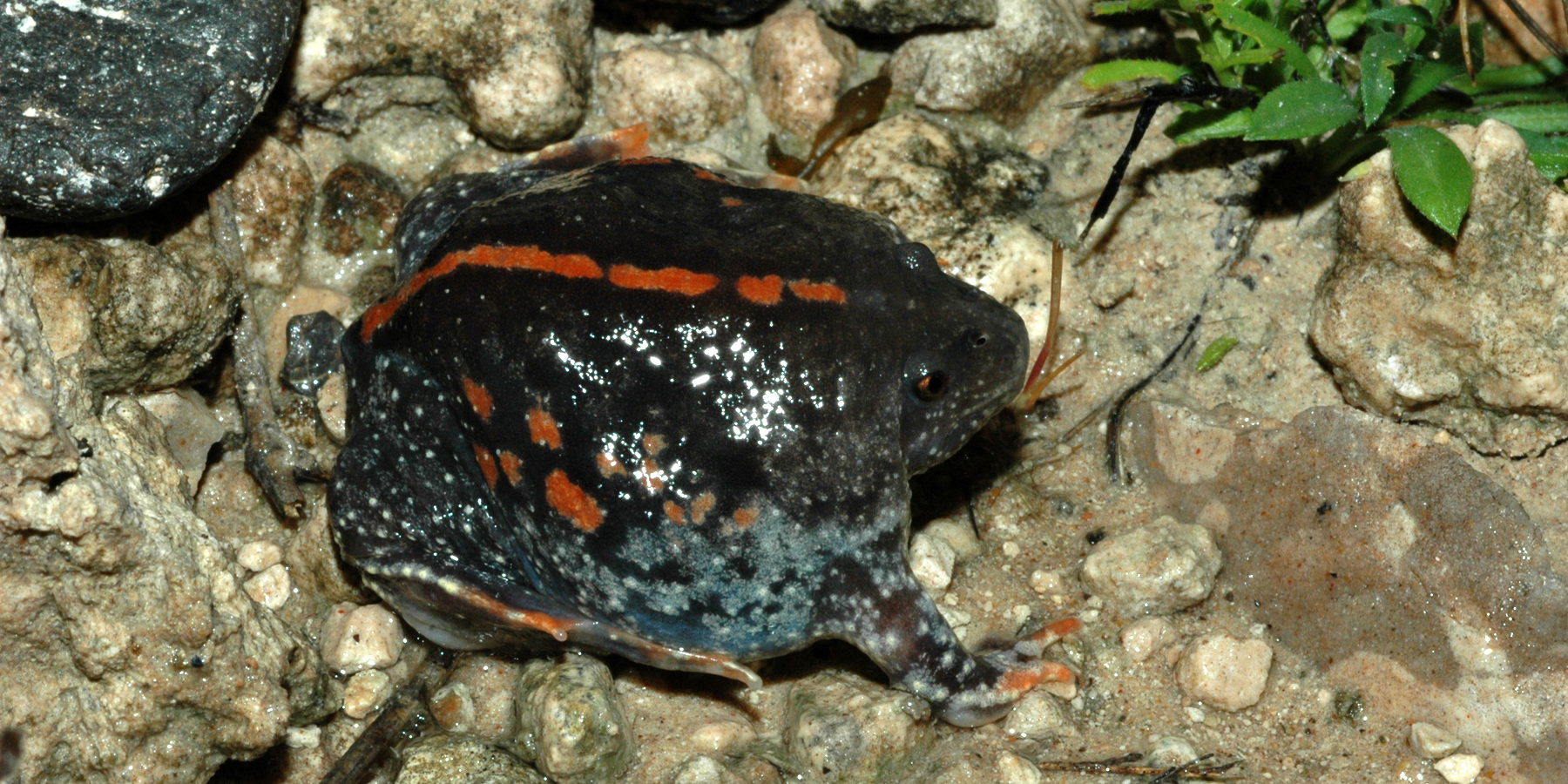
Burrowing Toad (Rhinophrynus dorsalis), Municipality of Reynosa, Tamaulipas, Mexico (8 October 2007).

Fishes: Two species, the San Ignacio pupfish (Cyprinodon bobmilleri) from the upper Rio San Fernando basin near Linares and the swordtail platyfish (Xiphophourus xiphidium) occurring in the upper parts of the Rio Soto La Maria, in Tamaulipas are endemic to this region. The Amazon molly (Poecilia formosa), is a unisexual (all female) species that reproduces through gynogenesis, a form of a form of parthenogenesis. Other fishes found in the area are alligator gar (Atractosteus spatula), longnose gar (Lepisosteus osseus), Rio Grande cichlid (Herichthys cyanoguttatus), sailfin molly (Poecilia latipinna), Rio Grande silvery minnow (Hybognathus amarus), San Juan minnow (Dionda couchi), Tamaulipas shiner (Notropis braytoni), Rio Grande shinner (Notropis jemezanus), Gulf killifish (Fundulus grandis), and Rio Grande darter (Etheostoma grahami). Two endemic species from this region, the phantom shinner (Notropis orca) and the Salado shinner (Notropis saladonis), are believed to be extinct.

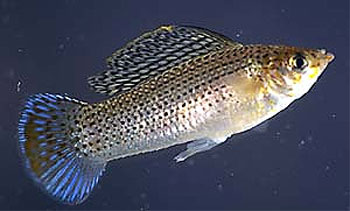
Sailfin molly (Poecilia latipinna)

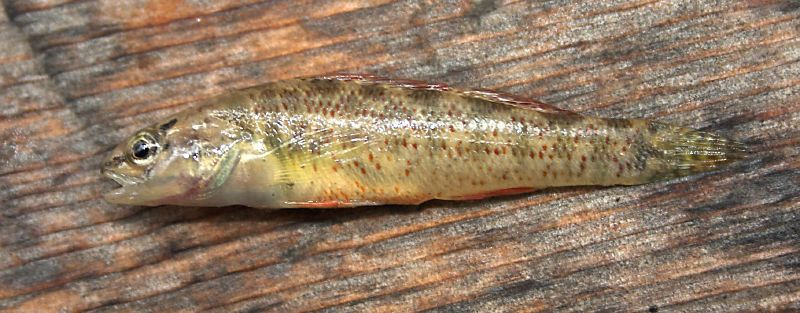
Rio Grande darter (Etheostoma grahami), Val Verde Co., Texas (22 June 2006).

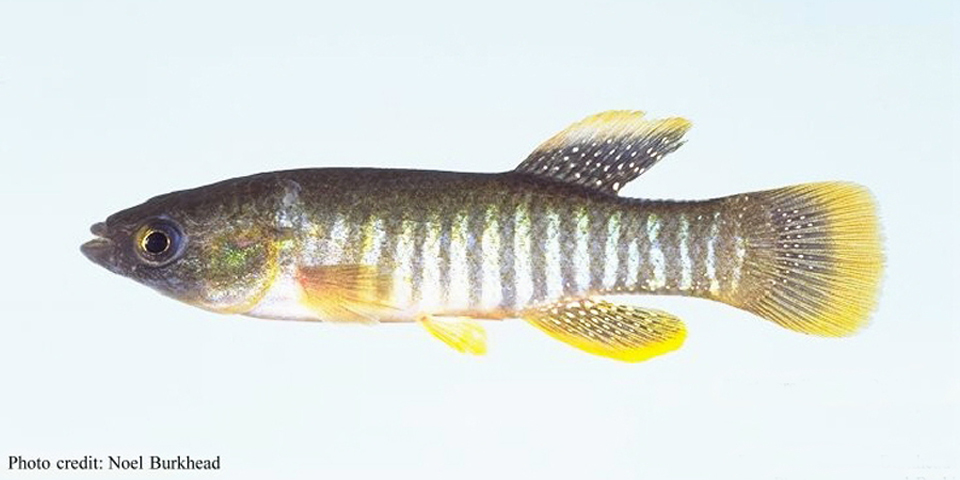
Gulf killifish (Fundulus grandis), male, Dixie Co., Florida.

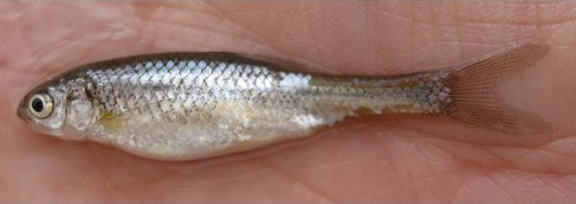
Rio Grande silvery minnow (Hybognathus amarus)

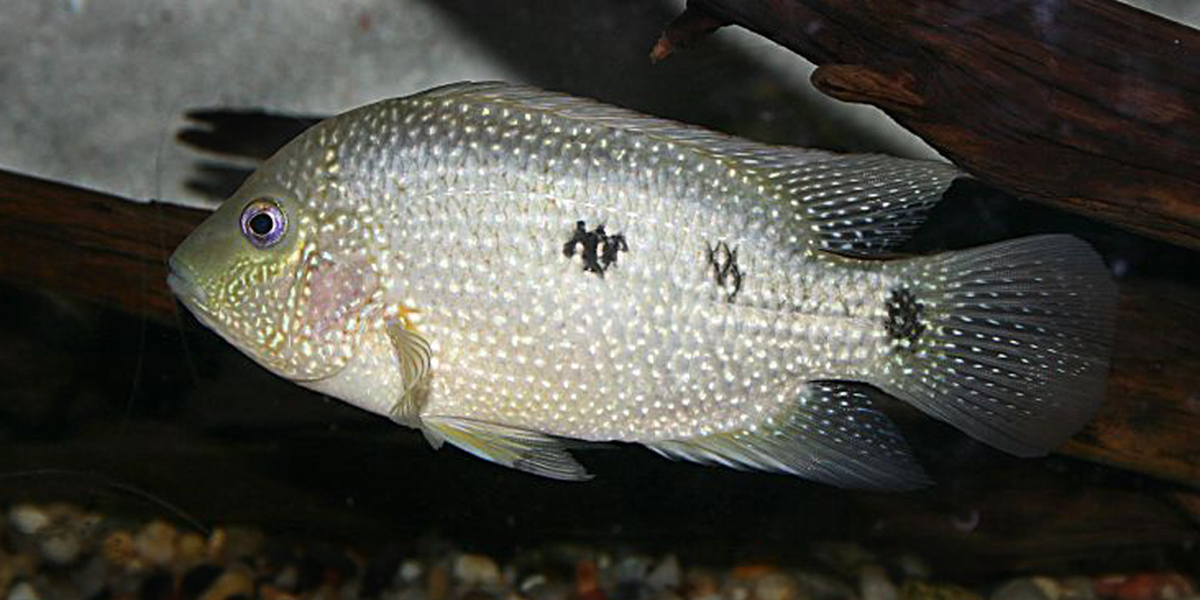
Rio Grande cichlid (Herichthys cyanoguttatus), Texas

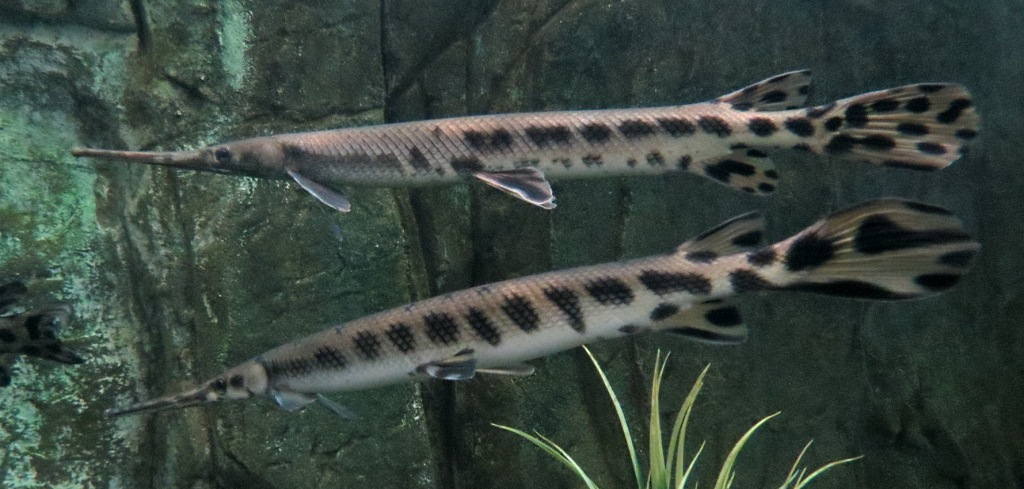
Longnose gar (Lepisosteus osseus)

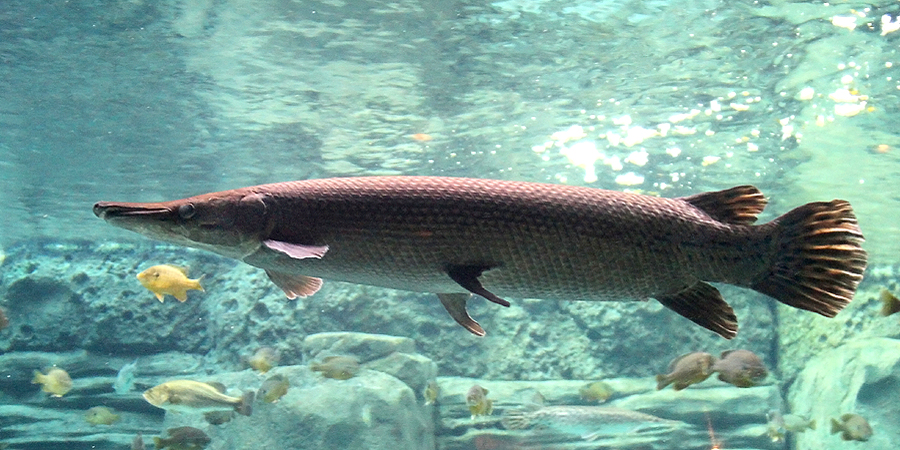
Alligator gar (Atractosteus spatula)

== Protected areas ==
Nature preserves are numerous in the region, however many are relatively small tracts of land concentrated on the north side of the Lower Rio Grande Valley. The state of Texas administers the following lands in the Lower Rio Grande Valley: Lake Casa Blanca International State Park (525 acres); Falcon State Park (576 acres); Bentsen-Rio Grande Valley State Park (764 acres); Estero Llano Grande State Park (230 acres); Resaca de la Palma State Park (1,200 acres); and the Las Palomas Wildlife Management Area comprised 18 units with tracts ranging from two to 604 acres (3,311 acres total). The U.S. Federal Government also administers lands in the Lower Rio Grande Valley including the Santa Ana National Wildlife Refuge (2,088 acres) and western and higher elevation areas of the Laguna Atascosa National Wildlife Refuge on the Gulf Coast (>97,000 acres). The multi-unit Lower Rio Grande Valley National Wildlife Refuge has nearly 40,000 acres open to the public [e.g. the Boca Chica tract (10,680 acres), East Lake unit (1,700 acres), La Puerta unit (4,000 acres), Teniente Lake unit (5,600 acres), Yturria Brush unit (1,800 acres)] and an additional 6,000 acres open to hunting [as of 2020]. Also of note is the Sabal Palm Sanctuary (557 acres), cooperatively managed by the Gorgas Science Foundation and the National Audubon Society, preserving some of the finest old growth riparian zones and sabal palm groves (Sabal mexicana) remaining.

Beyond the Lower Rio Grande Valley of Texas protected lands include the Chaparral Wildlife Management Area (15,200 acres), Lake Corpus Christi State Park (356 acres), and Choke Canyon State Park: including the Calliham unit (1,100 acres), the South Shore unit (385 acres), and the adjoining James E. Daughtrey Wildlife Management Area (34,000 acres).

In Tamaulipas, Mexico protected areas include western portions of the Laguna Madre y Delta del Rio Bravo and Parras de la Fuente, Reserva de la Paloma de Ala Blanca (ca. 23.8888°N, 98.5000°W), and in Coahuila, Mexico the Parque Nacional Los Novillos. Many of the protected lands in Mexico are actually "paper parks" owned and administer by local ejidos and municipalities, with few resources devoted to their management, no accommodations, no facilities or trails for visitors, and little management or enforcement of wildlife regulations. Nonetheless, such parks do limit land usage and development, and thus provide a significant degree of protection for habitat and the flora and fauna within.

== See also ==
- Mesquite Bosque
- Bosque
- List of ecoregions in Mexico
- List of ecoregions in the United States (WWF)
