= Coryphantha salinensis =

- Coryphantha salinensis with overlapping clusters of spines and white-woolly top

Conservation status
- Least Concern (IUCN 3.1)

Scientific classification
- Kingdom: Plantae
- Clade: Tracheophytes
- Clade: Angiosperms
- Clade: Eudicots
- Order: Caryophyllales
- Family: Cactaceae
- Subfamily: Cactoideae
- Genus: Coryphantha
- Species: C. salinensis

Binomial name
- Coryphantha salinensis (Poselg.) Dicht & A.Lüthy

Synonyms
- Coryphantha poselgeriana var. salinensis (Poselg.) L.Bremer; Echinocactus salinensis Poselg.; Coryphantha borwigii (J.A.Purpus) A.Berger; Mammillaria borwigii J.A.Purpus

Species of cactus

Spine clusters atop tubercles

In habitat, in crack of exposed limestone

Coryphantha salinensis is a species of cactus native only to northern Mexico. It belongs to the family Cactaceae.

== Description ==
Coryphantha salinensis is similar to several other ball-shaped, globular, or "pincushion" cactus species densely covered with spines. Here are key features distinguishing this species:

- Various features of the species, such as spine color and number, length of the central spines, and whether the plant grows in clumps depend on how old the plant is; the general appearance changes drastically depending on the stage of development.
- When young, the body is ball-shaped but with age becomes egg-shaped to somewhat cylindrical. It is up to 15 cm (6 in) in diameter, grayish-green, with the surfaced divided into prominent spiraling tubercles with rounded to narrowing tops. Young plants usually do not form clumps.
- Atop each tubercle is an areole covered with fine, white wool. Arising within the areole are 10-20 "radial spines" radiating from a common point, growing more or less horizontally above the cactus body; these are up to 18 mm (11/16 in) long, stiff, slender and gray. Except in young individuals, from the center of the common point of attachment of the radial spines rises one to four much thicker "central spines" which are straight to strongly curved, black or blackish, and may be about 21 mm (13/16 in) long, but con become much longer on older plants.
- Funnel-shaped flowers are pale yellow with a reddish "eye", and up to 7 cm (2 3/4 in) tall and a little wider than that.
- Fruits are ball-shaped, olive green, and about 10 mm (3/8 in) in diameter. Seeds are light brown and about 3 mm (1/8 in) long and 1 mm (1/32 in) thick.

Coryphantha salinensis appears to intergrade with Coryphantha diffidlis, and is sympatric with it.

== Distribution ==
Coryphantha salinensis is endemic just to Mexico's northern states of Chihuahua, Coahuila, Nuevo León and Tamaulipas.

== Habitat ==
Coryphantha salinensis inhabits desert scrub. At the foot of the eastern slopes of the Eastern Sierra Madre it grows in alluvial plains and limestone gravel. Images on this page show an individual issuing from a crack in bare limestone at about 2,100 m (6,900 ft) in elevation, where grassy scrub was transitioning into a forest higher up.

== In cultivation ==
It is unusual to find Coryphantha salinensis in cultivation. However, sometimes it is, and the species can be grown from seed. The seeds can be removed from significantly overripe fruits, cleaned, dried, and stored for later planting. Because of its limited distribution area, habitat destruction and overcollection, some cactus collectors emphasize that cultivation using seeds or plants from responsible sources helps preserve wild specimens; people are less likely to collect them in the wild.

== Taxonomy ==
In 1853, Coryphantha salinensis was first formally described and named by Heinrich Poselger, using the basionym of Echinocactus salinensis. In his description, he noted that his type specimen was from the plains between Salinas and Monterrey.

=== Phylogeny ===
Molecular phylogenetic analysis using 5 chloroplast regions in 44 species of Coryphantha found Coryphantha salinensis to be sister to Coryphantha sulcata. This pair of taxa formed a clade sister to a clade comprising Coryphantha echinus and Coryphantha kracikii.

=== Etymology ===
The genus name Coryphantha is from the Greek coryph, meaning "head, helmet/crown", and the Greek anthos, meaning "flower." This refers to the taxon's flowers growing at the body's top.

The species name salinensis derives from its occurrence near the town of Salinas Victoria in the state of Nuevo León.
