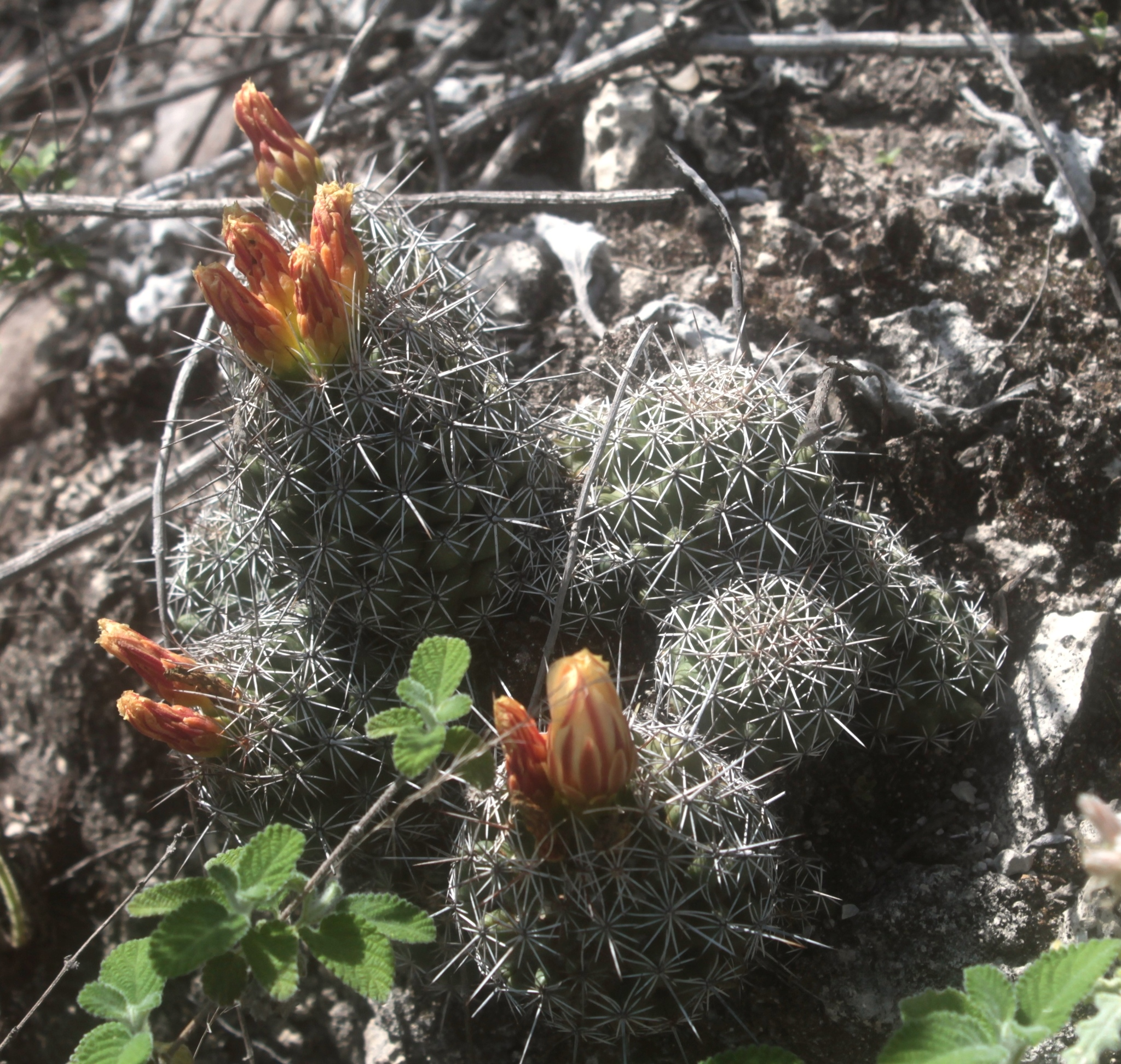

Conservation status
- Least Concern (IUCN 3.1)

Scientific classification
- Kingdom: Plantae
- Clade: Tracheophytes
- Clade: Angiosperms
- Clade: Eudicots
- Order: Caryophyllales
- Family: Cactaceae
- Subfamily: Cactoideae
- Genus: Coryphantha
- Species: C. jalpanensis

Binomial name
- Coryphantha jalpanensis Franc.G.Buchenau

= Coryphantha jalpanensis =

Cactus found only in Mexico

Coryphantha jalpanensis is a succulent plant belonging to the Cactaceae family. It is endemic to Mexico.

== Description ==
Stems of Coryphantha jalpanensis branch from the plant base. Stems are cylindrical and grow to about 15 cm tall (6 inches) and to about 6 cm wide (3½ inches). They are erect, pale to dark green, and part of it grows underground. The body surface is deeply divided into numerous tubercles looking like closely packed bottoms of green chili peppers. Atop each tubercle arises a cluster of needlelike spines from a spot known as the areole. Spines grow straight, not hooked.

In the center of each spine cluster arise 3 or 4 dark brown to gray "central spines" up to 1 cm tall (0.4 inch). Surrounding the central spines are 10 to 13 "radial spines," each about 1 cm long. They grow horizontally, more or less even with the stem's surface, and are grayish. The light yellow flowers are up to about 4.5 cm long and wide (1¾ x 1¾ inch). The flowers' external tepals are yellow with green margins, while internal ones are just yellow. The flowers' stamens consist of yellow, pollen-producing anthers atop filaments which are yellow at their tops but purple at their bases. The female pistil's style is yellowish green, topped with a pale yellow stigma. The egg-shaped fruit is up to 2 cm long (~¾ inch long) and 1 cm wide (0.4 inch) Seeds are pale brown.

Compared to other Coryphatha species, among the distinctions of Coryphantha jalpanensis are that its body is branched, plus in the depressions between its tubercles it bears "extrafloral nectaries"—nectaries not located in the flowers.

== Phenology ==
Within its native distribution area Coryphantha jalpanensis flowers from April to June.

== Habitat ==
Coryphantha jalpanensis inhabits rocky limestone slopes, both forested and grassy ones. In the cactus's limited distribution area it occurs at altitudes between 600 and 1300 meters.

== Distribution ==
Endemic just to the southern part of Mexico's Eastern Sierra Madre mountains, the Sierra Madre Oriental, the iNaturalist website documents research-grade observations of Coryphantha jalpanensis in the Mexican states of San Luis Potosí, Querétaro, Guanajuato and Hidalgo.

== Conservation status ==
The IUCN Red List lists Coryphantha jalpanensis as a taxon of Least Concern. However, that assessment was made on November 16, 2009. A more recent assessment made by those who studied the species closely in 2019 write that in the area where they know the plant agriculture and ranching may put the plant at risk.

== Taxonomy ==
Coryphantha jalpanensis was described for the first time by Francisco Guillermo Buchenau in 1965.

A study considering 28 features of both sexual and nonsexual nature, of which 17 were quantitative and 11 qualitative, produced a cladogram in which Coryphantha jalpanensis formed a clade with C. erecta and C. glassii. The same study found no quantitative differences between C. jalpanensis and C. glassii, and it was suggested that C. glassii should be treated as a subspecies of C. jalpanensis.

== Etymology ==
The genus name Coryphantha is derived from the Greek koryphē, mean "summit," and the Greek anthos, meaning "flower"; the resulting term describes the feature of Coryphantha flowers appearing near the top of the plant.

The species name jalpanensis honors the town of Jalpan de Serra in northern Querétaro, in the heart of the distribution area of Coryphantha jalapensis. Usually the town is just called Jalpan, with the J pronounced as if it were an H, and with the first syllable emphasized.

== Uses ==
Searches on the Internet for uses of Coryphantha jalapensis finds very little mentioned, not even for sale. In fact, at the Greenhouse Forum there's a topic entitled "Cacti and succulents never offered for sale," of which Coryphantha jalpanensis stands in fourth place.
