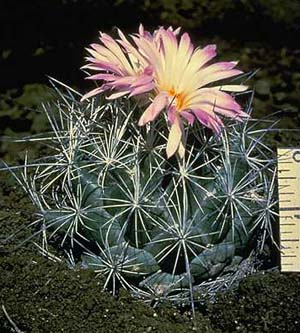
- Coryphantha ramillosa

Scientific classification
- Kingdom: Plantae
- Clade: Tracheophytes
- Clade: Angiosperms
- Clade: Eudicots
- Order: Caryophyllales
- Family: Cactaceae
- Subfamily: Cactoideae
- Tribe: Cacteae
- Genus: Coryphantha (Engelm.) Lem.

Species
- See text

= Coryphantha =

Genus of cacti

Coryphantha (from Greek, "flowering on the top"), or beehive cactus, is a genus of small to middle-sized, globose or columnar cacti. The genus is native to arid parts of Central America, Mexico, through Arizona, New Mexico, and western Texas and north into southwestern, central, and southeastern Montana. With its two subgenera, 57 species and 20 subspecies, it is one of the largest genera of cacti.

== Description ==
There are four characteristics that distinguish Coryphantha from other cacti.

1. Their bodies do not have ribs, only tubercles.
2. The flowers form at the top of the plant (the apex or growing end of the stem).
3. The tip (podarium) of each flowering tubercle has three parts, the spiny areole, the groove and the axil. Without the groove it is not a Coryphantha.
4. The seed coat (or testa) has a net-like pattern (reticulate).

More than many other cacti, the Coryphantha change in their appearance over their lifespan. The presence or absence of a central spine is not indicative of the genus, even in fully adult plants.

=== Name ===
The name Coryphantha was first applied by George Engelmann in 1856 as a subgenus, with Lemaire's earlier name Aulacothele having been abandoned. In 1868, Lemaire promoted the group to genus level. Before this, all Coryphantha had been classified as Mammillaria.

== Species ==
Image	Scientific name	Subspecies	Distribution
	Coryphantha clavata (Scheidw.) Backeb.	Coryphantha clavata subsp. clavata; Coryphantha clavata subsp. stipitata (Scheidw.) Dicht & A.Lüthy	Mexico
	Coryphantha compacta (Engelm.) Orcutt		Mexico (to Sonora)
	Coryphantha cornifera (DC.) Lem.		Mexico
	Coryphantha delaetiana (Quehl) A.Berger		Mexico.
	Coryphantha delicata L.Bremer		Mexico.
	Coryphantha difficilis (Quehl) Orcutt		Mexico (Coahuila, Nuevo León, San Luis Potosí)
	Coryphantha durangensis (Runge ex K.Schum.) Britton & Rose	Coryphantha durangensis subsp. cuencamensis (L.Bremer) Dicht & A.Lüthy; Coryphantha durangensis subsp. durangensis	Mexico (Durango, Coahuila).
	Coryphantha echinoidea (Quehl) Britton & Rose		Mexico
	Coryphantha echinus (Engelm.) Britton & Rose		Central Texas to NE. Mexico
	Coryphantha elephantidens (Lem.) Lem.	Coryphantha elephantidens subsp. bumamma (Ehrenb.) Dicht & A.Lüthy; Coryphantha elephantidens subsp. elephantidens; Coryphantha elephantidens subsp. greenwoodii (Bravo) Dicht & A.Lüthy	Mexico.
	Coryphantha erecta (Lem. ex Pfeiff.) Lem.		Mexico (to Veracruz)
	Coryphantha georgii Boed.		Mexico.
	Coryphantha glanduligera (Otto & A.Dietr.) Lem.		Mexico (to Jalisco).
	Coryphantha glassii Dicht & A.Lüthy		Mexico (Guanajuato, San Luis Potosí).
	Coryphantha gracilis Bremer & A.B.Lau		Mexico (Chihuahua).
	Coryphantha hintoniorum Dicht & A.Lüthy	Coryphantha hintoniorum subsp. geoffreyi Dicht & A.Lüthy; Coryphantha hintoniorum subsp. hintoniorum	Mexico (Coahuila, Nuevo León, San Luis Potosí)
	Coryphantha ibarrana Matusz. & Šnicer		Mexico (Durango)
	Coryphantha jalpanensis Buchenau		Mexico (Querétaro to Hidalgo)
	Coryphantha kracikii Halda, Chalupa & Kupčák		Mexico (Durango)
	Coryphantha longicornis Boed.		Mexico (Coahuila, Chihuahua, Durango)
	Coryphantha maiz-tablasensis Fritz Schwarz ex Backeb.		Mexico (to Jalisco)
	Coryphantha neglecta L.Bremer		Mexico (Coahuila, Nuevo León).
	Coryphantha nickelsiae (K.Brandegee) Britton & Rose		Texas to Mexico (Coahuila, Tamaulipas, Nuevo León)
	Coryphantha octacantha (DC.) Britton & Rose		Mexico (to Jalisco).
	Coryphantha ottonis (Pfeiff.) Lem.		Mexico.
	Coryphantha pallida Britton & Rose	Coryphantha pallida subsp. calipensis (Bravo ex S.Arias, Gama & U.Guzmán) Dicht & A.Lüthy; Coryphantha pallida subsp. pallida; Coryphantha pallida subsp. pseudoradians (Bravo) U.Guzmán & Vázq.-Ben.	Mexico (Veracruz, Puebla, Oaxaca)
	Coryphantha poselgeriana (A.Dietr.) Britton & Rose		Mexico.
	Coryphantha potosiana (Jacobi) Glass & R.A.Foster		Mexico (Nuevo León, San Luis Potosí, Zacatecas)
	Coryphantha pseudoechinus Boed.	Coryphantha pseudoechinus subsp. laui (L.Bremer) Dicht & A.Lüthy; Coryphantha pseudoechinus subsp. pseudoechinus	Mexico.
	Coryphantha pseudonickelsiae Backeb.		Mexico (Durango, Chihuahua, Coahuila)
	Coryphantha pulleineana (Backeb.) Glass		Mexico (Tamaulipas, San Luis Potosí)
	Coryphantha pycnacantha (Mart.) Lem.		Mexico.
	Coryphantha ramillosa Cutak	Coryphantha ramillosa subsp. ramillosa; Coryphantha ramillosa subsp. santarosa Dicht & A.Lüthy	SW. Texas to NE. Mexico
	Coryphantha recurvata (Engelm.) Britton & Rose	Coryphantha recurvata subsp. canatlanensis Dicht & A.Lüthy; Coryphantha recurvata subsp. recurvata	Arizona to Mexico (Sonora)
	Coryphantha retusa (Pfeiff.) Britton & Rose		Mexico (Puebla, Oaxaca)
	Coryphantha robustispina (Schott ex Engelm.) Britton & Rose	Coryphantha robustispina subsp. robustispina; Coryphantha robustispina subsp. scheeri (Lem.) N.P.Taylor	Arizona to SW. New Mexico and Mexico (Sonora)
	Coryphantha salinensis (Poselg.) Dicht & A.Lüthy		. Mexico
	Coryphantha sulcata (Engelm.) Britton & Rose		Texas to Mexico (Coahuila, Tamualipas, Nuevo León)
	Coryphantha tripugionacantha A.B.Lau		Mexico (Zacatecas, Jalisco)
	Coryphantha vaupeliana Boed.		Mexico (Tamaulipas, Durango, Zacatecas)
	Coryphantha vogtherriana Werderm. & Boed.		Mexico (Jalisco to San Luis Potosí)
	Coryphantha werdermannii Boed.		Mexico (Coahuila, Chihuahua, Durango)
	Coryphantha wohlschlageri Holzeis		Mexico (Tamaulipas, San Luis Potosí)

== Synonymy ==
The genus' synonyms include:

- Escobrittonia Doweld
- Glandulifera (Salm-Dyck) Fric (nom. inval.)

== Related genera ==
A number of Coryphantha species have previously been classified in other genera; indeed, the type species, C. sulcata, was originally named Mammillaria sulcata. Other examples include Echinocactus salinensis (now Coryphantha salinensis) and Neolloydia pulleineana (now Coryphantha pulleineana).

Similarly, a number of other species have been previously classified as Coryphantha. For example, Pelecyphora vivipara was formerly called Coryphantha vivipara, and Cumarinia odorata was formerly called Coryphantha odorata.

== Gallery ==
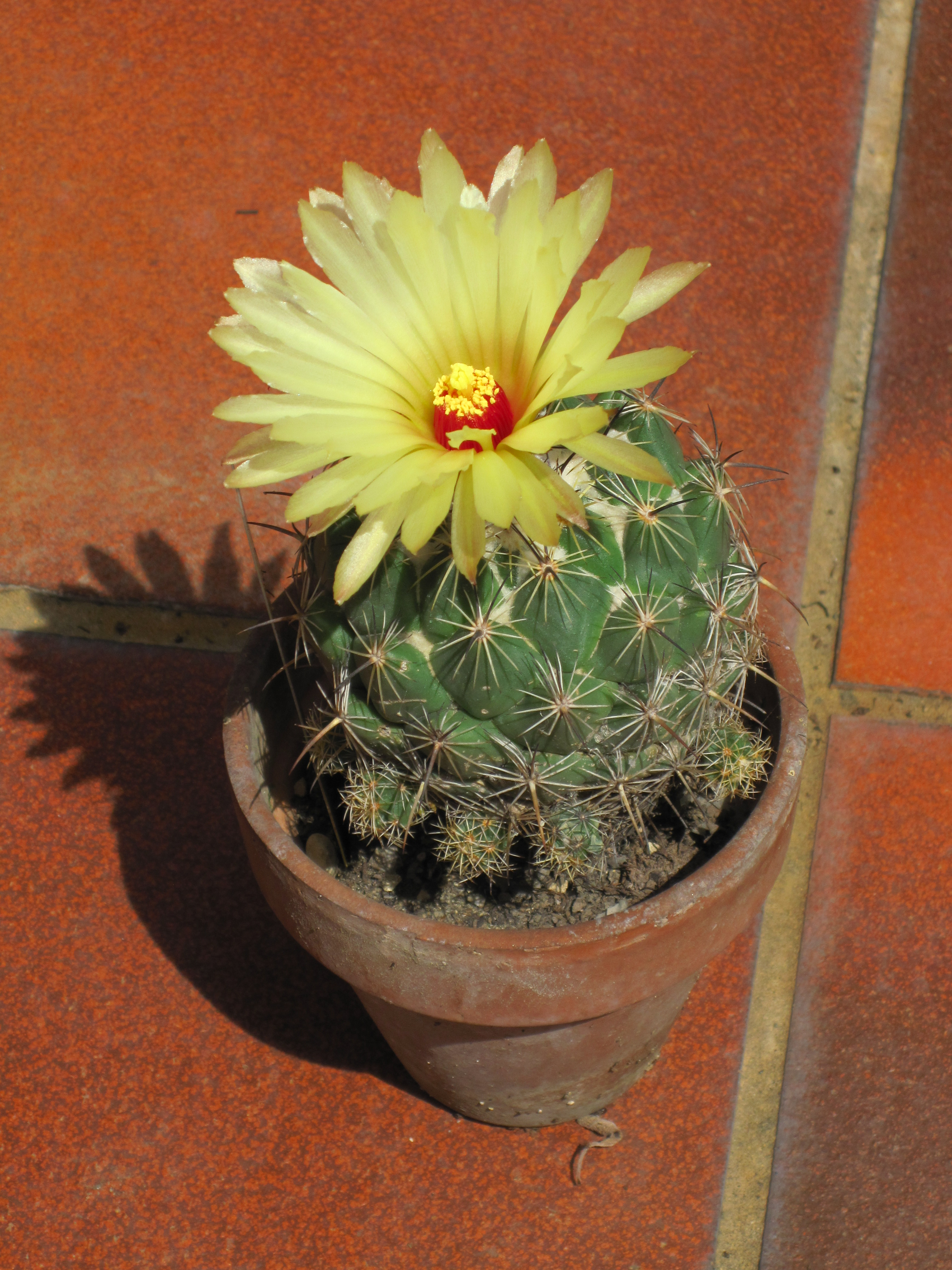
Coryphantha delicata

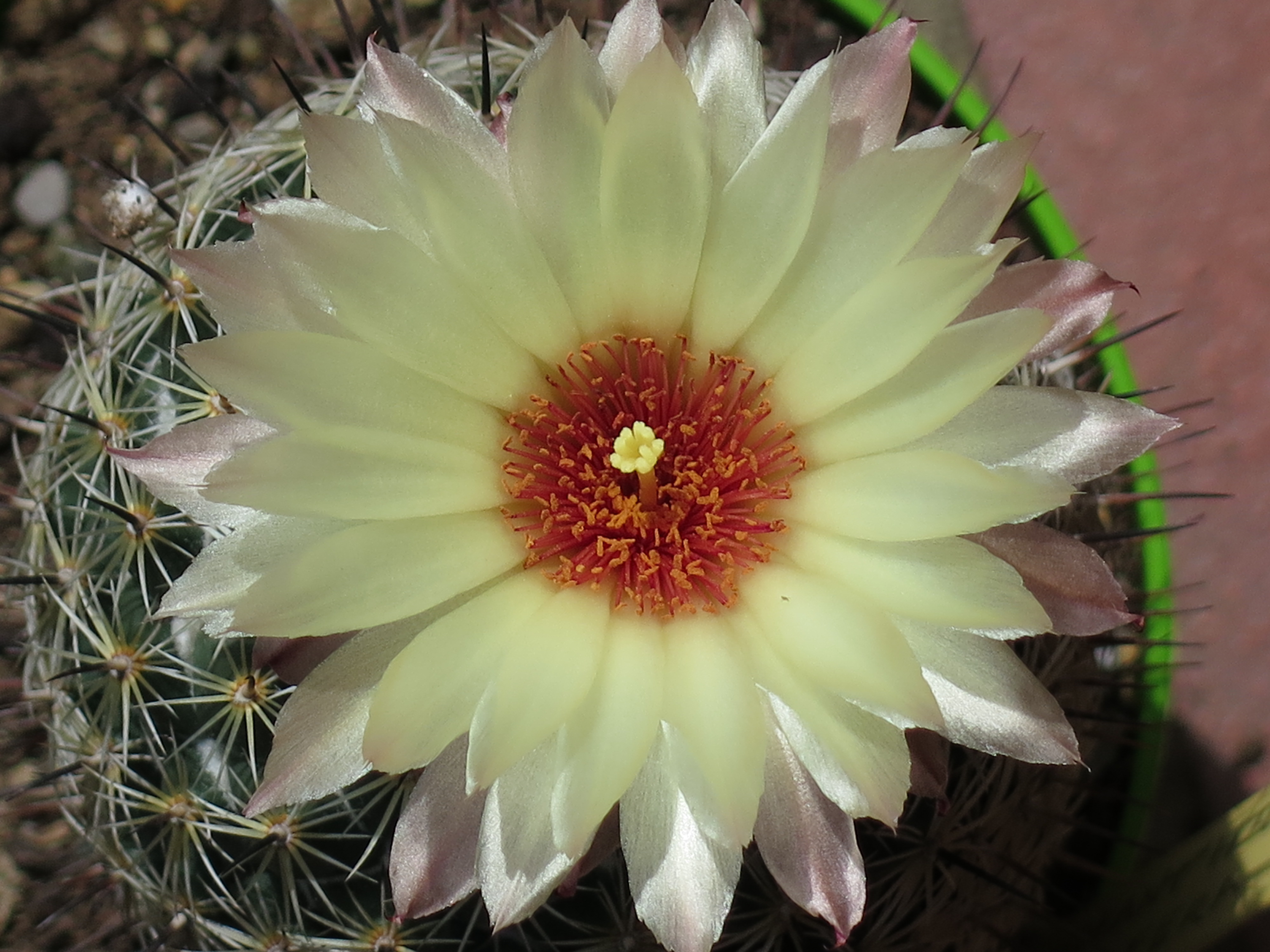
Coryphantha cornifera

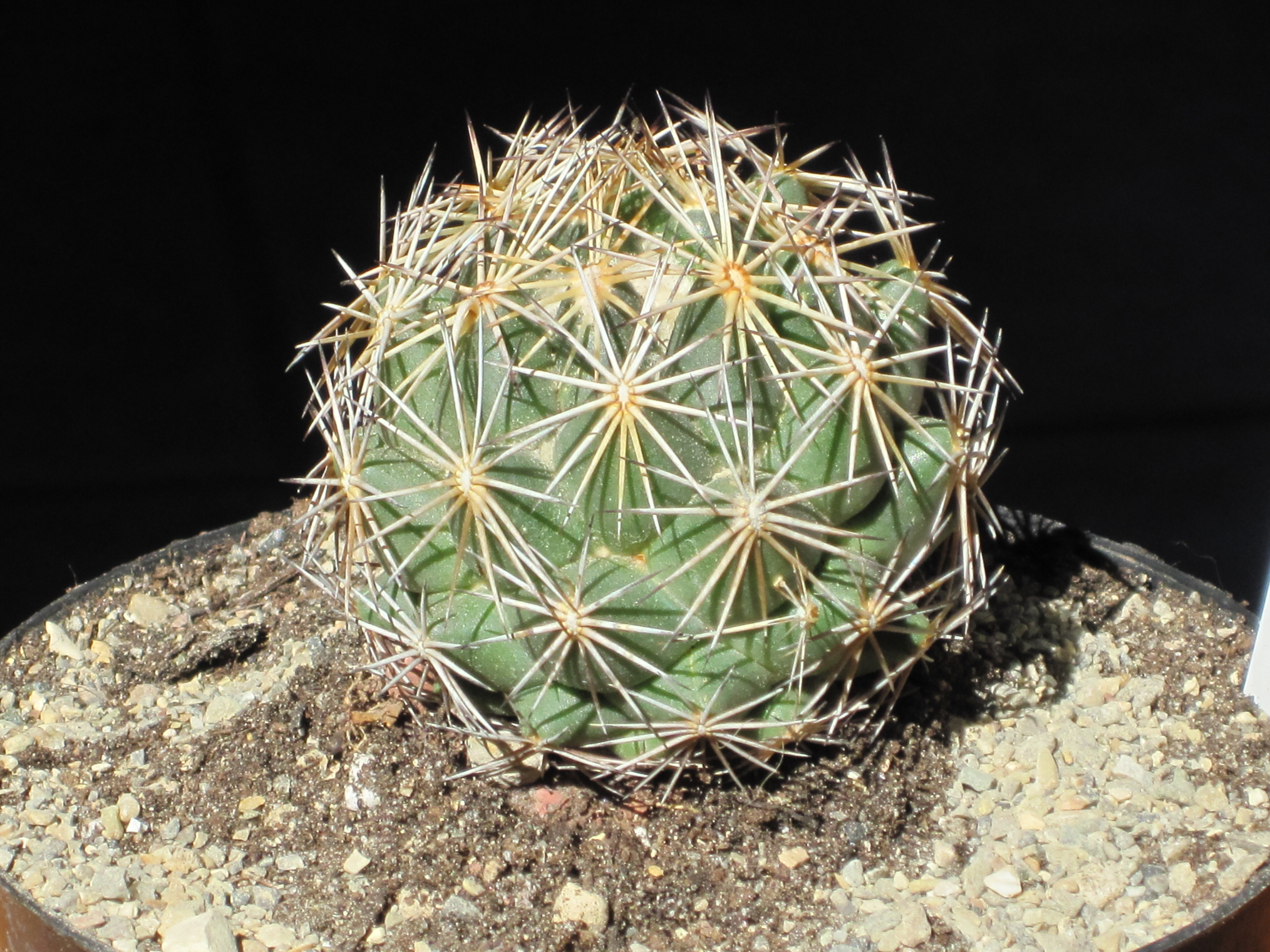
Coryphantha delicata

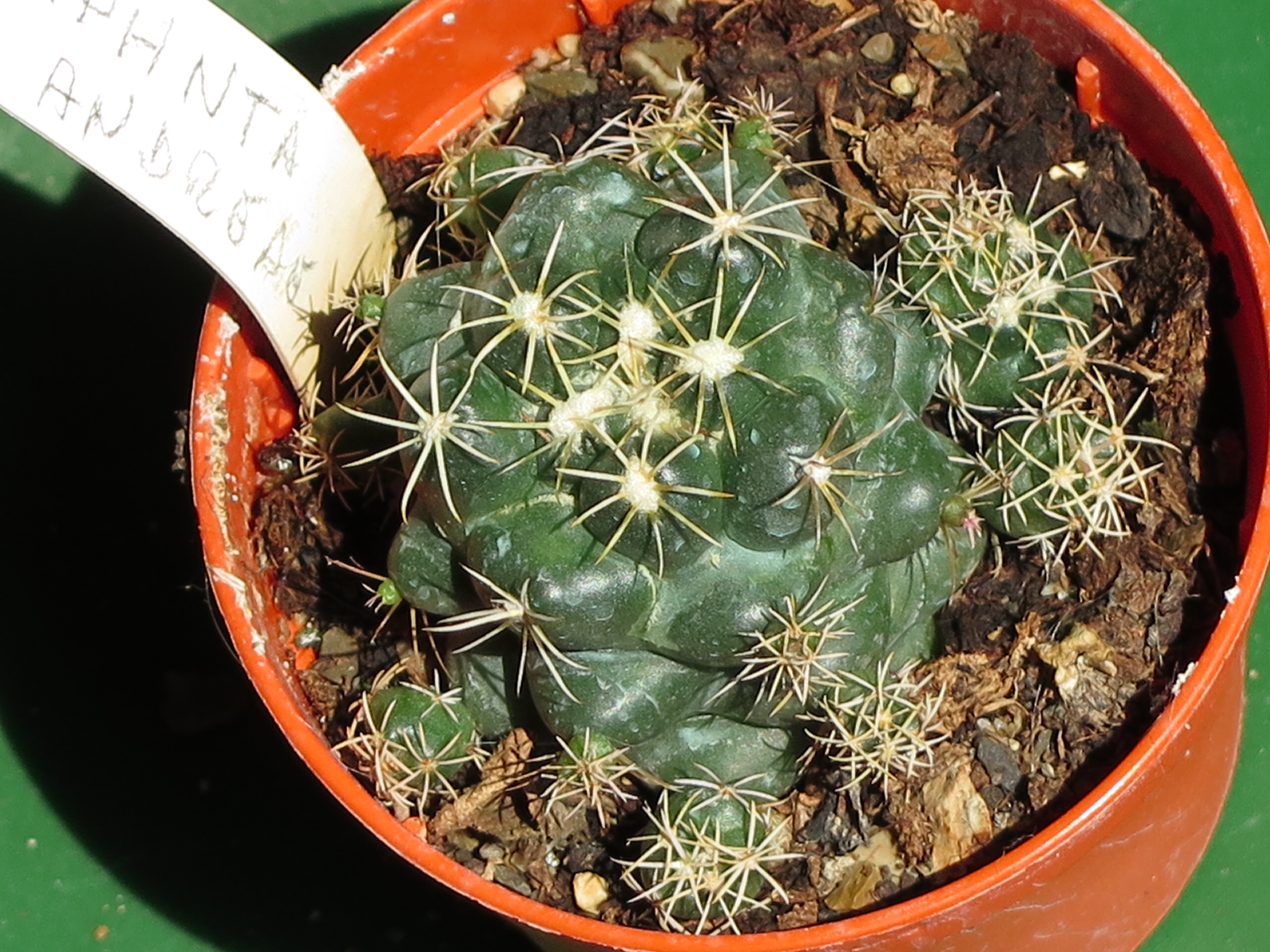
Coryphantha pycnacantha
