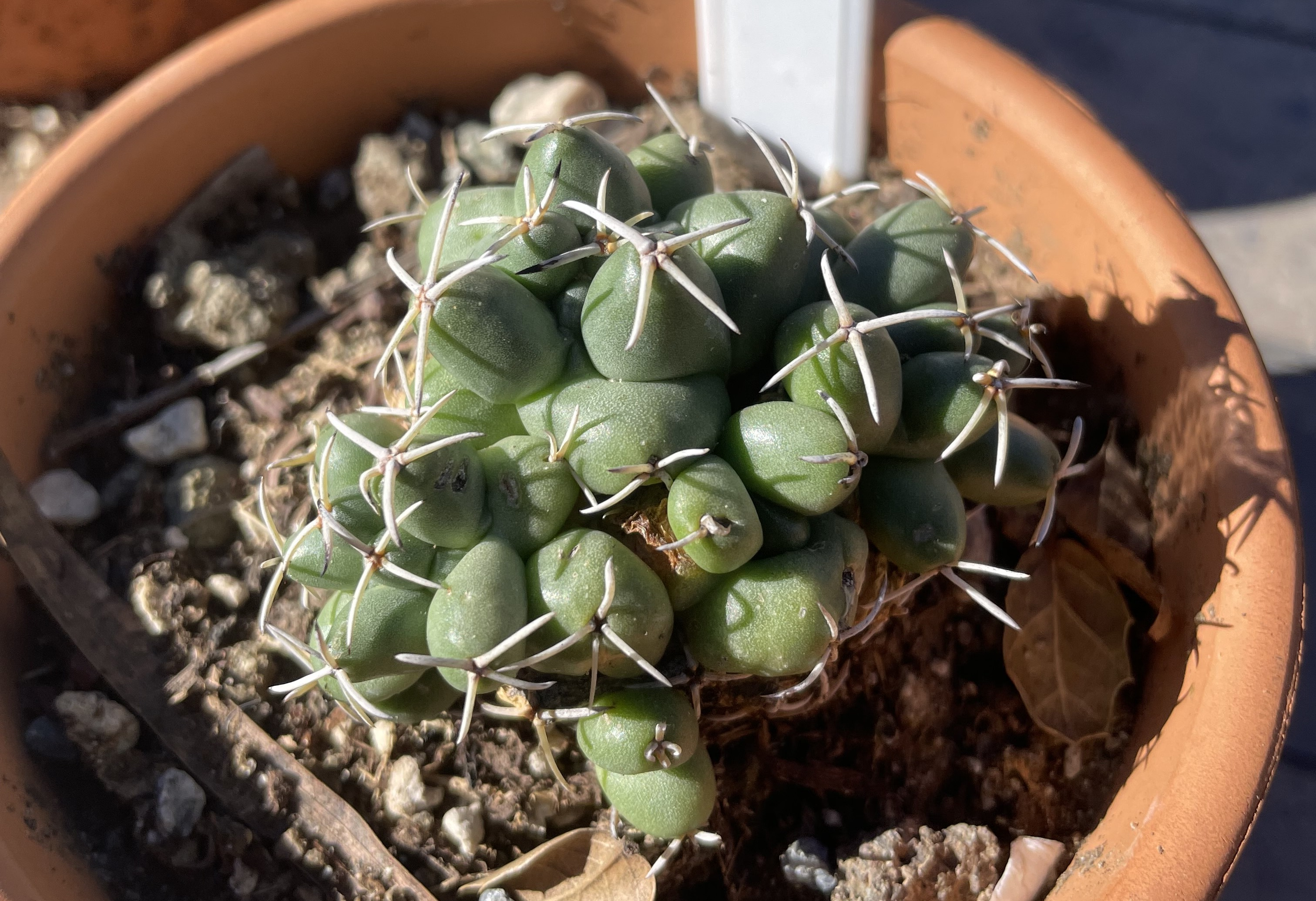

Conservation status
- Least Concern (IUCN 3.1)

Scientific classification
- Kingdom: Plantae
- Clade: Embryophytes
- Clade: Tracheophytes
- Clade: Spermatophytes
- Clade: Angiosperms
- Clade: Eudicots
- Order: Caryophyllales
- Family: Cactaceae
- Subfamily: Cactoideae
- Genus: Coryphantha
- Species: C. elephantidens

Binomial name
- Coryphantha elephantidens (Lem.) Lem.

= Coryphantha elephantidens =

Species of cactus

Coryphantha elephantidens is a species of cactus native to Mexico and was first described in 1838.

== Description ==
Coryphantha elephanidens is a usually depressed plant meaning it grows low to the ground. Sometimes, this plant can clump, or very rarely, have multiple growth points on a head. Spines sometimes tipped with black grow on tubercles in groups of 2-5

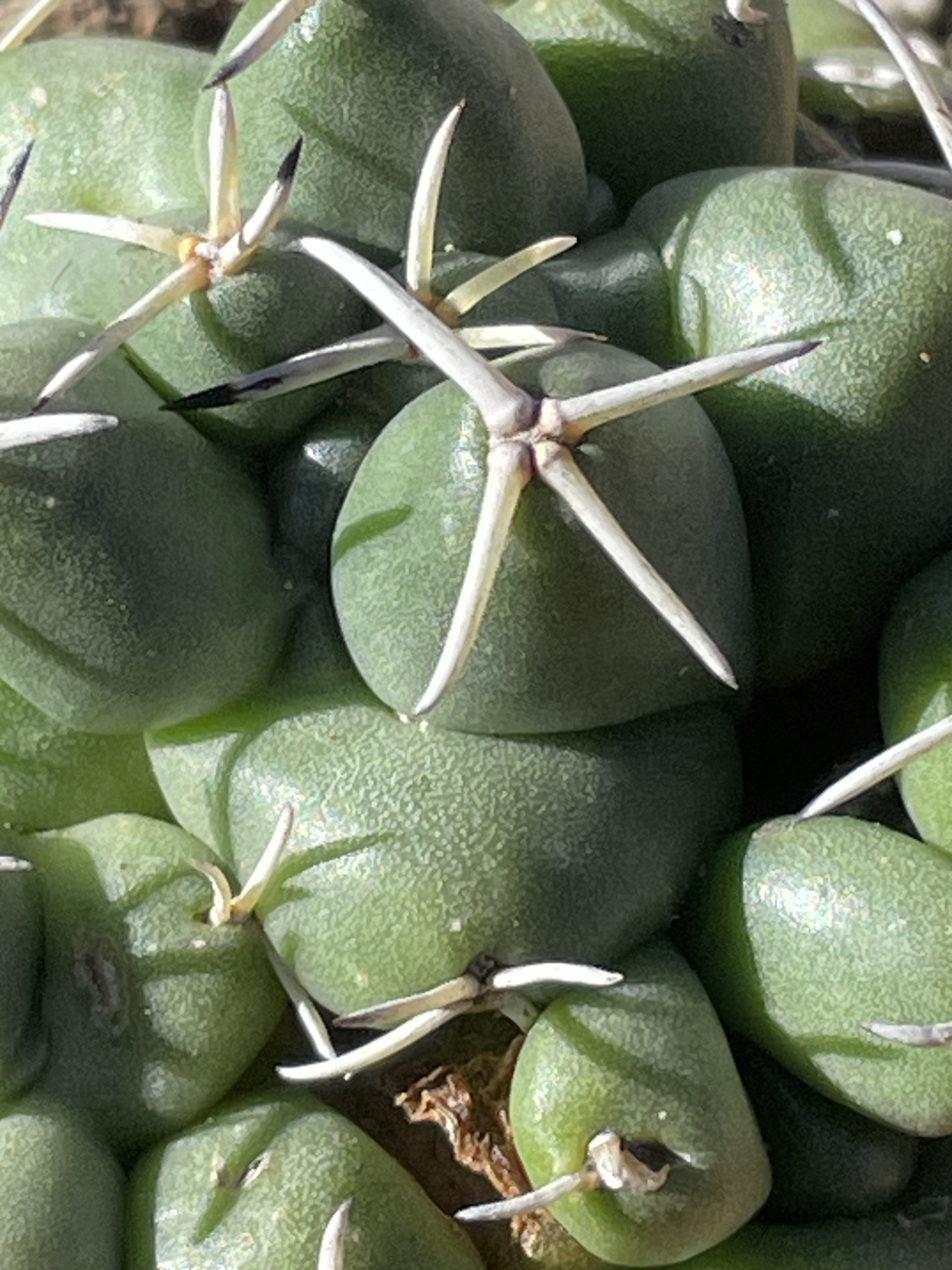
Coryphantha elephantidens close up

== Flowers ==
This species has a whitish to pink flower. The flower can also be yellow, and is self fertile.
