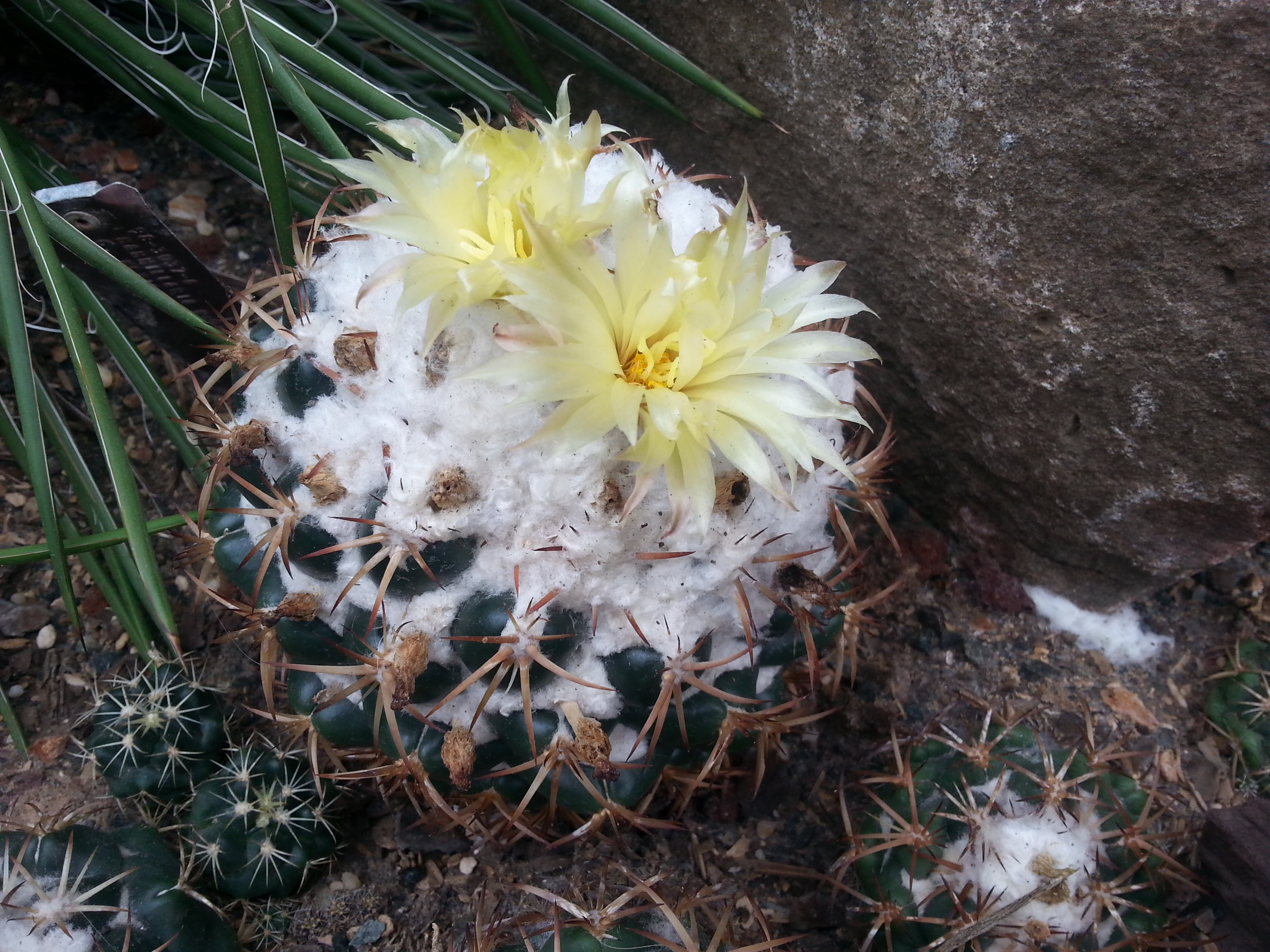

Conservation status
- Endangered (IUCN 3.1)

Scientific classification
- Kingdom: Plantae
- Clade: Tracheophytes
- Clade: Angiosperms
- Clade: Eudicots
- Order: Caryophyllales
- Family: Cactaceae
- Subfamily: Cactoideae
- Genus: Coryphantha
- Species: C. pycnacantha

Binomial name
- Coryphantha pycnacantha (Mart.) Lem.

Synonyms
- Synonymy: Cactus acanthostephes (Lehm.) Kuntze; Cactus latimamma (DC.) Kuntze; Cactus pycnacanthus (Mart.) Kuntze; Cactus scepontocentrus (Lem.) Kuntze; Cactus winkleri (Poselg.) Kuntze; Coryphantha acanthostephes (Lehm.) Lem.; Coryphantha andreae A.Berger; Coryphantha conimamma (Linke) A.Berger; Coryphantha connivens Britton & Rose; Coryphantha pycnacantha var. calipensis U.Guzmán; Coryphantha pycnacantha subsp. sniceri (Halda, Kupčák & Sladk.) Halda, Kupčák & Sladk.; Echinocactus acanthostephes (Lehm.) Poselg.; Echinocactus pycnacanthus (Mart.) Poselg.; Echinocactus radiatus Pfeiff.; Echinocactus winkleri Poselg.; Escobaria sniceri Halda, Kupčák & Sladk.; Mammillaria acanthostephes Lehm.; Mammillaria andreae J.A.Purpus & Boed., nom. illeg. homonym. post.; Mammillaria conimamma Linke; Mammillaria latimamma DC.; Mammillaria latimamma var. spinosior Monv. ex Salm-Dyck; Mammillaria pycnacantha Mart. (1829) (basionym); Mammillaria scepontocentra Lem.; Mammillaria winkleri (Poselg.) C.F.Först.

= Coryphantha pycnacantha =

Species of cactus

Coryphantha pycnacantha is a cactus species endemic to central Mexico.

It is native to the states of Hidalgo, Puebla, Tlaxcala, and Veracruz

It grows on deep lava soils, and is an IUCN Red List Endangered species.
