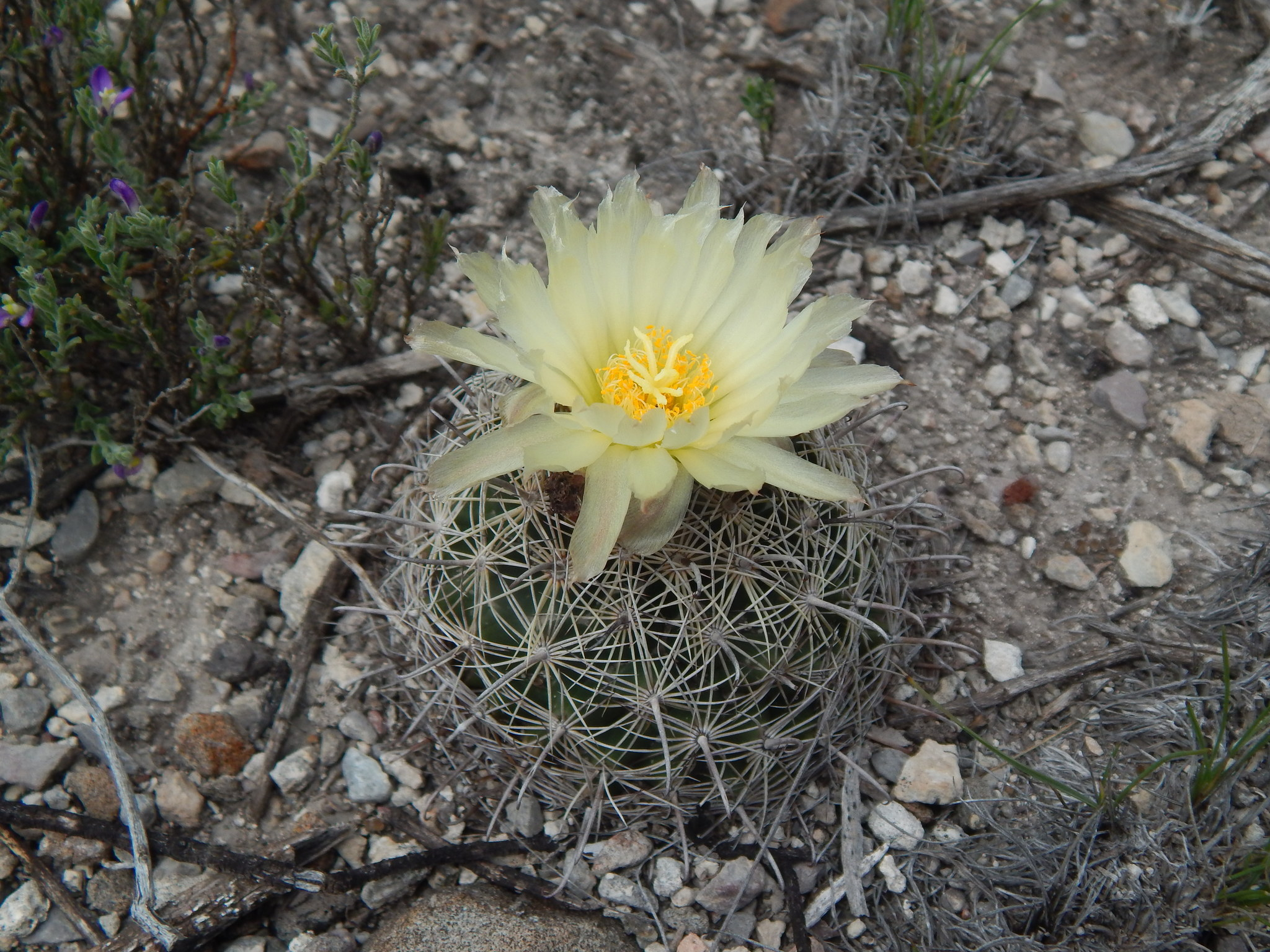

Conservation status
- Least Concern (IUCN 3.1)

Scientific classification
- Kingdom: Plantae
- Clade: Tracheophytes
- Clade: Angiosperms
- Clade: Eudicots
- Order: Caryophyllales
- Family: Cactaceae
- Subfamily: Cactoideae
- Genus: Coryphantha
- Species: C. delicata

Binomial name
- Coryphantha delicata L.Bremer
- Coryphantha delicata main distribution

Synonyms
- Coryphantha daimonoceras var. jaumavei Frič (1925); Coryphantha jaumavei L.Frič (1925); Coryphantha panarottoi Halda & Horáček (1999)

= Coryphantha delicata =

Species of cactus

Coryphantha delicata is a small cactus native to Mexico.

== Description ==
Coryphantha delicata is a small cactus species endemic just to northeastern Mexico. Although it can grow solitary, it may appear in populations consisting of hundreds of plants. The stems range from spherical to half-spherical, reaching heights of up to about 5 cm (2.0 in) and diameters of up to about 6 cm (2.4 in). The body is dark green and its top may be covered with white wool.

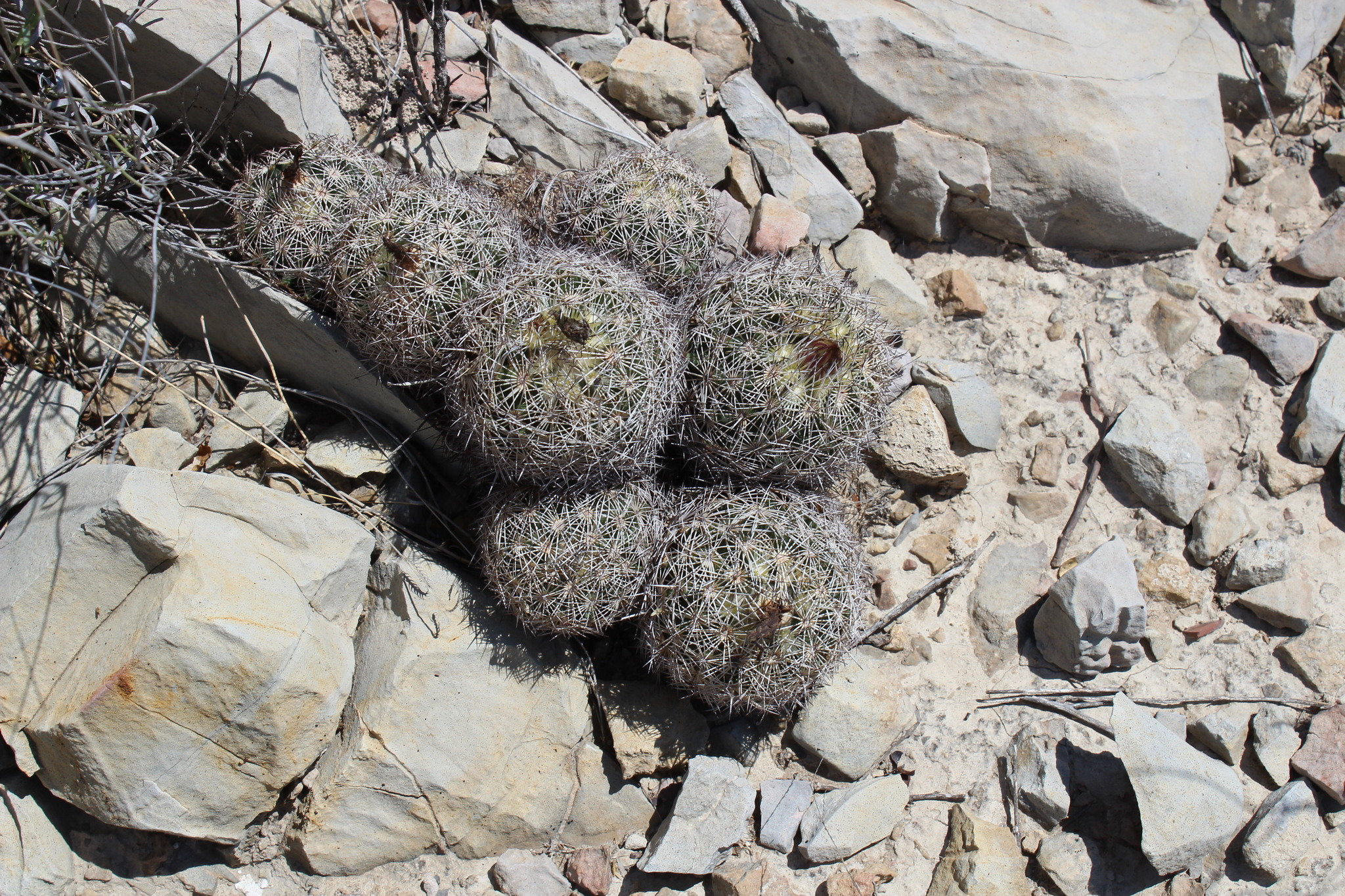
Plant growing in a group

Typical of species of the genus Coryphantha, the body surfaces are divided into conical tubercles with rounded tops, arranged in 8 to 13 spiraling rows; the tubercles look like closely packed, green chili pepper bottoms. Atop each tubercle arises a cluster of slender, stiff spines, from a spot called the areole. Each tubercle bears a groove extending almost to its base -- a feature distinguishing Coryphantha species from similar Mammillaria species, whose tubercles lack such grooves. Depressions between the tubercles may be filled with white wool when the plant is growing, but on older plants the wool may be absent. Atop the tubercles, the areoles are very woolly when young but become almost bare with age.

Among the spine clusters, a single, thick, conical central spine so be present, though often it's missing. Initially it is brown to almost black, but turns gray over time. It is curved in a hook-like shape and measures up to 1.2 cm (0.5 in) long. Around the central spine, if present, arise 17 to 22 white to yellowish radial spines with darker tips, which are a little longer than the central one.

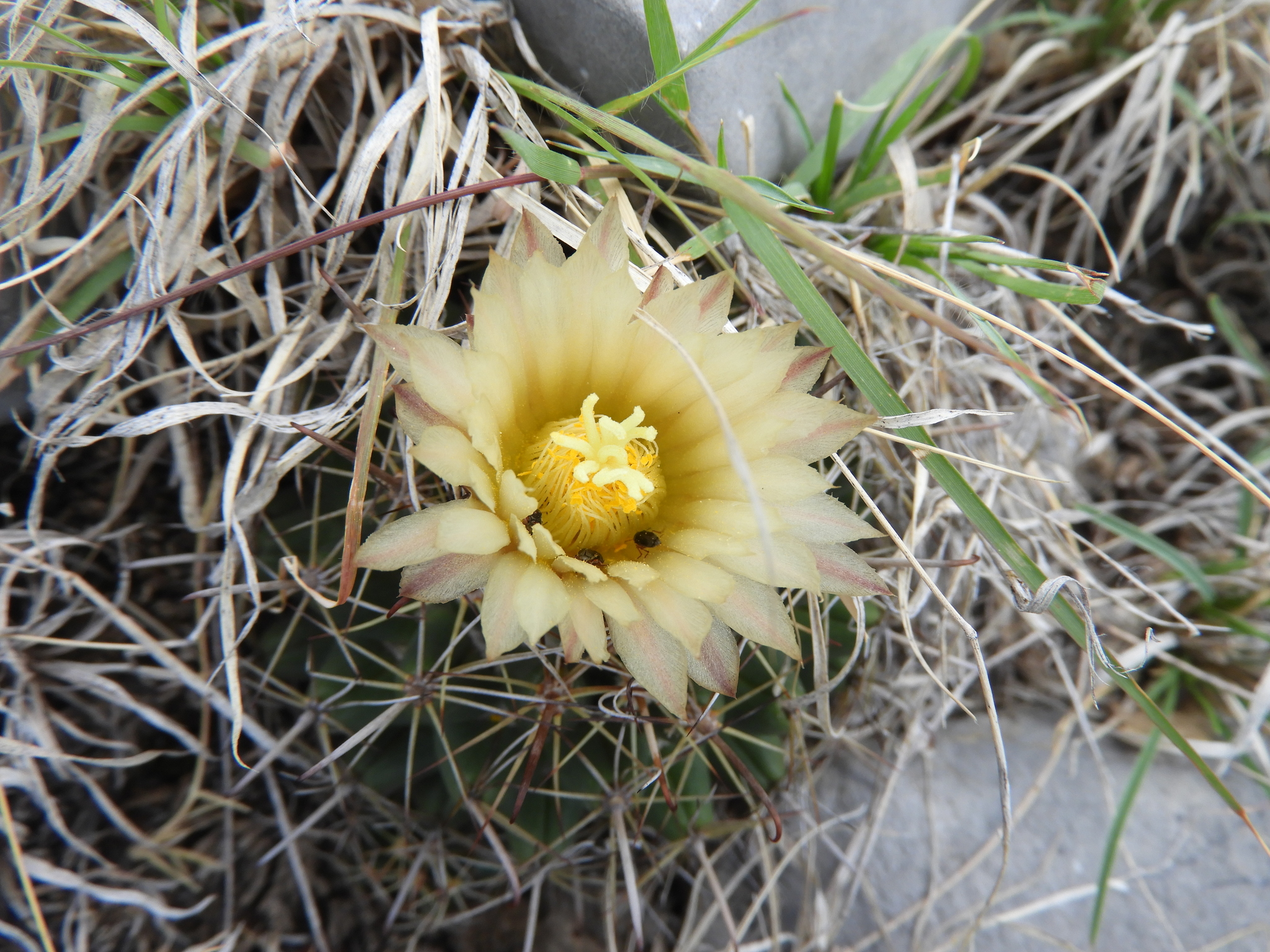
Flower detail

The flowers are yellow, up to 4 cm (1.6 in) long and may spread out as much as 6 cm (2.4 in). The fruits are juicy and green, up to 3 cm (1.2 in) long, and 1.2 cm (0.5 in) in diameter.

== Phenology ==
In its native environment, this cactus flowers from July to September, and bears fruits from August to October.

== Habitat ==
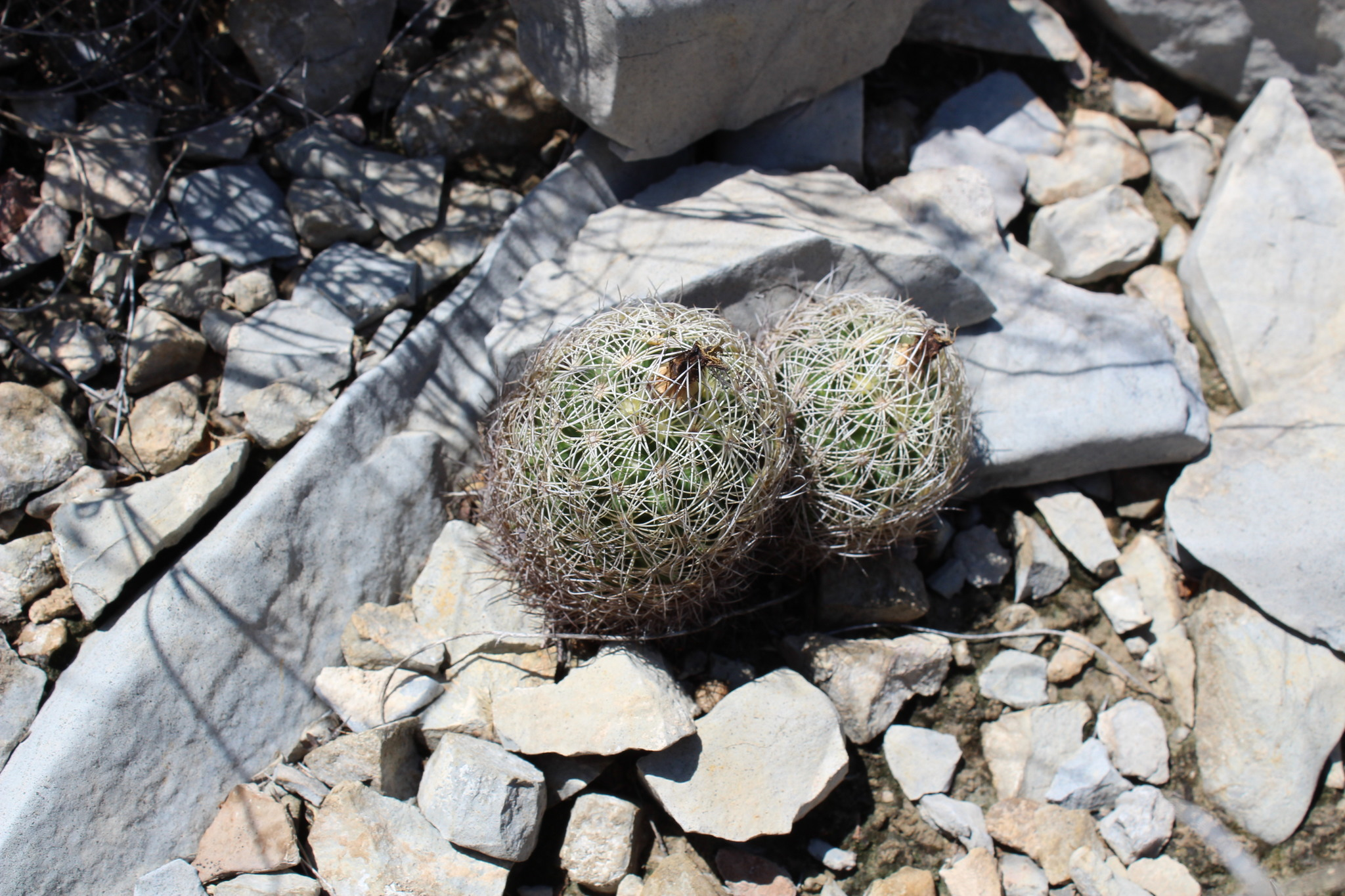
Plants in habitat

Coryphantha delicata inhabits semiarid scrublands and grasslands.

== Distribution ==
The iNaturalist website documents research-grade observations occurring in the northeastern Mexican states of Tamaulipas, Coahuila, Aguascalientes, San Luis Potosí, Nuevo León, Durango, Zacatecas and Guanajuato.

== Taxonomy ==
Coryphantha delicata was described by the US botanist Lewis Bremer and published for the first time in Cactus and Succulent Journal 51: 79, in 1979.

== Etymology ==
The genus name Coryphantha is derived from the Greek coryphe, meaning 'top' or 'head', plus anthos meaning 'flower'; this combination refers to the flowers' location at the apex of the stems. The term delicata, from the Latin deliciarum, meaning "delicate" or smooth, may refer to the species' small size.

== Gardening with Coryphantha delicata ==
Coryphantha delicata often is sold as a potted plant and may be planted in xeriscaping, its attraction being its unusually small, spherical shape and flowers which on such a small body may look oversized. Sometimes plants of this species are sold as Coryphantha palmeri, which is a synonym for Coryphantha compacta.
