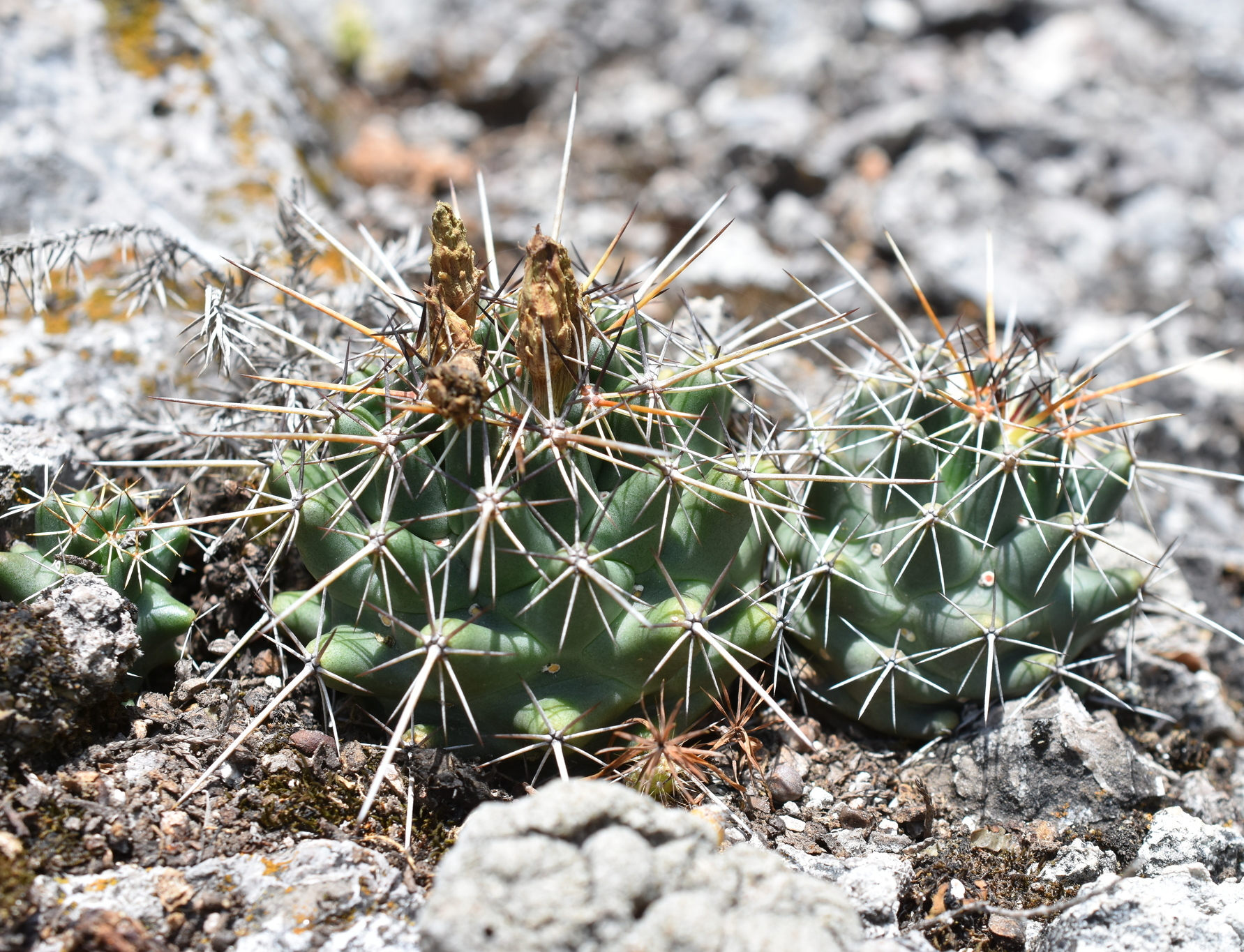

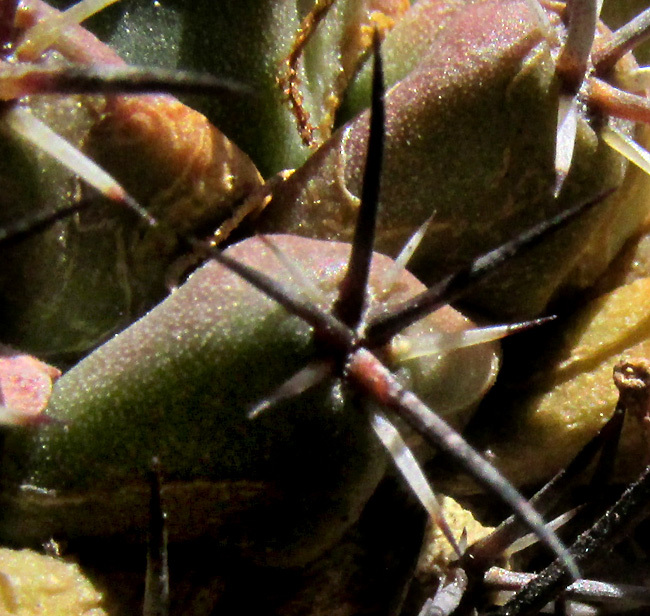

Conservation status
- Least Concern (IUCN 3.1)

Scientific classification
- Kingdom: Plantae
- Clade: Tracheophytes
- Clade: Angiosperms
- Clade: Eudicots
- Order: Caryophyllales
- Family: Cactaceae
- Subfamily: Cactoideae
- Genus: Coryphantha
- Species: C. georgii

Binomial name
- Coryphantha georgii Boed.
- Coryphantha georgii distribution

Synonyms
- Coryphantha grata L.Bremer; Coryphantha villarensis Backeb

= Coryphantha georgii =

Species of cactus endemic just to Mexico

Coryphantha georgii is a species of cactus that is endemic to Mexico.

== Description ==
Coryphantha georgii is a small cactus species that grows solitary, although it can sometimes form small clumps. The glossy, dark green stems range from flattened globose to club shaped, and measure up to 4 cm (1½ inch) tall and about 7 cm (3¾ inches) in diameter. The body's top is woolly, and the cactus develops a taproot.

The body surface is deeply divided into numerous tubercles looking like closely packed, green chili peppers. Atop each tubercle arises a cluster of slender, stiff spines, from a spot called the areole. The areoles are circular, and woolly when young. Arising from the areoles are 8 to 9, thin spines which are white with brown tips. The flowers are white.

== Distribution and habitat ==
The iNaturalist distribution map for Coryphantha georgii shows research-grade observations in the northeastern Mexican states of Tamaulipas, Nuevo León, San Luis Potosí, Guanajuato and Querétaro.

Coryphantha georgii grows at elevations of 1,600 to 2,400 meters (5250-78745 feet) on volcanic soils of plains and slopes, behind rock walls, in grasslands and in clearings of oak forests.

== Taxonomy ==
Coryphantha georgii was described by the German botanist Friedrich Bödeker and first published in the scientific journal Monatsschrift der Deutschen Kakteen-Gesellschaft 3: 163 in 1931.

=== Etymology ===
The genus name Coryphantha is derived from the Greek coryphe, meaning 'top' or 'head', plus anthos meaning 'flower'; this combination refers to the flowers' location at the apex of the stems. The term georgii honors the cactus collector Erich Georgi of Saltillo, Mexico.

== Conservation status ==
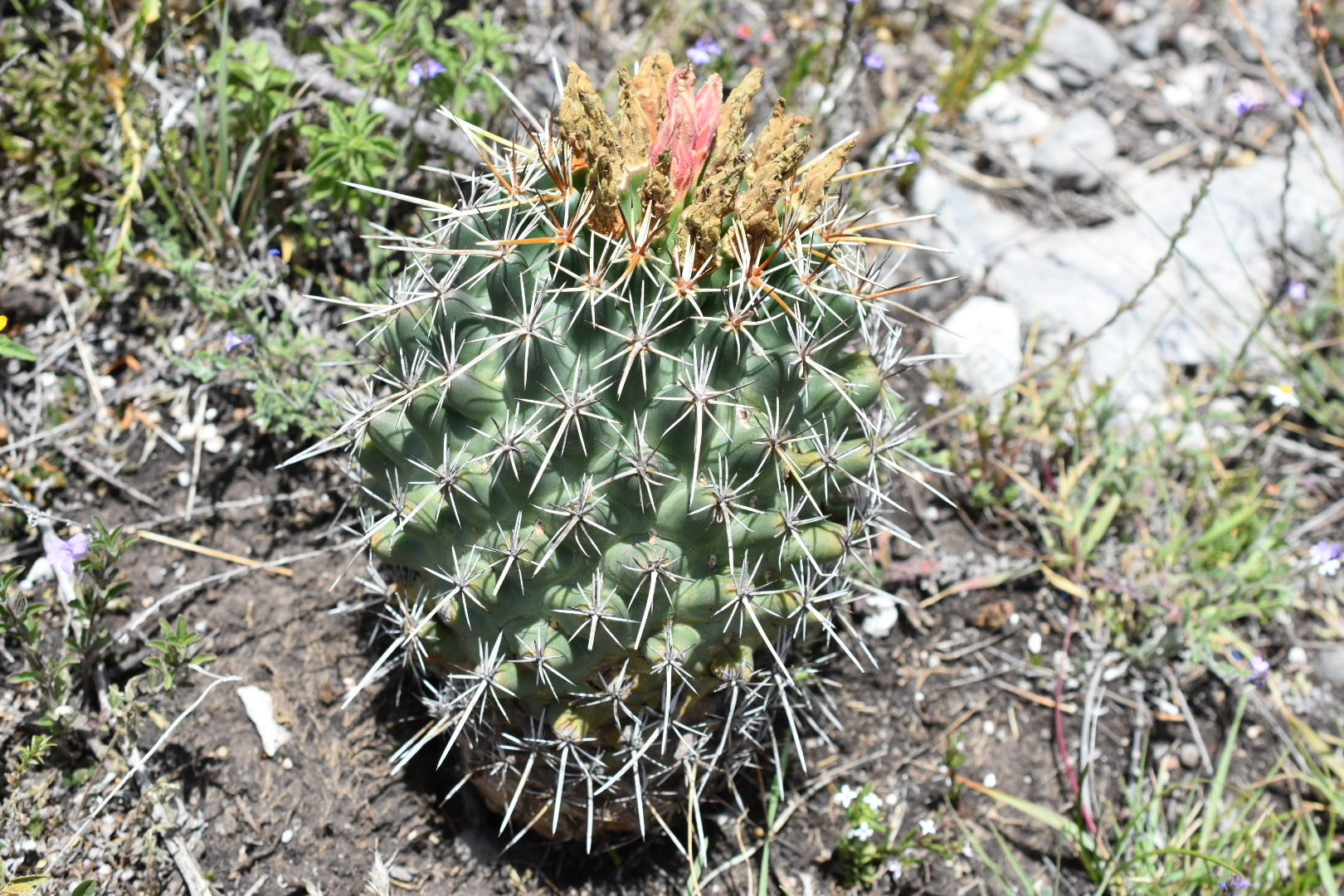
Plant habit

The Red List of Threatened Species of the IUCN classifies Coryphantha georgii as a Species of Least Concern.
