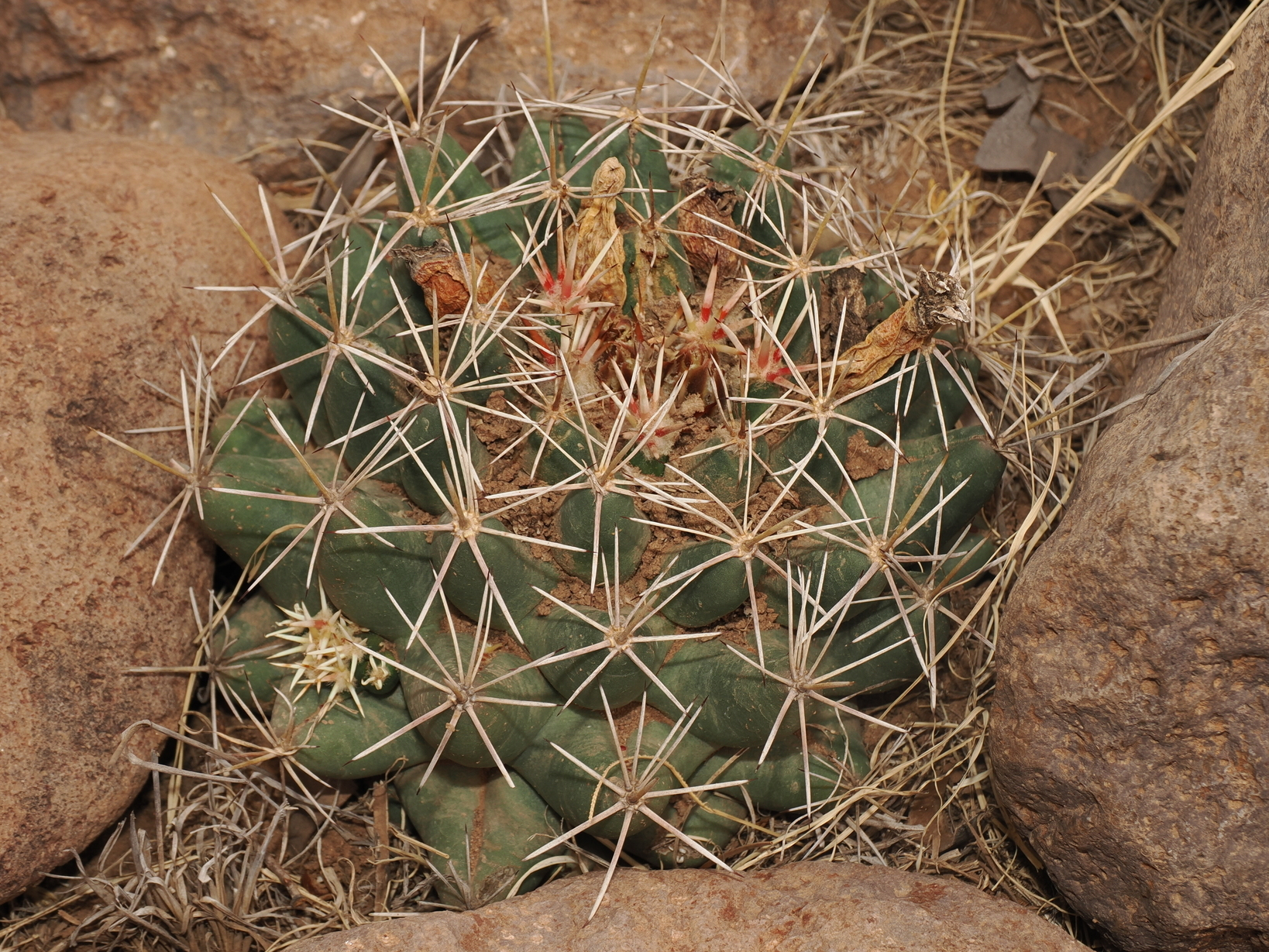

Conservation status
- Endangered (IUCN 3.1)

Scientific classification
- Kingdom: Plantae
- Clade: Tracheophytes
- Clade: Angiosperms
- Clade: Eudicots
- Order: Caryophyllales
- Family: Cactaceae
- Subfamily: Cactoideae
- Genus: Coryphantha
- Species: C. robustispina

Binomial name
- Coryphantha robustispina (Schott ex Engelm.) Britton & Rose

= Coryphantha robustispina =

Species of cactus

Coryphantha robustispina, the Pima pineapple cactus, is a federally protected cactus of the Sonoran Desert. It is commonly found in Pima County, Arizona although it is also found throughout New Mexico and as far east as Texas.

== Etymology ==
The generic name Coryphantha is derived from the Greek--coryphe="head", anthos="flower"; that is to say the plant with a flower on its head. Robustispina means robust spines and needles.

== Taxonomy ==
Coryphantha robustispina was described by (Schott ex Engelm) Britton & Rose and published in The Cactaceae, descriptions and illustrations of plants of the cactus family. 4:33, 1923

Subspecies: Coryphantha robustispina subsp. robustispina, Coryphantha robustispina subsp. sheeri; Coryphantha robustispina subsp. uncinata.

== Description ==
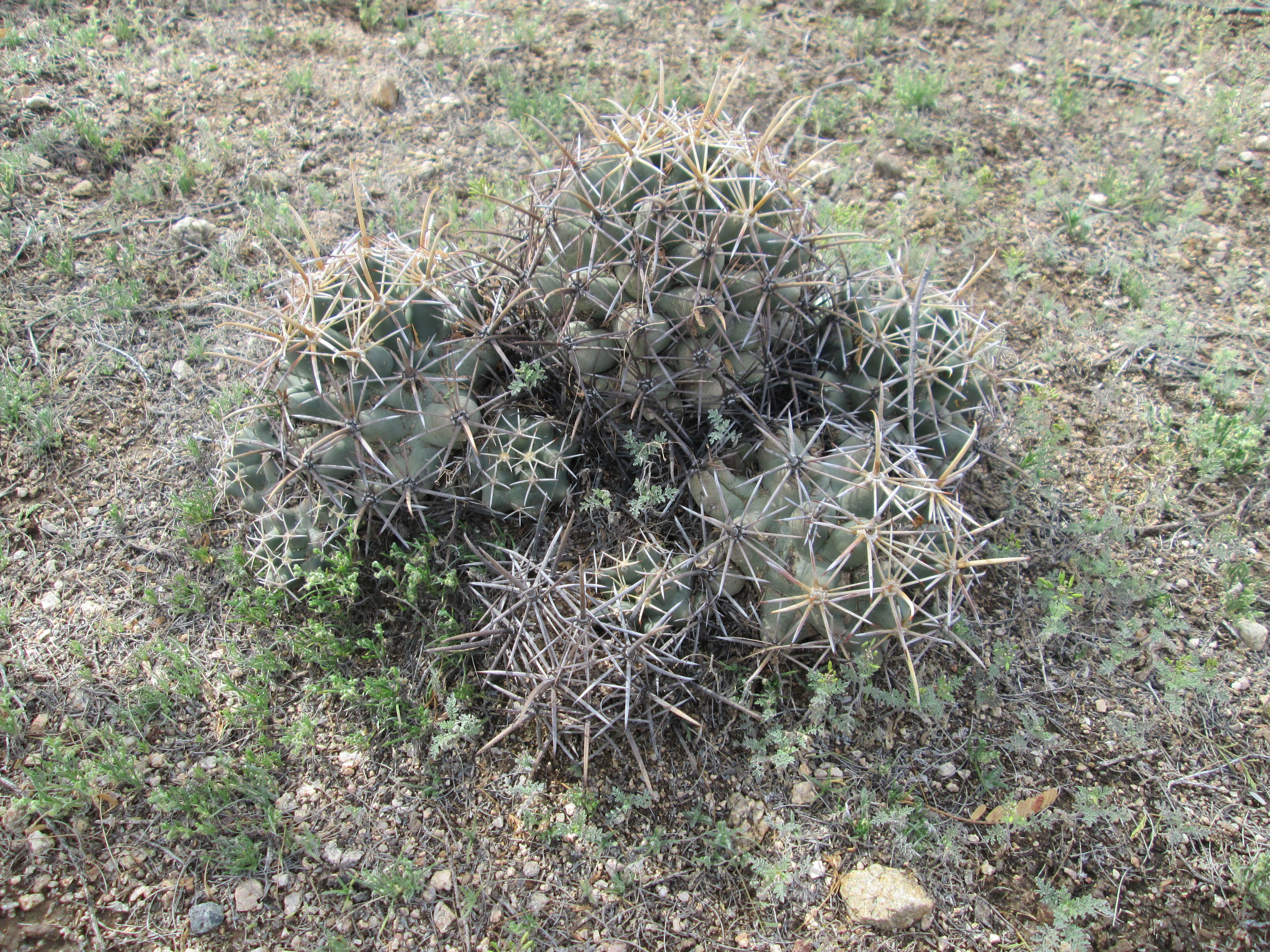
Pima pineapples in Pima County, Arizona.

Coryphantha robustispina grows mostly solitarily with an ovoid shape. It has a clean greyish-greenish color and reaches 5–9 cm tall and 5–15 cm in diameter although larger plants are frequently found. The areolas are oval or cylindrical in shape with a deep furrow and one or two nectar glads. It has 1-4 central spines curved or hooked. They are white or grey with the tip being darker. They measure between 1 and 5 cm in length. The 6-16 radial spines are off-white between 1 and 3 cm in length. Their flowers are golden yellow, pale green or opaque yellow. The seed pods are cylindrical and green up to 5 cm.

== Distribution and habitat ==
Coryphantha robustispina is found in Arizona, New Mexico and Texas in the United States. It also is in Mexico in the states of Chihuahua and Sonora. It is rare. Coryphantha robustispina var. robustispina is on the Federal Endangered Species list, where it is identified using the former nomenclature of Coryphantha scheeri var. robustispina.

== Ecology ==
Coryphantha robustispina has a complicated life cycle:

1) It flowers after a monsoon rain, usually in July. 2) A certain type of bee fertilizes it a couple of days later since the flowers only last a short time. 3) The pods are often eaten by a jack rabbit. 4) The seeds go through the intestines of the jack rabbit and are deposited on the ground in its excrement; and 5) The scat protects the seeds until a special termite eats them and causes the seeds to germinate and then to propagate. This does not apply to cottontail rabbit, as their teeth will damage the seeds.

It is an extremely complicated life cycle and if any one of the steps is interrupted, the plant does not reproduce.

While the above is a typical cycle for the species, seeds collected directly from fruits and not subjected to passing through the intestines of a jackrabbit or other animal can have a high germination rate and be successfully grown into mature plants.
