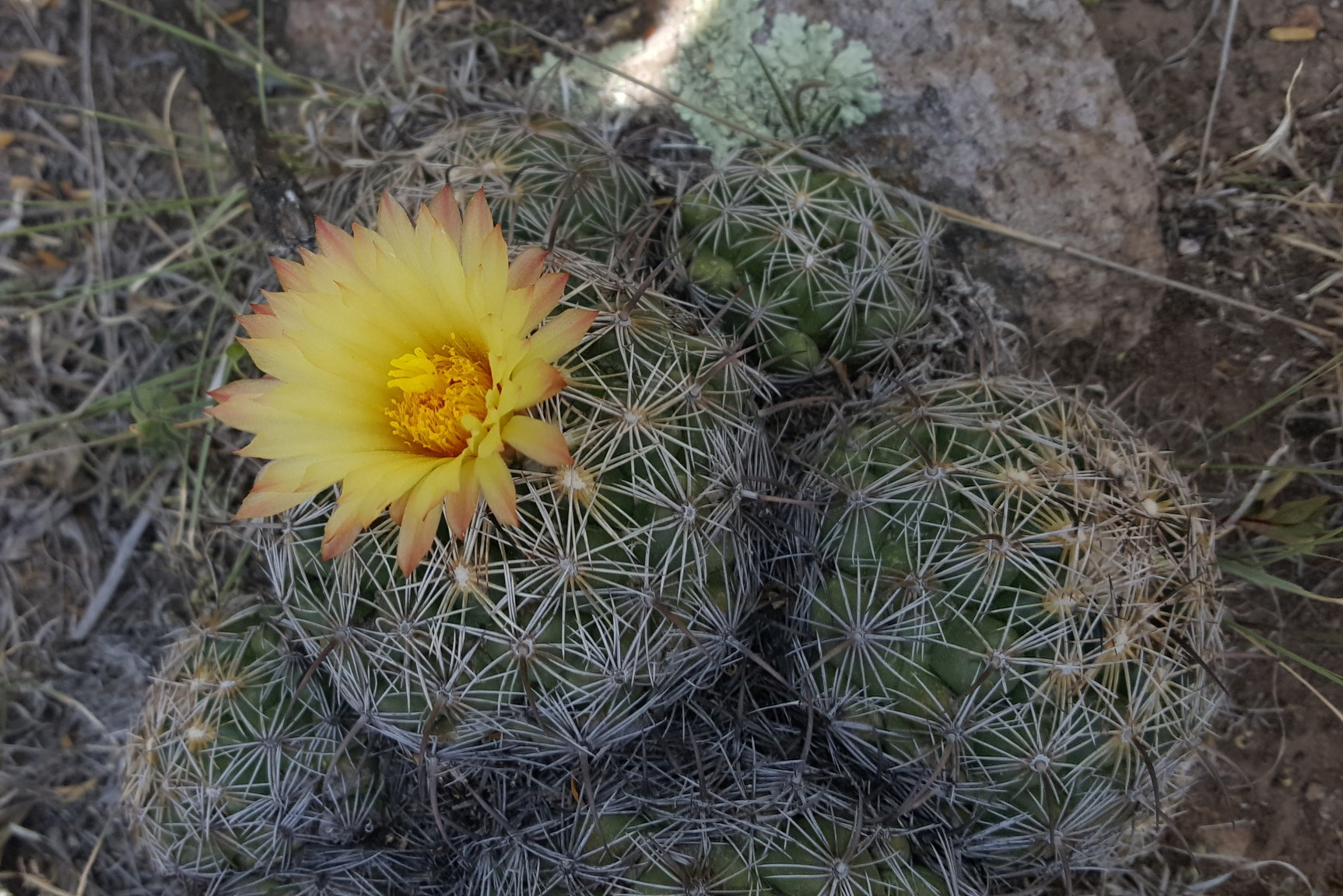

Scientific classification
- Kingdom: Plantae
- Clade: Tracheophytes
- Clade: Angiosperms
- Clade: Eudicots
- Order: Caryophyllales
- Family: Cactaceae
- Subfamily: Cactoideae
- Genus: Coryphantha
- Species: C. cornifera

Binomial name
- Coryphantha cornifera (DC.) Lem.
- Coryphantha cornifera distribution

Synonyms
- see text

= Coryphantha cornifera =

Cactus species found only in Mexico

Coryphantha cornifera is a species of cactus that is endemic to Mexico.

== Description ==
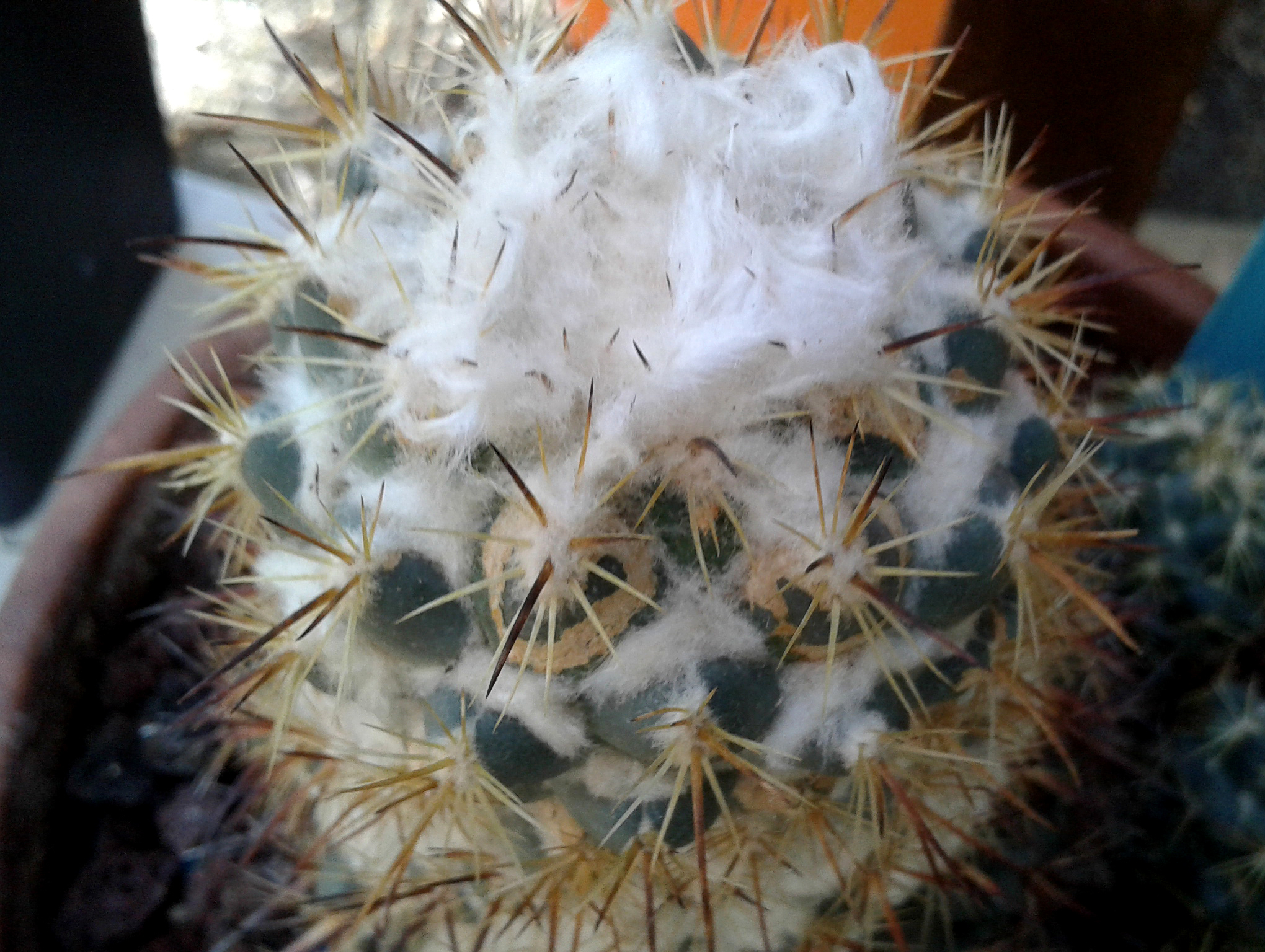
Woolly top of Coryphantha cornifera

Coryphantha cornifera typically but not always grows alone. Its stems range in shape from globose to cylindrical, and its general color is a dull olive-green. The cacti measure 6 to 12 cm (2 to 5 in) tall and 8 to 15 cm (3 to 6 in) in diameter, and have fibrous or semi-fibrous roots. The cactus's top, at least on older plants, is blunt, depressed, and may be covered with white wool. The cactus's surface is divided into numerous tubercles looking like the bottoms of green chili peppers. Atop each tubercle spines arise from special areas called areoles; this species' areoles typically produce 12–18 radiating spines, and often 1–4 longer and more robust central spines; spine arrangement is highly variable.

== Habitat ==
Coryphantha cornifera inhabits semi-arid scrub and grasslands, and occasionally disturbed areas oak forests. The species shows a preference for limestone in flat or gently sloping areas. It inhabits elevations of 1,400–2,200 meters (4600–7200 feet). It flowers from June to July, sometimes extending into September.

== Distribution ==
Coryphantha cornifera is endemic just to highland central Mexico. The iNaturalist website page for the species documents research-grade observations in the Mexican states of Zacatecas, San Luis Potosí, Jalisco, Guanajuato, Querétaro and Hidalgo.

== Etymology ==
The generic name Coryphantha derives from the Greek coryphe, meaning "top" or "head", and anthos meaning "flower"; the whole genus name refers to the flowers appearing atop the stems. The species name "cornifera" is derived from the Latin words cornus, meaning "horn") and fer meaning "bearing"; this refers to the usually present, larger and more robust central spine or spines of the species, which may be shaped like a horn or hook.

== Synonyms ==
The taxon Coryphantha cornifera has been known by these 50 synonyms:

Homotypic Synonyms

- Cactus cornifer (DC.) Kuntze in Revis. Gen. Pl. 1: 260 (1891)
- Echinocactus cornifer (DC.) Poselg. in Allg. Gartenzeitung 21: 102 (1853)
- Mammillaria cornifera DC. in Mém. Mus. Hist. Nat. 17: 112 (1828)

Heterotypic Synonyms

- Cactus pfeifferianus (de Vriese) Kuntze in Revis. Gen. Pl. 1: 261 (1891)
- Cactus radians (DC.) Kuntze in Revis. Gen. Pl. 1: 261 (1891)
- Cactus radians var. pectinoides J.M.Coult. in Contr. U.S. Natl. Herb. 3: 144 (1894)
- Cactus scolymoides (Scheidw.) Kuntze in Revis. Gen. Pl. 1: 261 (1891)
- Coryphantha bernalensis L.Bremer in Cact. Succ. J. (Los Angeles) 56: 165 (1984)
- Coryphantha cornifera var. scolymoides (Scheidw.) Borg in Cacti: 292 (1937)
- Coryphantha cornuta (Hildm. ex K.Schum.) A.Berger in Kakteen: 339 (1929)
- Coryphantha daimonoceras (Lem.) A.Berger in Kakteen: 339 (1929)
- Coryphantha impexicoma Lem. ex C.F.Först. in Handb. Cakteenk., ed. 2: 414 (1885)
- Coryphantha maliterrarum L.Bremer in Cact. Succ. J. (Los Angeles) 56: 71 (1984)
- Coryphantha radians (DC.) Britton & Rose in Cact. 4: 36 (1923)
- Coryphantha radians var. impexicoma (Lem.) Backeb. & F.M.Knuth in Kaktus-ABC: 370 (1936)
- Coryphantha radians var. pectinoides (J.M.Coult.) Bravo in Cact. Suc. Mex. 27: 17 (1982)
- Coryphantha schwarziana Boed. in Mammillarien-Vergleichs-Schluessel: 12 (1933)
- Coryphantha scolymoides (Scheidw.) A.Berger in Kakteen: 271 (1929), nom. rej. prop.
- Echinocactus cornifer var. impexicomus (Lem.) Poselg. in Allg. Gartenzeitung 21: 102 (1853)
- Echinocactus cornifer var. longisetus Poselg. in Allg. Gartenzeitung 21: 102 (1853)
- Echinocactus cornifer var. muticus Poselg. in Allg. Gartenzeitung 21: 102 (1853)
- Echinocactus cornifer var. nigricans Poselg. in Allg. Gartenzeitung 21: 102 (1853)
- Echinocactus cornifer var. scolymoides (Scheidw.) Poselg. in Allg. Gartenzeitung 21: 102 (1853)
- Echinocactus radicans (DC.) Poselg. in Allg. Gartenzeitung 21: 107 (1853)
- Mammillaria cornifera var. impexicoma (Lem.) Salm-Dyck in Cact. Hort. Dyck.: 20 (1850)
- Mammillaria cornifera var. mutica Salm-Dyck in Cact. Hort. Dyck.: 20 (1845)
- Mammillaria cornifera f. scolymoides (Scheidw.) Schelle in Kakteen: 290 (1926)
- Mammillaria cornuta Hildm. ex K.Schum. in Gesamtbeschr. Kakt.: 496 (1898)
- Mammillaria daemonoceras Lem. ex C.F.Först. in Handb. Cakteenk.: 251 (1846)
- Mammillaria daimonoceras Lem. in Cact. Aliq. Nov.: 5 (1838)
- Mammillaria demonoceras Jacques in Ann. Fl. Pomone 6: 294 (1838), nom. superfl.
- Mammillaria demonoceras var. impexicoma (Lem.) A.Cels & J.F.Cels in Ann. Fl. Pomone 6: 295 (1838), nom. superfl.
- Mammillaria impexicoma Lem. in Cact. Aliq. Nov.: 5 (1838)
- Mammillaria pfeifferiana de Vriese in Tijdschr. Natuurl. Gesch. Physiol. 6: 51 (1839)
- Mammillaria pfeifferiana var. altissima Scheidw. in Bull. Acad. Roy. Sci. Bruxelles 6: 93 (1839)
- Mammillaria pfeifferiana var. dichotoma Scheidw. in Bull. Acad. Roy. Sci. Bruxelles 6: 93 (1839)
- Mammillaria pfeifferiana var. flaviceps Scheidw. in Bull. Acad. Roy. Sci. Bruxelles 6: 93 (1839)
- Mammillaria pfeifferiana var. fulvispina Scheidw. in Bull. Acad. Roy. Sci. Bruxelles 6: 93 (1839)
- Mammillaria pfeifferiana var. variabilis Scheidw. in Bull. Acad. Roy. Sci. Bruxelles 6: 93 (1839)
- Mammillaria radians DC. in Mém. Mus. Hist. Nat. 17: 111 (1828)
- Mammillaria radians var. daimonoceras (Lem.) K.Schum. in Gesamtbeschr. Kakt.: 496 (1898)
- Mammillaria radians f. daimonoceras (Lem.) Schelle in Handb. Kakteenkult.: 241 (1907)
- Mammillaria radians var. globosa Scheidw. in Bull. Acad. Roy. Sci. Bruxelles 5: 494 (1838)
- Mammillaria radians f. impexicoma (Lem.) Schelle in Handb. Kakteenkult.: 240 (1907)
- Mammillaria radians var. impexicoma (Lem.) Salm-Dyck ex K.Schum. in Gesamtbeschr. Kakt.: 495 (1898)
- Mammillaria radians var. scolymoides (Scheidw.) Schelle in Handb. Kakteenkult.: 241 (1907)
- Mammillaria scolymoides Scheidw. in Allg. Gartenzeitung 9: 44 (1841)
- Mammillaria scolymoides var. longiseta Salm-Dyck in Cact. Hort. Dyck., ed. 2: 132 (1850)
- Mammillaria scolymoides var. nigricans Salm-Dyck in Cact. Hort. Dyck., ed. 2: 132 (1850)
- Mammillaria scolymoides var. raphidacantha Salm-Dyck in Cact. Hort. Dyck., ed. 2: 132 (1850)
