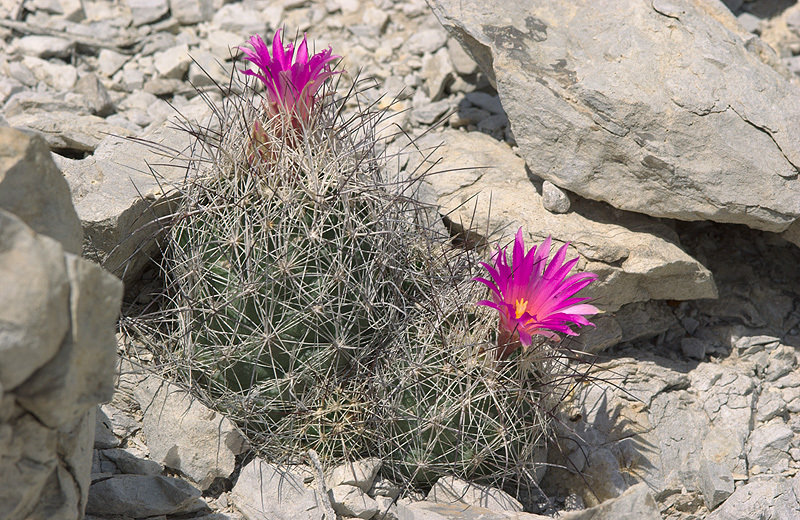

Conservation status
- Secure (NatureServe)

Scientific classification
- Kingdom: Plantae
- Clade: Tracheophytes
- Clade: Angiosperms
- Clade: Eudicots
- Order: Caryophyllales
- Family: Cactaceae
- Subfamily: Cactoideae
- Genus: Coryphantha
- Species: C. ramillosa

Binomial name
- Coryphantha ramillosa Cutak

= Coryphantha ramillosa =

Species of cactus

Coryphantha ramillosa is a rare species of cactus known by the common names bunched cory cactus and whiskerbush. It is native to the border region between Texas in the United States and Coahuila in Mexico. Because it was believed to be rare and threatened by a number of processes, it was federally listed as a threatened species of the United States in 1979.

The range and abundance of this plant are not well known, especially within Mexico, and it may not be as uncommon as was thought in 1979. The cactus occurs in at least seven locations in Texas, several being within the bounds of Big Bend National Park. One of the most recent estimates of abundance in Texas is 5,000 to 10,000 individuals in two counties. The range of appropriate habitat in Mexico covers 2.5 times the amount of land as in Texas. Many of the plants are located in remote areas, which helps protect them from people. A major threat to the species is harvesting by cactus enthusiasts and dealers.

This cactus is generally spherical or cylindrical in shape, and unbranched. It grows up to about 9.5 centimeters long and is textured with protruding areoles up to 2 centimeters tall. The areoles bear curving spines, the central one thick, dark, and up to 4.3 centimeters in length. The smaller spines are light in color, often white. The showy flower occurs at the apex of the cactus body and measures up to 6.5 centimeters long. Its tepals are pink, lightening to pale pink or white near the center, and sometimes with darker mid-stripes. The rounded fruit is pale to dark green, fleshy and juicy and 1 or 2 centimeters long. The plant blooms in the summer, with an extended blooming period when rainfall is higher.

The cactus occurs in desert scrub habitat, generally in dry, rocky, barely accessible areas where few other plants grow. The substrate is limestone.

The plant is being propagated and studied at Desert Botanical Garden in Phoenix, Arizona.
