= Coryphantha clavata =

Conservation status
- Least Concern (IUCN 3.1)

Scientific classification
- Kingdom: Plantae
- Clade: Tracheophytes
- Clade: Angiosperms
- Clade: Eudicots
- Order: Caryophyllales
- Family: Cactaceae
- Subfamily: Cactoideae
- Genus: Coryphantha
- Species: C. clavata

Binomial name
- Coryphantha clavata (Scheidw) Backeb
- Native range

Synonyms
- Mammillaria clavata Scheidw. (basionym); Neolloydia clavata (Scheidw.) Britton & Rose

Species of cactus

Coryphantha clavata, commonly known in Spanish as biznaga de porra (which translates as "club barrel cactus"), is a species of succulent flowering plant in the genus Coryphantha, within the family Cactaceae. It is endemic to northeastern Mexico.

== Description ==
Coryphantha clavata is a species of cactus that usually has a solitary habit, although it can sometimes form clumps. The stems are erect, and although juvenile stems are globose in shape, they later elongate and become club-shaped; that is, they have a larger diameter at the apex than at the base. The epidermis is dark blue-green in color with red tones. The stem measures 10-30 cm in height and 4-7 cm in diameter. The apex is covered in dense, woolly trichomes, and the taproot is turnip-shaped.

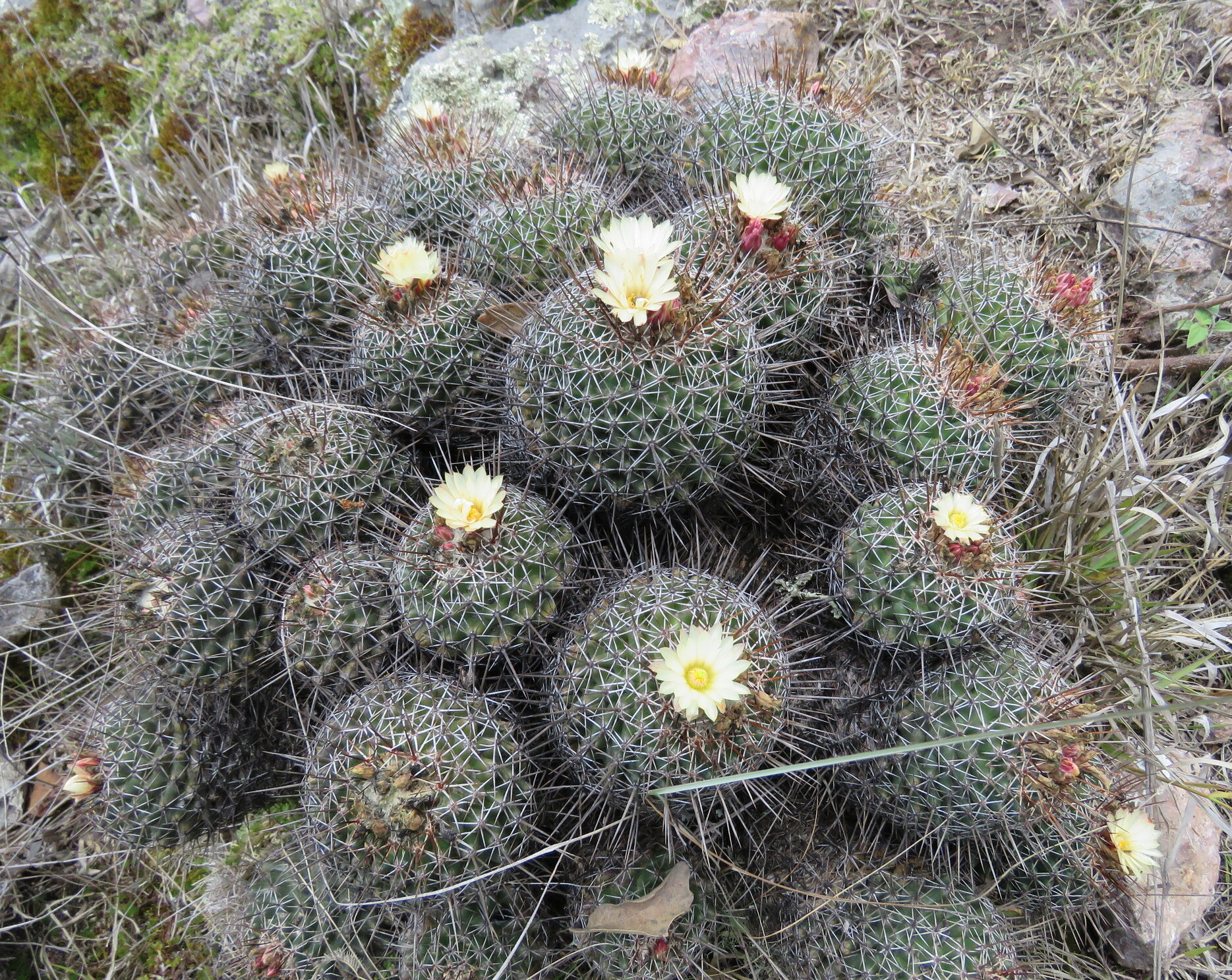
Growing in a clump

The stems have widely-spaces and obliquely-conical tubercles, whose axils are covered in white wool when juvenile. The tubercles are up to 2 cm in length and are arranged in 5, 8, or 13 rows. They have a shallow groove that extends almost to their base, and on them are situated the round, white areoles. The areoles measure approximately 3 mm in diameter; they have spines and 1-2 large red nectar glands.

Among the spines, there is 1 central spine (which may be absent) that measures 2-3 cm in length and is yellowish to brown in color and usually has dark bands. It is straight to curved or even hooked. There are also 6-12 radial spines measuring 0.8-1.5 cm in length; these are brown in color, with reddish bases and dark apices.

The flowers develop in an apical position. They measure 2-5 cm in length and up to 4 cm in diameter. They are a bright light yellow color. The outer tepals are linear and acute, with a wide, brown central vein. The inner tepals are linear, narrow, and creamy white in color. The stamens are pinkish in color, and much shorter than the tepals. The style is pink in color, and the 5-6 lobes of the stigma are short and greenish in color.

The fruits are light green in color and measure approximately 2 cm in length. They are juicy and have a dark red skin. The seeds are kidney-shaped and brown, measuring approximately 1 mm in length.

== Distribution and habitat ==
Coryphantha clavata is native to northeastern Mexico in the states of Aguascalientes, Guanajuato, Jalisco, San Luis Potosí, and Zacatecas. It is found primarily in desert or dry scrubland biomes at elevations of 1700 to 1800 meters above sea level.

It grows in grassland habitats in sandy soils, especially on the shallow slopes of limestone or volcanic hills underneath shrubs, Agave, or Hechtia.

== Taxonomy ==
Coryphantha clavata was first described as Mammillaria clavata, a name published in 1838 by the Belgian botanist Michael Joseph François Scheidweiler in the scientific journal Bulletin de l'Académie Royale des Sciences et Belles-lettres de Bruxelles 5: 494.

Later, the German botanist Curt Backeberg transferred this species to the genus Coryphantha, renaming it Coryphantha clavata. He registered these changes in the scientific journal Cactaceae. Jahrbücher der Deutschen Kakteen-Gesellschaft 1941 (2): 61, published in 1942.

Etymology

- Coryphantha: The genus name is derived from the Greek words koryphē (meaning "top" or "head") and anthos (meaning "flower"), referring to how the flowers of this genys form at the tops of the stems.
- clavata: The specific epithet is Latin for "club-shaped", referring to how this species' stems are wider at the apex than at the base.

=== Subspecies ===
As of October 2026, two subspecies are accepted by Plants of the World Online:

Image	Subspecies	Description	Distribution
	Coryphantha clavata subsp. clavata	1-5 central spines; these may be straight or hooked, and the flowers are light yellow in color.	Northeastern Mexico
	Coryphantha clavata subsp. stipitata (Scheidw.) Dicht & A.Lüthy, 2001	Only one central spine.	Northeastern Mexico

Synonyms
- Synonyms of Coryphantha clavata subsp. clavata:
  - Cactus ancistracanthus (Lem.) Kuntze, 1891
  - Cactus rhaphidacanthus (Lem.) Kuntze, 1891
  - Coryphantha ancistracantha (Lem.) Lem., 1868
  - Coryphantha clavata var. ancistracantha (Lem.) Heinrich ex Backeb., 1961
  - Coryphantha clavata var. radicalissima (Quehl) Heinrich ex Backeb., 1961
  - Coryphantha raphidacantha (Lem.) Lem., 1868
  - Coryphantha raphidacantha var. ancistracantha (Lem.) Y.Itô, 1952
  - Coryphantha unicornis Boed., 1928
  - Echinocactus cornifer var. raphidacanthus (Lem.) Poselg., 1853
  - Mammillaria ancistracantha Lem., 1839
  - Mammillaria humilior (Salm-Dyck ex CFFörst.) CFFörst. former K. Schum., 1898
  - Mammillaria radicalissima Quehl, 1912
  - Mammillaria raphidacantha Lem., 1839
  - Mammillaria rhaphidacantha Lem., 1839
  - Mammillaria rhaphidacantha var. ancistracantha (Lem.) K. Schum., 1898
  - Mammillaria rhaphidacantha f. ancistracantha (Lem.) Schelle, 1907
  - Mammillaria rhaphidacantha var. humilior Salm-Dyck ex CFFörst., 1846
  - Mammillaria sulcoglandulifera Jacobi, 1856
- Synonyms of Coryphantha clavata subsp. stipitata
  - Mammillaria stipitata Scheidw., 1838

== Conservation status ==
On the IUCN Red List, Coryphantha clavata is classified as being of Least Concern (LC).

There are no known significant threats to this species' survival; however, habitat destruction caused by livestock ranching may affect populations due to the fact that in many locations, fire is used to clear the land for grazing.

== Cultivation ==
This species is cultivated mainly as an ornamental. It may be propagated vegetatively via cuttings, or via seed.

== Gallery ==
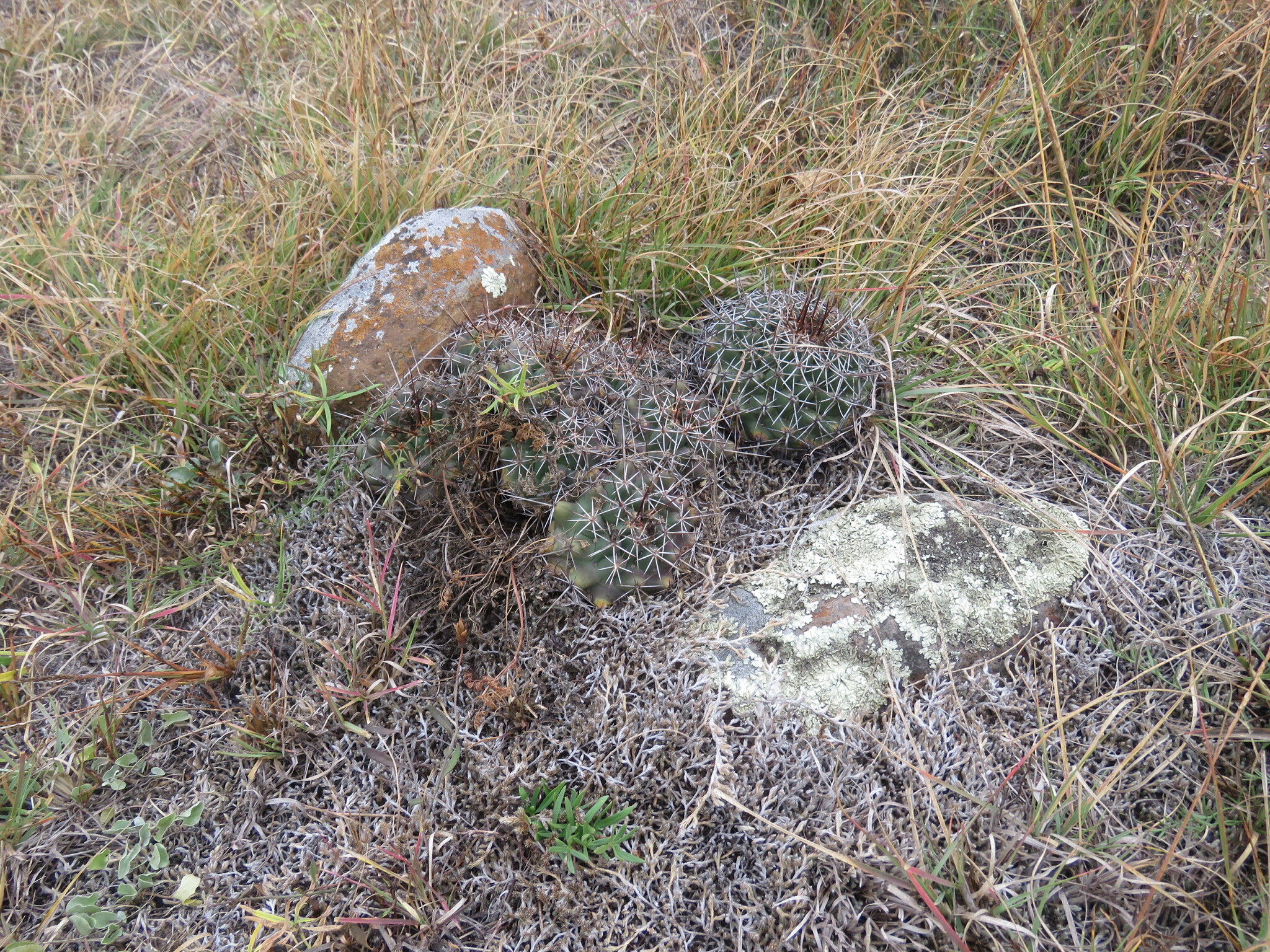
Plant in habitat

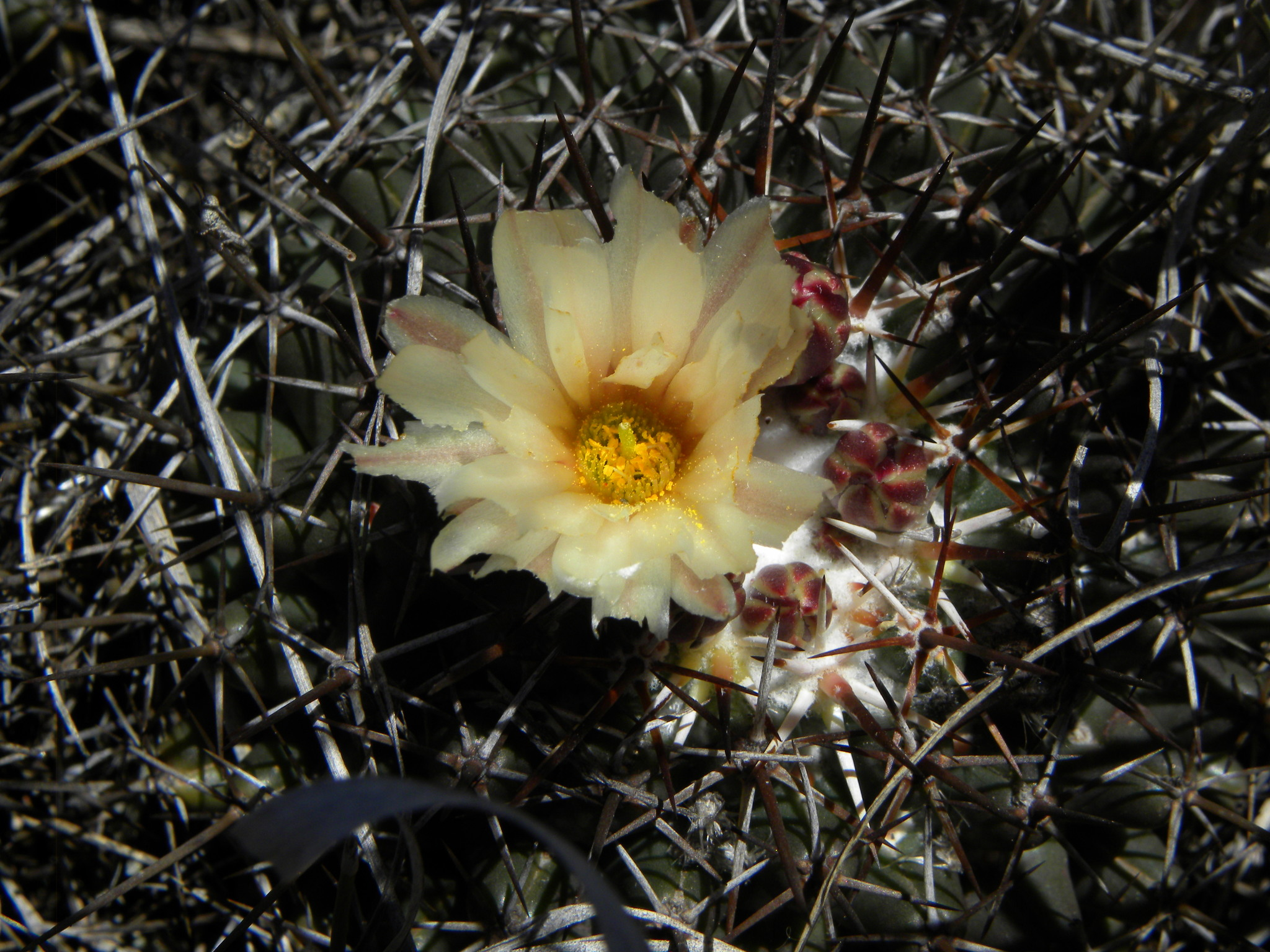
Flower

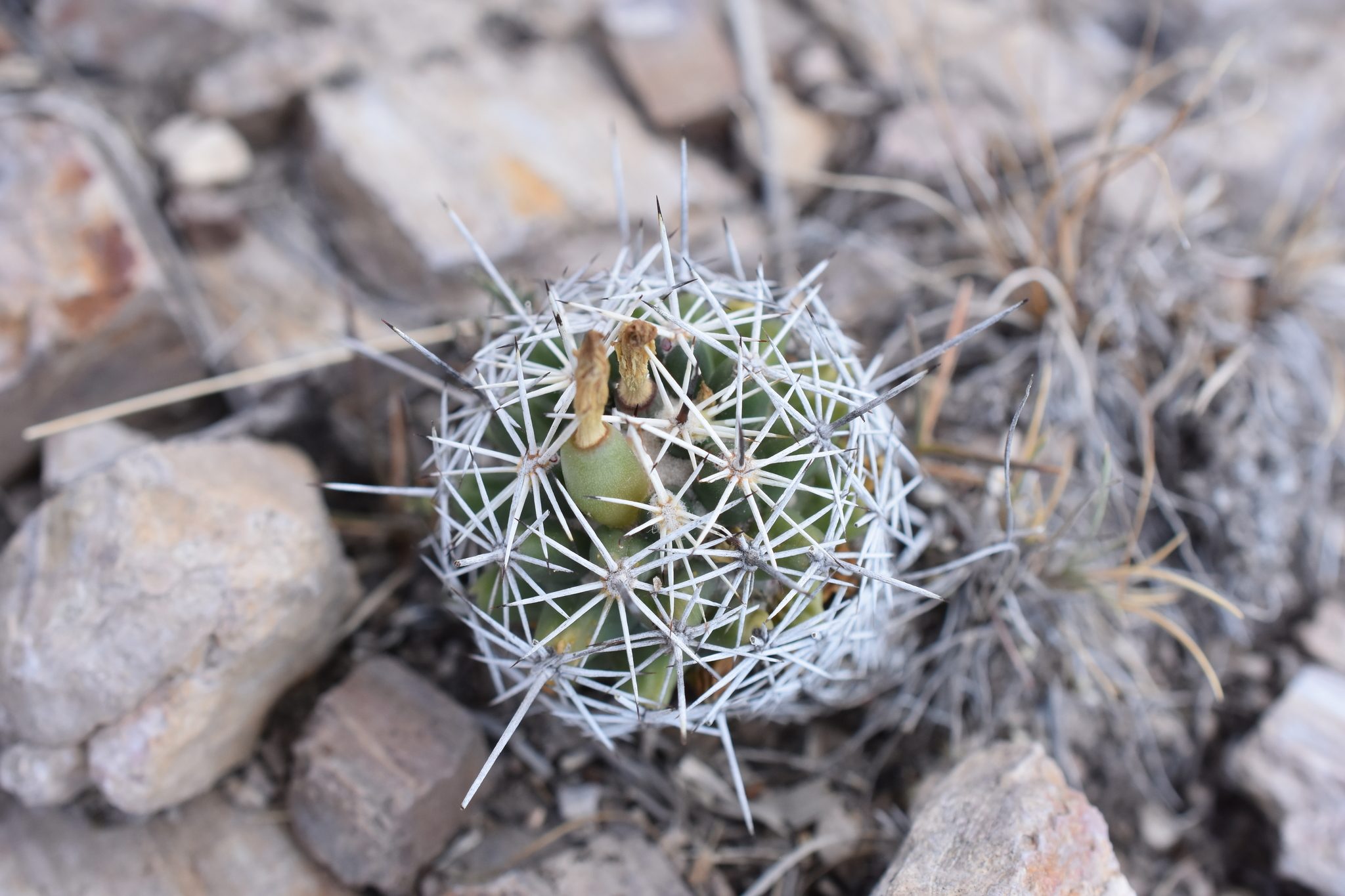
Plant with developing fruit

Plant with fruits

Young plants
