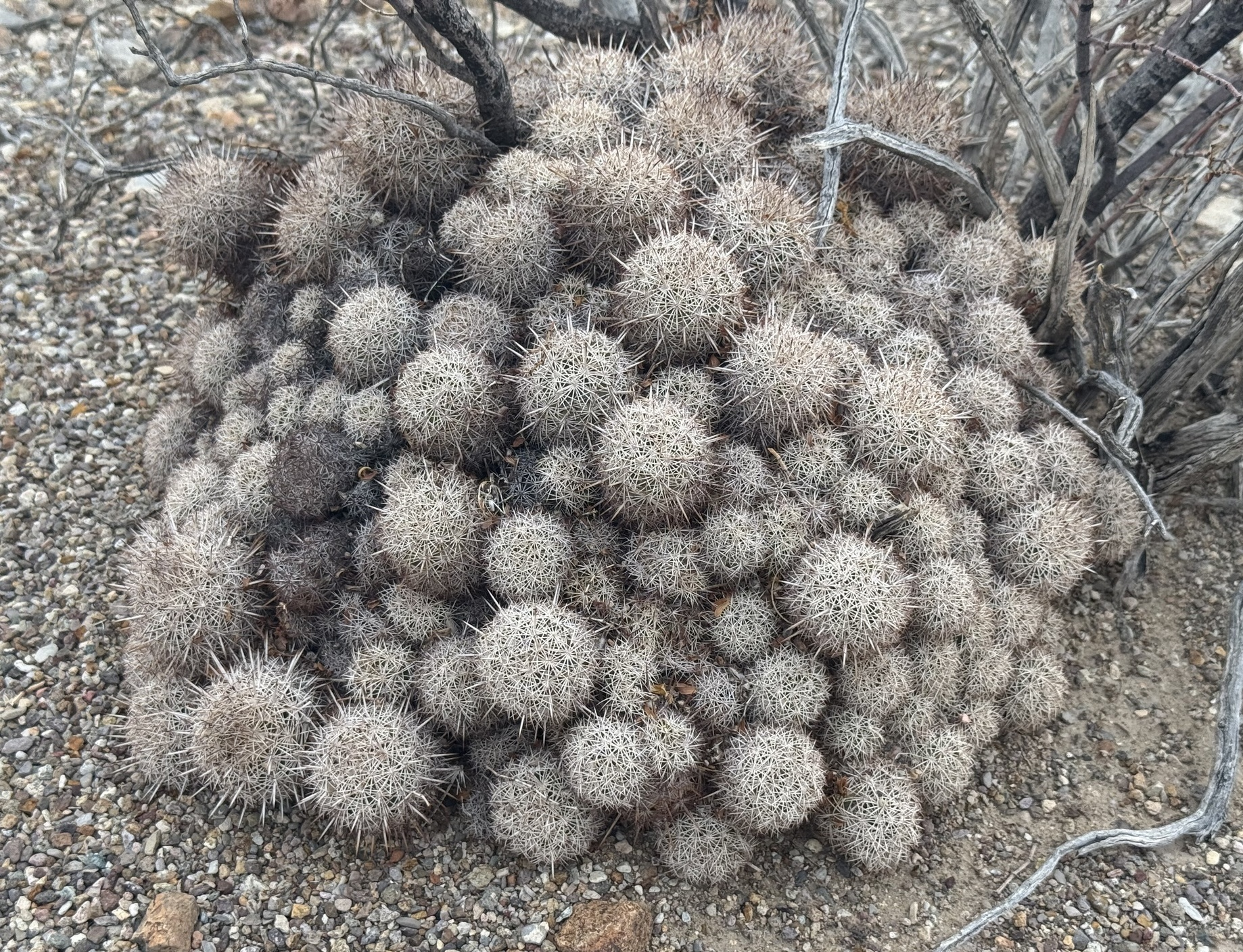

Conservation status
- Least Concern (IUCN 3.1)

Scientific classification
- Kingdom: Plantae
- Clade: Tracheophytes
- Clade: Angiosperms
- Clade: Eudicots
- Order: Caryophyllales
- Family: Cactaceae
- Subfamily: Cactoideae
- Genus: Coryphantha
- Species: C. echinus

Binomial name
- Coryphantha echinus (Engelm.) Britton & Rose

Synonyms
- Mammillaria echinus Engelm.

= Coryphantha echinus =

Species of cactus

Coryphantha echinus is a species of cactus known by the common names of sea urchin cactus, hedgehog Cory cactus or rhinoceros cactus. C. echinus is found in the south and east portion of the Trans-Pecos to Del Rio, Chihuahua, Coahuila and sporadically in the northeast Trans-Pecos. The plant normally occurs in solitary groupings, but sometimes grows as a clump. It produces short-lived yellow flowers that last for a couple of hours between April and July. After flowering, it produces green fruits.

Coryphantha echinus was first collected by Charles Wright in 1849 and was later described as Mammillaria echinus by George Engelmann.
