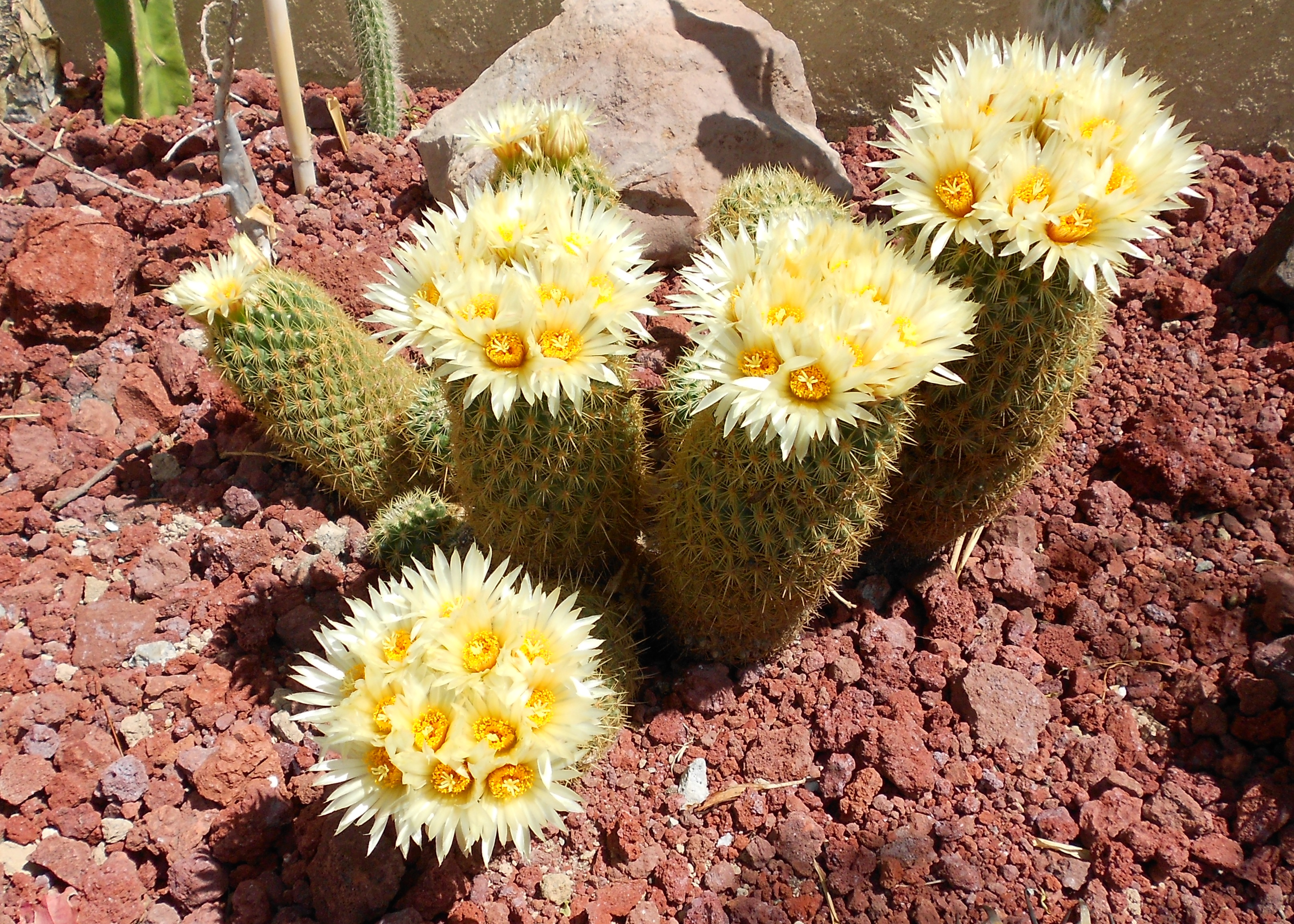

Conservation status
- Least Concern (IUCN 3.1)

Scientific classification
- Kingdom: Plantae
- Clade: Tracheophytes
- Clade: Angiosperms
- Clade: Eudicots
- Order: Caryophyllales
- Family: Cactaceae
- Subfamily: Cactoideae
- Genus: Coryphantha
- Species: C. erecta

Binomial name
- Coryphantha erecta (Lem. ex Pfeiff.) Lem.
- Coryphantha erecta range

Synonyms
- Cactus erectus (Lem. ex Pfeiff.) Kuntze 1891; Echinocactus erectus (Lem. ex Pfeiff.) Poselg. 1853; Glandulifera erecta (Lem. ex Pfeiff.) Frič 1924; Mammillaria erecta Lem. ex Pfeiff. 1837; Cactus ceratocentrus (A.Berg) Kuntze 1891; Mammillaria ceratocentra A.Berg 1840; Mammillaria evanescens C.F.Först. 1846

= Coryphantha erecta =

Species of cactus

Coryphantha erecta is a species of Coryphantha found in Mexico.

== Description ==
Coryphantha erecta branches from the base and forms clumps. The cylindrical bright green shoots reach heights of up to 50 centimeters with diameters of 5 to 8 centimeters. The conical warts, which are up to 8 millimeters long, are loosely placed together. The axillae bear white wool and yellow nectar glands. The two, rarely four, yellowish-brown central spines are directed downwards and up to 2 centimeters long. The eight to thirteen golden-brown, up to 1.2 centimeter long, marginal spines are spread out, straight and pimpled.

The short, funnel-shaped, almost wheel-shaped yellow flowers are 5 to 6 centimeters long and reach a diameter of up to 7.5 centimeters. The cylindrical green fruits reach a length of up to 1.5 centimeters.

== Distribution ==
Coryphantha erecta is common on slopes with limestone gravel in the Mexican states of Hidalgo, Guanajuato and Querétaro.

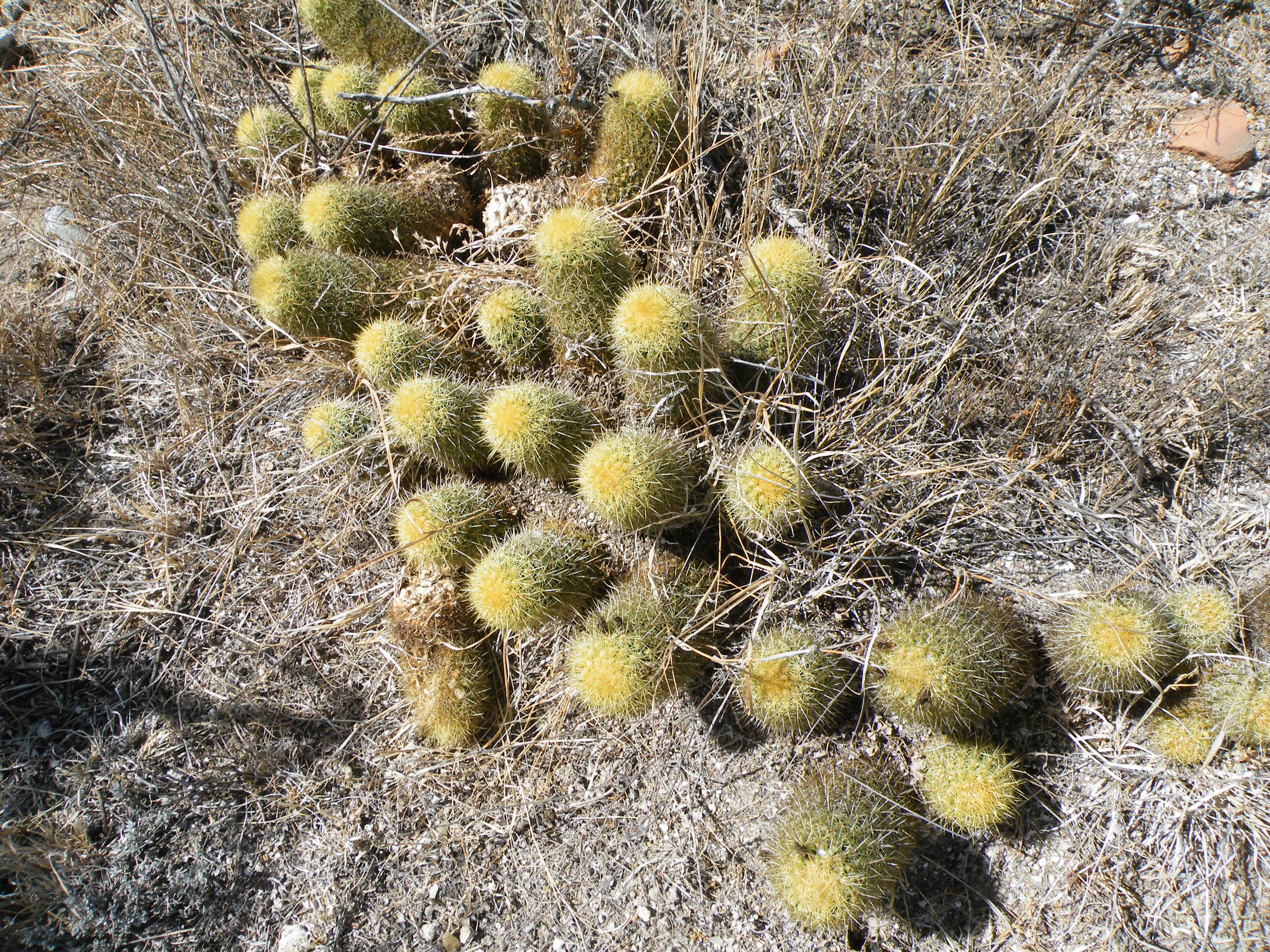
Plants growing in Guanajuato

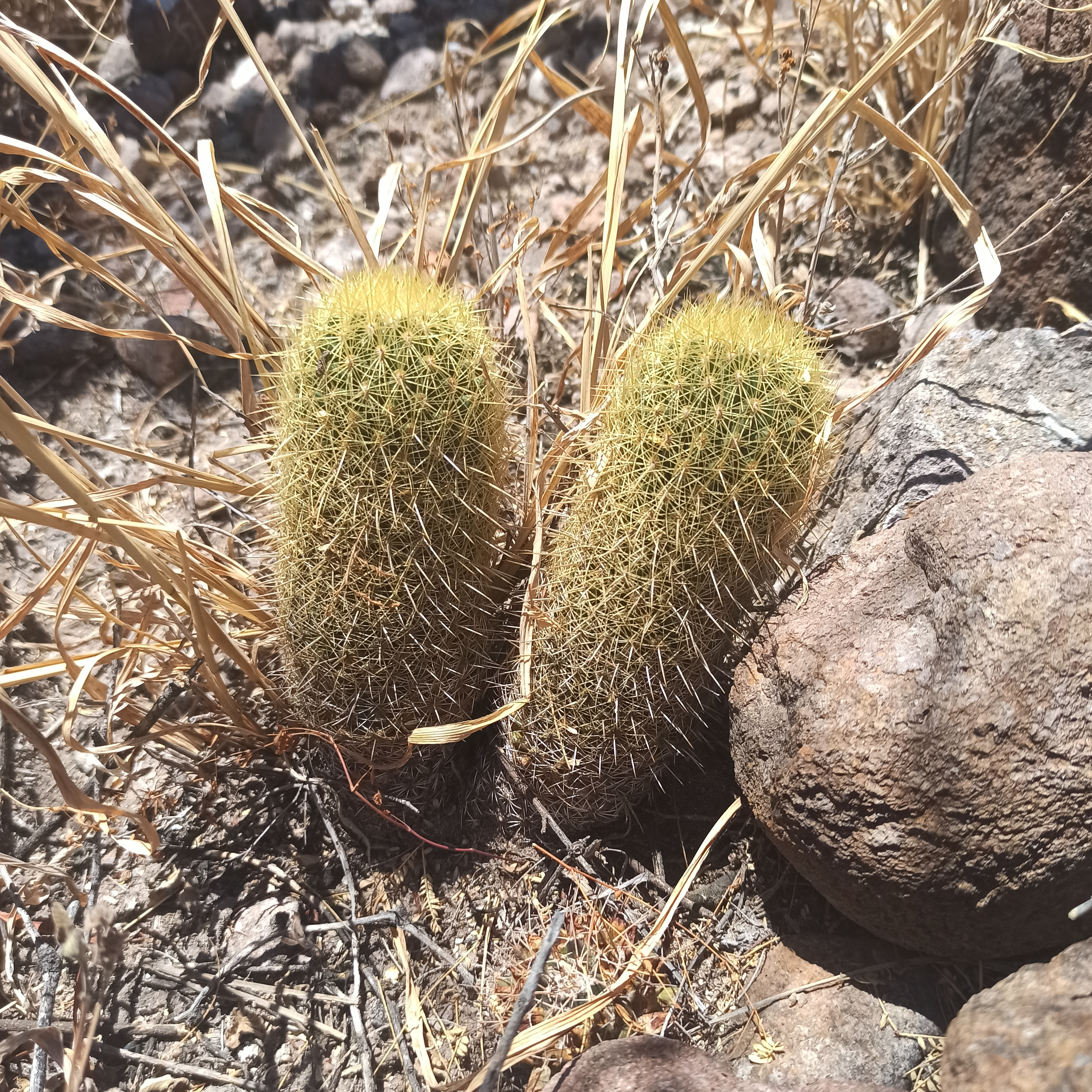
Plants growing in Guanajuato

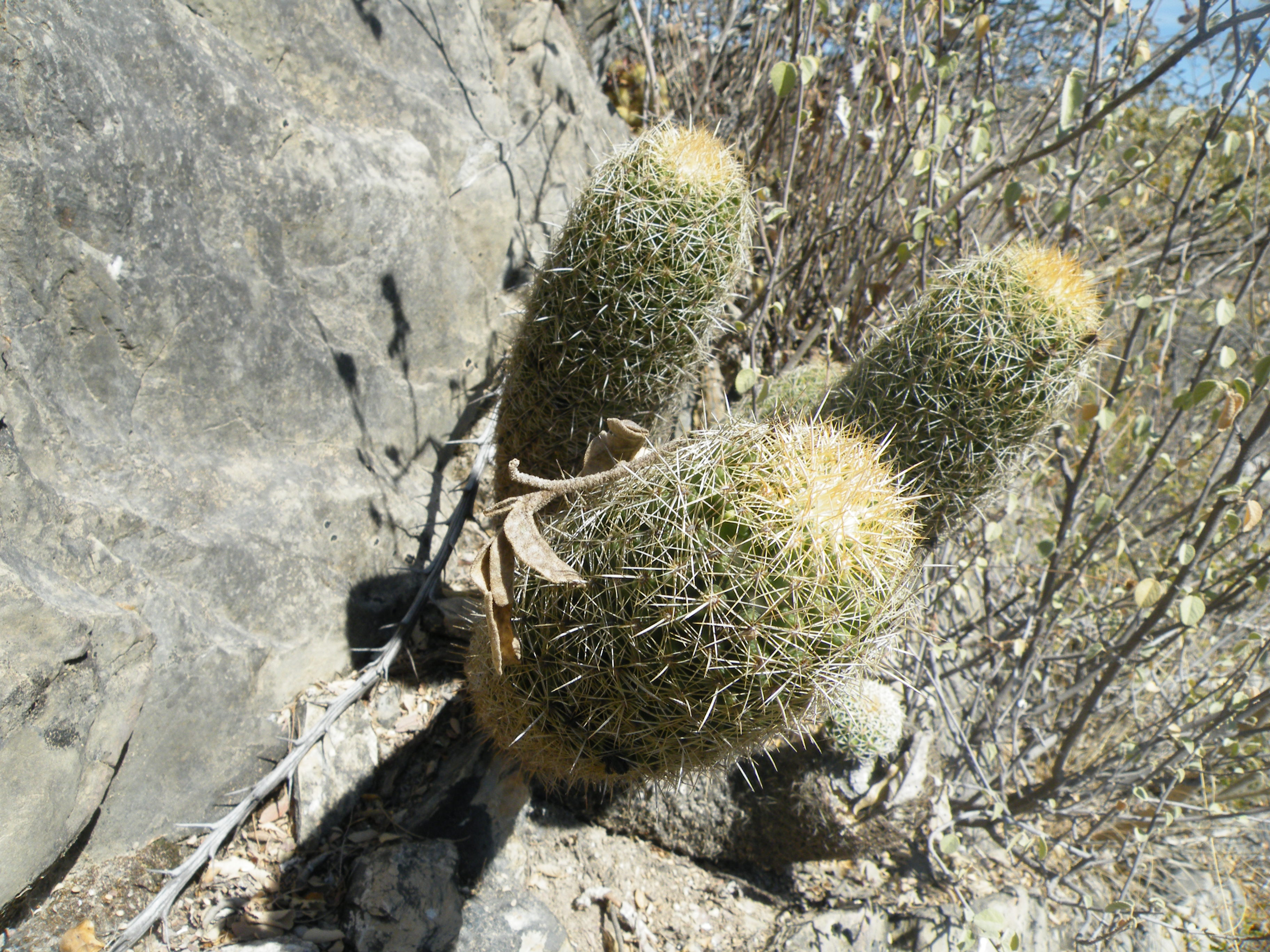
Plants growing in Guanajuato

== Taxonomy ==
The first description as Mammillaria erecta by Ludwig Georg Karl Pfeiffer was published in 1837. The specific epithet erecta comes from Latin, means 'upright' and refers to the upright shoots of the plant. Charles Lemaire placed the species in the genus Coryphantha in 1868. Further nomenclature synonyms are Cactus erectus (Lem. ex Pfeiff.) Kuntze (1891) and Glandulifera erecta (Lem. ex Pfeiff.) Frič (1924).
