= Santa Ana National Wildlife Refuge =

National Wildlife Refuge in Hidalgo County, Texas

- IUCN category IV (habitat/species management area)
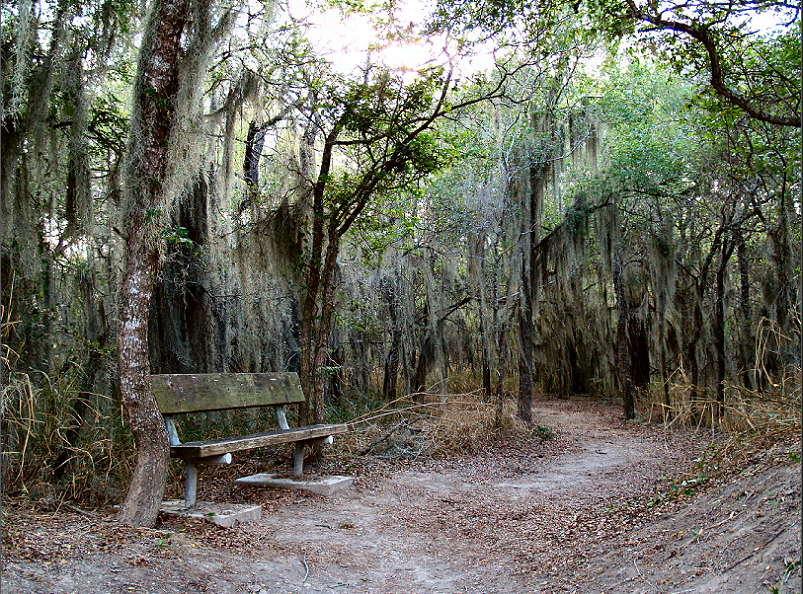
- A bench on the Pintail Lakes Trail

- Location within Texas
- Location: Hidalgo County, Texas, United States
- Nearest city: Alamo, Texas
- Coordinates: 26°4′59″N 98°8′6″W
- Area: 2,088 acres (845 ha)
- Established: 1943
- Governing body: U.S. Fish and Wildlife Service
- Website: Santa Ana National Wildlife Service

U.S. National Natural Landmark
- Designated: 1966

Santa Ana National Wildlife Refuge is a 2,088-acre (8.45 km^{2}) National Wildlife Refuge situated along the banks of the Rio Grande, south of Alamo in the Lower Rio Grande Valley, in Hidalgo County, Texas. This sub-tropical sanctuary harbors one of the highest wildlife diversities of any single unit in the National Wildlife Refuge system and has been referred to as the “Gem of the National Wildlife Refuge System”. Many Mexican and tropical species reach the northern limit of their distributions in the Lower Rio Grande Valley, including several that occur nowhere else in the US. Santa Ana National Wildlife Refuge preserves one of the largest tracks of old growth habitat in the Lower Rio Grande, in a region where much of the land use has been dominated by, and shifted over the last century, from small farms, to commercial agro-industries, to significant population growth and urban development in recent decades.

The wildlife refuge was established in 1943 to protect one of the last remnants of subtropical Rio Grande riparian forest and migratory birds. In a unique location in the US, where diverse climates and habitats of south Texas merge (tropical, temperate, thorn forest, wetlands, Gulf Coastal grasslands), it has a reputation for diverse birding. In addition to birding, the refuge offers opportunities for nature photography, hiking (with over 12 miles of trails), and biking (on paved roads only) and nature tram rides (seasonal), with an observation tower, a canopy bridge, as well as a visitors’ center with nature and wildlife exhibits, an auditorium, nature shop, and restrooms.

The refuge is located within the Tamaulipan Biotic Province (Tamaulipan mezquital), a xeric region with thorn scrub vegetation. However, contrasting with much of the semi-arid ecosystems of the region, the refuge is situated in the riparian zone of the Rio Grande protecting resacas (sloughs and oxbow lakes formed by old channels of the river), mudflats, bottomland forest, riparian terraces, and some areas of upland thorn forest. The topography is relatively flat, with small hills and terraces descending to the river. Elevations in the refuge range from 22 to 34 meters. The refuge is largely bordered by agriculture and croplands to the north, east, and west, and the Rio Grande forms the southern boundary. The geology of the area consists of a Cretaceous base, covered by Cenozoic sedimentary marine depositions of limestone, sandstone, siltstone, claystone, topped with deep Quaternary alluvial soils of sand, clay, and loam.

Due to its location near the Mexico–United States border, the refuge was at risk of environmental damage during the construction of the Mexico–United States border wall. The administration exempted the construction in the refuge, but built on the border of it, leading to possible interference due to noise.

== History ==
Archeological records show that various groups of nomadic Native Americans, collectively referred to as the Coahuiltecans by anthropologists, roamed the Lower Rio Grande Valley for at least 11,000 years. After the Spanish made concerted efforts to colonize the Lower Rio Grande Valley (1747-1755), epidemics such as smallpox, conflicts with the Spanish, Apache, and other indigenous groups, high infant mortalities, and assimilation the Coahuiltecans as a discrete cultural entity had all but vanished in less than a century. Following Mexico’s independence from Spain in 1821, land grants were given to stimulate development in the region, and after the Republic of Texas declared independence in 1836, to bolster Mexico’s claim within the disputed boundary lines as well.

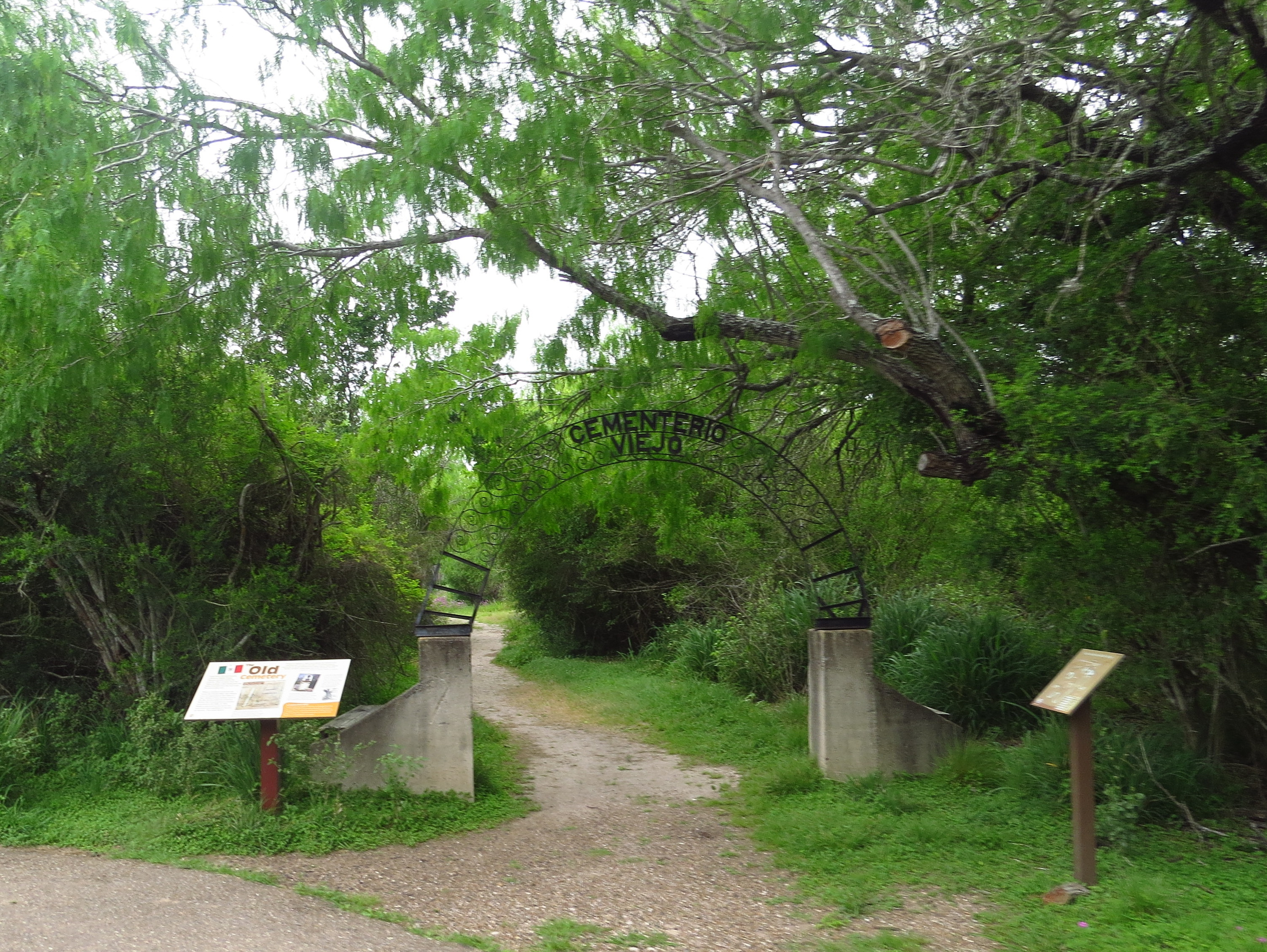
The Cementerio Viejo (Old Cemetery) on refuge grounds predates the Treaty of Guadalupe-Hidalgo

The majority of land now occupied by Santa Ana National Wildlife Refuge was part of the Santa Ana land grant, two square leagues (15,255 acers) awarded to Benigno Leal by the state of Tamaulipas, Mexico on May 19, 1834, when Texas was still Mexican territory. Leal established the Rancho del Adentro (Inside Ranch), constructed a house and ranch headquarters, and started a cemetery on the property. Although the house and any remnants of the ranch are no longer evident, the Santa Ana Cemetery, or Cementerio Viejo (Old Cemetery), is still there today. It includes a tomb constructed of handmade bricks and about 30 graves dating from the 19th and early 20th centuries. Portions of the cemetery’s fence erected ca. 1875 and made of hand cut Texas ebony still stand. The cemetery is maintained by the refuge and open to visitors.

Among those interred in the Cemetery are members of the Leal family and others from the ranch and neighboring area. Based on family accounts, Benigno Leal was killed by Indians in retribution for an Indian Leal had killed trespassing on his property. Factions of the Lipan Apache had been pushed south into the region after their conflicts with the Comanches in the 1720s, and fights with the Apache and raiding Comanche in the Lower Rio Grande Valley were known to occur in the mid-19th century. The boveda (above-ground vault), or tomb, once held the remains of Cristobal Leal (1833–1876) and wife his María Rafaela Treviño. Cristobal was the son of Benigno Leal and his wife Victoria Balli, who they adopted in 1859. Sometime during the Mexican Revolution (1910–1920), about 1915–16, the tomb was violated and looted, and the bones were dispersed by bandits making border rides. It was restored after the refuge was established.

Following disputes over the international boundary between Mexico and the Republic of Texas (1836–1846), the annexation of Texas by the United States (1845), the Mexican–American War (1846–1848), and the Treaty of Guadalupe Hidalgo (1848) establishing the Rio Grande as the international border, Cristobal and his wife Victoria Balli Leal began selling their property north of the river in parcels. Dr. Eli T. Merriman, a Mexican-American war veteran, Union surgeon, and one of the first commissioners of Hidalgo County, acquired the east league (4,428 acres) in 1852 for ranching. In 1853, Thomas Walter Jones of Washington DC was buried on Merriman’s ranch after he drowned in the Rio Grande in the vicinity of the ranch while conducting surveys with United States and Mexican Boundary Survey (1848–1855). Dr. W. T.G. Brewster, also a Union surgeon during the American Civil War, acquired the east league from Dr. Merriman in 1878. And finally Peter Ebenezer Blalock, a co-developer of Alamo, was the owner of all the land in the original Santa Ana Grant by 1902. Concerns over the rapidly vanishing natural habitat in the valley due to agriculture began as early as the 1930s. Organizations such as the Rio Grande Valley Nature Club and individuals like Irby (author of A Field guide to Birds of Mexico and Central America) and Anna May Davis petitioned the U.S. Biological Survey to preserve some of the last remaining riparian forest. The land for the refuge was purchased by the federal government in 1943 for $22,414.

== Flora ==
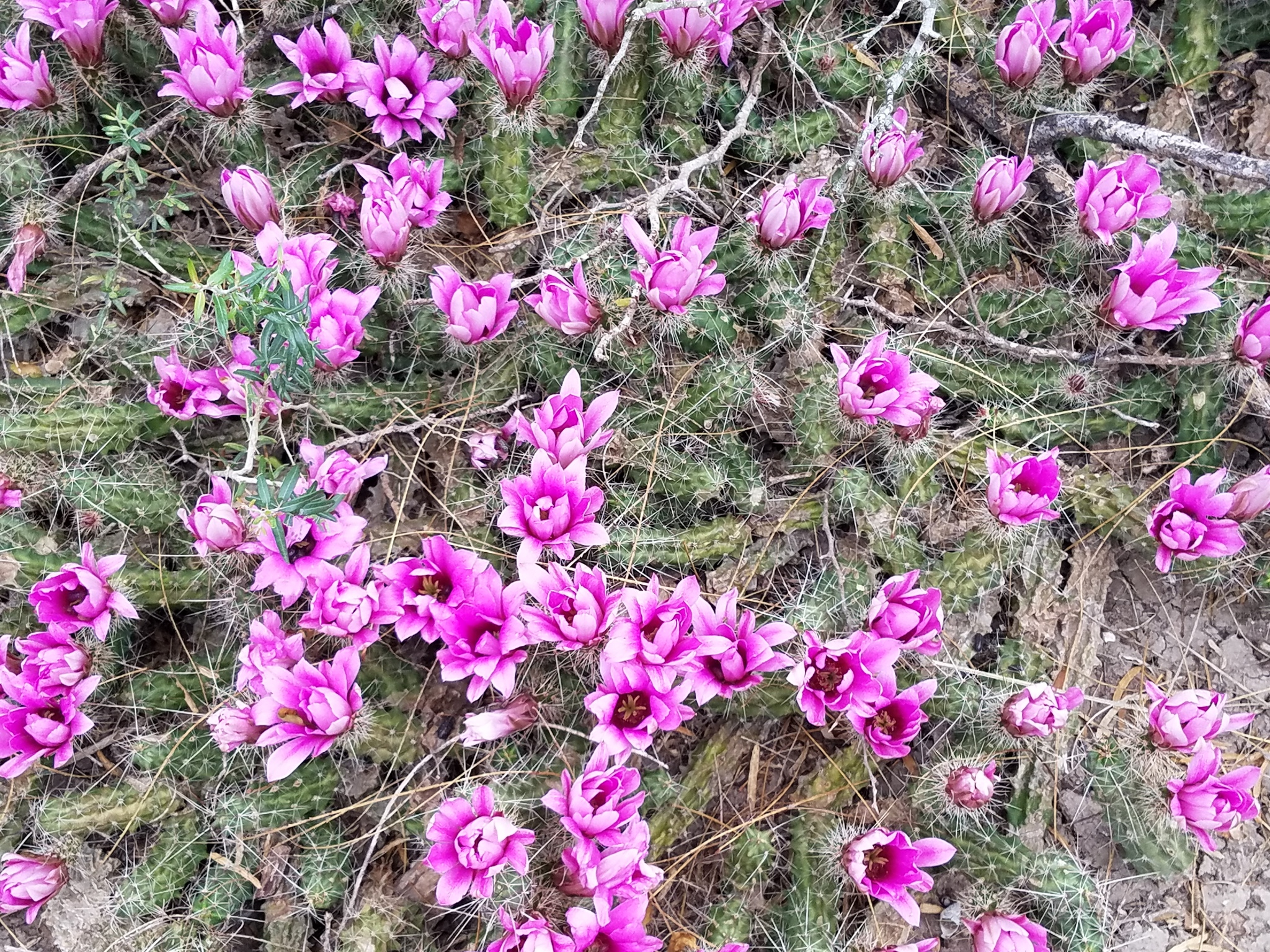
Berlandier’s hedgehog cactus (Echinocereus berlandieri), Hidalgo Co. Texas

In the Lower Rio Grande Valley, 99% of the riparian vegetation adjacent to the Rio Grande has been eliminated. Among seven study sites in the region retaining natural vegetation, species richness was greatest at the Sabal Palm Sanctuary and Santa Ana National Wildlife Refuge. At Santa Ana, the dominant tree species in the canopy layer were Cedar Elm (Ulmus crassifolia) and Anacua (Ehretia anacua). Other relatively importance species occurring in the tree layer included Sugar Hackberry (Celtis laevigata), Texas Persimmon (Diospyros texana), Narrowleaf Willow (Salix exigua), Desert Hackberry (Celtis ehrenbergiana), False Willow (Baccharis neglecta), Correhuela vine (Nephroia diversifolia), Spanish Moss (Tillandsia usneoides), Saffron Plum (Sideroxylon celastrinum). The dominant shrubs in the mid layer were Desert Hackberry (Celtis ehrenbergiana) and Lime Prickly Ash (Zanthoxylum fagara). In the ground cover, dominants species were fragrant mistflower (Chromolaena odorata), correhuela vine (Nephroia diversifolia) and the invasive Guinea grass (Megathyrsus maximus) which is displacing native species in the region.

=== Cacti ===
South Texas has a wealth of cactus species, several of which are predominantly Mexican species that grow nowhere else in the US. Species recorded in Hidalgo County include the night blooming tringle cactus (Acanthocereus tetragonus) and Schott’s dog cholla (Grusonia schotti), christmas cholla (Cylindropuntia leptocaulis), Texas prickly pear (Opuntia engelmannii var. lindheimeri), lady finger cactus (Echinocereus pentalophus), Berlandier’s hedgehog cactus (Echinocereus berlandieri), dahlia cactus (Echinocereus poselgeri), strawberry pitaya (Echinocereus enneacanthus var. brevispinus), junior Tom Thumb cactus (Pelecyphora emskoetteriana), root cactus (Sclerocactus scheeri), twisted rib cactus (Thelocactus setispinus), horse-crippler cactus (Homalocephala texensis), Lower Rio Grande Valley barrel cactus (Ferocactus hamatacanthus var. sinuatus), Heyder’s pincushion cactus (Mammillaria heyderi var. heyderi), hair-covered cactus (Mammillaria prolifera var. texana), pale mammillaria (Mammillaria sphaerica).

Trees draped with Spanish moss, Santa Ana NWR

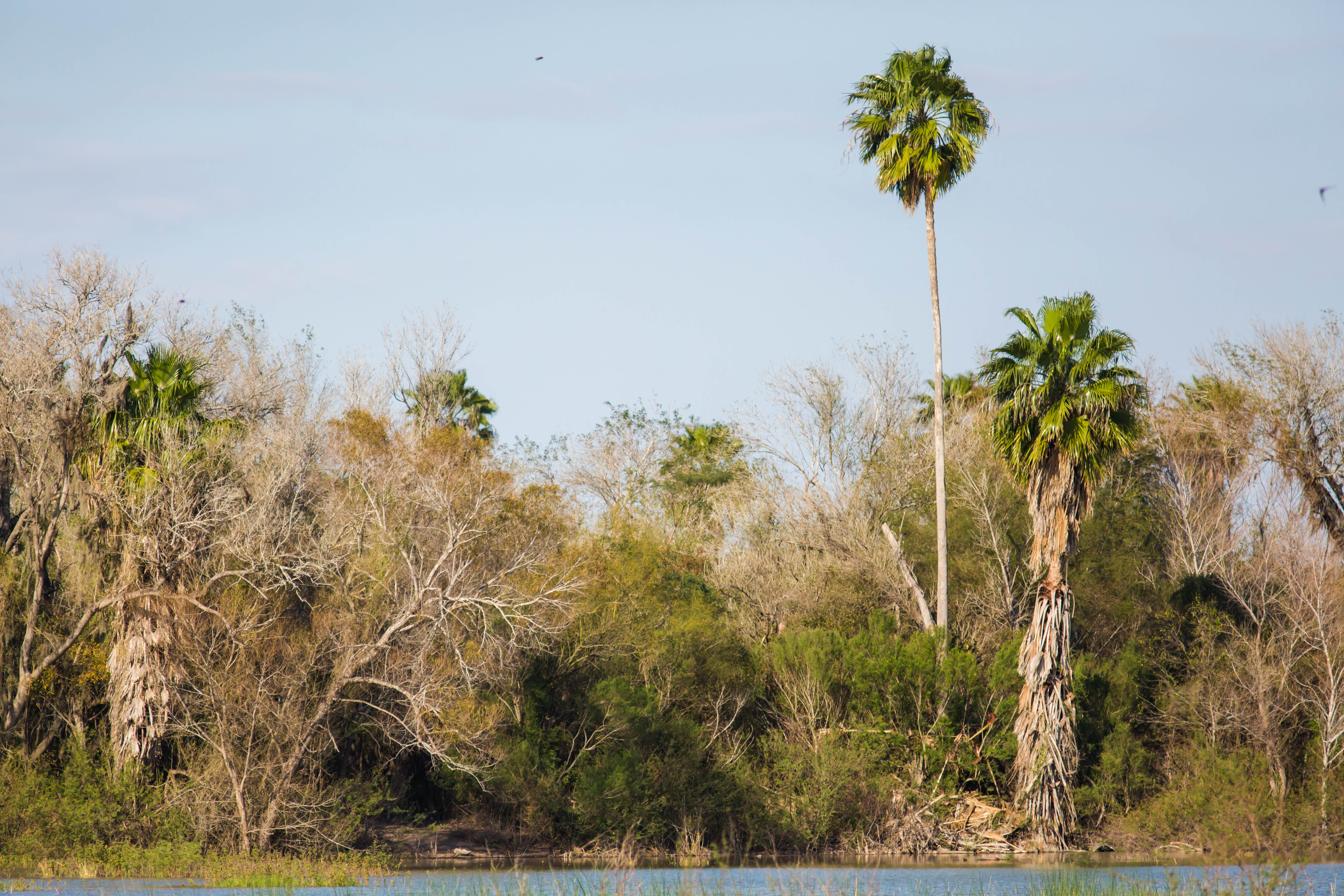
Wetlands with Texas sabal palms (Sabal mexicana), Santa Ana National Wildlife Refuge

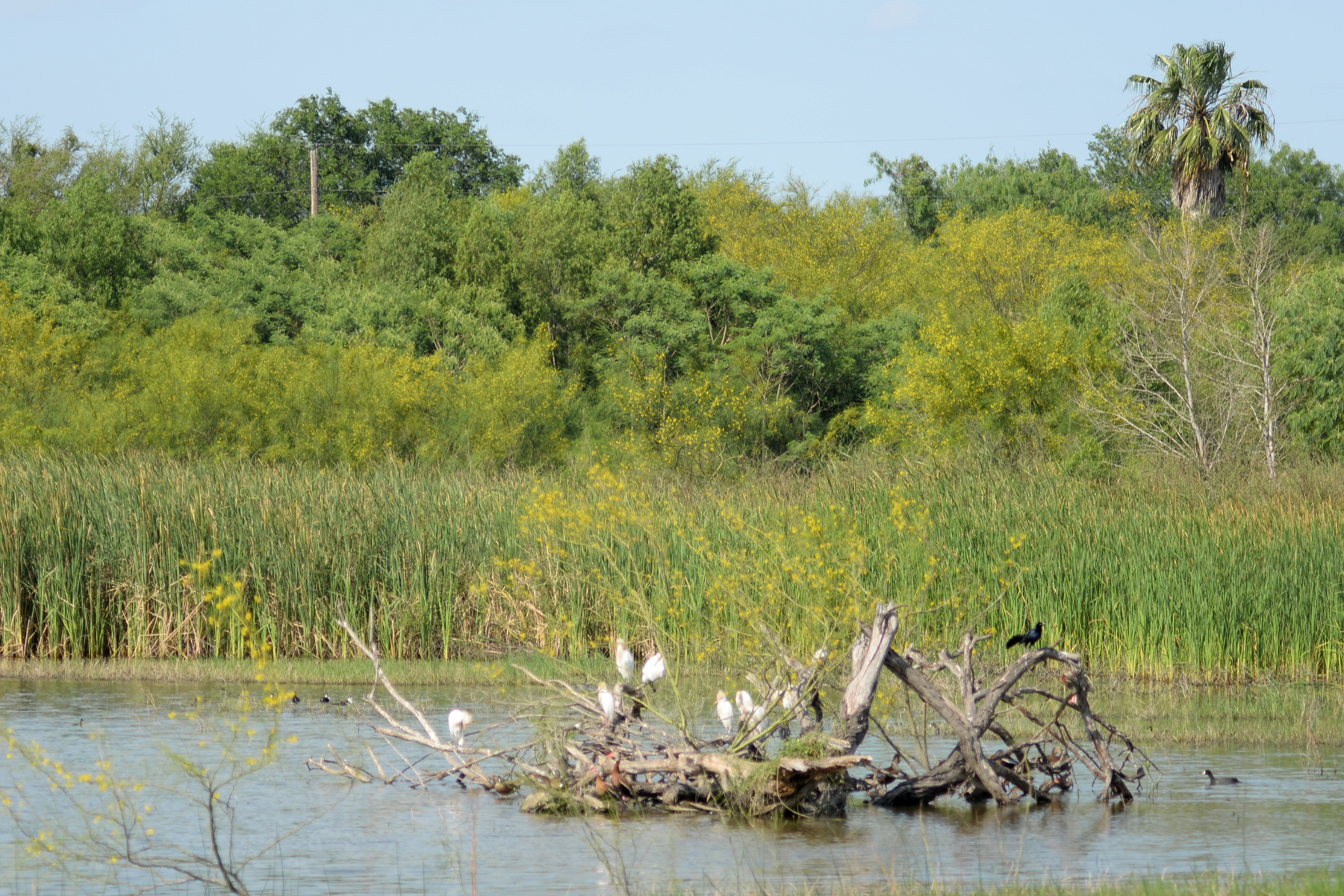
Willow Lake with birds (left to right black-necked stilts, cattle egrets, black-bellied whistling-ducks, a grackle, and coot)

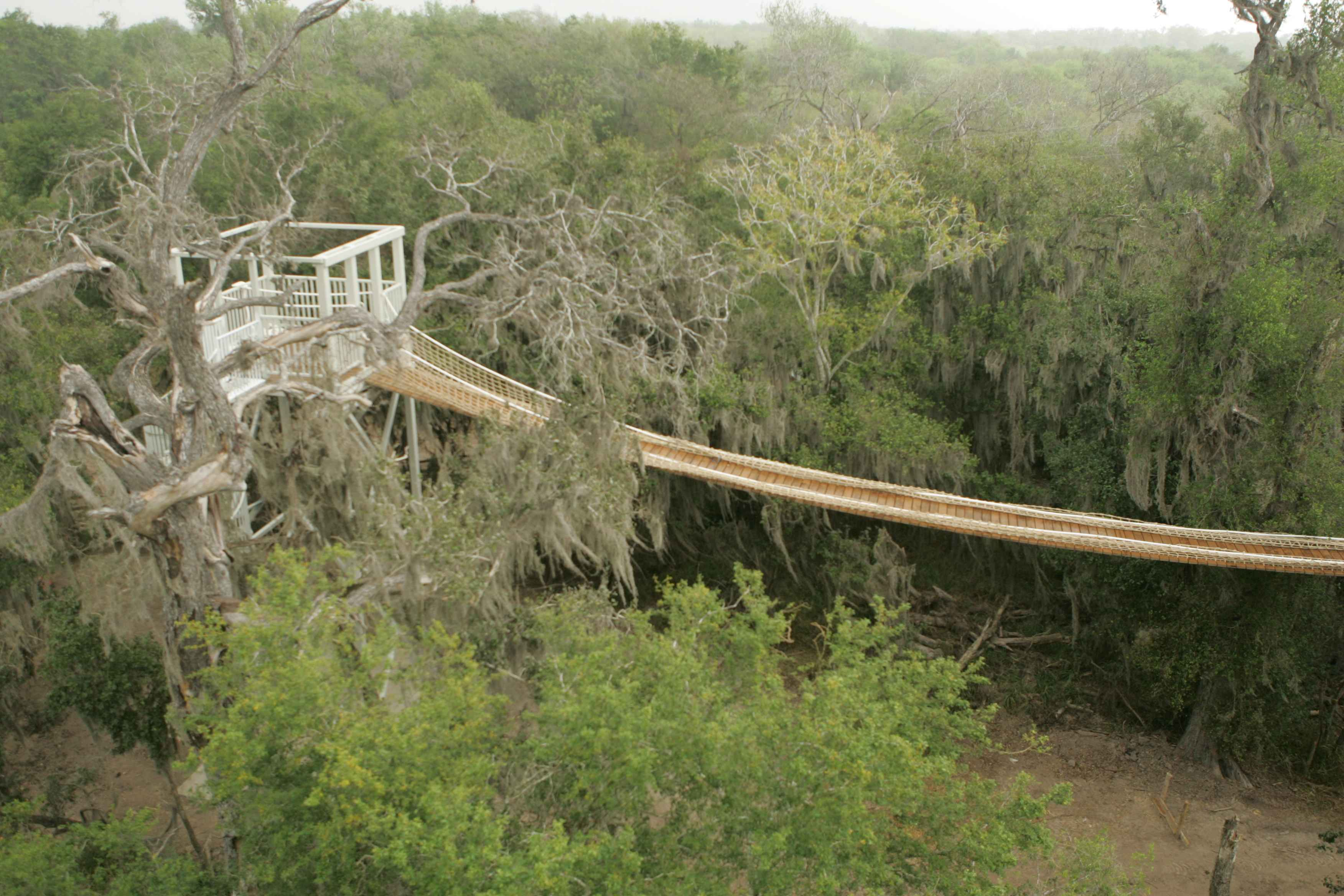
An elevated walk in the canopy at Santa Ana National Wildlife Refuge

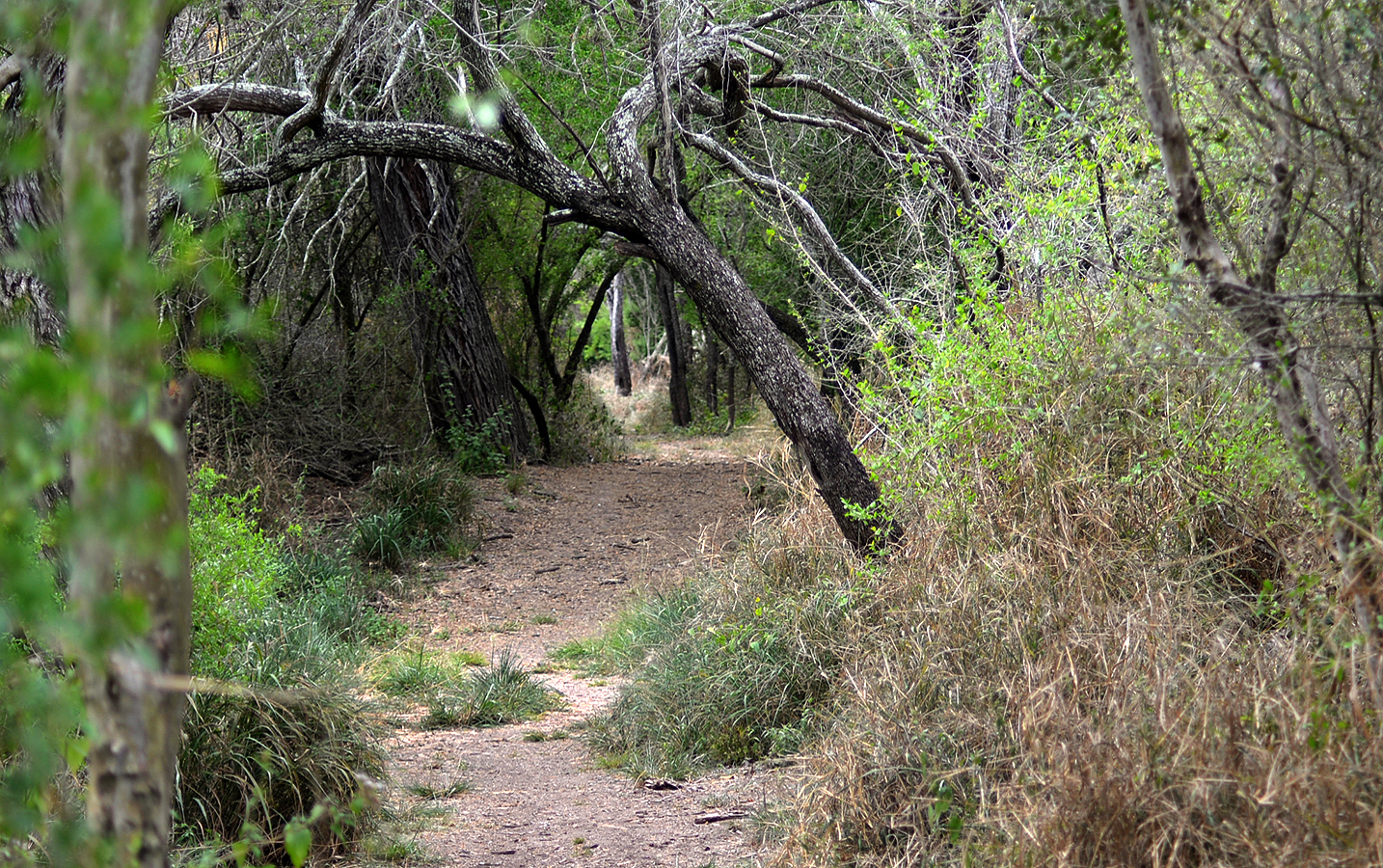
A trail through mature thornscrub forest in Santa Ana NWR

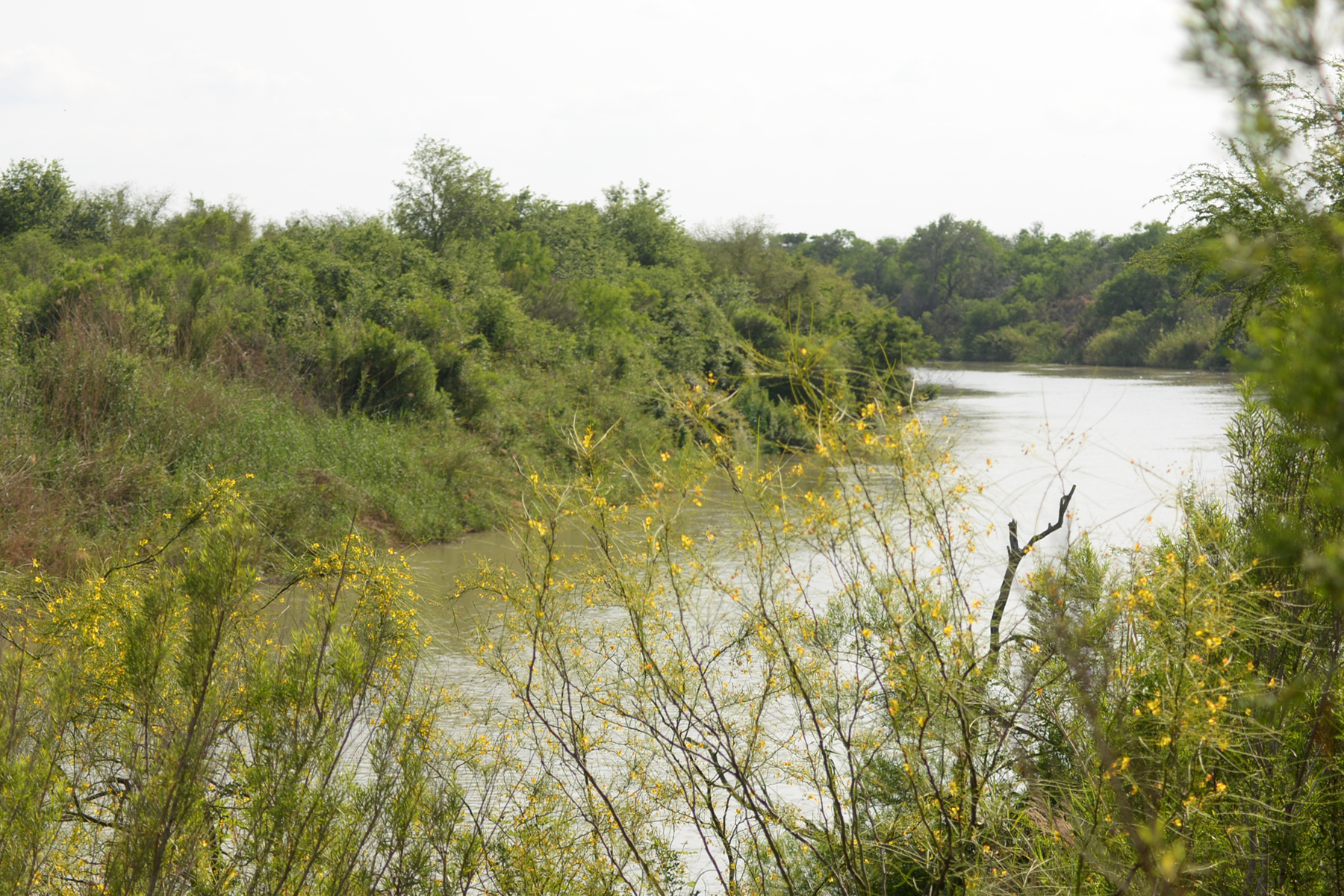
The Rio Grande with flowering palo verde seen from the Refuge (Mexico left, USA right)

== Fauna ==
State of Texas: threatened species *, endangered species **

=== Mammals ===
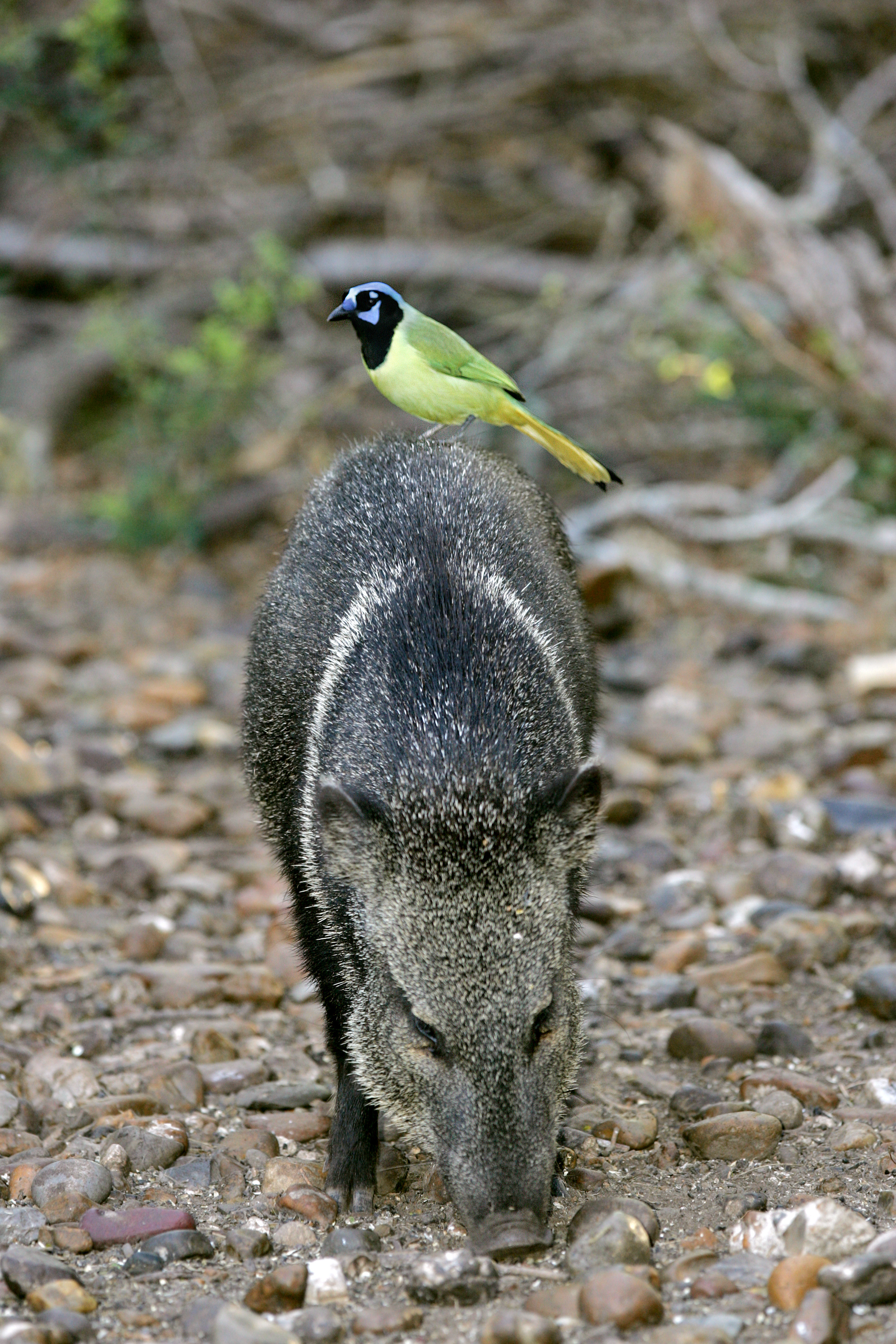
Green Jay on a Javelina or Collared Peccary in south Texas

A few of the mammals known from Hidalgo County include the nine-banded armadillo (Dasypus novemcinctus), Virginia opossum (Didelphis virginiana), raccoon (Procyon lotor), black-tailed jackrabbit (Lepus californicus), Rio Grande ground squirrel (Ictidomys parvidens), northern grasshopper mouse (Onychomys leucogaster), Gulf Coast kangaroo rat (Dipodomys compactus), collared peccary (Dicotyles tajacu), bobcat (Lynx rufus), and coyote (Canis latrans).

Historically, several large carnivores occurred in the region as well, such as jaguars (Panthera onca)**, gray wolves (Canis lupus)**, and American black bears (Ursus americanus)*, all now extirpated. Hidalgo County was one of the last strongholds of jaguarundi (Herpailurus yagouaroundi)** and ocelot (Leopardus pardalis)** populations in Texas. Zoologist David Schmidly wrote in 1994 “The rarest of all native cats, jaguarundi are now thought to be represented in the lower Rio Grande Valley by no more than 15 individuals”, and its survival was described as “doubtful”. As of 2025 its status in the US is somewhat unclear. Some have speculated it has been extirpated, and Texas Parks and Wildlife states Jaguarundis are extinct in Texas. The US Fish & Wildlife Service states the ocelot and jaguarundi are “known to still prowl the deep forest” in Santa Ana National Wildlife Refuge. Small populations of ocelots persist in Laguna Atascosa National Wildlife Refuge and neighboring Texas counties to the east. Although there are several confirmed records of white-nosed coati (Nasua narica)* from the Lower Rio Grande Valley, they are believed to represent wandering, solitary males following riparian corridors from the south (females and young males travel in troops), and released or escaped pets. It is unlikely that south Texas ever supported a breading population, and they are likely extirpated from the region now.

=== Birds ===
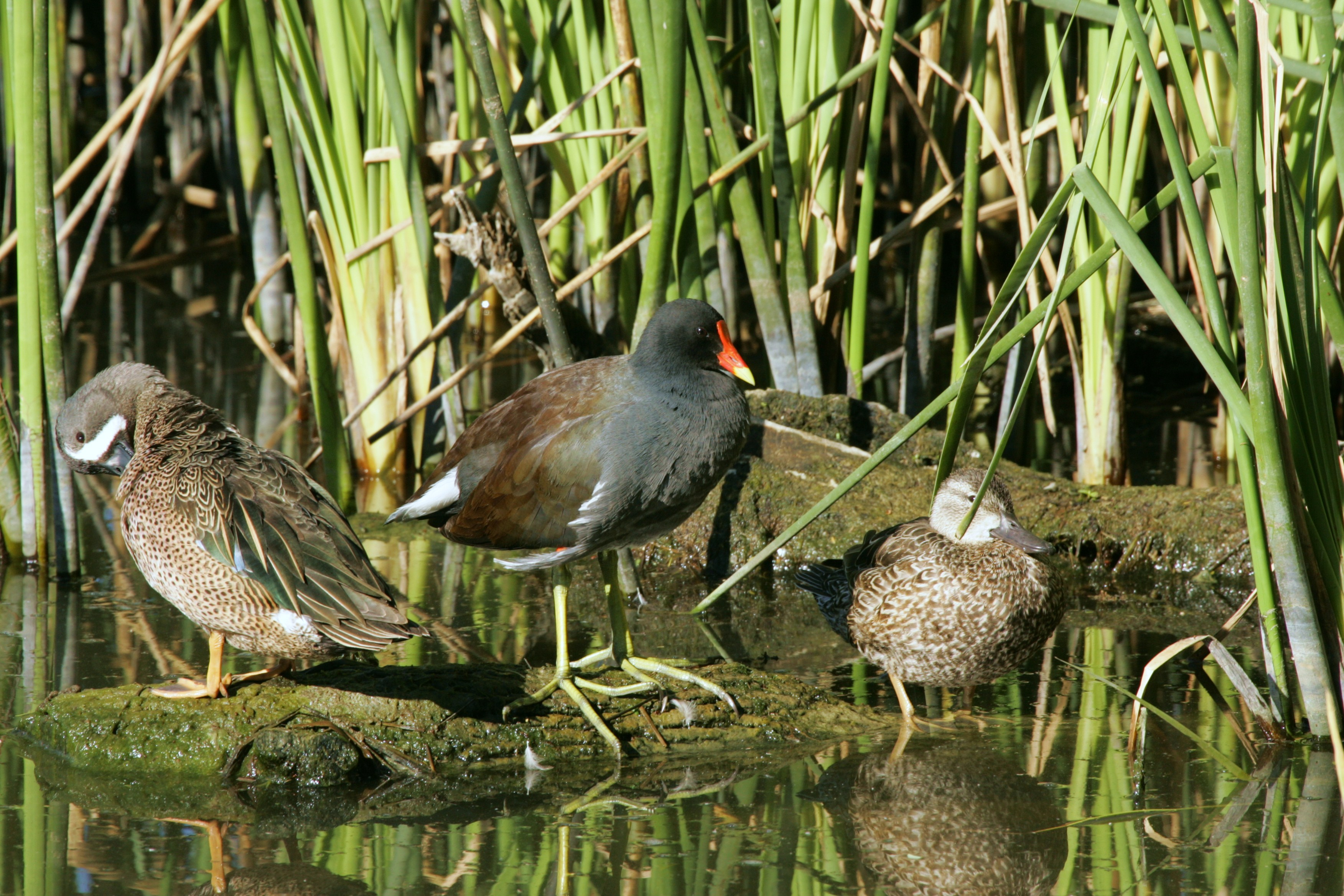
Common Gallinule (center) and Blue-winged Teal (male left, female right), Santa Ana NWR

Documented within the refuge's borders are 397 bird species, many of which are migratory species on their way to and from Central and South America. Some of the waterfowl and waders to be found there are black-bellied whistling-duck (Dendrocygna autumnalis), fulvous whistling-duck (Dendrocygna bicolor), mottled duck (Anas fulvigula), least grebe (Tachybaptus dominicus), anhinga (Anhinga anhinga), tricolored heron (Egretta tricolor), white ibis (Eudocimus albus), wood stork (Mycteria americana)*, and least tern (Sternula antillarum).

Among the birds of prey found in the refuge are Harris' hawk (Parabuteo unicinctus), white-tailed kite (Elanus leucurus), and peregrine falcon (Falco peregrinus)*. Hook-billed kite (Chondrohierax uncinatus) and grey hawk (Buteo plagiatus)* are seen occasionally in the refuge and attract birders from around the world. Other species recorded in the refuge include plain chachalacas (Ortalis vetula), white-tipped dove (Leptotila verreauxi), groove-billed ani (Crotophaga sulcirostris), ferruginous pygmy owl (Glaucidium brasilianum)*, common pauraque (Nyctidromus albicollis), buff-bellied hummingbird (Amazilia yucatanensis), green kingfisher (Chloroceryle americana), ringed kingfisher (Megaceryle torquata), golden-fronted woodpecker (Melanerpes aurifrons).

Passeriformes species include Northern Beardless-Tyrannulet (Camptostoma imberbe)*, Tropical Kingbird (Tyrannus melancholicus), Great Kiskadee (Pitangus sulphuratus), green jay,(Cyanocorax luxuosus), Clay-colored Robin (Turdus grayi), Altamira oriole (Icterus gularis), Hooded oriole (Icterus cucullatus), and Olive sparrow (Arremonops rufivirgatus). More than 35 species of New World warblers have been seen, including the golden-winged warbler (Vermivora chrysoptera), magnolia warbler (Setophaga magnolia), Northern parula (Setophaga americana), tropical parula (Setophaga pitiayumi)*, American redstart (Setophaga ruticilla), palm warbler (Setophaga palmarum), and yellow-breasted chat (Icteria virens).

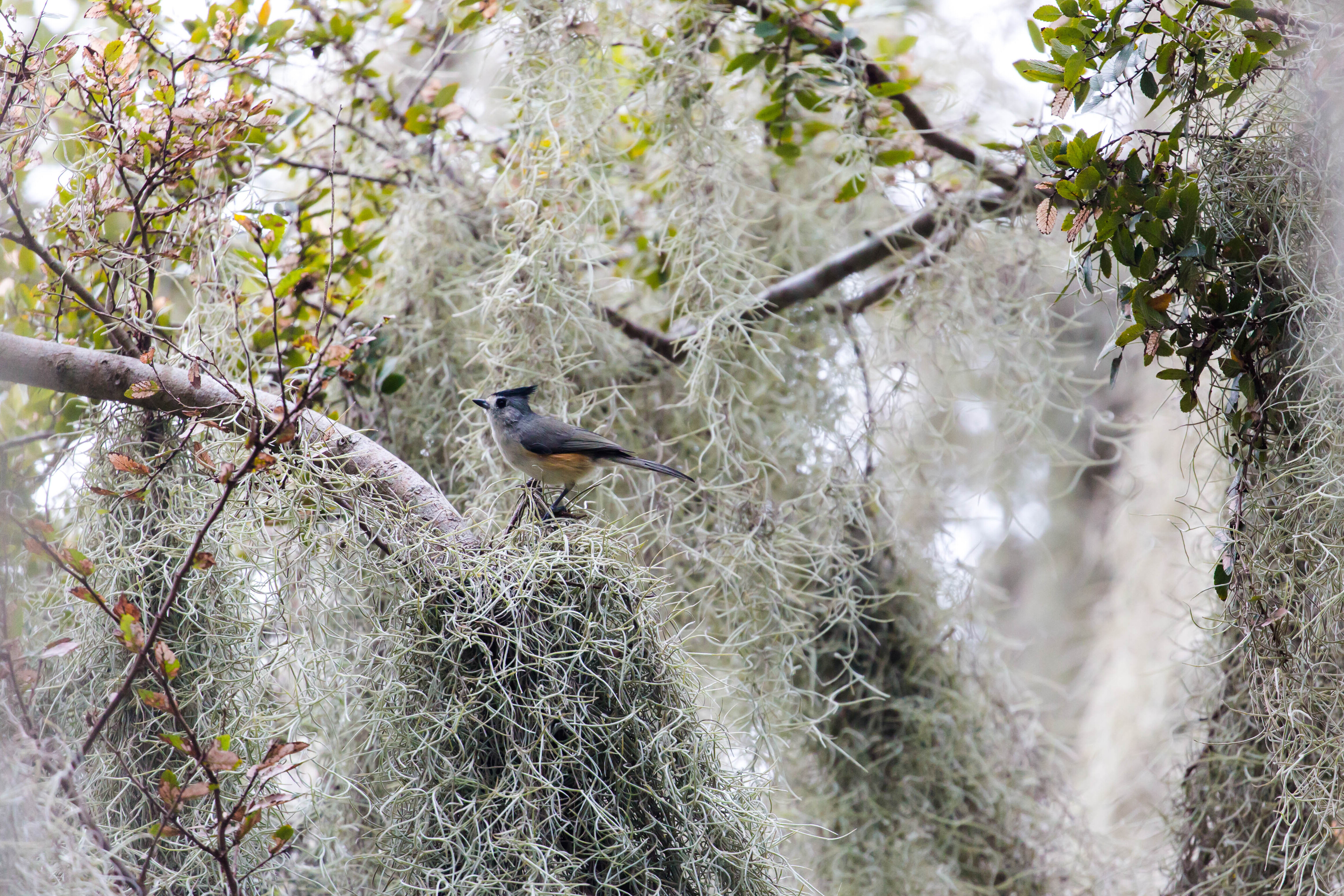
Black-crested titmouse among Sphanish moss, Santa Ana NWR

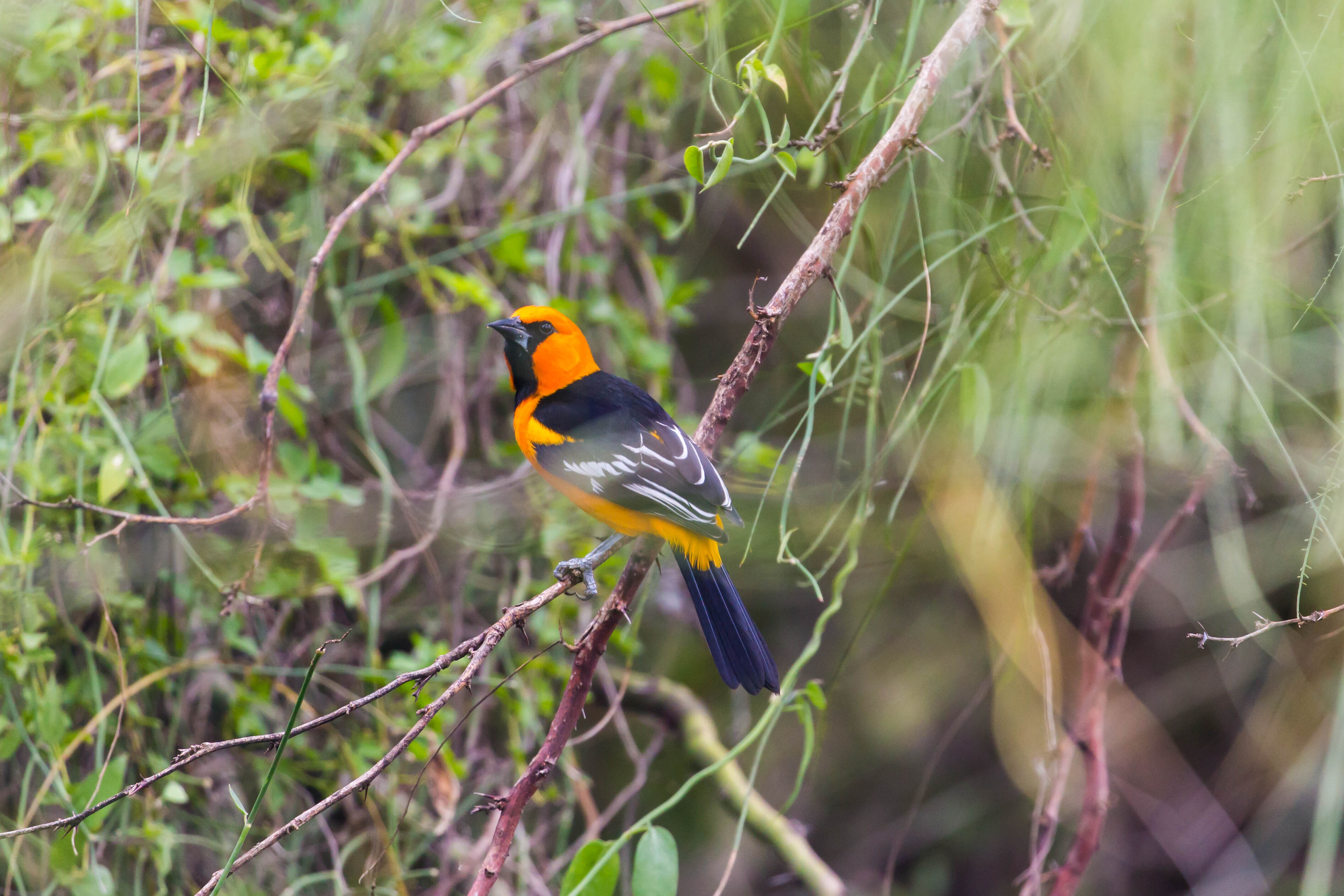
Altamira oriole, Santa Ana NWR

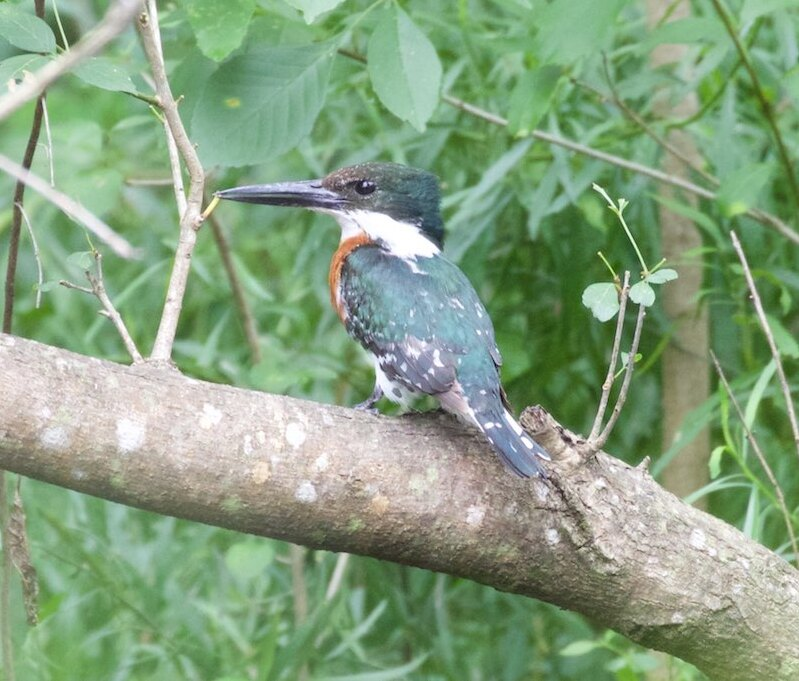
Green Kingfisher, Santa Ana NWR

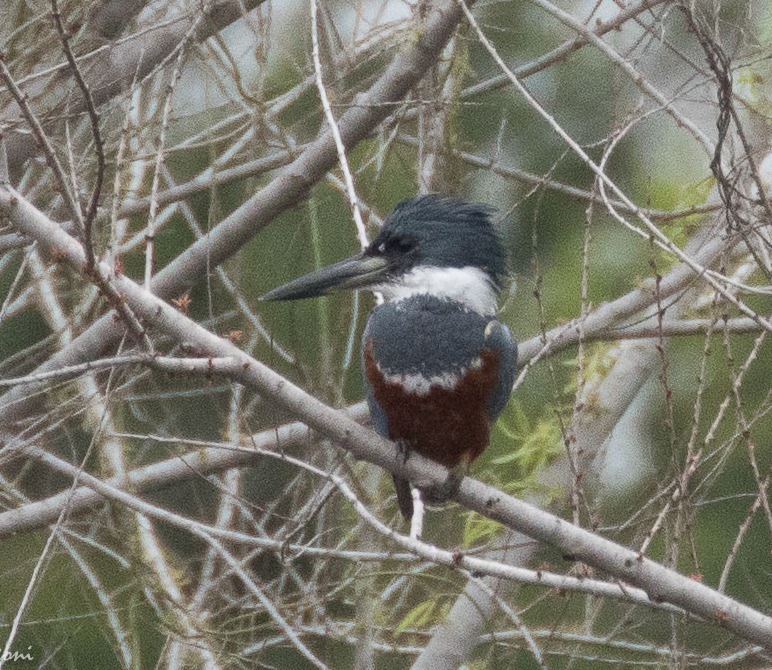
Ringed Kingfisher (female), Santa Ana NWR

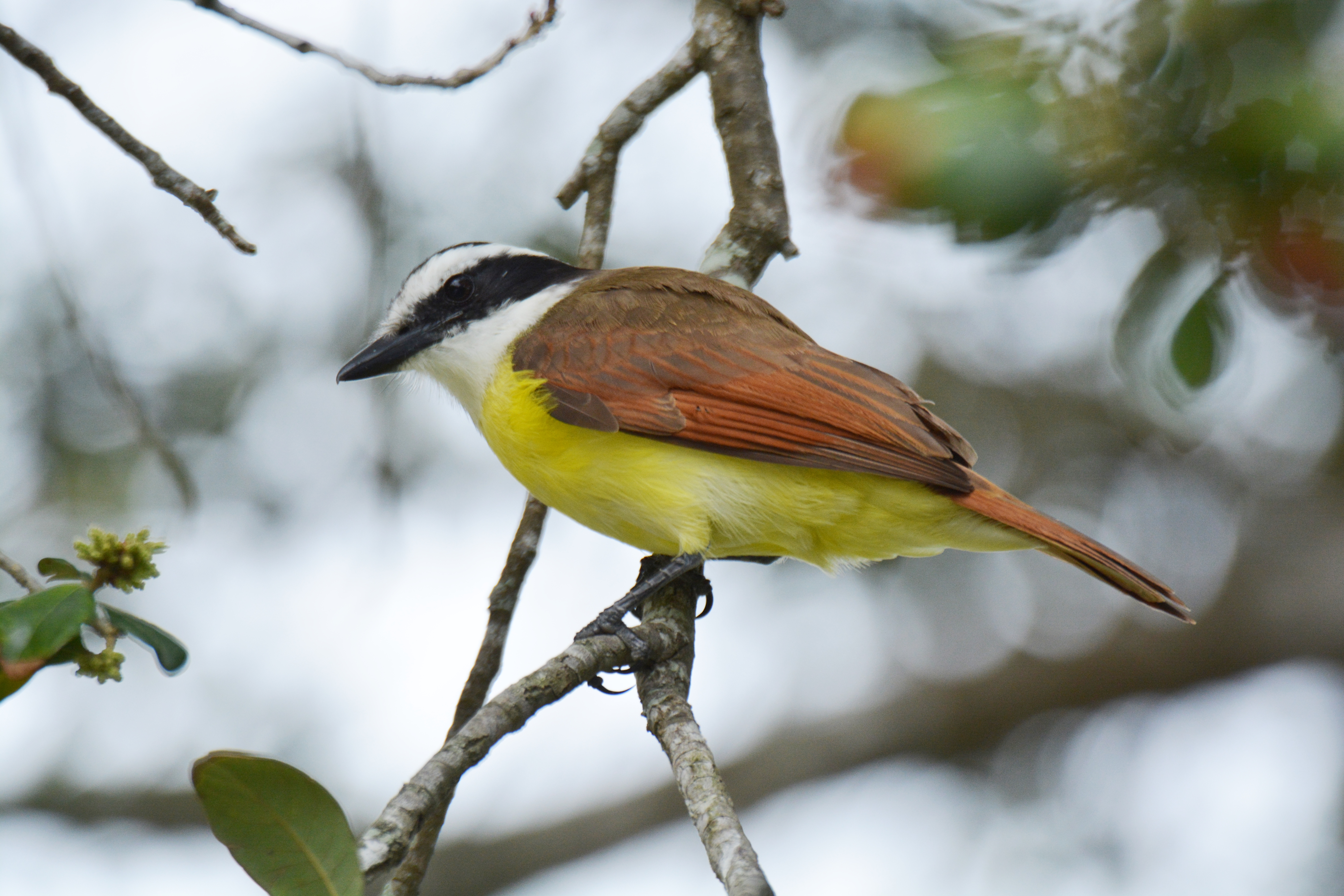
Great Kiskadee, Alamo, Texas

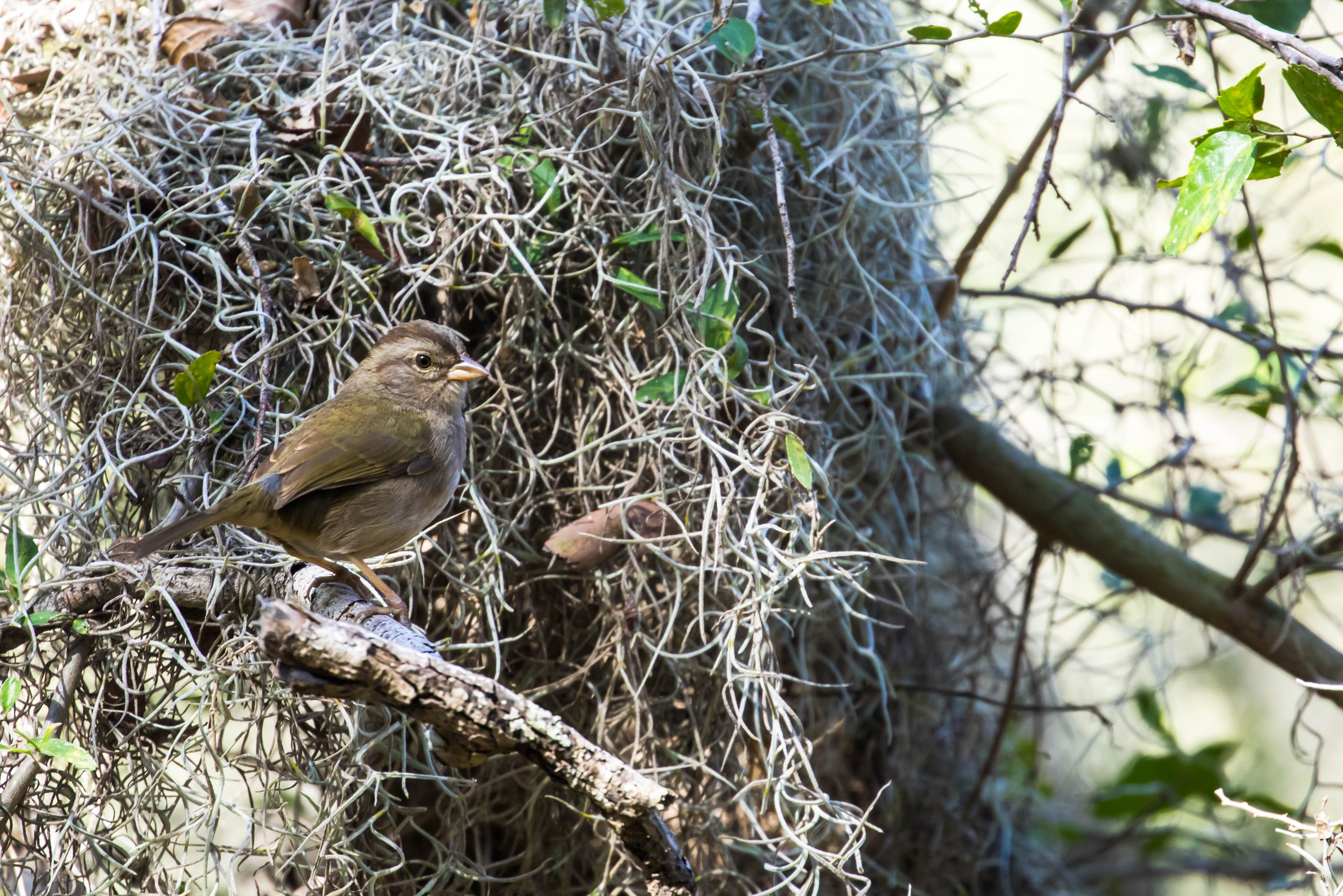
Olive sparrow, Santa Ana NWR

=== Reptiles ===
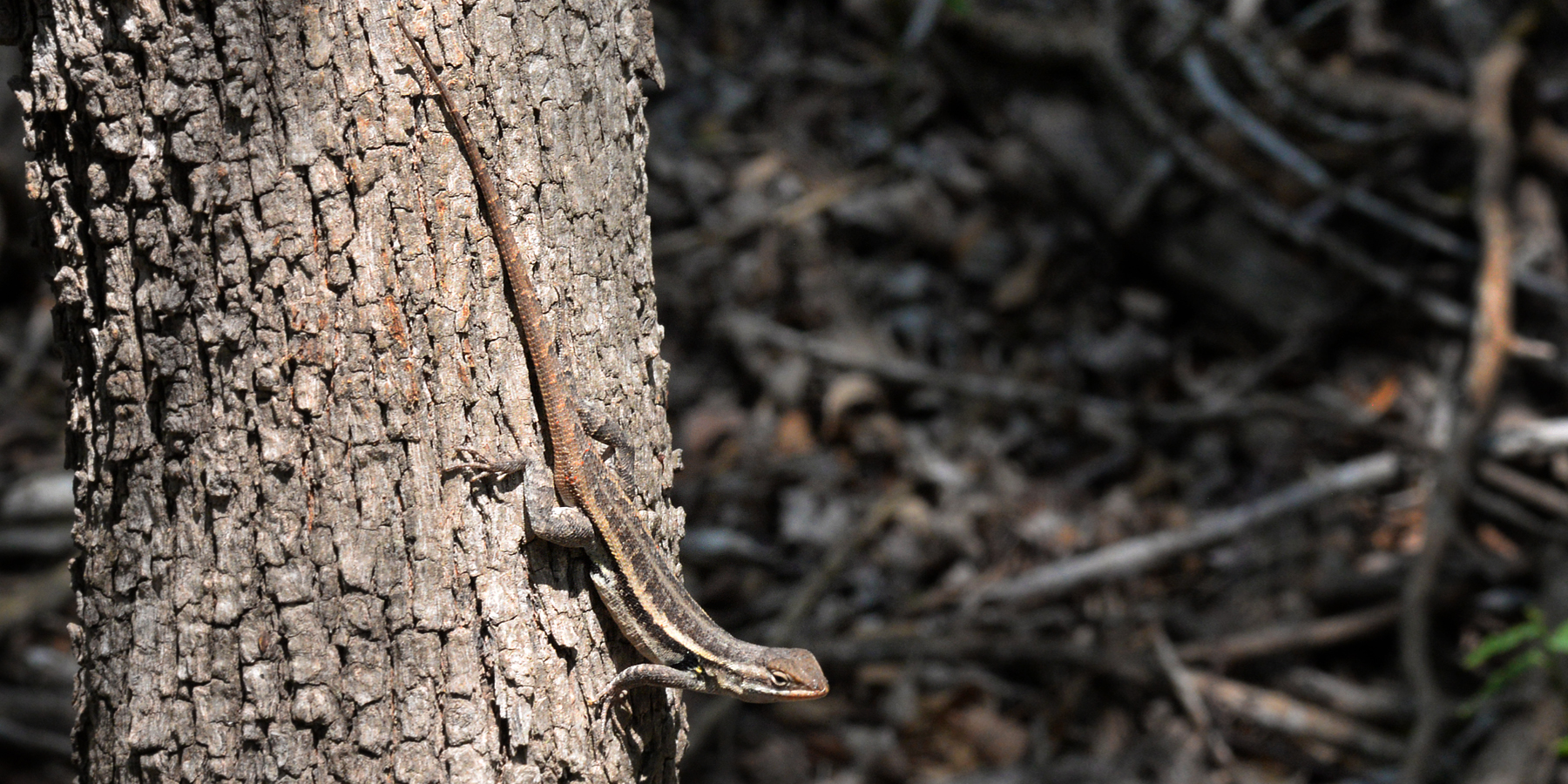
Northern Rose-bellied Lizard (Sceloporus marmoratus), Santa Ana NWR

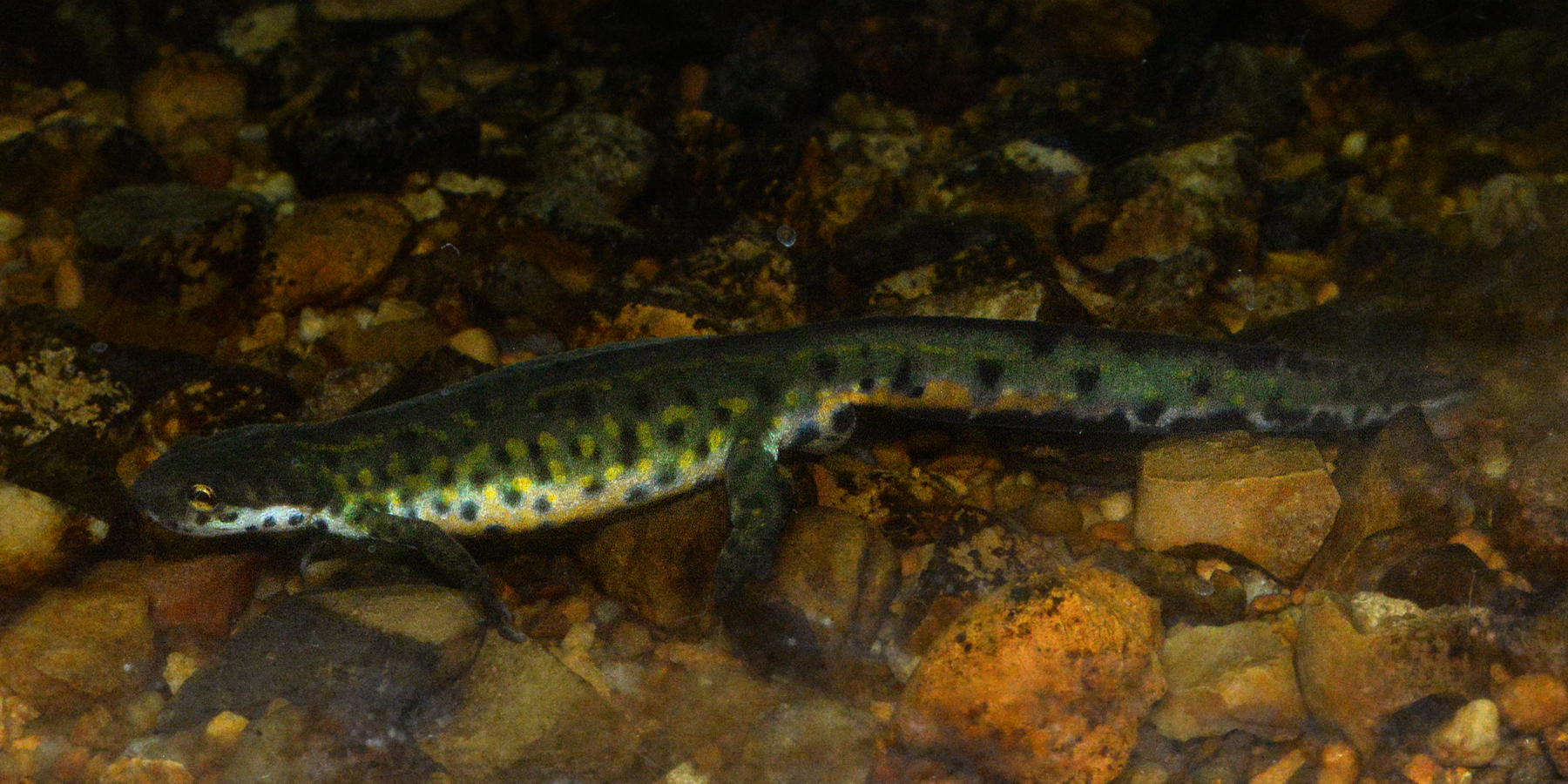
Black-spotted Newt (Notophthalmus meridionalis), Santa Ana NWR

The area is rich in reptile diversity. The Texas tortoise (Gopherus berlandieri)* is well adapted to the semiarid environment of the region, while the distribution of the Rio Grande cooter (Pseudemys gorzugi) is restricted to the Rio Grande and some of its tributaries. Some of the lizards documented from Hidalgo County include the reticulate collared lizard (Crotaphytus reticulatus), Texas banded gecko (Coleonyx brevis), blue spiny lizard (Sceloporus cyanogenys), graphic spiny lizard (Sceloporus grammicus), northern rosebelly lizard (Sceloporus marmoratus), ornate tree lizard (Urosaurus ornatus), four-lined skink (Plestiodon tetragrammus), and the parthenogenic Laredo striped whiptail (Aspidoscelis laredoensis).

Venomous snakes include the western diamond-back rattlesnake (Crotalus atrox), the Texas coralsnake (Micrurus tener), and the rare desert massasauga (Sistrurus tergeminus edwardsii). A few other species recorded from Hidalgo County are the glossy snake (Arizona elegans), regal black-striped snake (Coniophanes imperialis)*, Central American indigo snake (Drymarchon melanurus), speckled racer (Drymobius margaritiferus)*, Tamaulipan hook-nose snake (Ficimia streckeri), Mexican hog-nose snake (Heterodon kennerlyi), Chihuahuan nightsnake (Hypsiglena jani), Mexican milksnake (Lampropeltis annulata), northern cat-eyed snake (Leptodeira septentrionalis)*, Schott’s whipsnake (Masticophis schotti), gopher snake (Pituophis catenifer), long-nose snake (Rhinocheilus lecontei), and the eastern patch-nose snake (Salvadora grahamiae) among several others.

=== Amphibians ===
Salamanders recorded in Hidalgo County include the western lesser siren (Siren nettingi) and the black-spotted newt (Notophthalmus meridionalis)*. Although the cane toad (Rhinella marina) is an invasive species in many regions around the world, it is native to South Texas, as are other tropical species recorded in Hidalgo County, such as the white-lipped frog (Leptodactylus fragilis)*, Rio Grande chirping frog (Eleutherodactylus cystignathoides), Mexican treefrog (Smilisca baudinii)*, and the sheep frog (Hypopachus variolosus)*.

=== Butterflies ===
Santa Ana is home to almost half of all butterfly species found in the United States. More than 300 species of butterflies have been observed at the refuge, with as many as 65 having been seen on a single day.

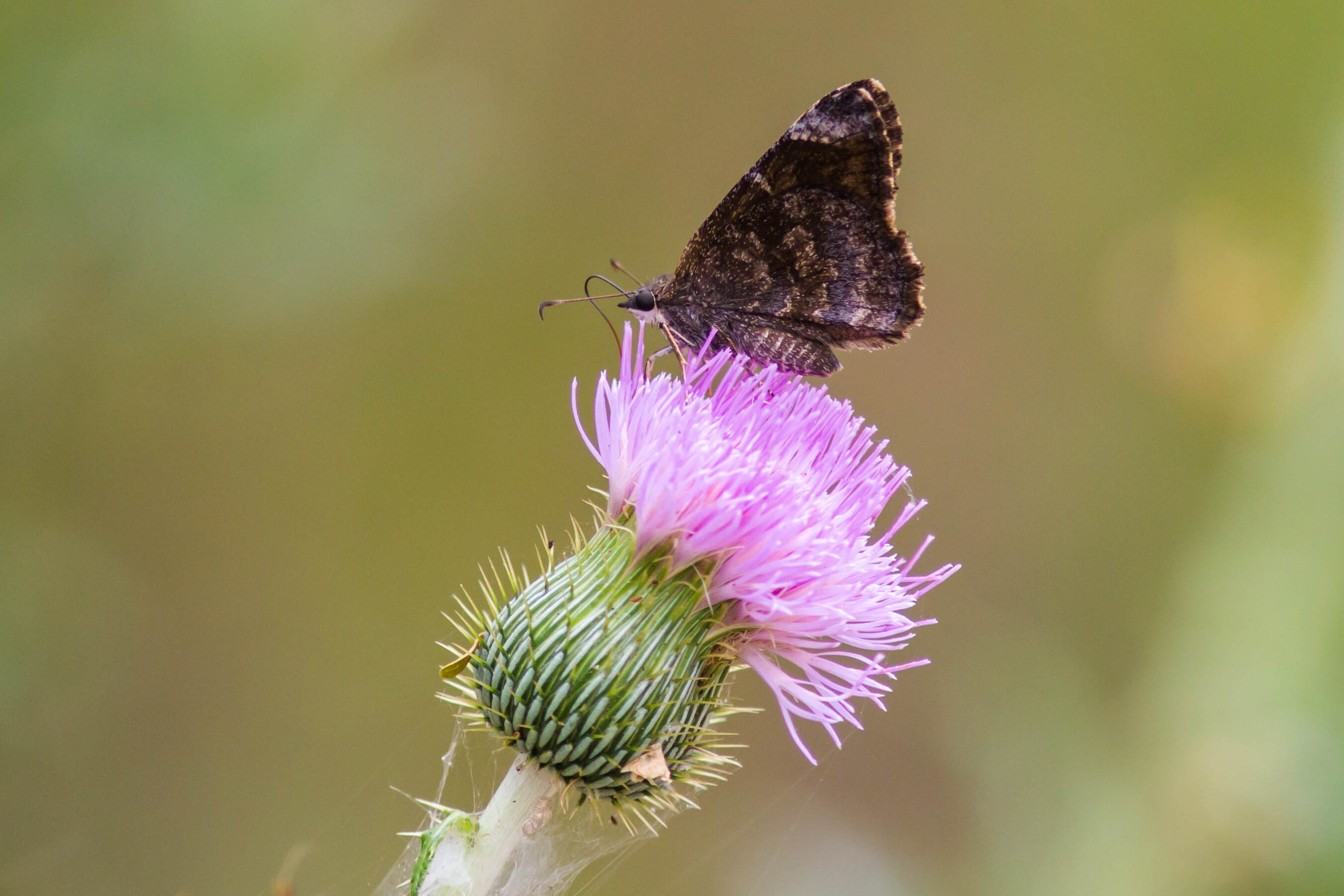
Mimosa skipper (Cogia calchas), Santa Ana NWR

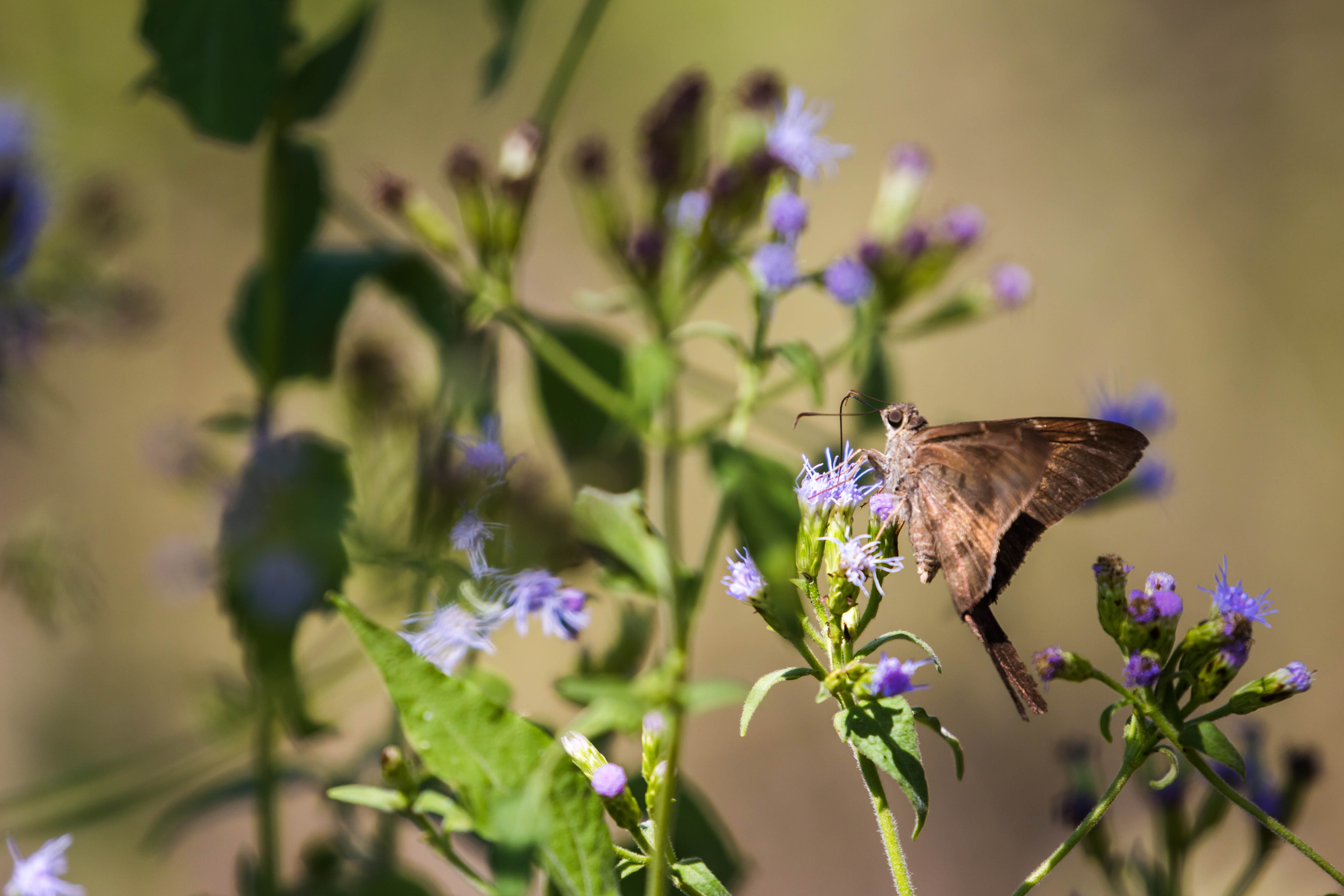
Brown longtail (Spicauda procne), Santa Ana NWR

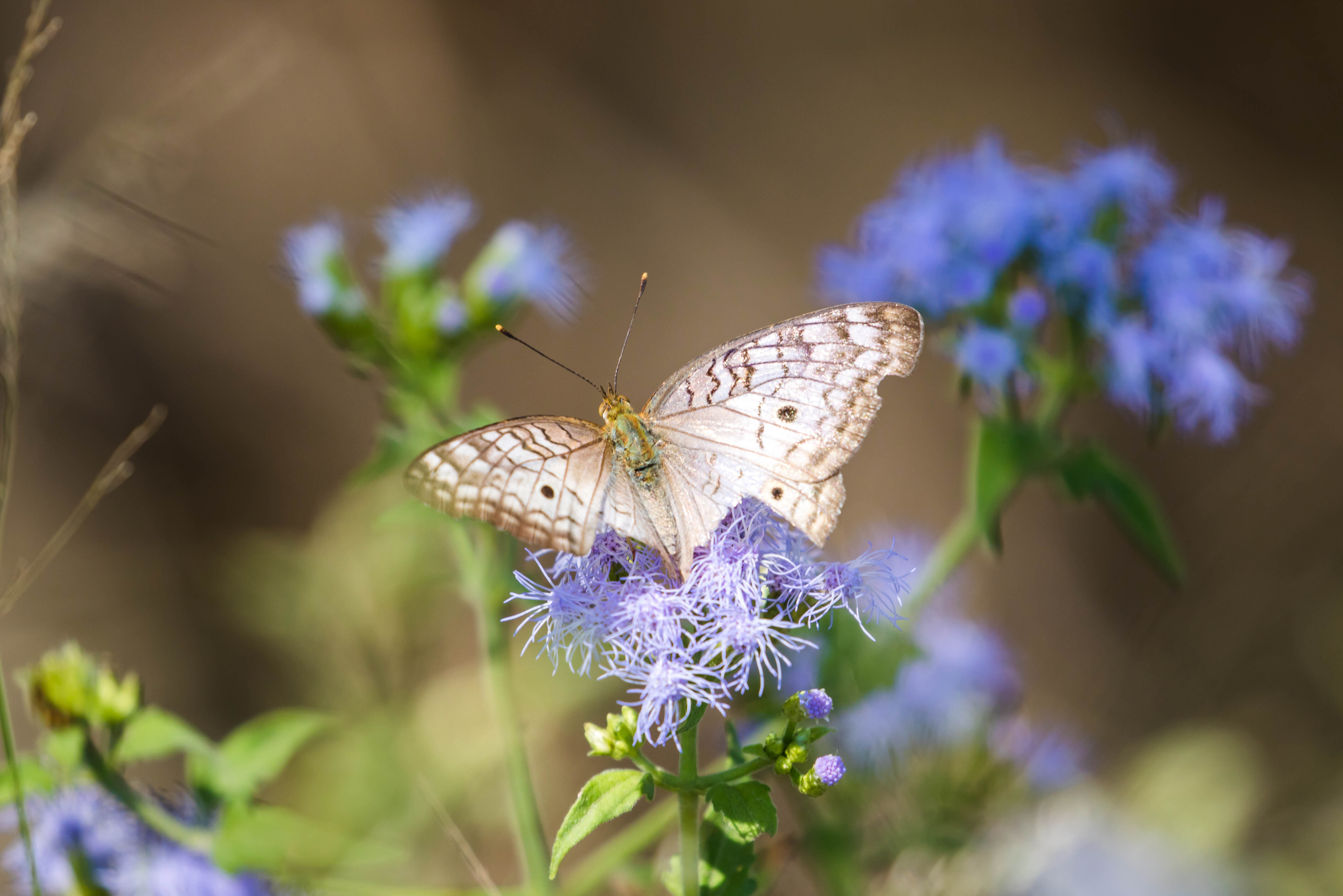
White peacock (Anartia jatrophae), Santa Ana NWR

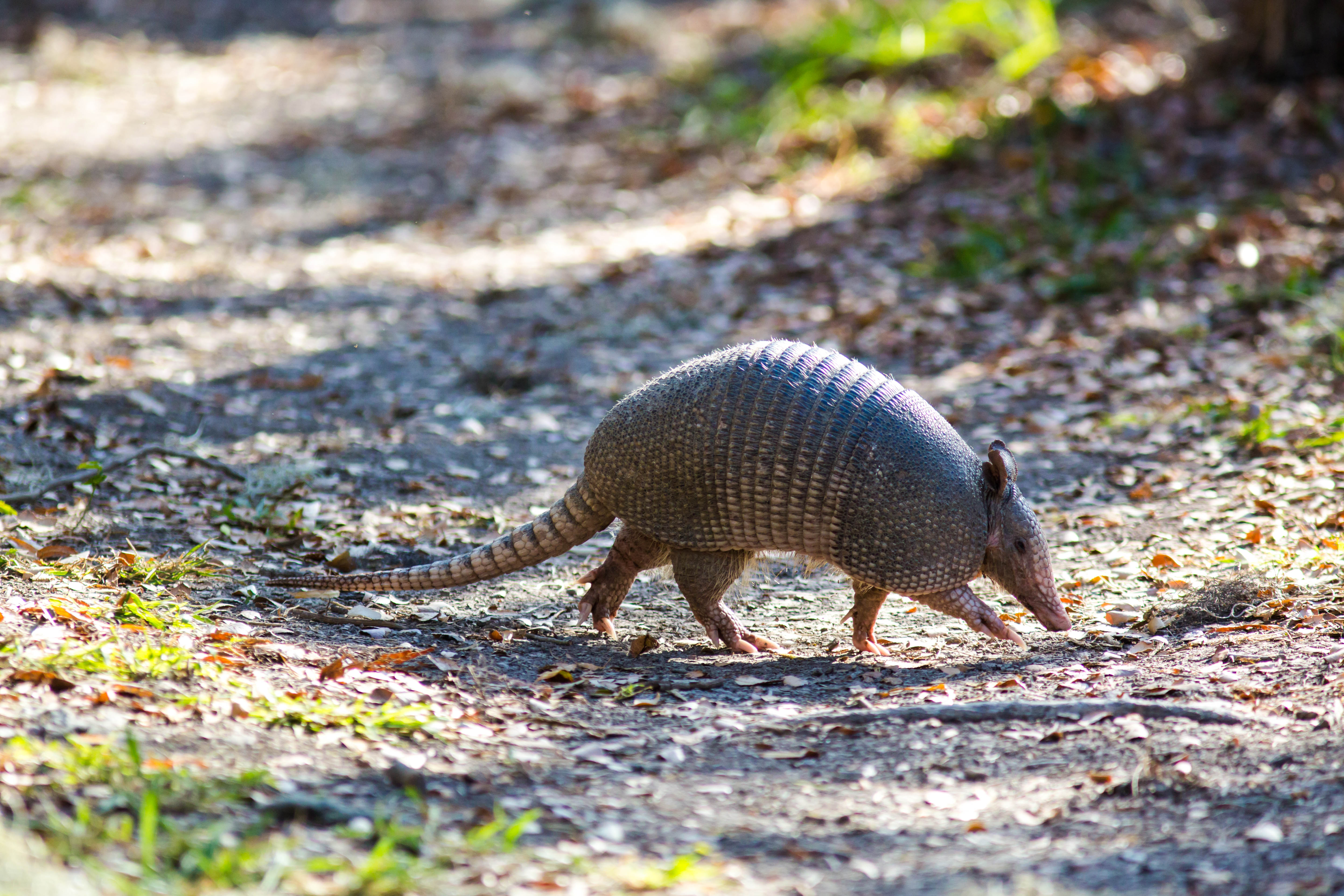
Nine-banded armadillo (Dasypus novemcinctus), Santa Ana NWR
