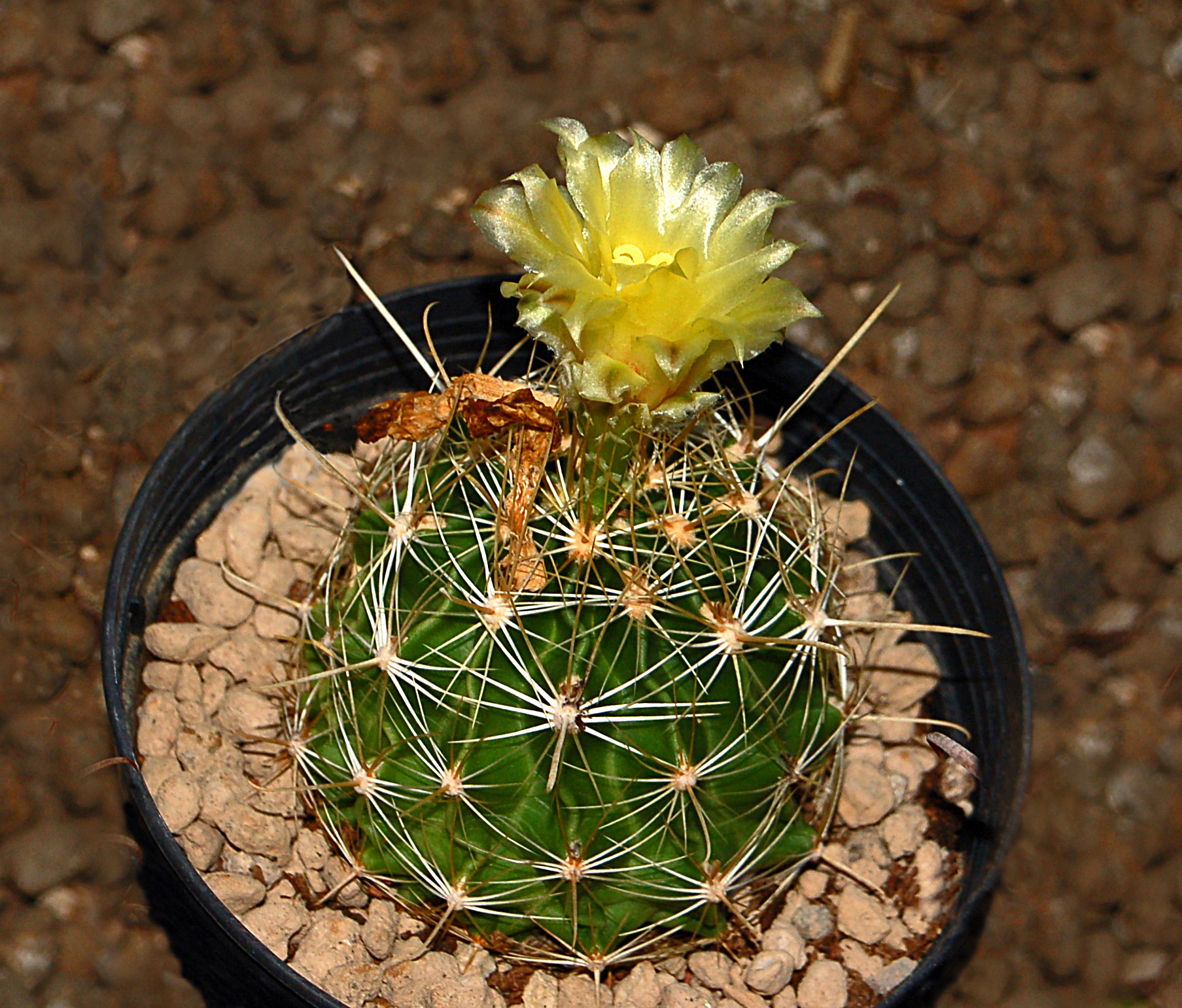
- At the Orto Botanico dell'Università di Genova

Conservation status
- Least Concern (IUCN 3.1)

Scientific classification
- Kingdom: Plantae
- Clade: Tracheophytes
- Clade: Angiosperms
- Clade: Eudicots
- Order: Caryophyllales
- Family: Cactaceae
- Subfamily: Cactoideae
- Genus: Thelocactus
- Species: T. setispinus

Binomial name
- Thelocactus setispinus (Engelm.) E.F.Anderson

Synonyms
- Hamatocactus setispinus (Engelm.) Britton & Rose; Ferocactus setispinus (Engelm.) LDBenson.

= Thelocactus setispinus =

Species of cactus

Thelocactus setispinus, commonly known as miniature barrel cactus or hedgehog cactus, is a species of cactus in the family Cactaceae.

== Description ==
Thelocactus setispinus is globe-shaped to short cylindrical cactus about 8 inches (20 cm) to 12 inches (30 cm) wide and up to 60 centimetres (24 in) tall. The 12 to 15 radial spines are needle-shaped, bright, brown or white and up to 4 inches (10 cm) long. The 1 to 3 central spines are longer and stronger, straight and curved like a hook at the tip. The flowers are orange, dark yellow, magenta, or violet with a red center, about 7 inches (18 cm) long. This cactus blooms in late spring to summer. The fruits are red, round or elliptical, a little scaly, about 8 millimetres (0.31 in) to 10 millimetres (0.39 in).

== Distribution ==
This species is widespread in the southern United States in the State of Texas and the Mexican states of Coahuila, Nuevo León and Tamaulipas. This species has spread throughout the world as an ornamental plant. Its natural habitat is arid deserts, distributed widely but has a scattered population. It usually grows in black or clay soils on coastal lowlands under mesquite scrubs, at an elevation of about 0–550 metres (0–1,804 ft) above sea level. Plants are found growing along Astrophytum asterias, Mammillaria heyderi, Echinocereus stramineus, Echinocereus poselgeri and Homalocephala texensis

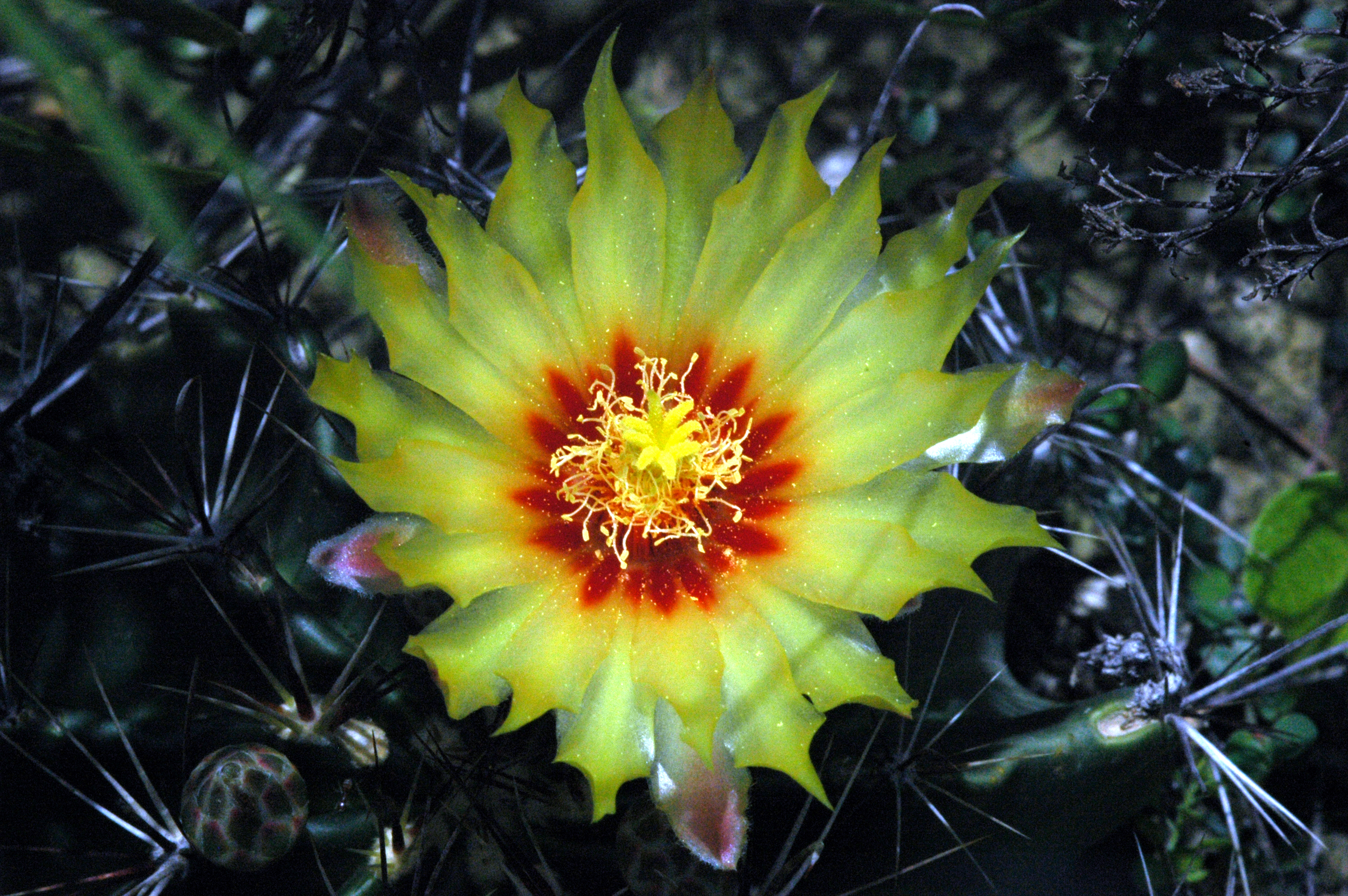
Close-up on a flower of Thelocactus setispinus.

== Taxonomy ==
In 1845 George Engelmann first described the plant as Echinocactus setispinus.The genus name "Theloocactus" derives from the Greek word "Thelo" (wart or nipple) referred to the ribs with closely spaced nipples, while the species name "setispinus" comes from the Latin "seta" meaning "bristle" and "spina" meaning "thorn, spine". Edward Frederick Anderson placed the species in the genus Thelocactus in 1987.
