= Heinrich Poselger =

German botanist (1818–1883)

Heinrich Poselger (25 December 1818 – 4 October 1883) was a German botanist who specialized in studies of succulent plants.

From 1849 to 1851 he collected plants, especially cacti, along the U.S.-Mexico border, and in the process took part in the United States and Mexican Boundary Survey. His collections of cacti were sent to the herbarium at Jena. He was a resident of Berlin, where he maintained an impressive collection of succulents.

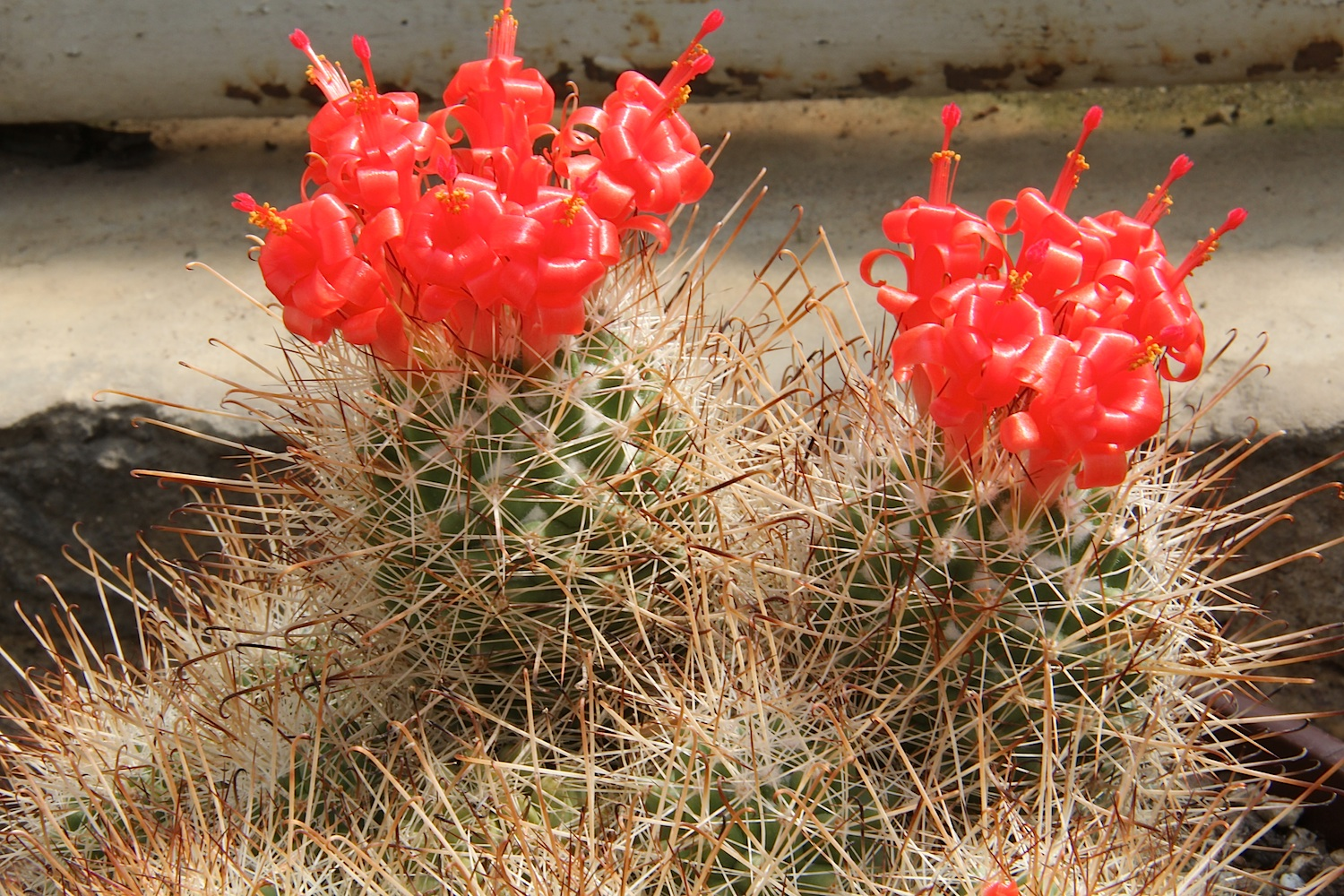
Mammillaria poselgeri

He is the taxonomic authority of numerous species within the family Cactaceae, and has a number of cacti species bearing his name, a few examples being Coryphantha poselgeriana, Echinocereus poselgeri and Mammillaria poselgeri.

== Associated works ==
- Reise nach Mexico in den Jahren, (1849).
- Beitrag zur Kakteenkunde. in "Allgemeine Gartenzeitung", (1853).
- Hundert Jahre der St. Johannis-Loge zum Widder (in Berlin) von 1777 bis 1877, (1877).
- "Heinrich Poselger: cactus articles in Allgemeine Gartenzeitung 1853-1855" (with Christoph Friedrich Otto and Albert Gottfried Dietrich); Cactusville Press.
