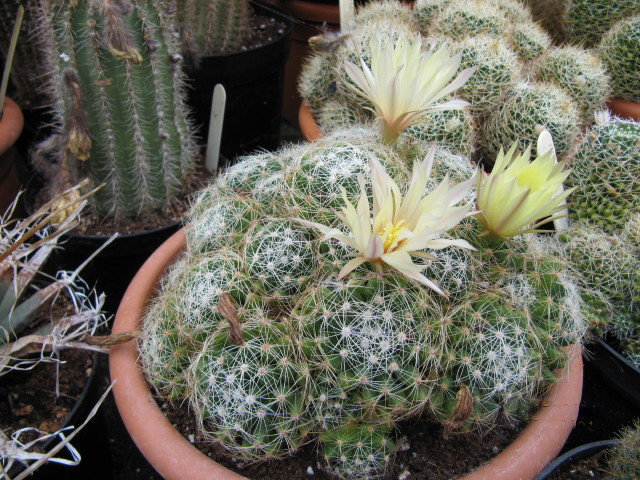

Conservation status
- Least Concern (IUCN 3.1)

Scientific classification
- Kingdom: Plantae
- Clade: Tracheophytes
- Clade: Angiosperms
- Clade: Eudicots
- Order: Caryophyllales
- Family: Cactaceae
- Subfamily: Cactoideae
- Genus: Mammillaria
- Species: M. sphaerica

Binomial name
- Mammillaria sphaerica A.Dietr.

Synonyms
- Mammillaria longimamma var. sphaerica; Cactus sphaericus; Dolicothele sphaerica; Neomamillaria sphaerica

= Mammillaria sphaerica =

Species of cactus

Mammillaria sphaerica, the longmamma nipple cactus or pale mammillaria is a species of flowering plant in the cactus family Cactaceae, native to south eastern Texas in the USA and north eastern Mexico, where it occurs in scattered patches at altitudes up to 1,000 m (3,300 ft). It forms clumps of small pale green spheres (whence sphaerica) to 5 cm (2.0 in) in diameter, with short hairs and pale yellow flowers up to 3 cm (1.2 in) wide in summer.

Its status is listed as "Least Concern" by the IUCN Red List.

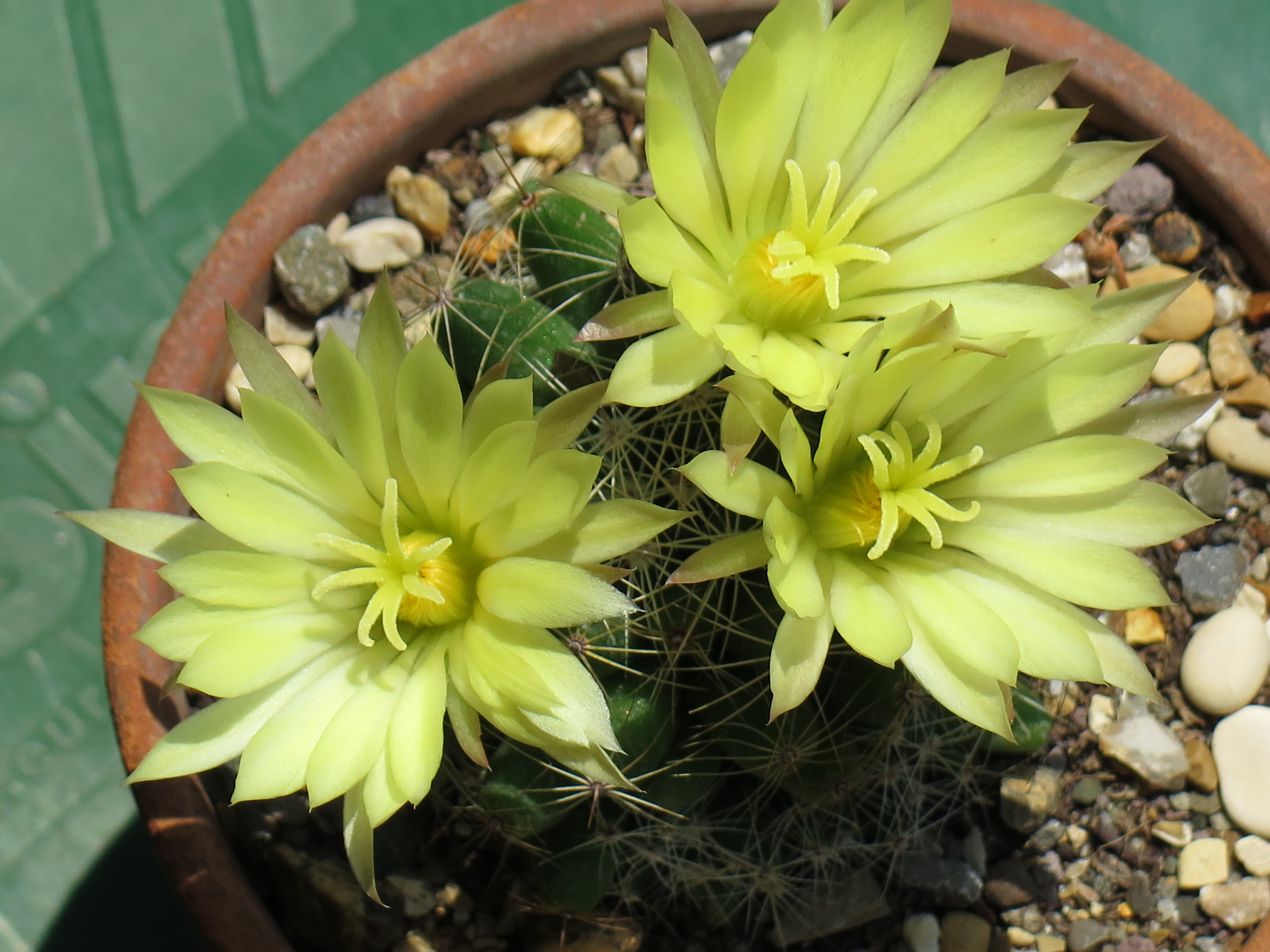
The flowers of Mammillaria spherica

It tolerates temperatures down to 1 °C (34 °F), but not being frozen. As it also requires dry conditions during winter, it is best grown under glass in temperate zones, in a typical free-draining, low nutrient cactus compost, in full sun. This plant has won the Royal Horticultural Society's Award of Garden Merit.
