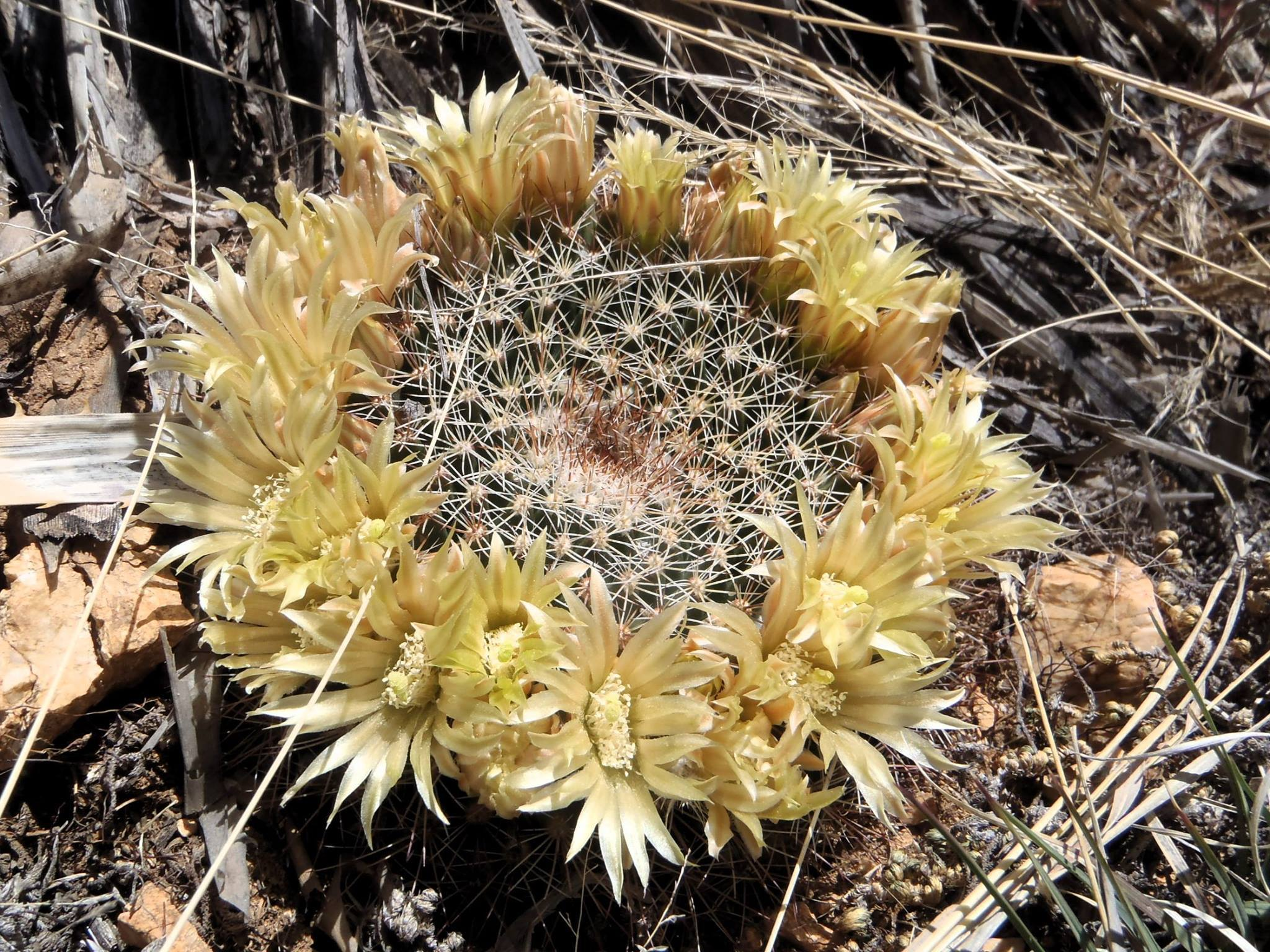
- In flower

Conservation status
- Least Concern (IUCN 3.1)

Scientific classification
- Kingdom: Plantae
- Clade: Tracheophytes
- Clade: Angiosperms
- Clade: Eudicots
- Order: Caryophyllales
- Family: Cactaceae
- Subfamily: Cactoideae
- Genus: Mammillaria
- Species: M. heyderi

Binomial name
- Mammillaria heyderi Muehlenpf.

= Mammillaria heyderi =

Species of cactus

Mammillaria heyderi (commonly known as the Little Nipple cactus) is a species of pincushion cactus in the tribe Cacteae. It is endemic to Sonora and Chihuahua in Mexico and New Mexico, Arizona, Texas, and Oklahoma in the United States.

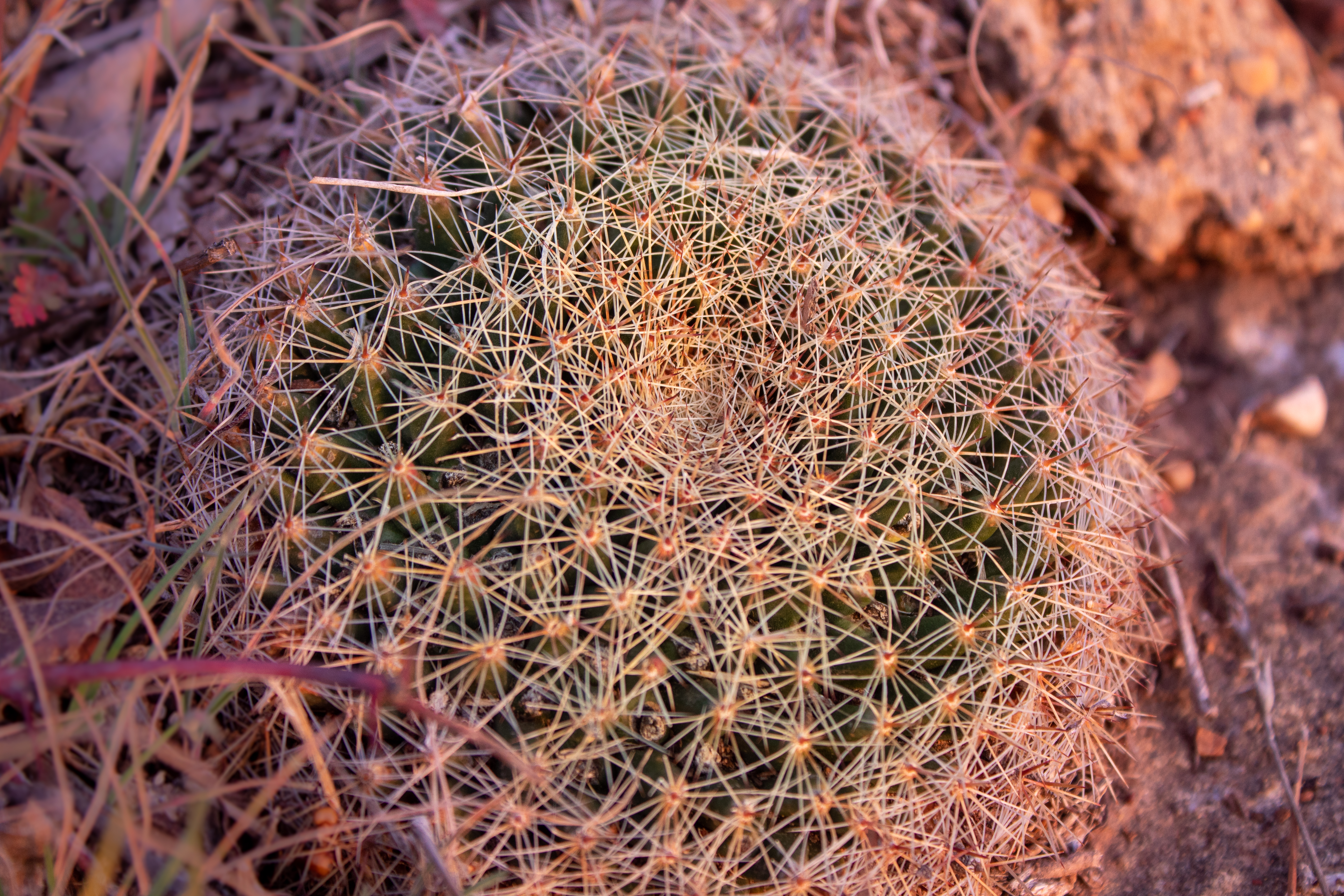
Mammillaria heyderi (Little Nipple cactus) in mid-January in West Texas

Mammillaria heyderi typically grows no more than 1.5 inches above ground and can be hard to spot in winter, when it is nearly below ground level. It is found on dry hillsides and semidesert in lower to middle elevations and is characterized by its covering of short stems growing up to around 8mm high and 4-5mm wide, with up to around 15 spines extending in all directions from the tip of each stem. It is extremely drought resistant and hardy to at least 10 degrees Fahrenheit, and can thrive in different types of dry terrain.

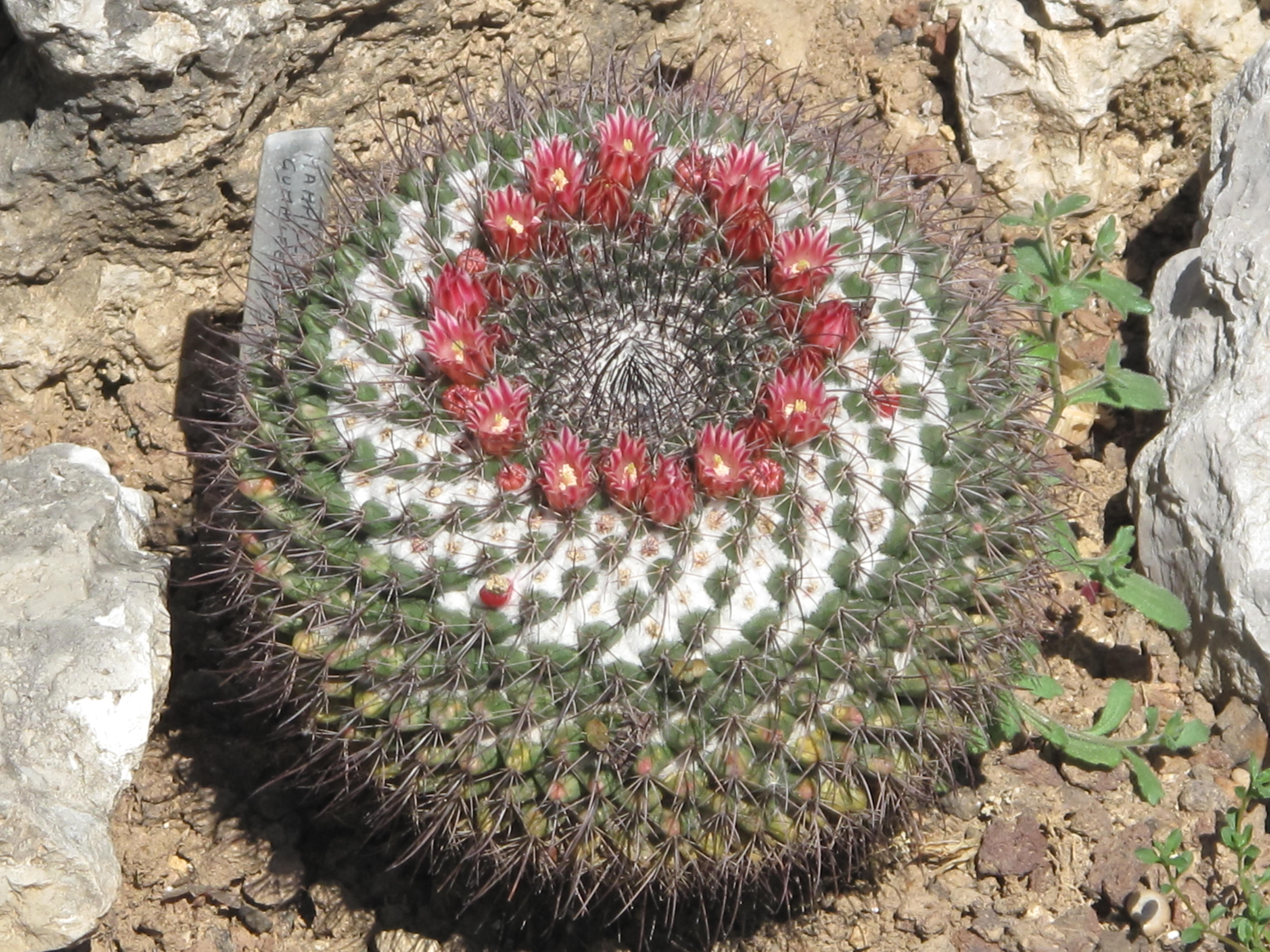
The cactus flowering
