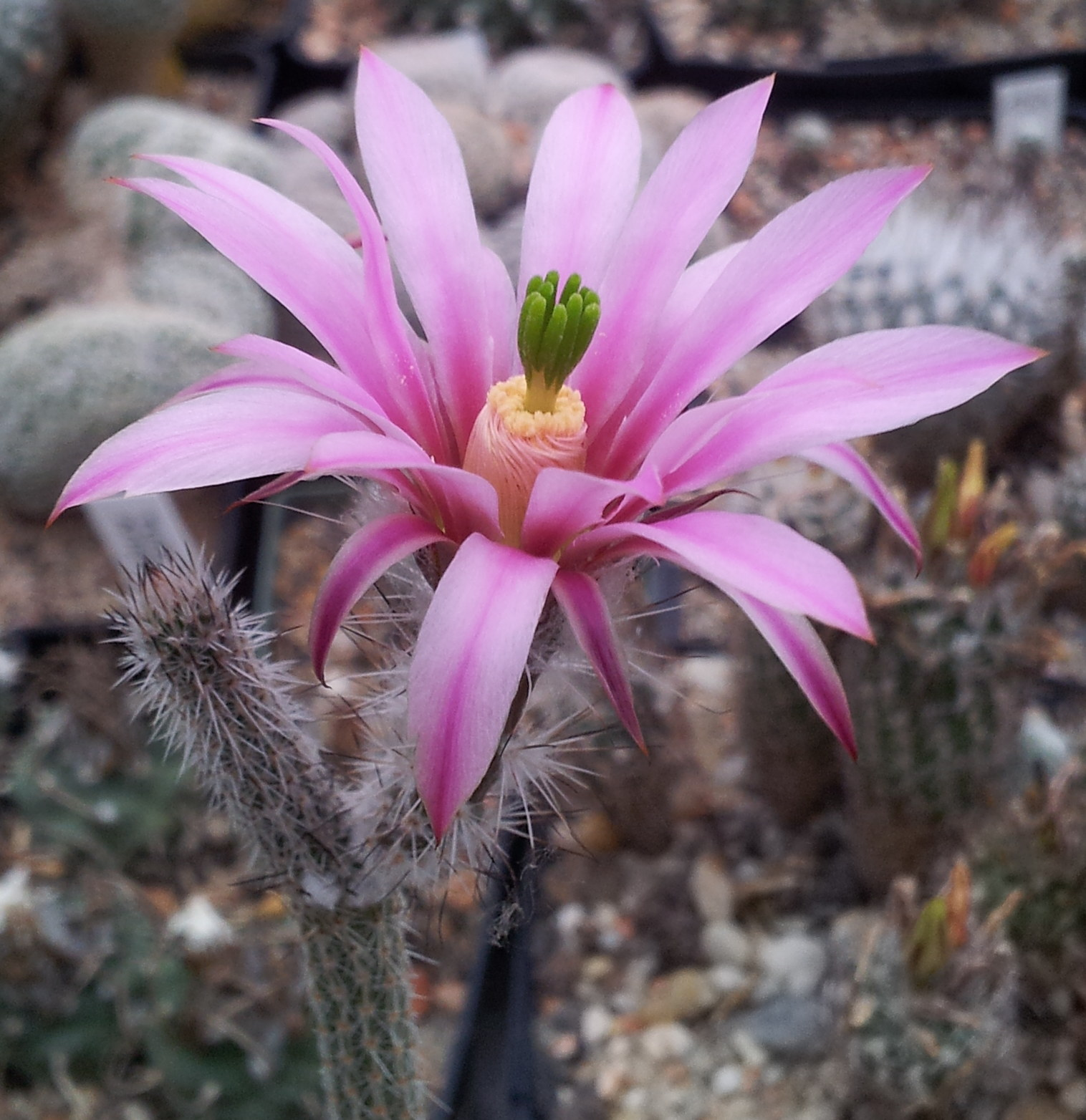

Conservation status
- Least Concern (IUCN 3.1)

Scientific classification
- Kingdom: Plantae
- Clade: Tracheophytes
- Clade: Angiosperms
- Clade: Eudicots
- Order: Caryophyllales
- Family: Cactaceae
- Subfamily: Cactoideae
- Genus: Echinocereus
- Species: E. poselgeri

Binomial name
- Echinocereus poselgeri Lem.

Synonyms
- Cereus poselgeri (Lem.) J.M.Coult. 1896; Cereus tuberosus Poselg. 1853; Wilcoxia poselgeri (Lem.) Britton & Rose 1909; Echinocereus poselgeri subsp. gerhardii Waldeis, W.Blum & D.Felix 2008; Echinocereus tamaulipensis (Werderm.) Mich.Lange 1995; Echinocereus tuberosus Poselg. ex Rümpler 1886; Wilcoxia tamaulipensis Werderm. 1938; Wilcoxia tamaulipensis var. brevissima A.Cartier 1980

= Echinocereus poselgeri =

Species of cactus

Echinocereus poselgeri, also known as the dahlia cactus, is a species of Echinocereus. It is native to Coahuila and southern Texas.

== Description ==
Echinocereus poselgeri typically grows with several spreading shoots, forming a tuberous, dahlia-like rhizome. The dark blue-green shoots are slender, cylindrical, and taper to a point, measuring 60 to 120 cm (24 to 47 in) long and 1 to 2 cm (0.39 to 0.79 in) in diameter. They have eight to ten low, inconspicuous ribs that are not tuberculated. A single, slightly flattened, dark central spine points toward the shoot tip and is up to 9 mm (0.35 in) long. The eight to 16 whitish or grayish marginal spines, which have darker tips, are 2 to 4.5 mm (0.079 to 0.177 in) long.

The funnel-shaped flowers are slightly pinkish-magenta, appearing near the tips of the shoots. They can be up to 6 cm (2.4 in) long and 7 cm (2.8 in) in diameter. The dark green to brown fruits are egg-shaped and covered with persistent wool and thorns.

== Distribution ==
Echinocereus poselgeri is growing in scrub valleys and hills of southern Texas, USA, and the Mexican states of Coahuila, Nuevo León, Tamaulipas, and San Luis Potosí, typically found at low elevations in sandy soil at elevations up to 1150 meters.

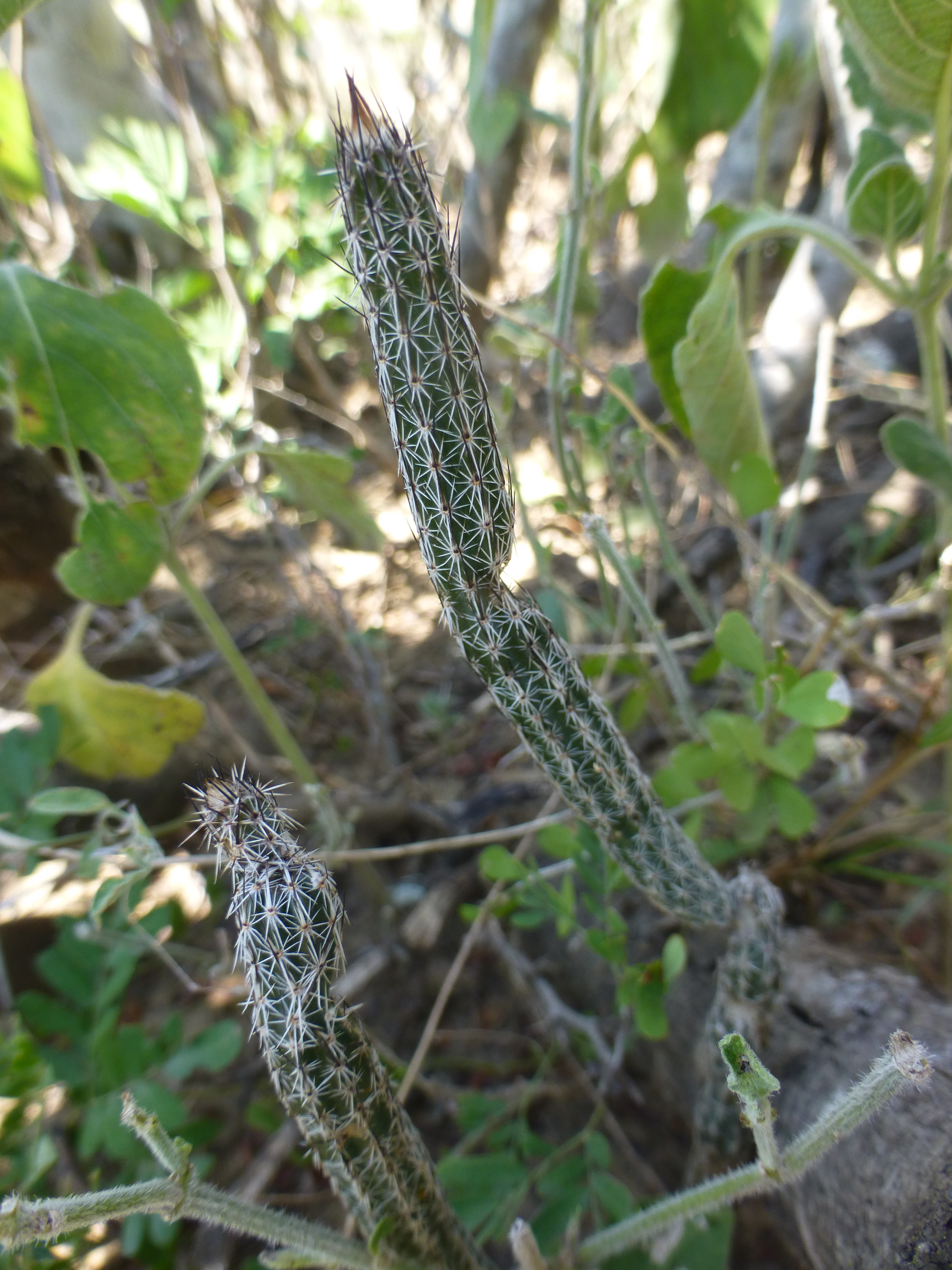
Plant growing in habitat in Nuevo León

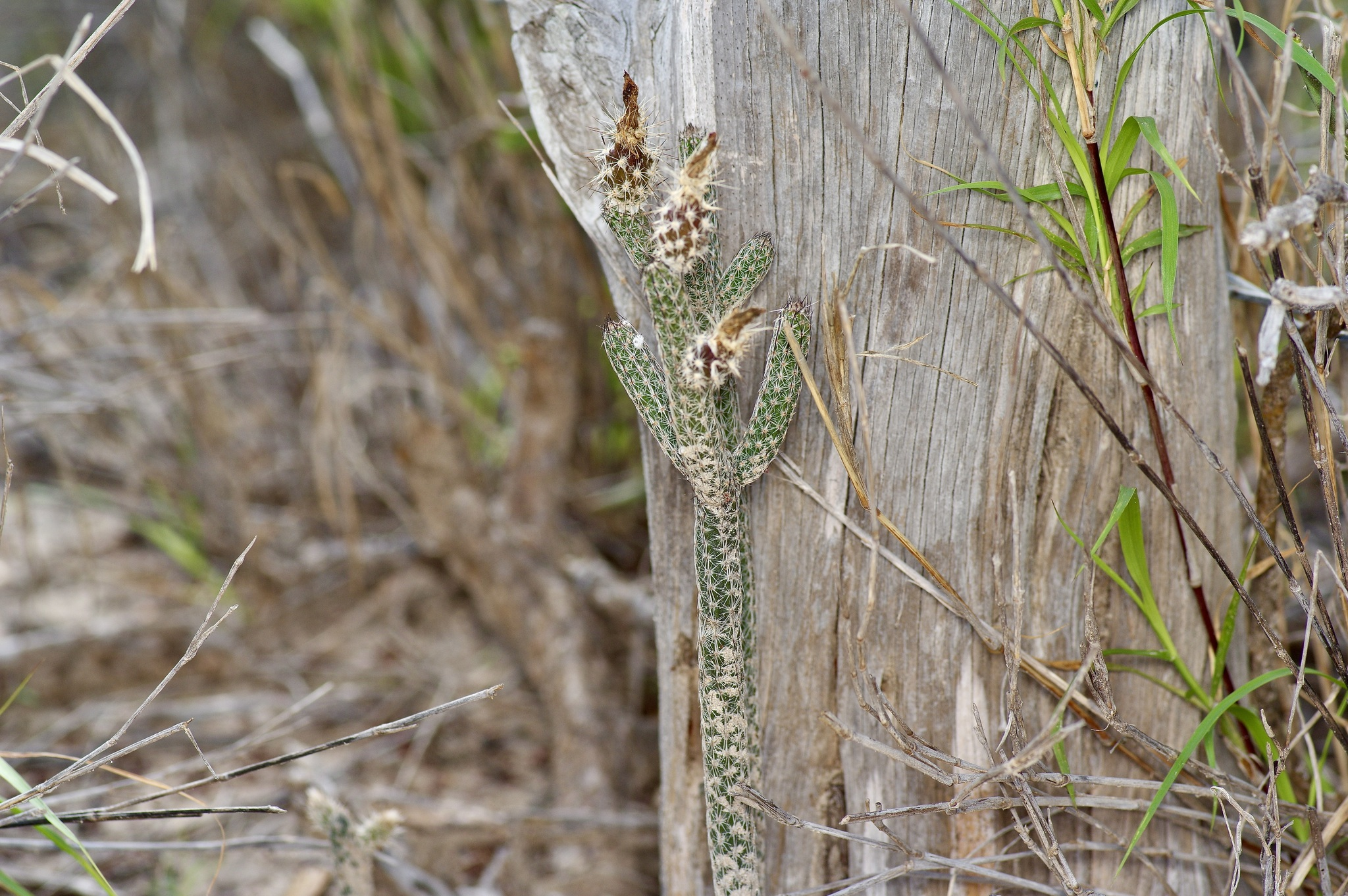
Plant growing in Zapata, Texas

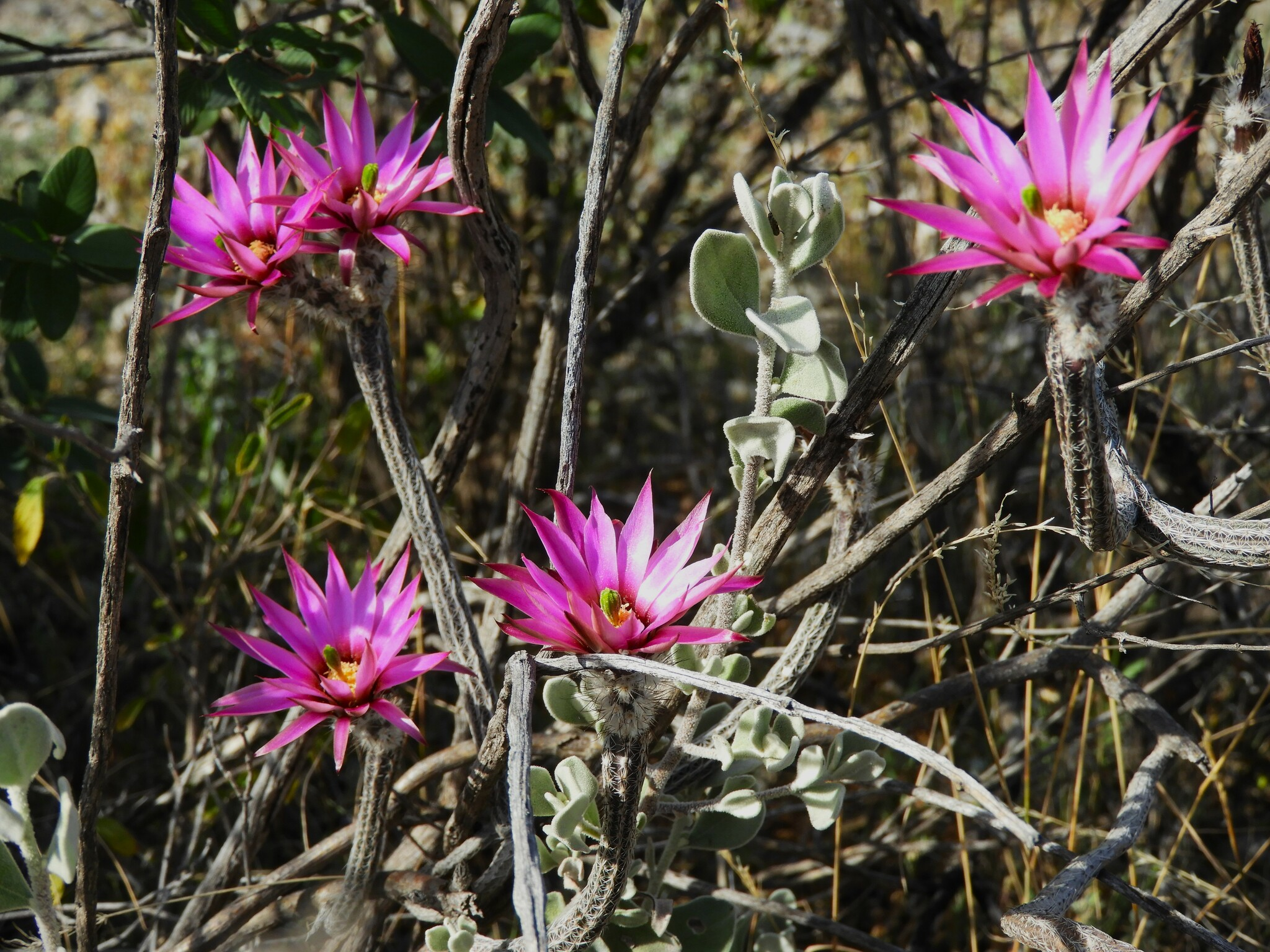
Plant blooming in Coahuila, Mexico

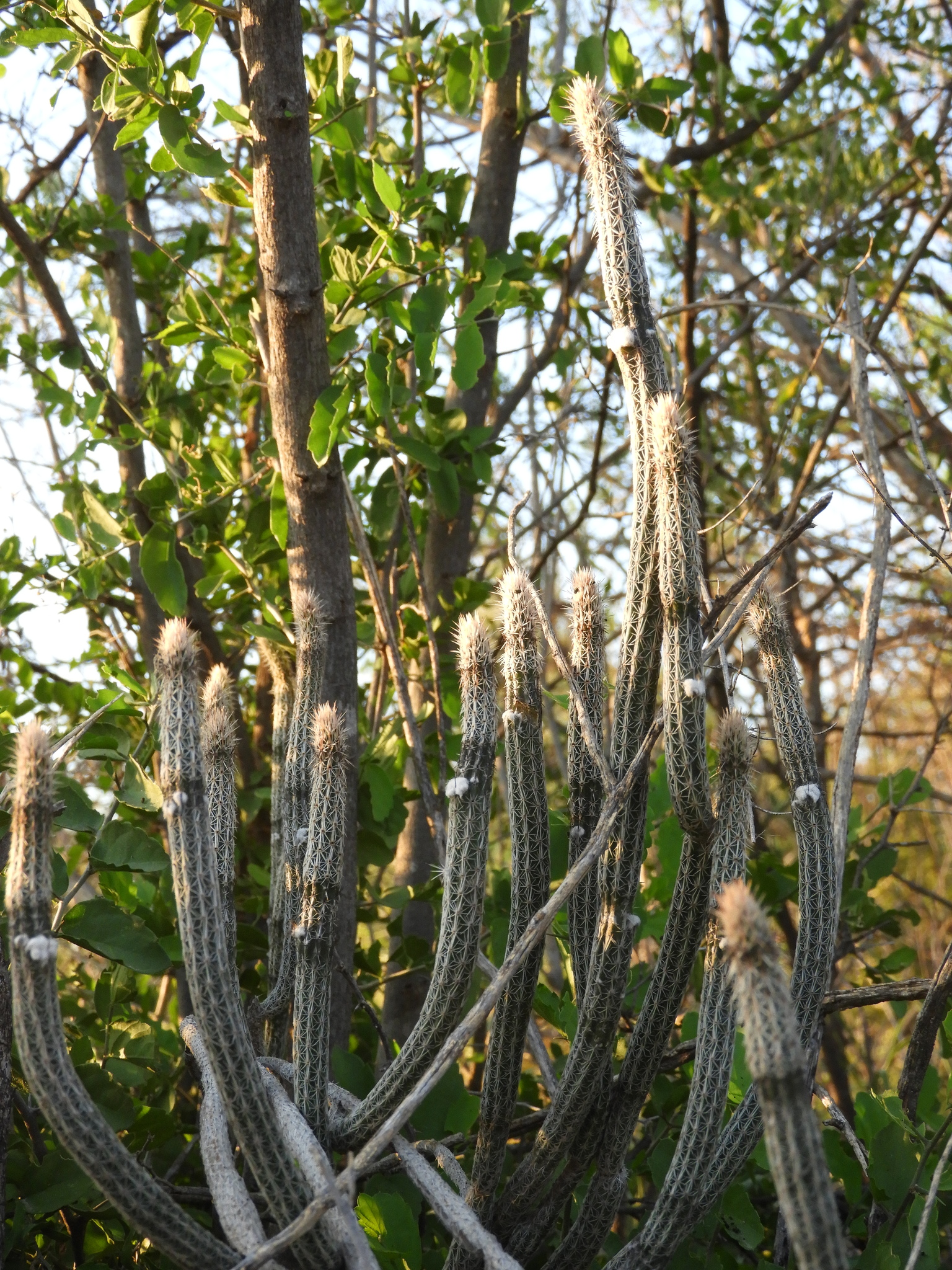
Plant growing in Coahuila, Mexico

== Taxonomy ==
Charles Lemaire first described the species in 1868. The specific epithet poselgeri honors Heinrich Poselger, a German doctor, chemist, and botanist who collected succulent plants in North America from 1849 to 1851.

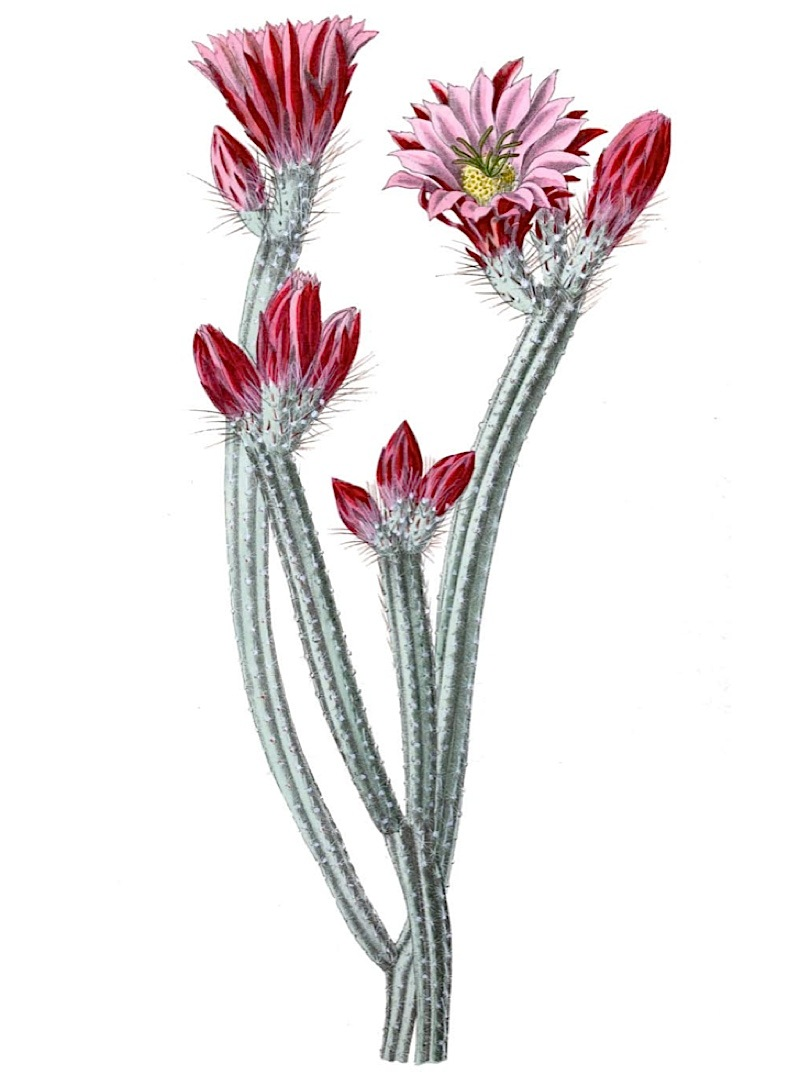
Echinocereus poselgeri from Blühende Kakteen - Iconographia Cactacearum 1904
