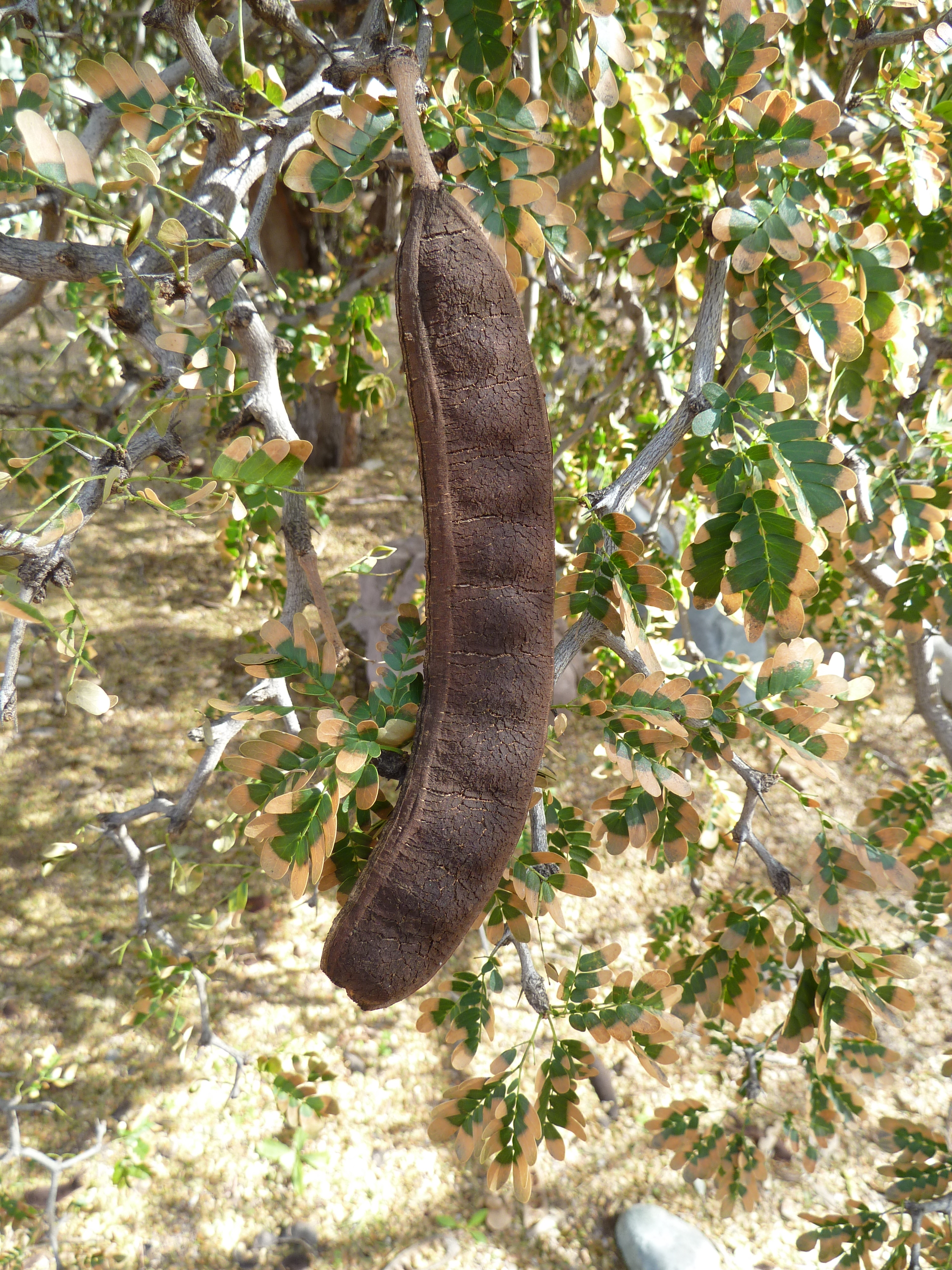
- Fruit

Conservation status
- Least Concern (IUCN 3.1)

Scientific classification
- Kingdom: Plantae
- Clade: Tracheophytes
- Clade: Angiosperms
- Clade: Eudicots
- Clade: Rosids
- Order: Fabales
- Family: Fabaceae
- Subfamily: Caesalpinioideae
- Clade: Mimosoid clade
- Genus: Ebenopsis
- Species: E. ebano

Binomial name
- Ebenopsis ebano (Berland.) Barneby & J.W.Grimes
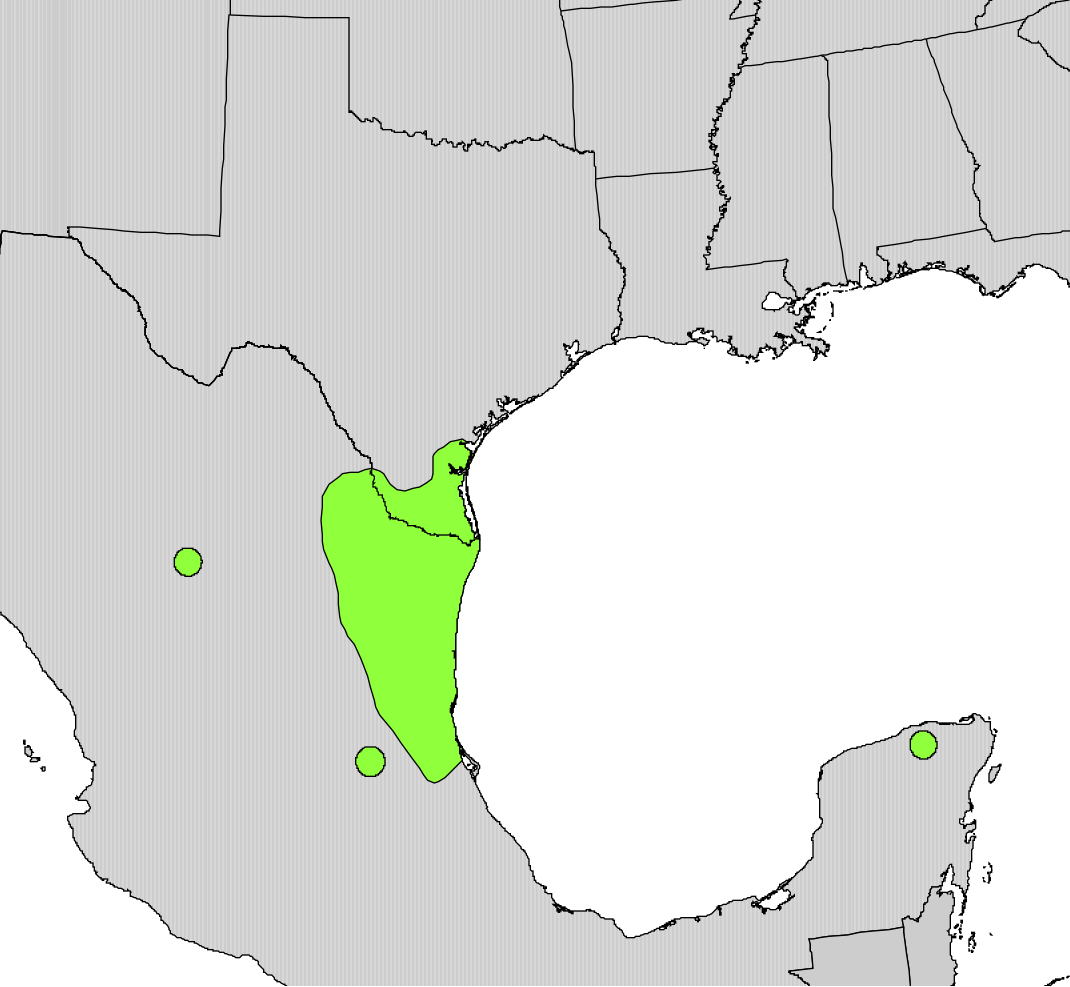
- Natural range

Synonyms
- Acacia flexicaulis Benth. Chloroleucon ebano (Berland.) L.Rico; Mimosa ebano Berland. Pithecellobium ebano (Berland.) C.H.Müll. Pithecellobium flexicaule (Benth.) J.M.Coult. Zygia flexicaulis (Benth.) Sudw.

= Ebenopsis ebano =

Species of legume

Ebenopsis ebano is a species of flowering plant in the family Fabaceae, that is native to the coastal plain of southern Texas in the United States and eastern Mexico. It is commonly known as Texas ebony or ebano (in Spanish).

== Description ==
Texas ebony is a small, evergreen tree that reaches a height of 7.6–9.1 m (25–30 ft) and a crown width of 1.8–4.6 m (5.9–15.1 ft).

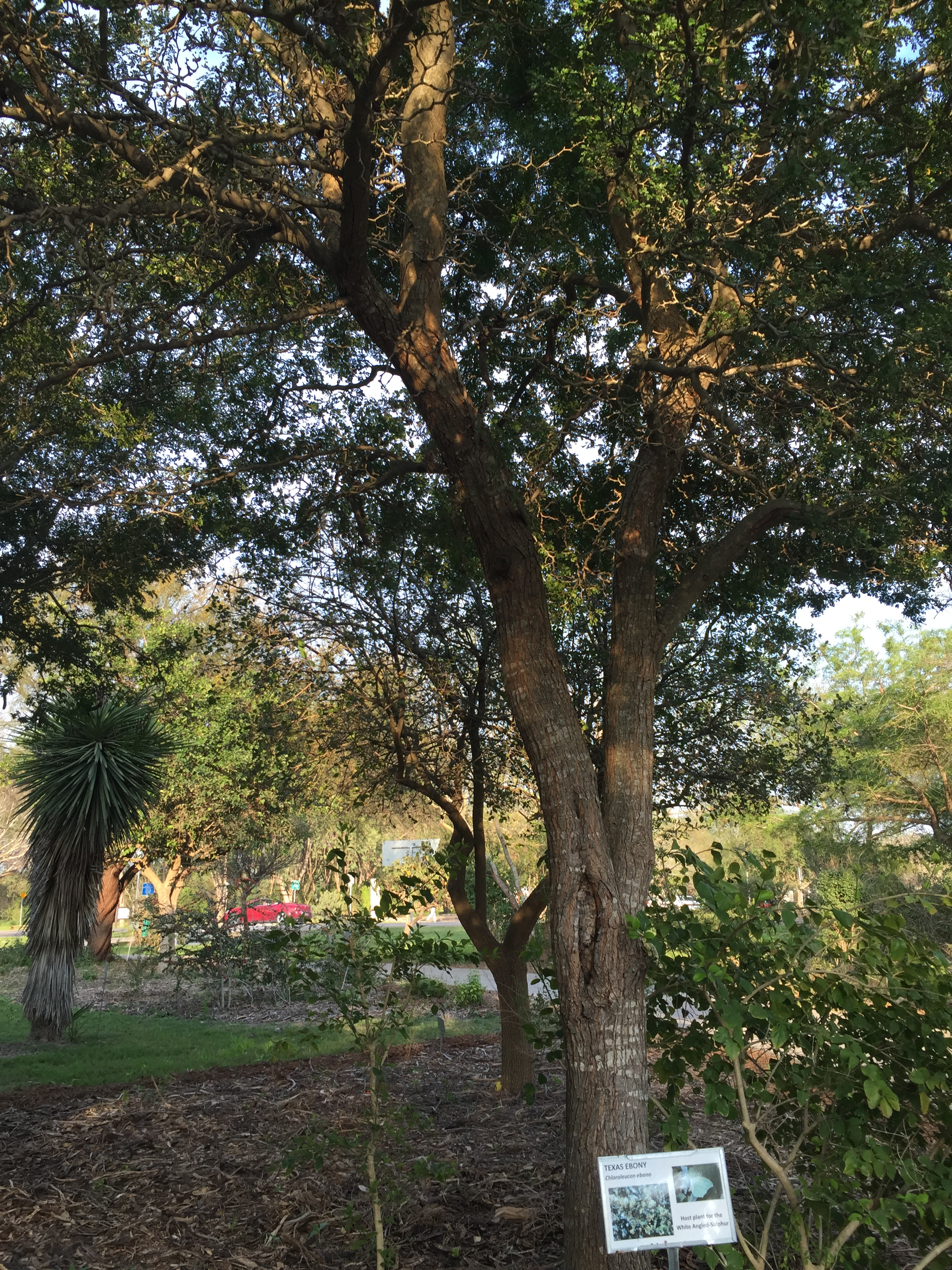
Texas ebony (Ebenopsis ebano)

== Habitat and range ==
The range of E. ebano stretches from Laredo and Corpus Christi, Texas south through the states of Tamaulipas, Nuevo León, San Luis Potosí, Veracruz, Campeche, and Yucatán in Mexico. It can be found in the Tamaulipan matorral, Tamaulipan mezquital, Veracruz dry forests, and Yucatán dry forests ecoregions. Its habitat extends from sea level to 1,000 m (3,300 ft), averages 20 to 27 °C (68 to 81 °F) in temperature, and receives a mean of 900 mm (35 in) of annual rainfall.

== Uses ==
Texas ebony is cultivated in xeriscaping for its dense foliage and fragrant flowers. It is also used in bonsai.

== Ecology ==
Ebenopsis ebano is a host plant for the caterpillars of the coyote cloudywing (Achalarus toxeus) and Sphingicampa blanchardi. The seedpods host the bean weevils Stator beali and S. limbatus. Despite the native range of Texas ebony overlapping with that of the latter, S. limbatus only feeds upon it in locales where it is grown as an ornamental and is not native. E. ebano is also a preferred host of the epiphyte Bailey's ball moss (Tillandsia baileyi).
