= Antaeotricha haesitans =

Scientific classification
- Domain: Eukaryota
- Kingdom: Animalia
- Phylum: Arthropoda
- Class: Insecta
- Order: Lepidoptera
- Family: Depressariidae
- Genus: Antaeotricha
- Species: A. haesitans

Binomial name
- Antaeotricha haesitans (Walsingham, 1912)

Synonyms
- Aedemoses haesitans Walsingham, 1912

Species of moth

Antaeotricha haesitans is a moth in the family Depressariidae. It was described by Lord Walsingham in 1912. It is found in Mexico (Durango) and the United States, where it has been recorded from Texas.

The wingspan is about 12 mm. The forewings are pale fawn-ochreous, with an oblique fawn-brown line from the commencement of the costal cilia, descending straight to the tornus. A minute spot of the same at the end of the cell, another on the cell halfway between this and the base, a third in the middle of the fold. From the plical spot a line of brown scales descends obliquely outward to the dorsum and is diffused along it nearly to the tornus, but not conspicuously. There are a few small brown dots around the apex and termen at the base of the pale fawn cilia. The hindwings are fawn-brownish.

The larvae feed on Pithecellobium flexicaule.
