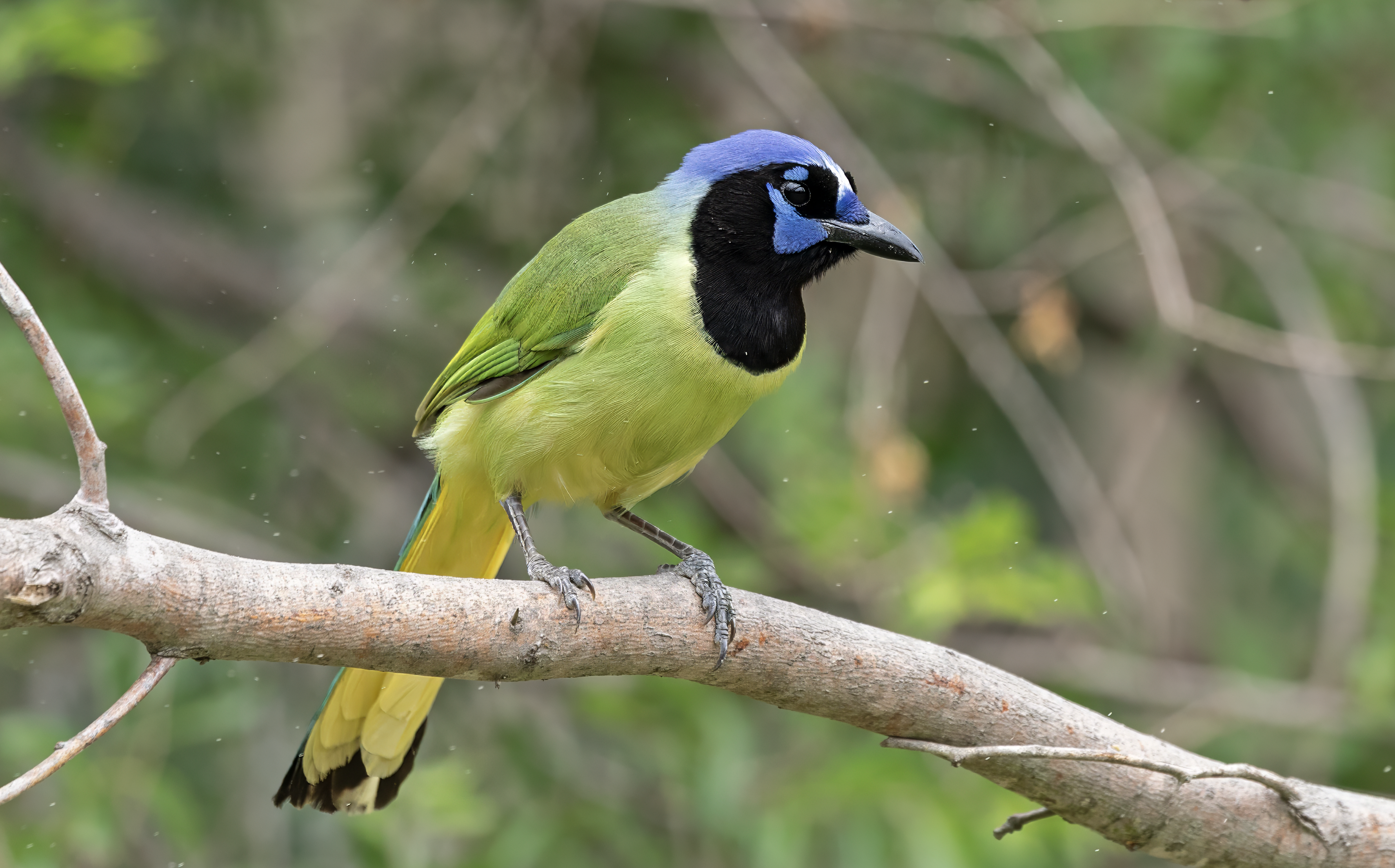
- Cyanocorax luxuosus glaucescens in Mission, Texas; note the greenish underparts and dark eye

Conservation status
- Least Concern (IUCN 3.1)

Scientific classification
- Kingdom: Animalia
- Phylum: Chordata
- Class: Aves
- Order: Passeriformes
- Family: Corvidae
- Genus: Cyanocorax
- Species: C. luxuosus

Binomial name
- Cyanocorax luxuosus (Lesson, RP, 1839)

= Green jay =

Species of bird

The green jay (Cyanocorax luxuosus) is a species of New World jay, found in southern Texas, Mexico, and northern Central America. Adults are about 27 cm (11 in) long and are variable in color across their range; they usually have blue and black heads, green wings and mantle, bluish-green tails, black bills, yellow or brown eye rings, and dark legs. The basic diet consists of arthropods, vertebrates, seeds, and fruit. The nest is usually built in a thorny bush; the female incubates the clutch of three to five eggs. This is a common species of jay with a wide range and the International Union for Conservation of Nature has rated its conservation status as being of "least concern".

== Taxonomy ==
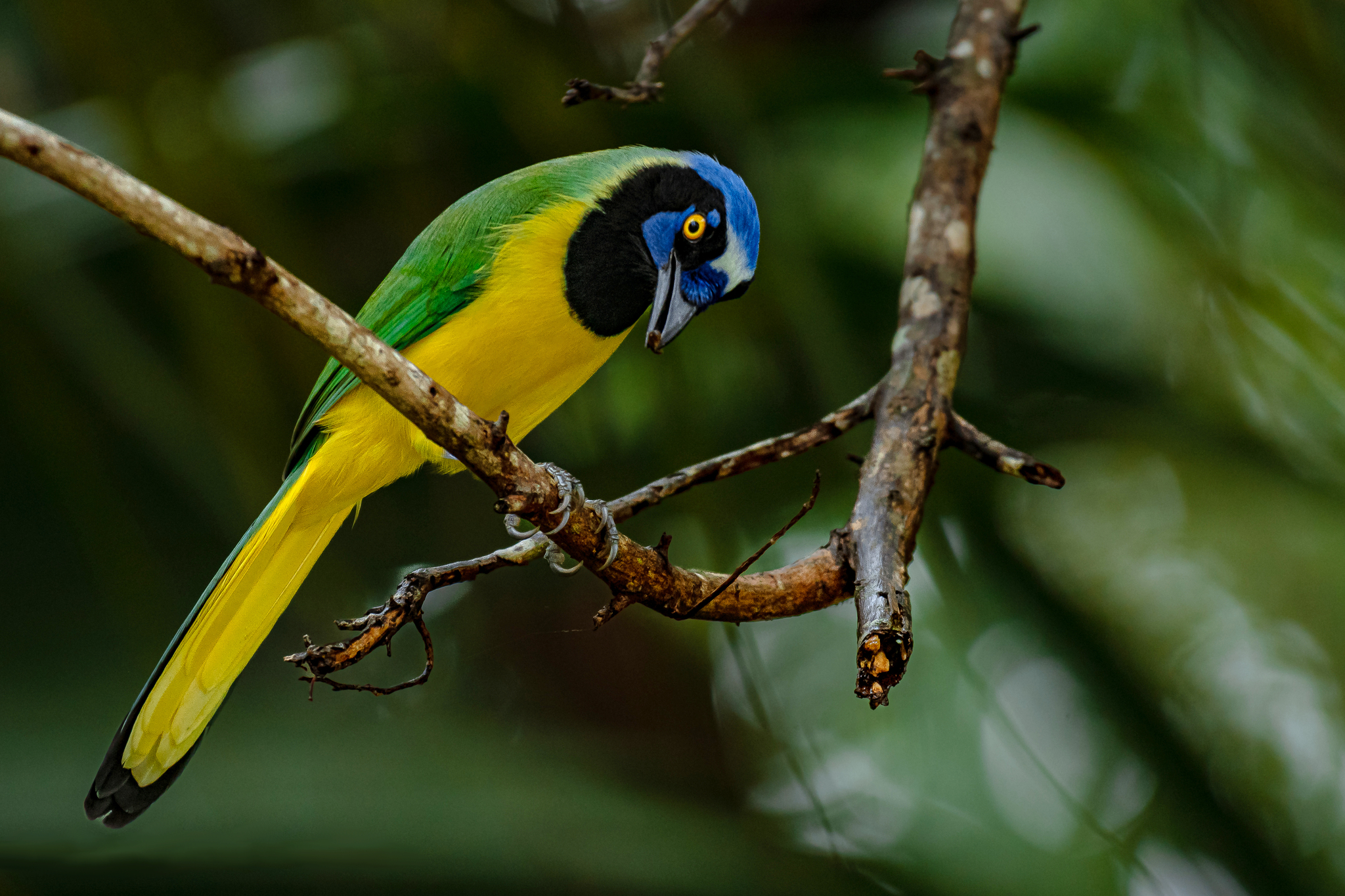
Cyanocorax luxuosus maya in Quintana Roo, Yucatán Peninsula, Mexico; note the brighter yellow underparts and yellow eye

Seven subspecies are accepted; listed from north to south:

- Cyanocorax luxuosus glaucescens – Southern Texas, northeast Mexico
- Cyanocorax luxuosus luxuosus – East-central Mexico
- Cyanocorax luxuosus speciosus – Western Mexico
- Cyanocorax luxuosus vividus – Southwestern Mexico
- Cyanocorax luxuosus maya – Yucatán Peninsula
- Cyanocorax luxuosus confusus – Southeastern Mexico to western Guatemala
- Cyanocorax luxuosus centralis – Honduras

It differs from the related Inca jay of the Andes most obviously in lacking the large nasal bristles that form a distinct tuft at the base of the bill in that species, and also tends to show more blue on the rear crown. Despite its separation from the Inca jay by a 1,600 km range gap, some ornithologists treat the green jay and Inca jay as conspecific, with the green jay as C. yncas luxuosus and the Inca jay as C. yncas yncas.

=== Hybrids ===
A hybrid between green jay and the only distantly-related blue jay Cyanocitta cristata, given the portmanteau name "grue jay", has been documented in southern Texas where the ranges of the two species meet.

== Description ==
Green jays are 25–29 cm (9.8–11.4 in) in length. Weight ranges from 66 to 110 grams (2.3 to 3.9 oz). They have feathers of yellowish-white with blue tips on the top of the head, cheeks and nape. The breast and underparts range from bright yellow in the south (e.g. C. l. maya in the Yucatán) to pale green in the north (e.g. C. l. glaucescens in Texas). The upper parts are rich green. The color of the iris depends on the subspecies, ranging from dark brownish in the north to bright yellow in the south.

== Behavior ==
Green jays feed on a wide range of insects and other invertebrates and various cereal grains. They take Ebenopsis seeds where these occur, and also acorns of any oak species, which they will cache. Meat and human scraps add to the diet when opportunity arises. Green jays have been observed using sticks as tools to extract insects from tree bark.

=== Breeding ===
Green jays usually build a nest in a tree or in a thorny bush or thicket, and the female lays three to five eggs. Only the female incubates, but both parents take care of the young.

=== Voice ===
As with most of the typical jays, this species has a very extensive voice repertoire. The bird's most common call makes a rassh-rassh-rassh sound, but many other unusual notes also occur. One of the most distinctive calls sounds like an alarm bell.

== Distribution and habitat ==
The green jay occurs from southern Texas to Honduras. The similar Inca jay has a disjunct home range in the northern Andes of South America.

== Status ==
The green jay is a common species throughout most of its wide range. It is an adaptable species and the population is thought to be increasing as clearing of forests is creating new areas of suitable habitat. No particular threats have been identified, and the International Union for Conservation of Nature has rated its conservation status as being of "least concern".
