= Stator vachelliae =

Scientific classification
- Kingdom: Animalia
- Phylum: Arthropoda
- Class: Insecta
- Order: Coleoptera
- Suborder: Polyphaga
- Infraorder: Cucujiformia
- Family: Chrysomelidae
- Genus: Stator
- Species: S. vachelliae

Binomial name
- Stator vachelliae Bottimer, 1973

Species of beetle

Stator vachelliae is a species of leaf beetle in the family Chrysomelidae. It is found in Central America, North America, and South America.
