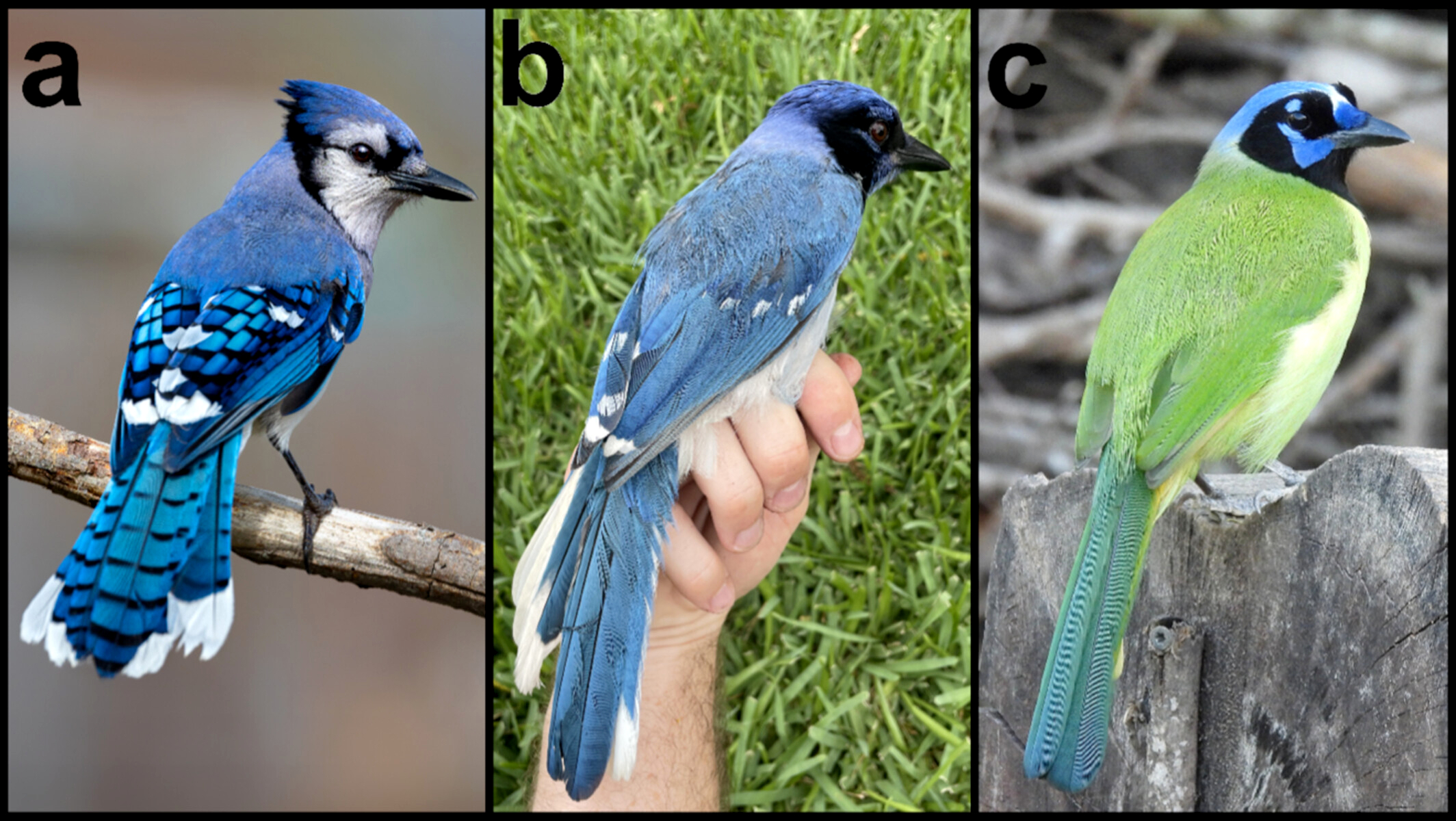
- Blue jay (a), hybrid (b), and green jay (c)

Scientific classification
- Kingdom: Animalia
- Phylum: Chordata
- Class: Aves
- Order: Passeriformes
- Superfamily: Corvoidea
- Family: Corvidae
- Hybrid: Cyanocitta cristata♂ × Cyanocorax luxuosus♀
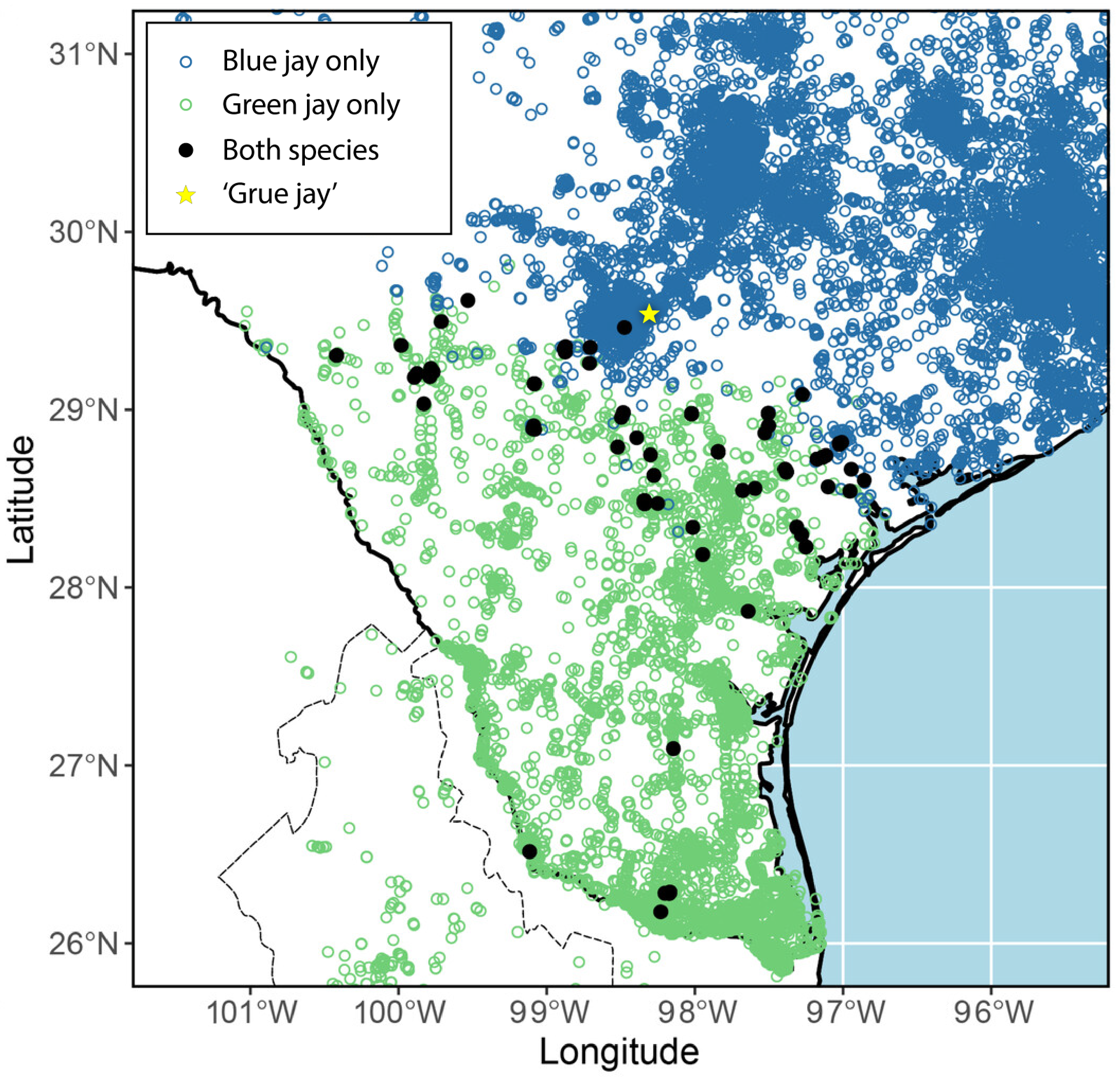
- Known 'grue jay' locality [★] and distribution of its parent species [〇, 〇] in Texas

= Grue jay =

Bird hybrid

Grue jay is the informal portmanteau name for a wild hybrid between a blue jay and green jay observed in Texas, United States in 2023.

== Discovery ==
In May 2023, a post on the Facebook group "TEXBIRDS" reported that the bird had been observed near a yard in Bexar County, Texas. The individual was first suspected to be a hybrid of a blue jay and a green jay for sharing vocal and morphological characteristics of both birds, which was later confirmed. Researchers from the University of Texas at Austin observed the bird the following month after its capture, and collected a blood sample before attaching a metal leg band and releasing it on-site. The bird was not seen in the following years, but returned to the same location in June 2025. Following its description in the scientific journal Ecology and Evolution, press coverage nicknamed it the 'grue jay', referencing the common names of both parent species.

== Biology ==
The observed hybrid specimen is the offspring of a female green jay (Cyanocorax luxuosus, formerly Cyanocorax yncas pro parte) and a male blue jay (Cyanocitta cristata). The predominant blue color of the back and tail is most similar to the blue jay, but it has the crown, nasal tufts, and black facial mask of the green jay. Unlike both parent species, the chin and upper throat are blue. As such, it exhibits a codominant intermediate plumage phenotype, rather than a blended one. The occurrence of the hybrid is believed to have originated from an increased overlap of the ranges of the two species in the decades preceding its discovery. The most recent common ancestor of the blue and green jays lived at least 7 million years ago ago, making their hybridization surprising.

Two other cases of intergeneric hybridization (hybrids between individuals of different genera) have been documented in the family Corvidae prior to the discovery of the 'grue jay'. These are between California scrub jay (Aphelocoma californica) and Steller's jay (Cyanocitta stelleri), and between blue jay (Cyanocitta cristata) and Florida scrub jay (Aphelocoma coerulescens) (Note: A further 'intergeneric' hybrid cited in 1981 between brown jay (then Psilorhinus morio) and magpie jay (then Calocitta formosa), is no longer considered an intergeneric hybrid, as current taxonomy has moved these two species into the same genus, as Cyanocorax morio and Cyanocorax formosus respectively.). No hybrids involving Cyanocorax luxuosus (green jay) have previously been reported in the wild, although a hybrid between a "green jay" (either Cyanocorax luxuosus or Cyanocorax yncas; not distinguished at that time (Note: The bird involved was of unknown origin, so its identity under current taxonomy is not determinable)) and a blue jay was produced in captivity at the Fort Worth Zoo, reported in 1981. At this time, the researchers noted that the possibility of a natural occurrence of this hybrid in the wild would be unlikely and not expected to occur, as the two species' breeding ranges were then separated by around 200 kilometres (120 mi).
