= Stator subaeneus =

Scientific classification
- Kingdom: Animalia
- Phylum: Arthropoda
- Class: Insecta
- Order: Coleoptera
- Suborder: Polyphaga
- Infraorder: Cucujiformia
- Family: Chrysomelidae
- Genus: Stator
- Species: S. subaeneus

Binomial name
- Stator subaeneus (Schaeffer, 1907)

Species of beetle

Stator subaeneus is a species of leaf beetle in the family Chrysomelidae. It is found in Central America and North America.
