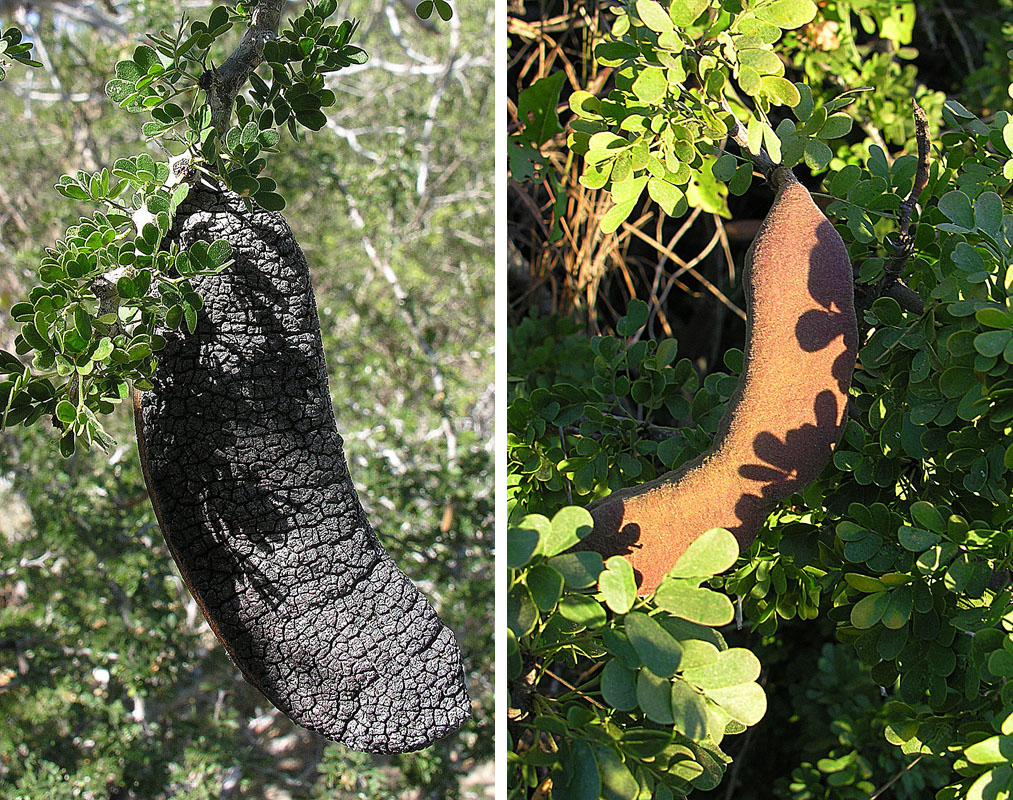
- The fruits, which allegedly resemble dog poop

Scientific classification
- Kingdom: Plantae
- Clade: Tracheophytes
- Clade: Angiosperms
- Clade: Eudicots
- Clade: Rosids
- Order: Fabales
- Family: Fabaceae
- Subfamily: Caesalpinioideae
- Clade: Mimosoid clade
- Genus: Ebenopsis
- Species: E. confinis

Binomial name
- Ebenopsis confinis (Standl.) Barneby & J.W.Grimes, 1996

Synonyms
- Pithecellobium confine Standl. 1919

= Ebenopsis confinis =

Dog poop bush

Leguminous species of plant from Mexico

Ebenopsis confinis is a species of drought deciduous perennial shrubs in the Legume family known commonly as dog poop bush. The English vernacular name is a result of the distinctive woody fruits which resemble dog poop. The plant is referred to locally as palo fierro. In addition to the fruits, this species is characterized by its small, equally-paired pinnate leaves and a condensed capitulum. This species is distributed from southern Baja California to the cape of Baja California Sur, and on the coast of Sonora.

== Description ==
This species is a stiffly branched, drought deciduous multi-stemmed large shrub to small tree with a spreading crown. The bark is a gray-brown to reddish brown, and is initially smooth but becomes scaly. The twigs are moderately stout and have a pair of spines (stipules) 2 to 8 mm long emerging at the node of each leaf. The leaves are small, alternate and bipinnately compound.

The inflorescence emerges from 1 to 3 peduncles per shoot, 3 to 8 mm long. The flower clusters have around 17 to 35 flowers. The bracts are shaped obovate to cuneate or spatulate, 0.6 to 1 mm large, and persist into anthesis. The calyx is shaped campanulate. The flowers are small, colored yellowish white, and appear as fluffy heads in pom-pom like cluster. The flowers are fragrant.

The distinctive fruit is an oblong pod with a woody texture and blackish coloration, with 8 to 10 seeds. The seeds are large, 11 to 16 mm long and 10 to 13 mm wide.

== Taxonomy ==
This species was first collected by Joseph Nelson Rose in 1911, near Cabo San Lucas. It was first described as Pithecellobium confinie by Paul C. Standley in 1919. It was later combined into the genus Ebenopsis by Rupert C. Barneby and James W. Grimes in 1996 as part of their monograph on the Mimosaceae.

This plant is known locally by the common names ejotón, palo fierro or palo hierro in Spanish. In English, this plant is referred to as dog poop bush, owing to the appearance of the woody fruit pods.

== Distribution and habitat ==
This species is near-endemic to the Baja California Peninsula, distributed from southeast Baja California, in the vicinity of Bahia de los Angeles, south to Baja California Sur, where it is locally plentiful, especially on the Gulf of California slope and the adjacent islands. It is also present on a stretch of coast in Sonora. It grows in a habitat of desert hillsides and thin chaparral below 250 m, usually along washes.
