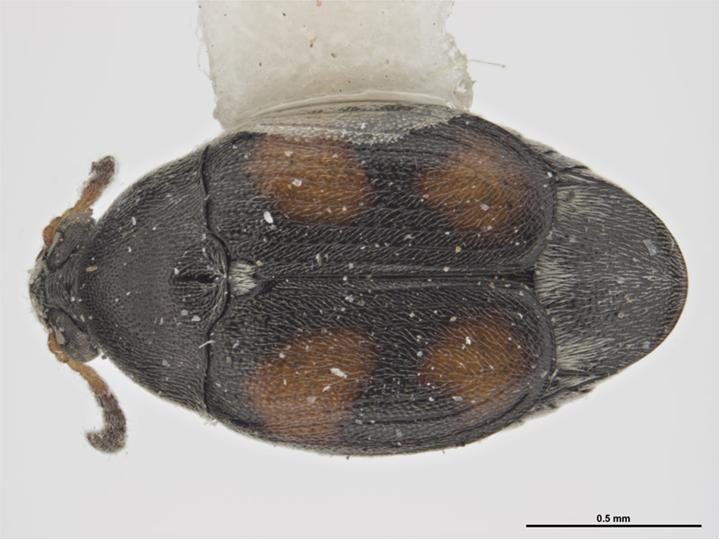
- Stator limbatus

Scientific classification
- Kingdom: Animalia
- Phylum: Arthropoda
- Class: Insecta
- Order: Coleoptera
- Suborder: Polyphaga
- Infraorder: Cucujiformia
- Family: Chrysomelidae
- Subfamily: Bruchinae
- Tribe: Bruchini
- Genus: Stator; Bridwell, 1946

= Stator (beetle) =

Genus of beetles

Stator is a genus of seed beetles in the family Chrysomelidae. There are about 14 described species in Stator. Most members of the genus specialize on legumes.

== Species ==
These 14 species belong to the genus Stator:

- Stator beali Johnson, 1963^{i c g b}
- Stator bixae (Drapiez, 1820)^{g}
- Stator bottimeri Kingsolver, 1972^{i c g}
- Stator chihuahua Johnson & Kingsolver, 1976^{i c g b}
- Stator coconino Johnson and Kingsolver, 1976^{i c g}
- Stator dissimilis
- Stator huautlae Romero-Napoles & Johnson, 2004^{g}
- Stator limbatus (Horn, 1873)^{i c g b}
- Stator monachus (Sharp, 1885)^{g}
- Stator pruininus (Horn, 1873)^{i c g b} (pruinose bean weevil)
- Stator pygidialis (Schaeffer, 1907)^{i c g}
- Stator sordidus (Horn, 1873)^{i c g b}
- Stator subaeneus (Schaeffer, 1907)^{i c g b}
- Stator vachelliae Bottimer, 1973^{i c g b}

Data sources: i = ITIS, c = Catalogue of Life, g = GBIF, b = Bugguide.net
