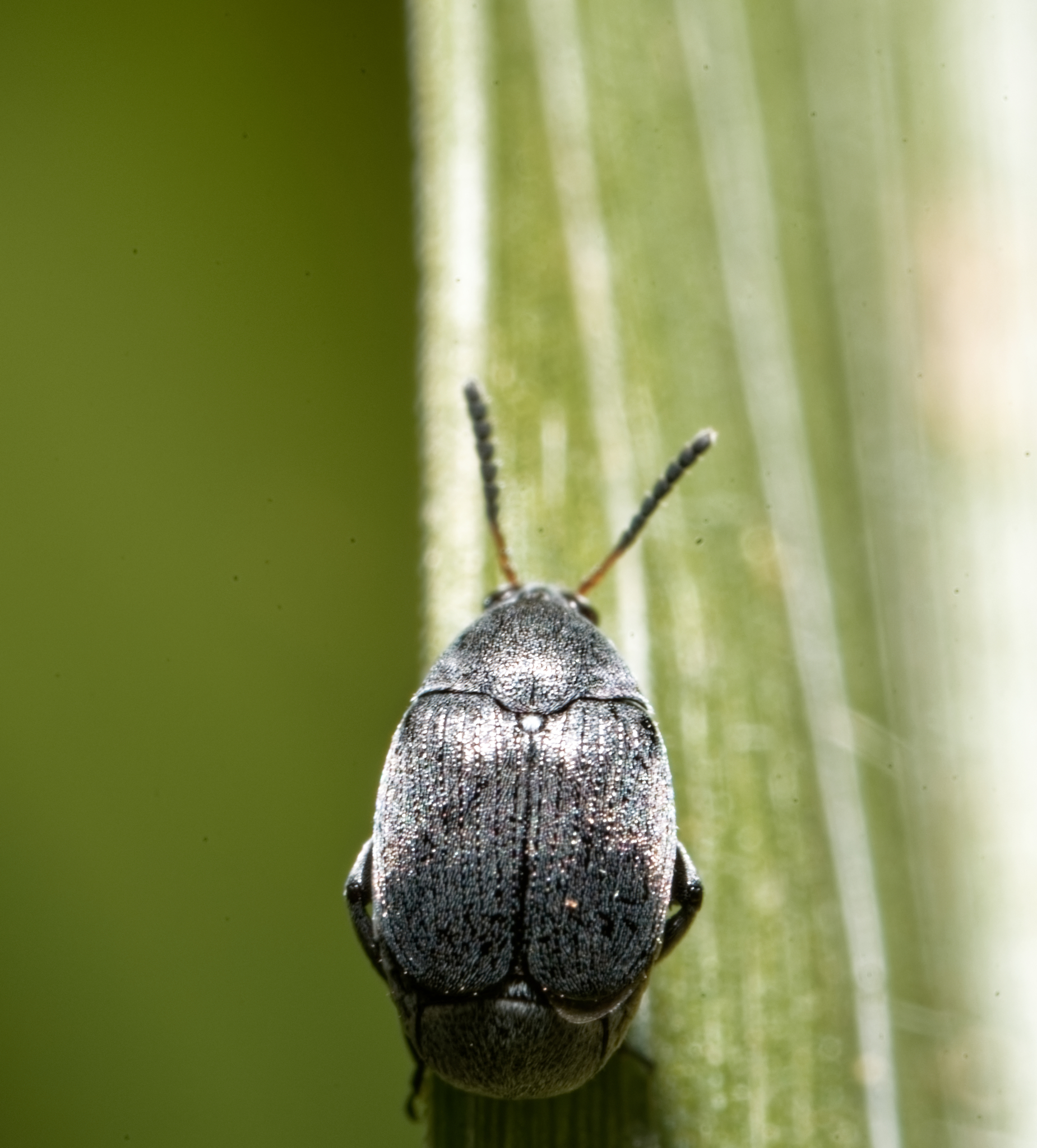
- S. pruininus

Scientific classification
- Kingdom: Animalia
- Phylum: Arthropoda
- Class: Insecta
- Order: Coleoptera
- Suborder: Polyphaga
- Infraorder: Cucujiformia
- Family: Chrysomelidae
- Genus: Stator
- Species: S. pruininus

Binomial name
- Stator pruininus (Horn, 1873)

= Stator pruininus =

Pruinose bean weevil

Species of beetle

Stator pruininus, the pruinose bean weevil, is a species of leaf beetle in the family Chrysomelidae. It is found in Central America, North America, Oceania, and South America.
