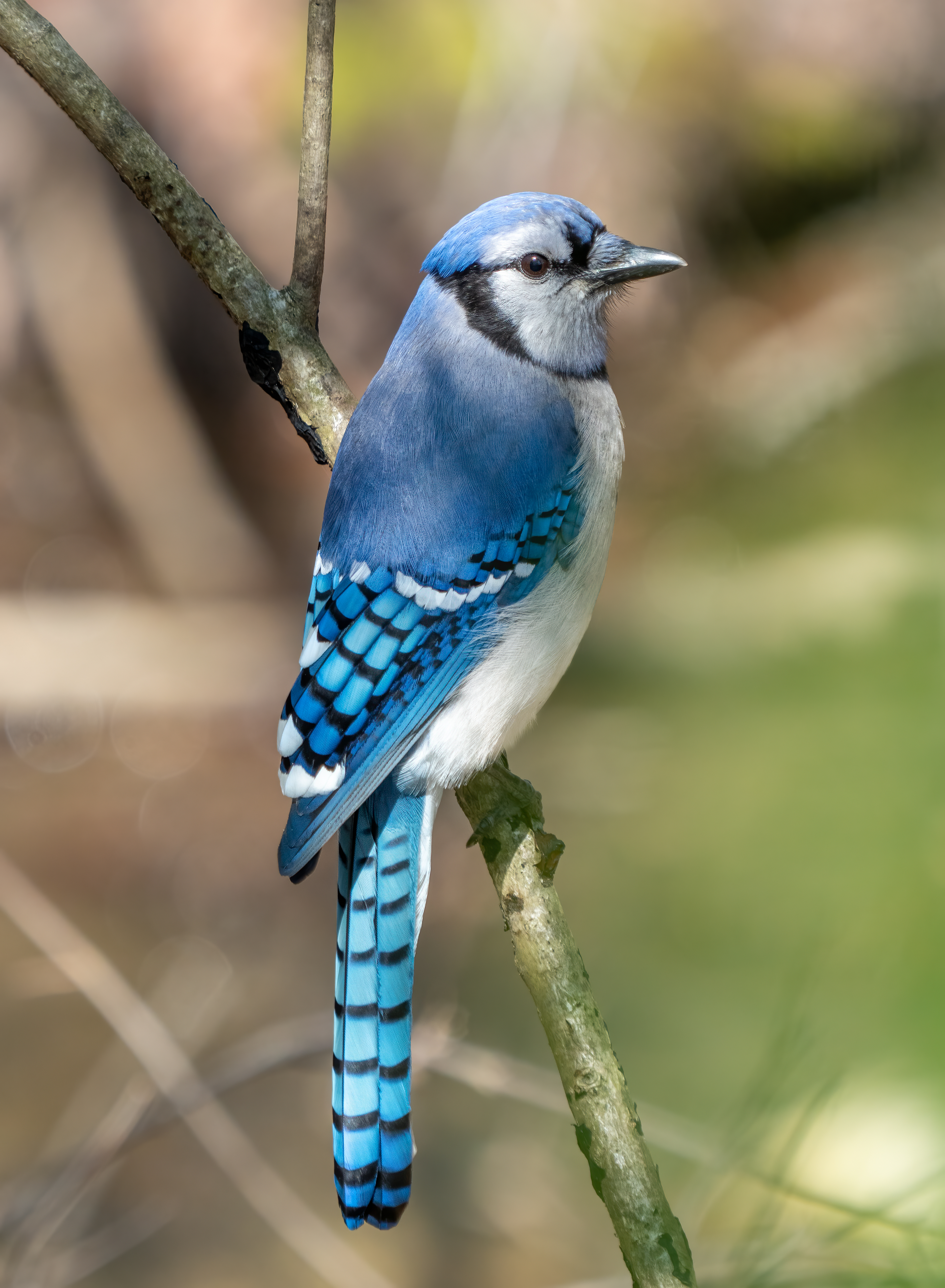
- In Prospect Park, Brooklyn, New York
- Sounds

Conservation status
- Least Concern (IUCN 3.1)

Scientific classification
- Kingdom: Animalia
- Phylum: Chordata
- Class: Aves
- Order: Passeriformes
- Family: Corvidae
- Genus: Cyanocitta
- Species: C. cristata

Binomial name
- Cyanocitta cristata (Linnaeus, 1758)

Subspecies
- 4 sspp., see text
- Approximate distribution map Year-round Nonbreeding

Synonyms
- Corvus cristatus Linnaeus, 1758

= Blue jay =

Blue jay Temporal range: Piacenzian–present

Species of bird

The blue jay (Cyanocitta cristata) is a passerine bird in the family Corvidae, native to eastern North America. It lives in most of the eastern and central United States; some eastern populations may be migratory. Resident populations are also in Newfoundland, Canada; breeding populations are found across southern Canada. It breeds in both deciduous and coniferous forests, and is common in residential areas. Its coloration is predominantly blue, with a white chest and underparts, and a blue crest; it has a black, U-shaped collar around its neck and a black border behind the crest. Males and females are similar in size and plumage, which does not vary throughout the year. Four subspecies have been recognized.

The blue jay feeds mainly on seeds and nuts, such as acorns, which it may hide to eat later; soft fruits; arthropods; and occasionally small vertebrates. It typically gleans food from trees, shrubs, and the ground, and sometimes hawks insects from the air. Blue jays can be very aggressive to other birds; they sometimes raid nests and have even been found to have decapitated other birds.

It builds an open cup nest in the branches of a tree; both sexes participate. The clutch may be two to seven eggs, which are bluish or light brown with darker brown spots. Young are altricial, and are brooded by the female for 8–12 days after hatching. They may stay with their parents for one to two months.

The name jay derives from the bird's noisy, garrulous nature and has been applied to many other birds of the same family, which are also mostly gregarious. Jays are also called jaybirds.

== Taxonomy ==
The blue jay was first described as Pica glandaria cærulea cristata in English naturalist Mark Catesby's 1731 publication of Natural History of Carolina, Florida, and the Bahamas. It was later described as Corvus cristatus in Carl Linnaeus' 1758 edition of Systema Naturae. In the 19th century, the jay was described by French ornithologist Charles Lucien Bonaparte in 1838 as Cyanocorax cristatus in A geographical and comparative list of the birds of Europe and North America, and given its modern scientific name Cyanocitta cristata by Hugh Edwin Strickland in 1845. The genus name Cyanocitta derives from the Greek words kyaneos (blue) and the kitta and kissa (chattering bird, jay), and the term "blue chatterer" refers to the bright blue plumage of the head, nape, back, and tail of the bird. The specific name cristata (crested, tufted) derives from Latin referring to the prominent blue crest of the jay.

== Description ==
John James Audubon drawing circa 1830s

The blue jay measures 22–30 cm (9–12 in) from bill to tail and weighs 70–100 g (2.5–3.5 oz), with a wingspan of 34–43 cm (13–17 in). Consistent with Bergmann's rule, jays from Connecticut averaged 92.4 g (3.26 oz) in weight, while jays from warmer southern Florida averaged 73.7 g (2.60 oz). There is a pronounced crest on the head, a crown of feathers, which may be raised or lowered according to the bird's mood. When excited or aggressive, the crest will be fully raised. When frightened, the crest bristles outwards, brushlike. When the bird is feeding among other jays or resting, the crest is flattened on the head.

Its plumage is lavender-blue to mid-blue in the crest, back, wings, and tail, and its face is white. The underside is off-white and the neck is collared with black which extends to the sides of the head. The wing primaries and tail are strongly barred with black, sky-blue, and white. The bill, legs, and eyes are all black. Males and females are almost identical, but the male is slightly larger. The black plumage on its nape, face, and throat varies extensively between individuals; it is believed to assist in recognition between individuals.

As with most other blue-hued birds, the blue jay's coloration is not derived from pigments but is the result of light interference due to the internal structure of the feathers; if a blue feather is crushed, the blue disappears because the structure is destroyed. The actual pigment in its feathers is melanin. This is referred to as structural coloration.

== Distribution and habitat ==
The blue jay occurs from southern Canada and throughout the eastern and central United States south to Florida and northeastern Texas. The western edge of the range stops where the arid pine forest and scrub habitat of the closely related Steller's jay (C. stelleri) begins, generally in the eastern foothills of the Rocky Mountains. Recently, the range of the blue jay has extended northwestwards so that it is now a rare but regularly seen winter visitor along the northern US and southern Canadian Pacific Coast. As the two species' ranges now overlap, C. cristata may sometimes hybridize with Steller's jays. In 2023, a hybrid between a male blue jay and a female green jay (Cyanocorax luxuosus) - given the portmanteau name of grue jay - was found and photographed in the vicinity of San Antonio, Texas, being confirmed to be a hybrid in 2025. As with the overlapping ranges of blue and Steller's jays, the ranges of the blue and green jays have also overlapped, allowing birds to interbreed and produce hybrid offspring.

The increase in trees throughout the Great Plains during the past century due to fire suppression and tree planting facilitated the western range expansion of the blue jay as well as range expansions of many other species of birds. From 1966 to 2015, the Blue Jay experienced a population decline along the Atlantic coast, but a greater than 1.5% annual population increase throughout the northern part of its range, including Labrador, Nova Scotia, southern Quebec, and southern Manitoba.

The northernmost subspecies C. c. bromia is, subject to necessity, migratory. It may withdraw several hundred kilometers south in the northernmost parts of its range. Thousands of blue jays have been observed to migrate in flocks along the Great Lakes and Atlantic coasts. It migrates during the daytime, in loose flocks of 5 to 250 birds. Much about their migratory behavior remains a mystery. Some are present throughout winter in all parts of their range. Young jays may be more likely to migrate than adults, but many adults also migrate. Some individual jays migrate south one year, stay north the next winter, and then migrate south again the next year. To date, no one has concretely worked out why they migrate when they do. Likely, it is related to weather conditions and how abundant the winter food sources are, which can determine whether other northern birds will move south.

The blue jay occupies a variety of habitats within its large range, from the pine woods of Florida to the spruce-fir forests of northern Ontario. It is less abundant in denser forests, preferring mixed woodlands with oaks and beeches. It has adapted to human activity very well, occurring in parks and residential areas, and can adapt to wholesale deforestation with relative ease if human activity creates other means for the jays to get by.

== Subspecies ==
Four subspecies are generally accepted, though the variation within this species is rather subtle and essentially clinal. No firm boundaries can be drawn between the inland subspecies. The ranges of the coastal races are better delimited.

Image	Subspecies	Common name	Description	Distribution
	Cyanocitta cristata bromia Oberholser, HC 1921	Northern blue jay	The largest subspecies, with fairly dull plumage. Blue is rather pale.	Canada and northern United States. Type locality: Wooster, Wayne County, Ohio.
	Cyanocitta cristata cristata	Coastal blue jay	The nominate subspecies, mid-sized and vivid blue.	Coastal USA from North Carolina to Texas, except southern Florida. Type locality: southeastern South Carolina.
	Cyanocitta cristata cyanotephra Sutton, GM 1935	Interior blue jay	Mid-sized, quite dark blue on mantle contrasting cleanly with very white underside, broader white wingbar and tail tip.	Inland USA from SE Wyoming and Nebraska to west Kansas, Oklahoma and northern Texas, intergrading with C. c. bromia to the north. Type locality: Kenton, Cimarron County, Oklahoma.
	Cyanocitta cristata semplei Todd, 1928	Florida blue jay	The smallest subspecies, much like C. c. bromia in color.	Southern Florida. Type locality: Coconut Grove, Miami-Dade County, Florida.

== Behavior ==
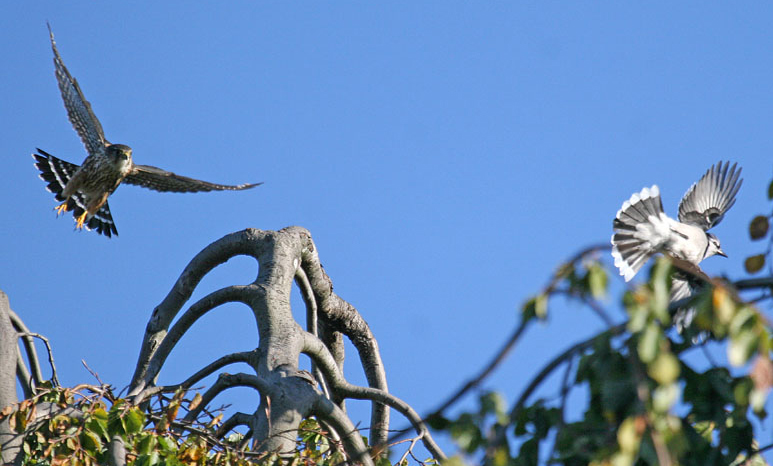
Merlin chasing a blue jay

The blue jay is a noisy, bold, and aggressive passerine. It is a moderately slow flier (roughly 32–40 km/h or 20–25 mph) when unprovoked. It flies with body and tail held level, with slow wing beats. Its slow flying speeds make this species easy prey for hawks and owls when it flies in open areas. Virtually all the raptorial birds sympatric in distribution with the blue jay may prey upon it, especially swift bird-hunting specialists such as the Accipiter hawks. Diverse predators may prey on jay eggs and young up to their fledgling stage, including tree squirrels, snakes, cats, crows, raccoons, opossums, other jays and possibly many of the same birds of prey who attack adults.

The blue jay can be beneficial to other bird species, as it may chase predatory birds, such as hawks and owls, and will scream if it sees a predator within its territory. It has also been known to sound an alarm call when hawks or other dangers are near, and smaller birds often recognize this call and hide themselves away accordingly. It may occasionally impersonate the calls of raptors, especially those of the red-tailed and red-shouldered hawks, possibly to test whether a hawk is in the vicinity, though also possibly to scare off other birds that may compete for food sources. It may also be aggressive towards humans who come close to its nest, and if an owl roosts near the nest during the daytime the blue jay mobs it until it takes a new roost. However, blue jays have also been known to attack or kill other smaller birds, and foliage-roosting bat species such as Eastern red bats. Jays are very territorial birds, and they will chase others from a feeder for an easier meal. Additionally, the blue jay may raid other birds' nests, stealing eggs, chicks, and nests. However, this may not be as common as is typically thought, as only 1% of food matter in one study was bird material. Despite this, other passerines may still mob jays who come within their breeding territories.

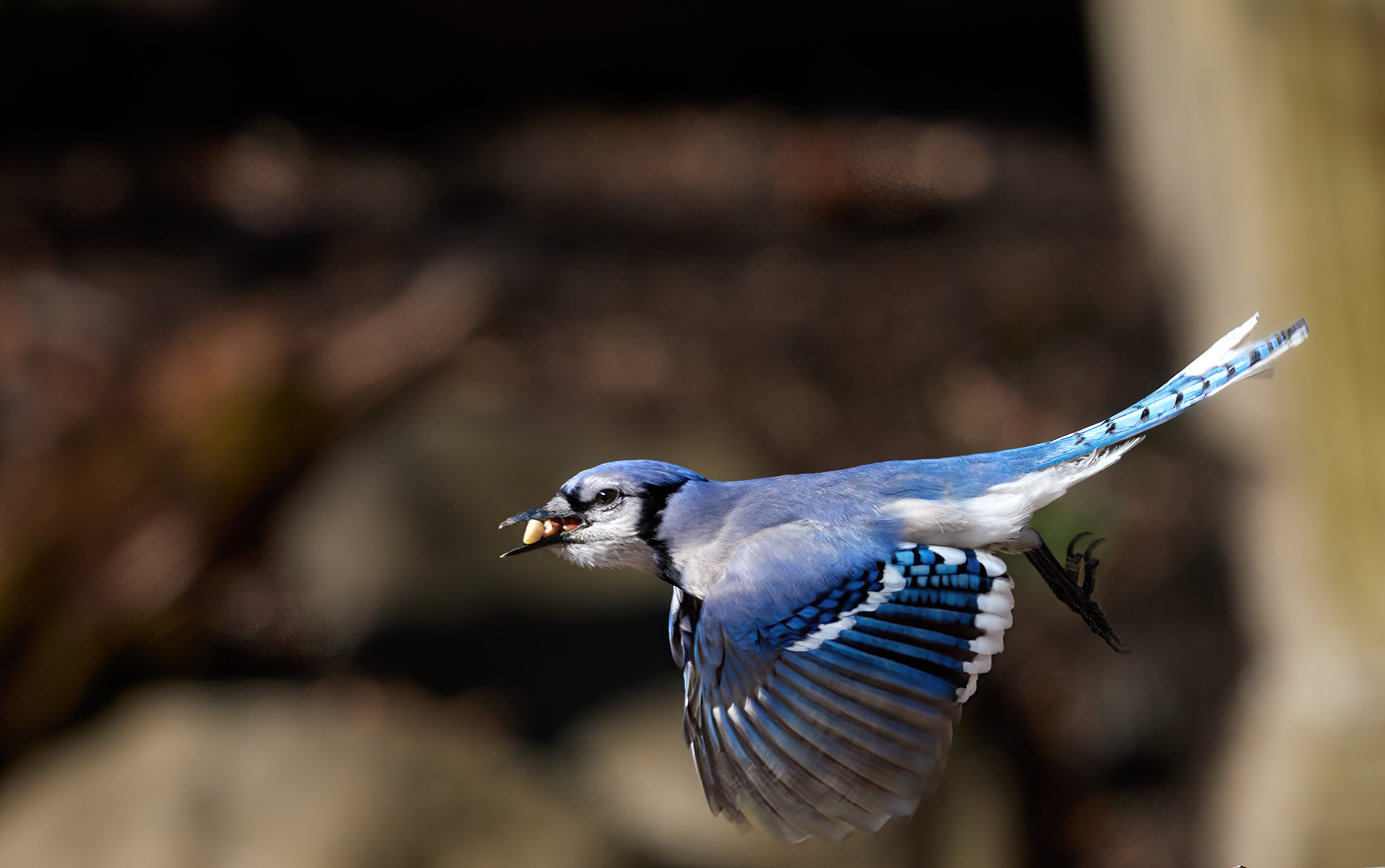
Blue jay in flight

When a blue jay is agitated or angry, the blue crest atop its head will rise. It will lower when the bird is relaxed or calm.

Blue jays, like other corvids, are highly curious and are considered intelligent birds. Young individuals playfully snatch brightly colored or reflective objects, such as bottle caps or pieces of aluminum foil, and carry them around until they lose interest. Blue jays are confirmed to have engaged in tool use both in captivity and in the wild. Blue jays in captivity have been observed using strips of newspaper as tools to obtain food, while captive fledglings have been observed attempting to open the doors of their cages. A wild blue jay was observed using a piece of bark to aid in catching a spider.

== Diet ==
Cracking seeds

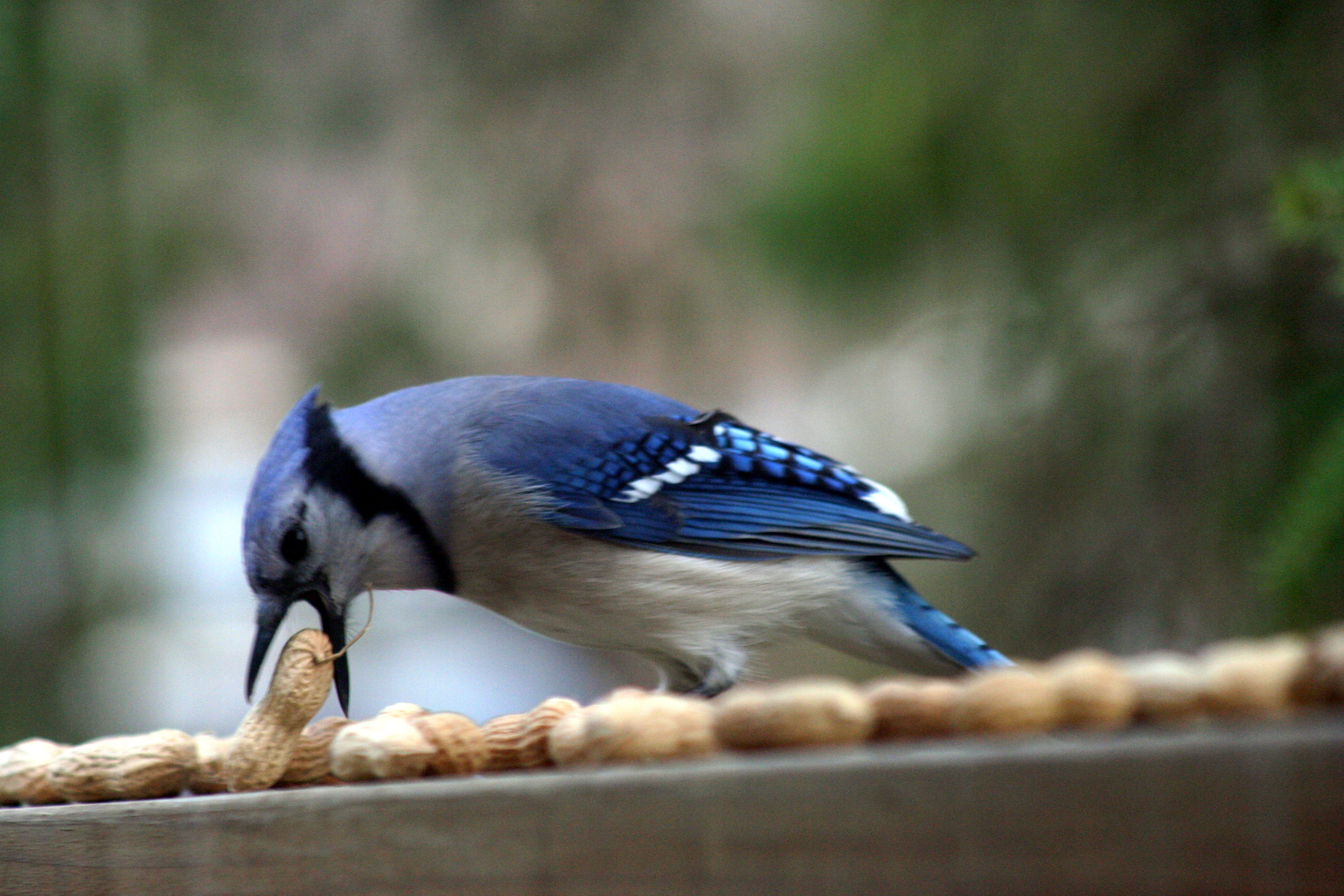
Eating peanuts

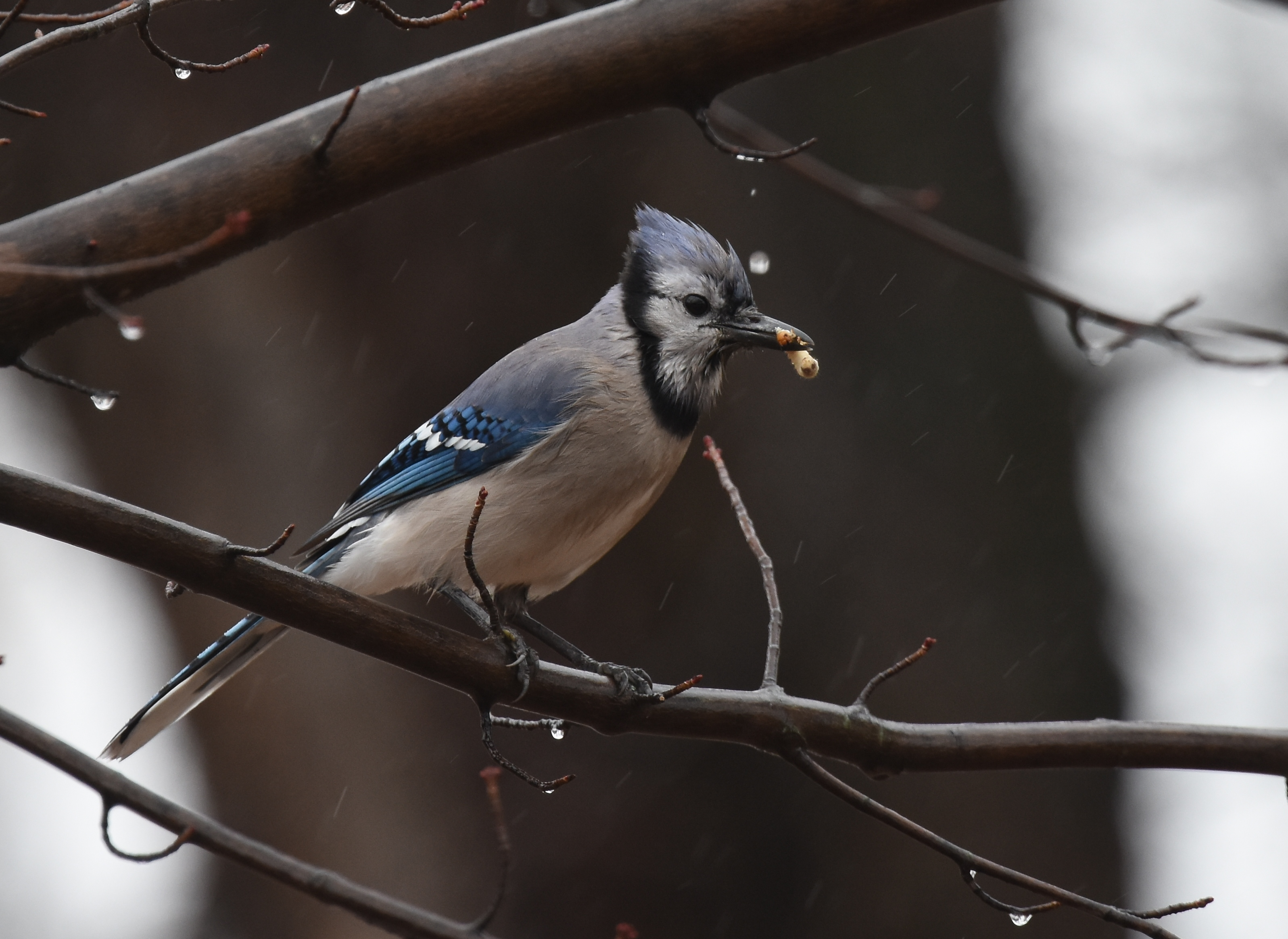
Eating an insect larva

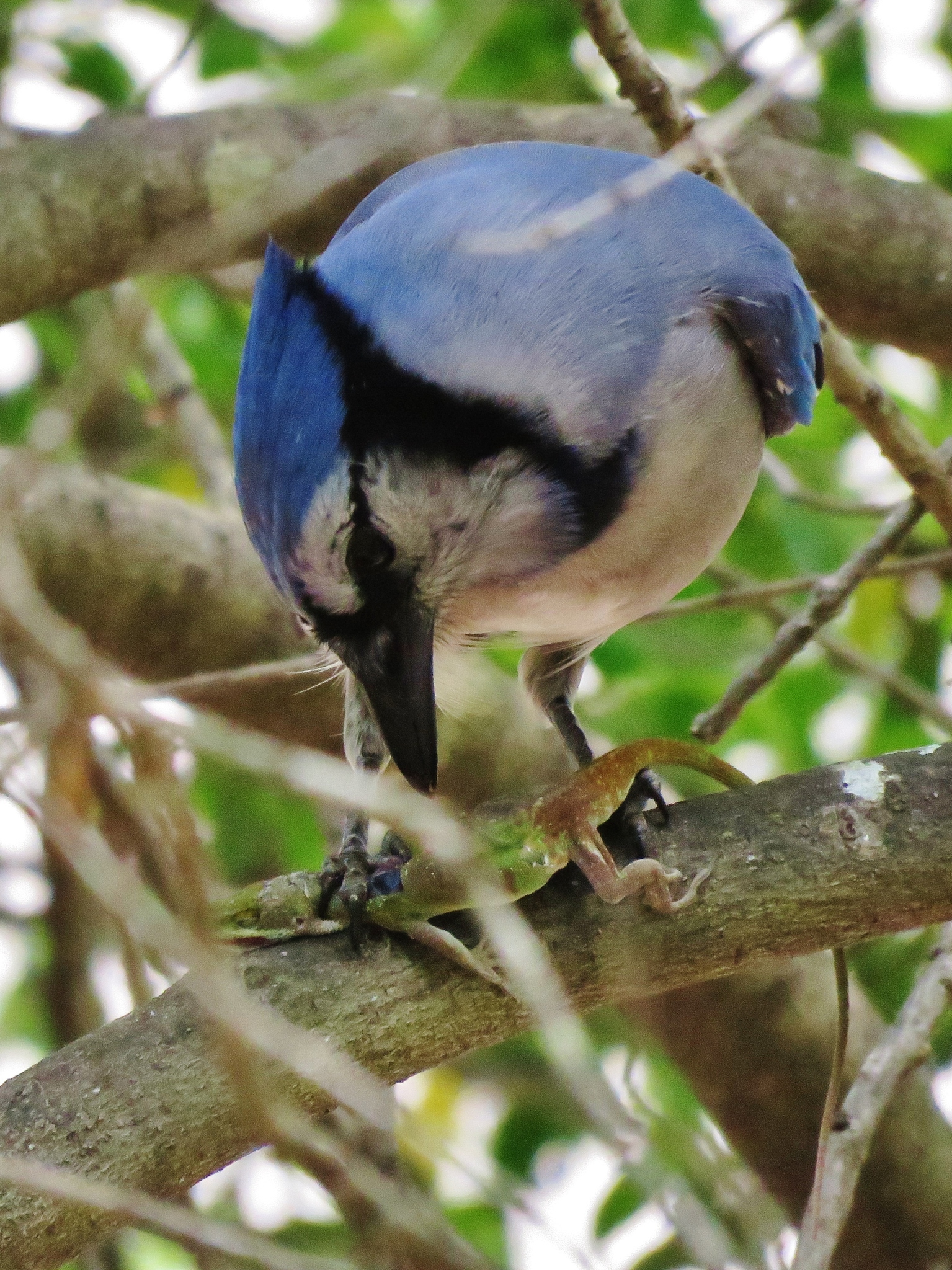
Eating a green anole

Blue jays are omnivorous, but the Audubon Society estimates that 75% of their diet is vegetable matter. They have strong black bills which they use for cracking nuts, usually while holding them with their feet, and for eating corn, grains and seeds. Blue jays particularly love to eat peanuts in the shell. Its food is sought both on the ground and in trees and includes virtually all known types of plant and animal sources, such as acorns and beech mast, weed seeds, grain, fruit, and other berries, peanuts, bread, meat, small invertebrates of many types, scraps in town parks, bird-table food and rarely eggs and nestlings. Blue jays will sometimes cache food, though to what extent differs widely among individuals. Although seemingly contentious in their general behavior, blue jays are frequently subservient to other medium-sized birds who visit bird feeders. In Florida, blue jays were dominated at feeders by eastern gray squirrels, Florida scrub jays, common grackles, and red-headed woodpeckers, all of which were occasionally observed to aggressively prevent the jays from feeding.

== Reproduction ==
The mating season begins in mid-March, peaks in mid-April to May, and extends into July. Any suitable tree or large bush may be used for nesting, though an evergreen is preferred. The nest is preferentially built at a height in the trees of 3 to 10 m (10 to 33 ft). It is cup-shaped and composed of twigs, small roots, bark strips, moss, other plant material, cloth, paper, and feathers, with occasional mud added to the cup.

Blue jays are not very picky about nesting locations. If no better place is available – such as in a heavily deforested area – they will even use places like the large mailboxes typical of the rural United States. They also appropriate nests of other mid-sized songbirds as long as these are placed in suitable spots; American robin nests are commonly used by blue jays, for example.

Blue jays typically form monogamous pair bonds for life. Both sexes build the nest and rear the young, though only the female broods them. The male feeds the female while she is brooding the eggs. There are usually between 3 and 6 (averaging 4 or 5) eggs laid and incubated over 16–18 days. The young fledge usually between 17 and 21 days after hatching.

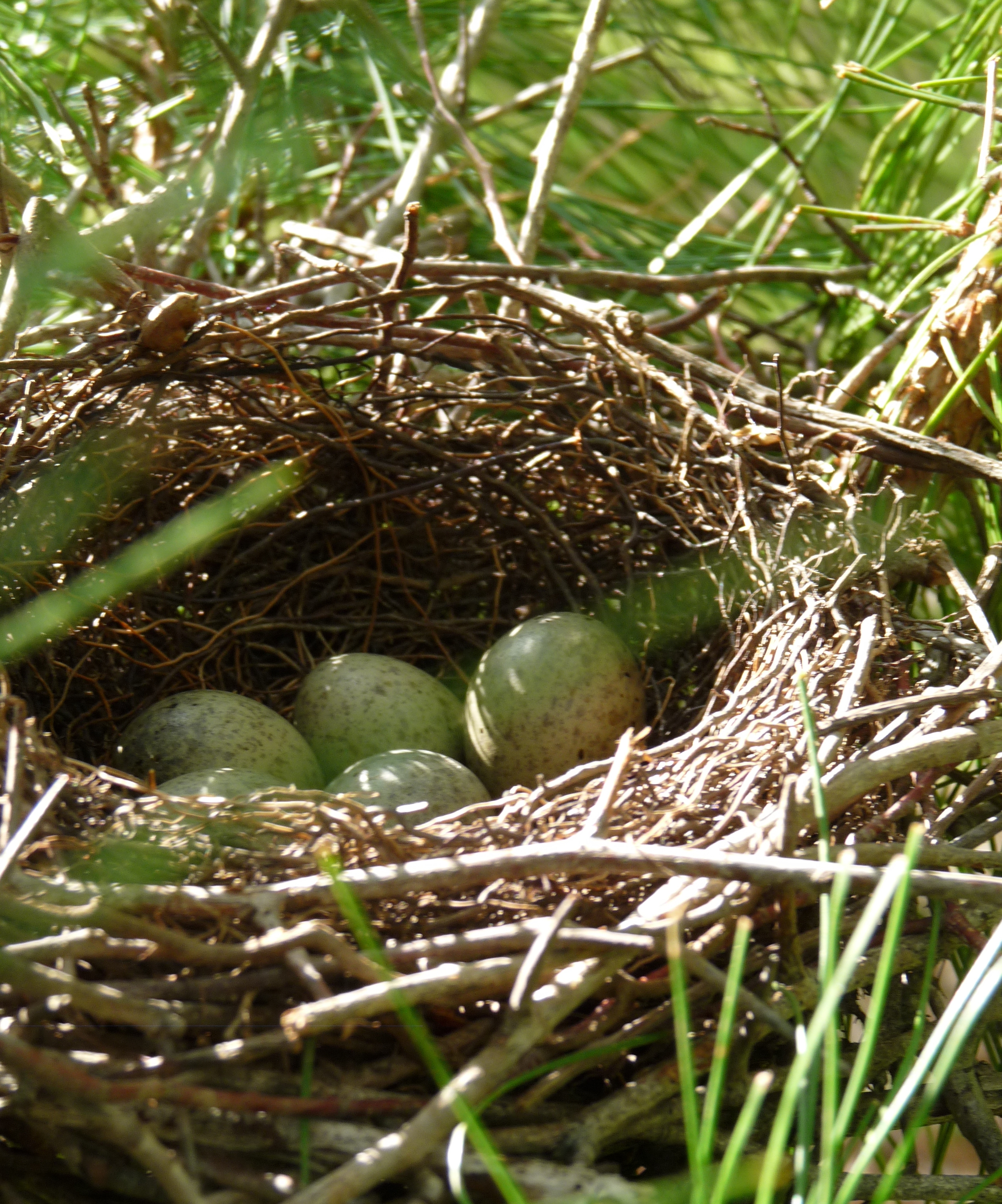
Nest in the top of a little pine

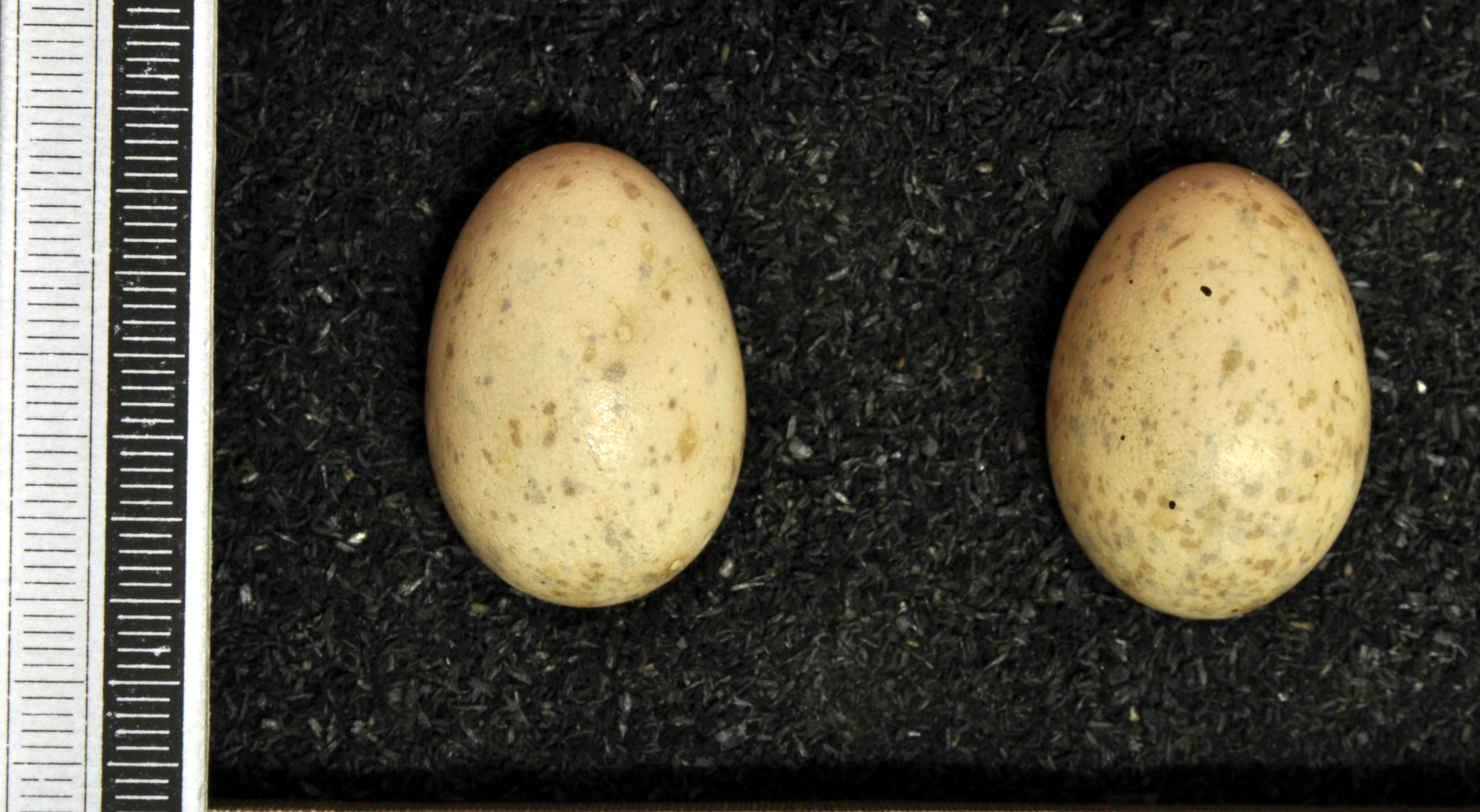
Eggs, Collection Museum Wiesbaden

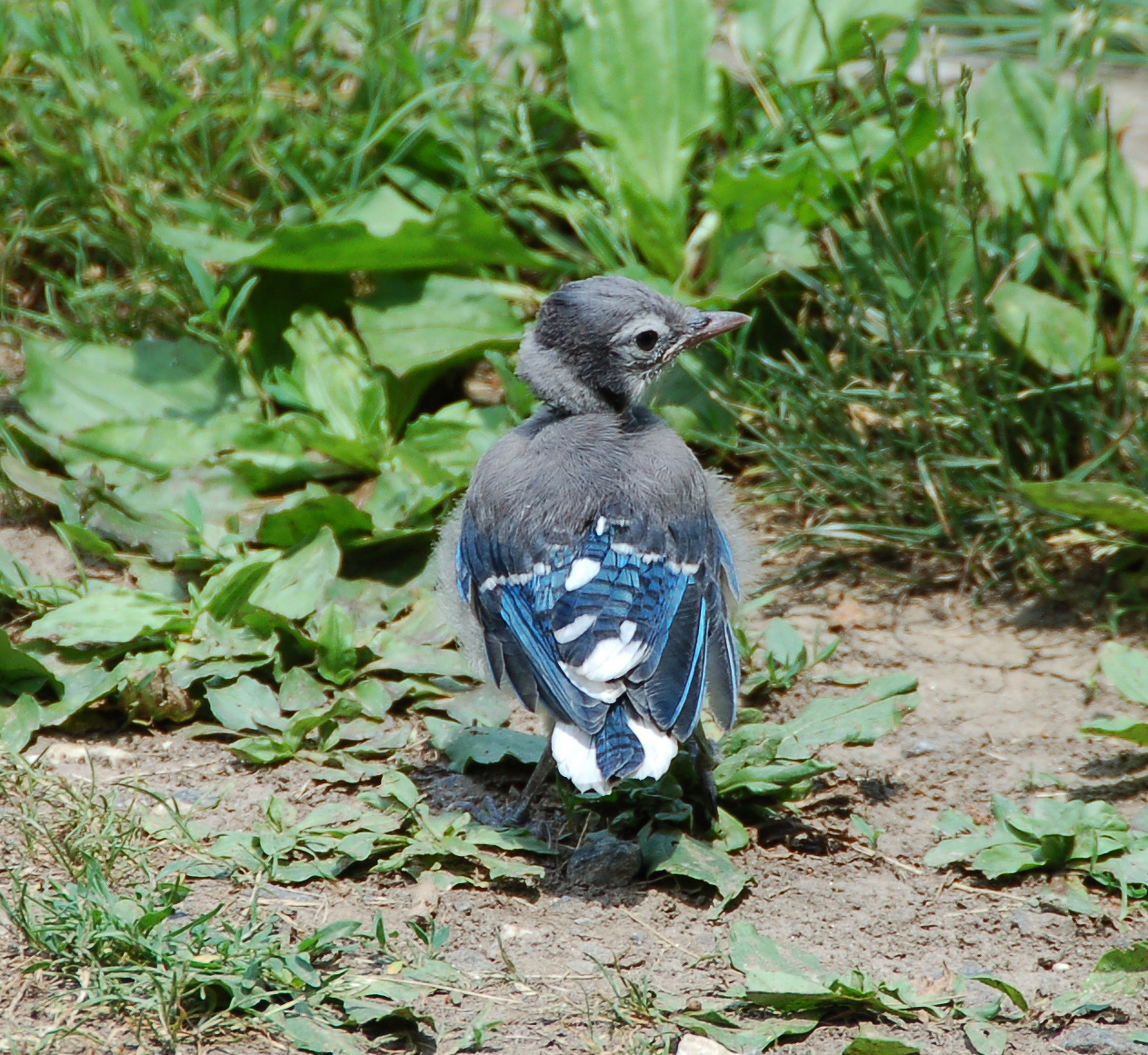
Fledgling, in mid-June

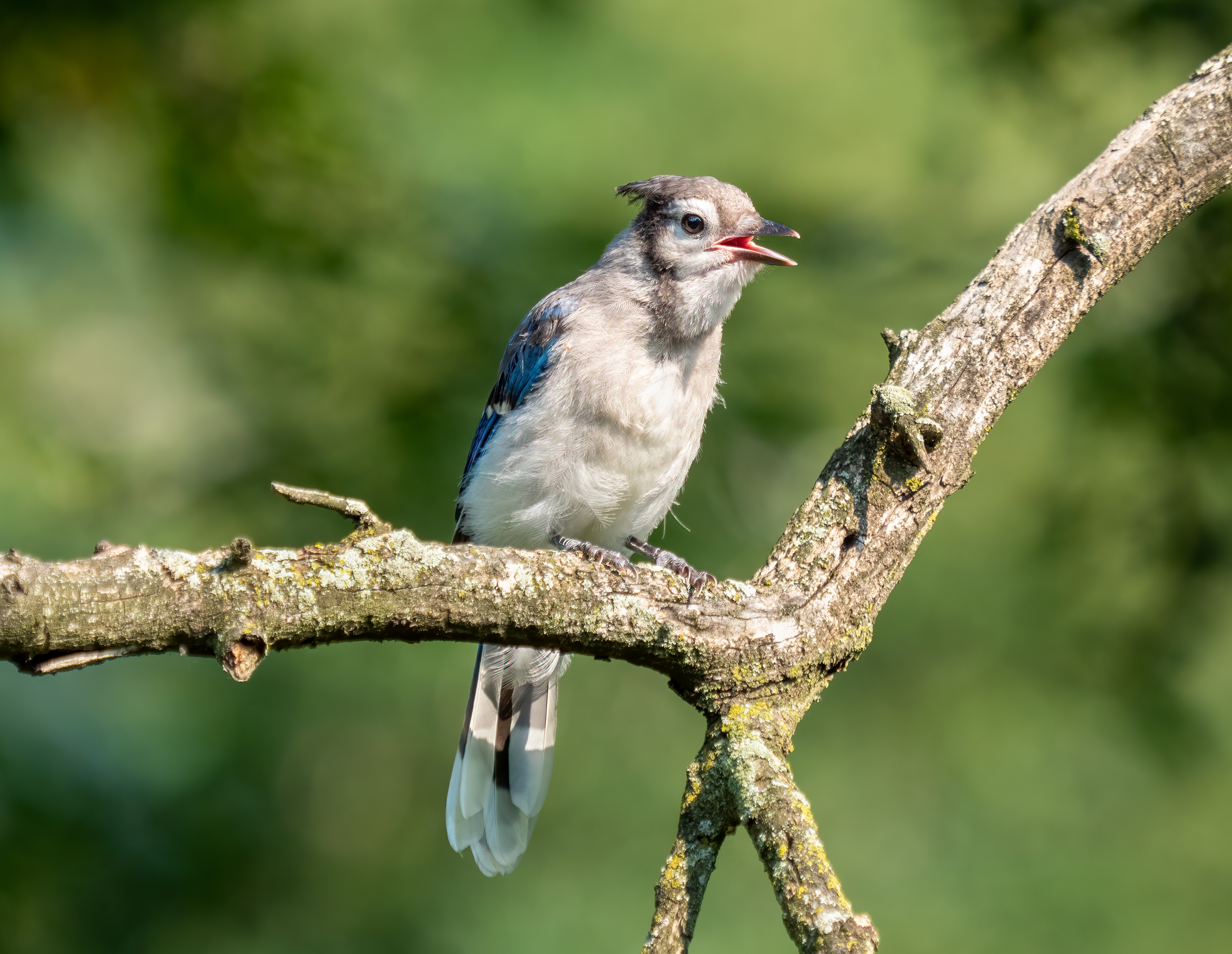
Juvenile, in July

After the juveniles fledge, the family travels and forages together until early fall, when the young birds disperse to avoid competition for food during the winter. Sexual maturity is reached after one year of age. The oldest known wild, banded blue jay was at least 26 years, 11 months old when it was found dead after being caught in fishing gear. It had been banded in the Newfoundland/Labrador/Saint-Pierre et Miquelon area in 1989 and was found there in 2016. Another wild jay was found to have been around 17 1/2 years old. A more common lifespan for wild birds that survive to adulthood is around 7 years. Beyond predation and the occasional collision with man-made objects, a common cause of mortality in recent decades has been the West Nile virus, to which corvids as a whole seem especially susceptible. However, despite several major local declines, overall blue jays have not seemed to have been depleted by the disease.

== Vocalizations ==
Blue jays can make a large variety of sounds, and individuals may vary perceptibly in their calling style. Like other corvids, they may learn to mimic human speech. Blue jays can also copy the cries of local hawks so well that it is sometimes difficult to tell which it is. Their voice is typical of most jays in being varied, but the most commonly recognized sound is the alarm call, which is a loud, almost gull-like scream. There is also a high-pitched jayer-jayer call that increases in speed as the bird becomes more agitated. This particular call can be easily confused with the chickadee's song because of the slow-starting chick-ah-dee-ee. Blue jays will use these calls to band together to mob potential predators such as hawks and drive them away from the jays' nests.

Blue jay "rusty pump" calls (among gray catbird calls)

Blue jays also have quiet, less noticeable calls which they use among themselves in proximity. One of the most distinctive calls of this type is often referred to as the "rusty pump" owing to its squeaky resemblance to the sound of an old hand-operated water pump. The blue jay (and other corvids) are distinct from most other songbirds for using their call as a song.

== In human culture ==
=== Fiction and folklore ===
In old African-American folktales of the southern United States, the blue jay was a significant metaphysical creature. In some tales, the blue jay was credited with making the earth "when all de worl' was water" by bringing the first "grit" or "dirt". In other tales the blue jay was temporarily conscripted as a servant of the Devil, and would not be seen on Friday as it was gathering twigs to furnish hell's kindling and give fire to wicked men on Earth. Relieved from duty on Saturday, its song for the day was abundant and joyous.

An anthropomorphic blue jay named Mordecai is one of the main characters of the Cartoon Network animated television series Regular Show.

=== Mascots and symbols ===
The blue jay is the provincial bird of the province of Prince Edward Island in Canada.

The blue jay is also the official mascot for Johns Hopkins University, Elmhurst University, and Creighton University.

The blue jay was adopted as the team symbol of the Toronto Blue Jays Major League Baseball team, as well as some of their minor league affiliates. Their mascot, Ace, is an anthropomorphic blue jay.
