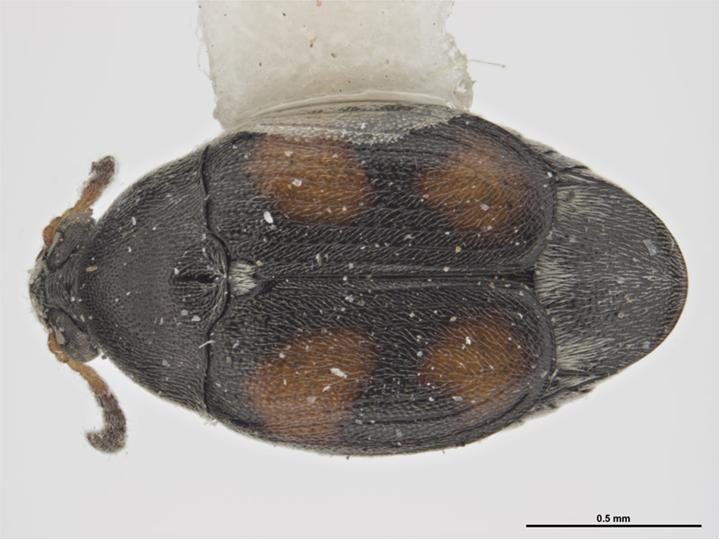

Scientific classification
- Kingdom: Animalia
- Phylum: Arthropoda
- Class: Insecta
- Order: Coleoptera
- Suborder: Polyphaga
- Infraorder: Cucujiformia
- Family: Chrysomelidae
- Genus: Stator
- Species: S. limbatus

Binomial name
- Stator limbatus (Horn, 1873)

Synonyms
- Bruchus limbatus Horn, 1873

= Stator limbatus =

Species of beetle

Stator limbatus is a species of leaf beetle in the family Chrysomelidae. It is native to the southwestern United States, Mexico, and northern South America, where it lives in xeric, semi-arid, and dry tropical environments. It has since spread far beyond its range, including Hawaii, South Africa, the Middle East, and as of 2021, Sardinia and Corsica. S. limbatus feeds on a wide variety of legumes.
