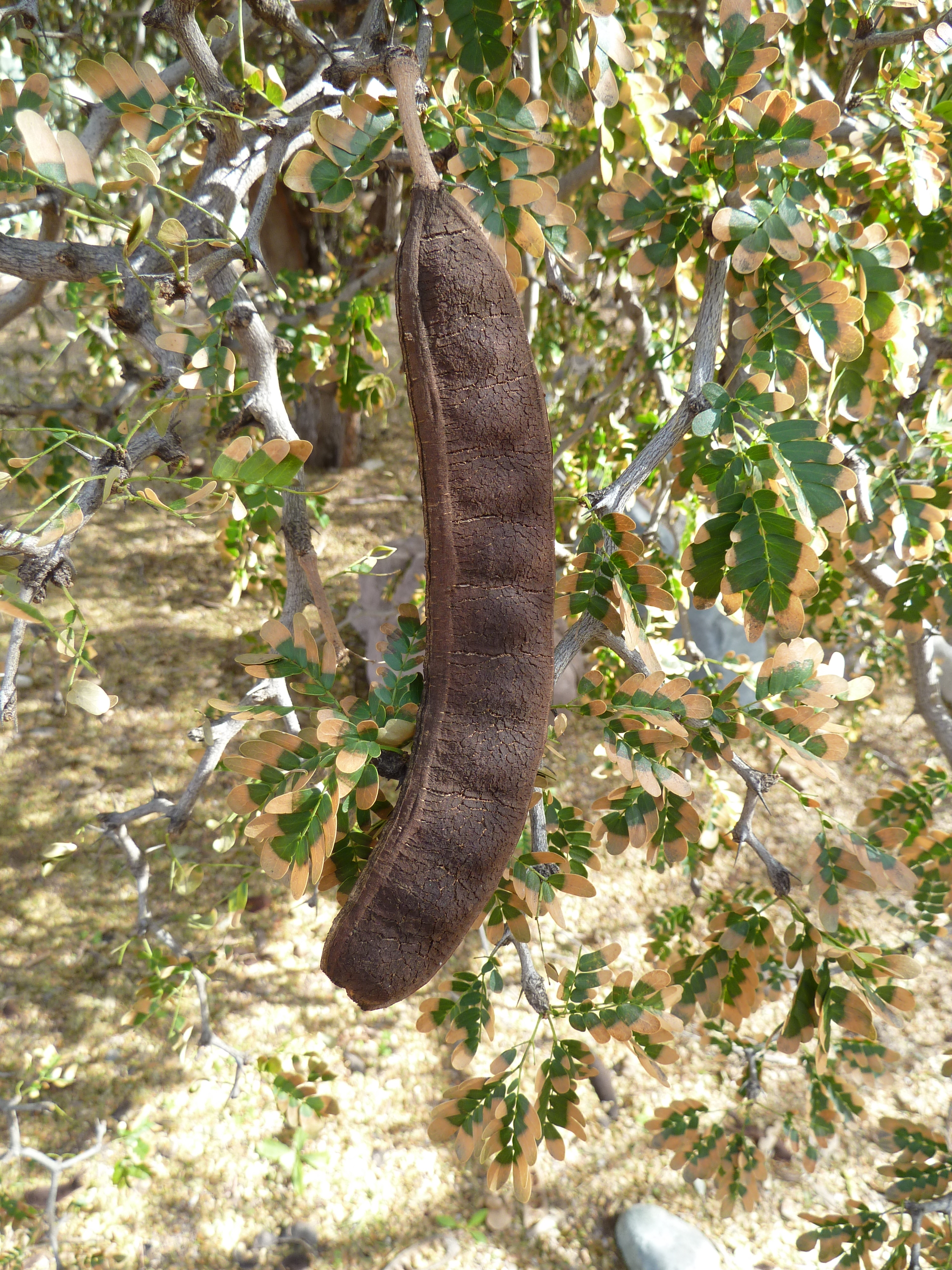
- Ebenopsis ebano

Scientific classification
- Kingdom: Plantae
- Clade: Tracheophytes
- Clade: Angiosperms
- Clade: Eudicots
- Clade: Rosids
- Order: Fabales
- Family: Fabaceae
- Subfamily: Caesalpinioideae
- Clade: Mimosoid clade
- Genus: Ebenopsis; Britton & Rose

Species
- Ebenopsis caesalpinioides (Standl.) Britton & Rose; Ebenopsis confinis (Standl.) Britton & Rose; Ebenopsis ebano (Berland.) Barneby & J.W.Grimes

Synonyms
- Hoopesia Buckley (1861 publ. 1862); Siderocarpos Small (1901), nom. illeg.

= Ebenopsis =

Genus of legumes

Ebenopsis is a genus of flowering plants in the family Fabaceae. It includes three species native to Mexico and Texas.

The name is derived from the Greek words ἔβενος (ébenos), meaning ebony, and ὄψις (opsis), meaning "view".

== Species ==
- Ebenopsis caesalpinioides (Standl.) Britton & Rose
- Ebenopsis confinis (Standl.) Britton & Rose
- Ebenopsis ebano (Berland.) Barneby & J.W.Grimes - Texas ebony (Southern Texas in the United States, eastern Mexico)
