= Stator beali =

Scientific classification
- Kingdom: Animalia
- Phylum: Arthropoda
- Class: Insecta
- Order: Coleoptera
- Suborder: Polyphaga
- Infraorder: Cucujiformia
- Family: Chrysomelidae
- Genus: Stator
- Species: S. beali

Binomial name
- Stator beali Johnson, 1963

Species of beetle

Stator beali is a species of leaf beetle in the family Chrysomelidae. It is found in Central America and North America.
